= 2010–11 West Ham United F.C. season =

English football team season

West Ham United
2010–11 season
- Co-chairmen: David Gold; David Sullivan
- Manager: Avram Grant (until 15 May); Kevin Keen (caretaker, from 15 May to end of season)
- Ground: Boleyn Ground (Upton Park)
- Premier League: 20th (relegated)
- FA Cup: Sixth round
- League Cup: Semi-finals
- Top goalscorer: League: Demba Ba (7); All: Carlton Cole (11)
- Highest home attendance: 34,941 (vs. Liverpool, 27 February 2011)
- Lowest home attendance: 20,902 (vs. Oxford United, 24 August 2010)
Home colours	Away colours

The 2010–11 season was West Ham United's sixth consecutive season in the Premier League. After finishing in 17th place in the previous season, the team finished 20th and was relegated to the Football League Championship.

== Season summary ==
The club appointed Avram Grant as their new manager on 3 June 2010, following the sacking of Gianfranco Zola at the end of a disappointing 2009–10 season. On 15 May 2011, West Ham were relegated to the Championship after a comeback from Wigan Athletic at the DW Stadium. With West Ham leading 2–0 at half-time by two Demba Ba goals, Wigan battled back to win 3–2 thanks to an added-time strike from Charles N'Zogbia. Following the loss, West Ham announced the sacking of manager Avram Grant just one season into his tenure.

== Final League Table ==
Pos	Team	Pld	W	D	L	GF	GA	GD	Pts	Qualification or relegation
16	Wigan Athletic	38	9	15	14	40	61	−21	42	
17	Wolverhampton Wanderers	38	11	7	20	46	66	−20	40	
18	Birmingham City (R)	38	8	15	15	37	58	−21	39	Qualification for the Europa League play-off round and relegation to Football League Championship (Note: Birmingham City qualified for the play-off round of the Europa League after winning the League Cup, worth a third qualification round spot, and subsequently being moved up a round due to the outcome of the FA Cup final.)
19	Blackpool (R)	38	10	9	19	55	78	−23	39	Relegation to Football League Championship
20	West Ham United (R)	38	7	12	19	43	70	−27	33	Relegation to Football League Championship

Source: Barclays Premier League
Rules for classification: 1) points; 2) goal difference; 3) number of goals scored.
(R) Relegated

== Squad ==
Note: Flags indicate national team as defined under FIFA eligibility rules; some limited exceptions apply. Players may hold more than one non-FIFA nationality.

No.	Pos.	Nation	Player
1	GK	ENG	Robert Green
2	DF	NZL	Winston Reid
4	DF	WAL	Danny Gabbidon
5	DF	ENG	James Tomkins
7	MF	ENG	Kieron Dyer
8	MF	ENG	Scott Parker (vice-captain)
9	FW	ENG	Carlton Cole
10	MF	WAL	Jack Collison
11	MF	GER	Thomas Hitzlsperger
12	MF	MEX	Pablo Barrera
13	MF	POR	Luís Boa Morte
14	MF	CZE	Radoslav Kováč
15	DF	ENG	Matthew Upson (captain)
16	MF	ENG	Mark Noble
18	MF	USA	Jonathan Spector
19	FW	ENG	Freddie Sears
20	DF	FRA	Julien Faubert
21	FW	SEN	Demba Ba

No.	Pos.	Nation	Player
22	DF	POR	Manuel da Costa
23	DF	COD	Hérita Ilunga
25	MF	ENG	Junior Stanislas
26	FW	ENG	Zavon Hines
28	GK	HUN	Péter Kurucz
29	GK	CZE	Marek Štěch
30	FW	FRA	Frédéric Piquionne
31	GK	BEL	Ruud Boffin
32	MF	ENG	Gary O'Neil
33	FW	NGR	Victor Obinna (on loan from Internazionale)
34	FW	IRL	Robbie Keane (on loan from Tottenham Hotspur)
36	DF	ENG	Wayne Bridge (on loan from Manchester City)
37	DF	DEN	Lars Jacobsen
40	MF	ENG	Anthony Edgar
42	FW	COL	Cristian Montano
44	DF	ENG	Jordan Brown
46	GK	ENG	Jake Larkins

=== Out on loan ===
No.	Pos.	Nation	Player
—	DF	ENG	Matt Fry (at Charlton Athletic until 3 January 2011)

== Results ==
=== Pre-season ===
West Ham scheduled six friendly games away from home, both within the UK as well as two tour matches in Germany and Austria, in preparation for the 2010–11 Premier League season. They also played host to Spanish La Liga club Deportivo de La Coruña at the Boleyn Ground.

14 July 2010	Peterborough United	1–2	West Ham United	Peterborough
	Hibbert 49'	Report	Cole 13'; Edgar 65'	Stadium: London Road Stadium

17 July 2010	Borussia Mönchengladbach	0–2	West Ham United	Ruhpolding, Germany
		Report	Cole 33'; McCarthy 51'	Stadium: Waldstadion

23 July 2010	Panathinaikos	0–1	West Ham United	Kitzbühel, Austria
		Report	Hitzlsperger 43'	Stadium: Fussballplatz

28 July 2010	MK Dons	0–2	West Ham United	Milton Keynes
		Report	Faubert 70'; Cole 85'	Stadium: Stadium:mk

31 July 2010	Ipswich Town	0–1	West Ham United	Ipswich
		Report	Cole 31'	Stadium: Portman Road

3 August 2010	Southend United	1–1	West Ham United	Southend
	Grant 70'	Report	Diamanti 62'	Stadium: Roots Hall

7 August 2010	West Ham United	0–0 (5–3 p)	Deportivo La Coruña	London
		Report		Stadium: Upton Park
	Penalties
	Noble (penalty scored); Cole (penalty scored); Piquionne (penalty scored); Faubert (penalty scored); Barrera (penalty scored)		(penalty scored) Castro; (penalty scored) Rochela; (penalty missed) Valerón; (penalty scored) Colotto

=== Premier League ===
14 August 2010	Aston Villa	3–0	West Ham United	Birmingham
Saturday 15:00 BST	Downing 15'; Petrov 40'; Milner 66'	Report		Stadium: Villa Park; Attendance: 36,604; Referee: Mike Dean

21 August 2010	West Ham United	1–3	Bolton Wanderers	London
Saturday 15:00 BST	Noble 79' (pen.)	Report	Upson 49' (o.g.); Elmander 68', 84'	Stadium: Upton Park; Attendance: 32,533; Referee: Andre Marriner

28 August 2010	Manchester United	3–0	West Ham United	Manchester
Saturday 17:30 BST	Rooney 33' (pen.); Nani 50'; Berbatov 69'	Report		Stadium: Old Trafford; Attendance: 75,061; Referee: Mark Clattenburg

11 September 2010	West Ham United	1–3	Chelsea	London
Saturday 15:00 BST	Parker 85'	Report	Essien 2', 83'; Kalou 17'	Stadium: Upton Park; Attendance: 33,014; Referee: Chris Foy

18 September 2010	Stoke City	1–1	West Ham United	Stoke-on-Trent
Saturday 12:45 BST	Jones 48'		Parker 32'	Stadium: Britannia Stadium; Attendance: 27,028; Referee: Lee Mason

25 September 2010	West Ham United	1–0	Tottenham Hotspur	London
Saturday 15:00 BST	Piquionne 29'	Report		Stadium: Upton Park; Attendance: 34,190; Referee: Martin Atkinson

2 October 2010	West Ham United	1–1	Fulham	London
Saturday 15:00 BST	Piquionne 51'	Report	Dempsey 33'	Stadium: Upton Park; Attendance: 34,589; Referee: Andre Marriner

16 October 2010	Wolverhampton Wanderers	1–1	West Ham United	Wolverhampton
Saturday 15:00 BST	Jarvis 10'	Report	Noble 53' (pen.)	Stadium: Molineux; Attendance: 28,582; Referee: Mark Clattenburg

23 October 2010	West Ham United	1–2	Newcastle United	London
Saturday 17:30 BST	Cole 12'	Report	Nolan 23'; Carroll 69'	Stadium: Upton Park; Attendance: 34,486; Referee: Chris Foy

30 October 2010	Arsenal	1–0	West Ham United	London
Saturday 15:00 BST	Song (yellow card) 25', (goal) 88'; Chamakh (yellow card) 82'	Report	Ilunga (yellow card) 23'; Boa Morte (yellow card) 52'	Stadium: Emirates Stadium; Attendance: 60,086; Referee: Mike Jones

6 November 2010	Birmingham City	2–2	West Ham United	Birmingham
Saturday 15:00 GMT	Jerome 64'; Ridgewell 73'	Report	Piquionne 48'; Behrami 58'	Stadium: St Andrew's; Attendance: 26,474; Referee: Michael Oliver

10 November 2010	West Ham United	2–2	West Bromwich Albion	London
Wednesday 19:45 GMT	Parker 43'; Piquionne 50' (pen.)	Report	Odemwingie 38' (pen.); Ibáñez 71'	Stadium: Upton Park; Attendance: 33,023; Referee: Mike Dean

13 November 2010	West Ham United	0–0	Blackpool	London
Saturday 15:00 GMT		Report		Stadium: Upton Park; Attendance: 31,194; Referee: Kevin Friend

20 November 2010	Liverpool	3–0	West Ham United	Liverpool
Saturday 17:30 GMT	Johnson 18'; Kuyt 27' (pen.); Rodríguez 38'	Report		Stadium: Anfield; Attendance: 43,024; Referee: Lee Probert

27 November 2010	West Ham United	3–1	Wigan Athletic	London
Saturday 15:00 GMT	Behrami 34'; Obinna 56'; Parker 75'	Report	Cleverley 86'	Stadium: Upton Park; Attendance: 34,178; Referee: Mark Halsey

5 December 2010	Sunderland	1–0	West Ham United	Sunderland
Sunday 16:00 GMT	Henderson 34'	Report		Stadium: Stadium of Light; Attendance: 36,940; Referee: Martin Atkinson

11 December 2010	West Ham United	1–3	Manchester City	London
Saturday 15:00 GMT	Tomkins 89'	Report	Y. Touré 30'; Green 73' (o.g.); A. Johnson 81'	Stadium: Upton Park; Attendance: 32,813; Referee: Phil Dowd

18 December 2010	Blackburn Rovers	1–1	West Ham United	Blackburn
Saturday 15:00 GMT	Nelsen 51'	Report	Stanislas 78'	Stadium: Ewood Park; Attendance: 21,934; Referee: Mike Dean

26 December 2010	Fulham	1–3	West Ham United	London
Sunday 12:00 GMT	Hughes 11'	Report	Cole 37', 73'; Piquionne 45+1'	Stadium: Craven Cottage; Attendance: 25,332; Referee: Mark Halsey

28 December 2010	West Ham United	1–1	Everton	London
Tuesday 17:30 GMT	Hibbert 16' (o.g.)	Report	Coleman 42'	Stadium: Upton Park; Attendance: 33,422; Referee: Howard Webb

1 January 2011	West Ham United	2–0	Wolverhampton Wanderers	London
Saturday 15:00 GMT	Zubar 51' (o.g.); Sears 79'	Report		Stadium: Upton Park; Attendance: 33,500; Referee: Lee Probert

5 January 2011	Newcastle United	5–0	West Ham United	Newcastle upon Tyne
Wednesday 19:45 GMT	Best 18', 39', 60'; Nolan 45'; Løvenkrands 63'	Report		Stadium: St James' Park; Attendance: 42,387; Referee: Mike Dean

15 January 2011	West Ham United	0–3	Arsenal	London
Saturday 17:30 GMT		Report	Van Persie 13', 77' (pen.); Walcott 41'	Stadium: Upton Park; Attendance: 32,682; Referee: Andre Marriner

22 January 2011	Everton	2–2	West Ham United	Liverpool
Saturday 15:00 GMT	Bilyaletdinov 77'; Fellaini 90+1'	Report	Spector 26'; Piquionne 84', (yellow card) 82' (yellow-red card) 85'	Stadium: Goodison Park; Attendance: 34,179; Referee: Peter Walton

2 February 2011	Blackpool	1–3	West Ham United	Blackpool
Wednesday 20:00 GMT	Adam 42'		Obinna 24', 44'; Keane 37'	Stadium: Bloomfield Road; Attendance: 15,095; Referee: Stuart Attwell

6 February 2011	West Ham United	0–1	Birmingham City	London
Sunday 13:30 GMT		Report	Žigić 65'	Stadium: Upton Park; Attendance: 32,927; Referee: Chris Foy

12 February 2011	West Bromwich Albion	3–3	West Ham United	West Bromwich
Saturday 15:00 GMT	Dorrans 3'; Thomas 8'; Reid 32' (o.g.)	Report	Ba 50', 83'; Cole 58'	Stadium: The Hawthorns; Attendance: 23,916; Referee: Lee Mason

27 February 2011	West Ham United	3–1	Liverpool	London
Sunday 13:30 GMT	Parker 22'; Ba 45'; Cole 90'	Report	Johnson 84'	Stadium: Upton Park; Attendance: 34,941; Referee: Mark Halsey

5 March 2011	West Ham United	3–0	Stoke City	London
Saturday 15:00 GMT	Ba 21'; Da Costa 29'; Hitzlsperger 83'	Report		Stadium: Upton Park; Attendance: 33,066; Referee: Andre Marriner

19 March 2011	Tottenham Hotspur	0–0	West Ham United	London
Saturday 12:45 GMT		Report		Stadium: White Hart Lane; Attendance: 36,010; Referee: Mike Dean

2 April 2011	West Ham United	2–4	Manchester United	London
Saturday 12:45 BST	Noble 10' (pen.), 25' (pen.)	Report	Rooney 65', 73', 79' (pen.); Hernández 84'	Stadium: Upton Park; Attendance: 34,546; Referee: Lee Mason

9 April 2011	Bolton Wanderers	3–0	West Ham United	Bolton
Saturday 15:00 BST	Sturridge 13', 51'; Lee 20'	Report		Stadium: Reebok Stadium; Attendance: 25,857; Referee: Lee Probert

16 April 2011	West Ham United	1–2	Aston Villa	London
Saturday 15:00 BST	Keane 2'	Report	Bent 36'; Agbonlahor 90+1'	Stadium: Upton Park; Attendance: 34,672; Referee: Mark Halsey

23 April 2011	Chelsea	3–0	West Ham United	London
Saturday 17:30 BST	Lampard 44'; Torres 84'; Malouda 90+3'	Report		Stadium: Stamford Bridge; Attendance: 41,656; Referee: Phil Dowd

1 May 2011	Manchester City	2–1	West Ham United	Manchester
Sunday 16:10 BST	De Jong 10'; Zabaleta 15'	Report	Ba 33'	Stadium: Eastlands; Attendance: 44,511; Referee: Howard Webb

7 May 2011	West Ham United	1–1	Blackburn Rovers	London
Saturday 15:00 BST	Hitzlsperger 78'	Report	Roberts 12'	Stadium: Upton Park; Attendance: 33,789; Referee: Peter Walton

15 May 2011	Wigan Athletic	3–2	West Ham United	Wigan
Sunday 16:00 BST	N'Zogbia 57', 90+4'; Sammon 68'	Report	Ba 12', 26'	Stadium: DW Stadium; Attendance: 22,043; Referee: Mike Dean

22 May 2011	West Ham United	0–3	Sunderland	London
Sunday 16:00 BST		Report	Zenden 17'; Sessègnon 51'; Riveros 90+3'	Stadium: Upton Park; Attendance: 32,792; Referee: Anthony Taylor

=== Football League Cup ===
24 August 2010 R2	West Ham United	1–0	Oxford United	London
Tuesday 19:45 BST	Parker 90+3'	Report		Stadium: Upton Park; Attendance: 20,902; Referee: James Linington

21 September 2010 R3	Sunderland	1–2	West Ham United	Sunderland
Tuesday 19:45 BST	Gyan 41'	Report	Piquionne 35'; Obinna 59'	Stadium: Stadium of Light; Attendance: 21,907; Referee: Howard Webb

27 October 2010 R4	West Ham United	3–1 (a.e.t.)	Stoke City	London
Wednesday 19:45 BST	Parker 84'; Da Costa 96'; Obinna 118'	Report	Jones 6'	Stadium: Upton Park; Attendance: 25,304; Referee: Howard Webb

30 November 2010 R5	West Ham United	4–0	Manchester United	London
Tuesday 19:45 GMT	Spector 22', 37'; Cole 56', 66'	Report		Stadium: Upton Park; Attendance: 33,551; Referee: Mark Clattenburg

11 January 2011 Semi-Final first leg	West Ham United	2–1	Birmingham City	London
Tuesday	Noble 13'; Cole 78'; Obinna (red card) 59'	Report	Ridgewell 56'	Stadium: Upton Park; Attendance: 29,034; Referee: Phil Dowd

26 January 2011 Semi-Final second leg	Birmingham City	3–1 (a.e.t.) (4–3 agg.)	West Ham United	Birmingham
Wednesday	Bowyer 59'; Johnson 79'; Gardner 94'	Report	Cole 31'	Stadium: St Andrew's; Attendance: 27,519; Referee: Howard Webb

=== FA Cup ===
8 January 2011 R3	West Ham United	2–0	Barnsley	London
Saturday 15:00 GMT	Spector 29'; Piquionne 90+4'	Report		Stadium: Upton Park; Attendance: 32,159; Referee: Neil Swarbrick

30 January 2011 R4	West Ham United	3–2	Nottingham Forest	London
Sunday 14:00 GMT	Obinna 4', 42', 52' (pen.)	Report	Adebola 18'; McGoldrick 40'	Stadium: Upton Park; Attendance: 29,287; Referee: Michael Oliver

21 February 2011 R5	West Ham United	5–1	Burnley	London
Monday 20:00 GMT	Hitzlsperger 23'; Cole 48', 50'; Reid 59'; Sears 90'	Report	Rodriguez 71'	Stadium: Upton Park; Attendance: 30,000; Referee: Martin Atkinson

13 March 2011 QF	Stoke City	2–1	West Ham United	Stoke-on-Trent
Sunday 14:00 GMT	Huth 12'; Higginbotham 63'	Report	Piquionne 30'	Stadium: Britannia Stadium; Attendance: 24,550; Referee: Mike Jones

== Statistics ==
=== Overview ===
Competition	Record							
Competition	P	W	D	L	GF	GA	GD	Win %
Premier League	38	7	12	19	43	70	−27	18.42
FA Cup	4	3	0	1	11	5	+6	75.00
League Cup	6	5	0	1	13	6	+7	83.33
Total	48	15	12	21	67	81	−14	31.25

=== Goalscorers ===
Rank	Pos	No.	Nat	Name	Premier League	FA Cup	League Cup	Total
1	ST	9	(England)	Carlton Cole	5	2	4	11
2	ST	30	(France)	Frederic Piquionne	6	2	1	9
3	ST	33	(Nigeria)	Victor Obinna	3	3	2	8
4	MF	8	(England)	Scott Parker	5	0	2	7
4	ST	21	(Senegal)	Demba Ba	7	0	0	7
6	MF	16	(England)	Mark Noble	4	0	1	5
7	DF	18	(United States)	Jonathan Spector	1	1	2	4
8	MF	11	(Germany)	Thomas Hitzlsperger	2	1	0	3
9	ST	19	(England)	Freddie Sears	1	1	0	2
9	MF	21	(Switzerland)	Valon Behrami	2	0	0	2
9	DF	22	(Portugal)	Manuel da Costa	1	0	1	2
9	ST	34	(Republic of Ireland)	Robbie Keane	2	0	0	2
9	Own goals				2	0	0	2
14	DF	2	(New Zealand)	Winston Reid	0	1	0	1
14	DF	5	(England)	James Tomkins	1	0	0	1
14	MF	25	(England)	Junior Stanislas	1	0	0	1
Totals					43	11	13	67

=== League position by matchday ===
Matchday	1	2	3	4	5	6	7	8	9	10	11	12	13	14	15	16	17	18	19	20	21	22	23	24	25	26	27	28	29	30	31	32	33	34	35	36	37	38
Ground	A	H	A	H	A	H	H	A	H	A	A	H	H	A	H	A	H	A	A	H	H	A	H	A	A	H	A	H	H	A	H	A	H	A	A	H	A	H
Result	L	L	L	L	D	W	D	D	L	L	D	D	D	L	W	L	L	D	W	D	W	L	L	D	W	L	D	W	W	D	L	L	L	L	L	D	L	L
Position	18	19	20	20	20	19	20	20	20	20	20	20	20	20	20	20	20	20	19	19	15	20	20	20	18	20	19	18	17	17	18	18	19	20	20	20	20	20

A = Away; H = Home; W = Win; D = Draw; L = Loss

=== Appearances and goals ===
No.	Pos	Nat	Player	Total		Premier League		FA Cup		League Cup	
No.	Pos	Nat	Player	Apps	Goals	Apps	Goals	Apps	Goals	Apps	Goals
Goalkeepers
1	GK	(England) ENG	Robert Green	44	0	37	0	4	0	3	0
29	GK	(Czech Republic) CZE	Marek Stech	3	0	0	0	0	0	3	0
31	GK	(Belgium) BEL	Ruud Boffin	1	0	1	0	0	0	0	0
Defenders
2	DF	(New Zealand) NZL	Winston Reid	12	1	3+4	0	3	1	1+1	0
3	DF	(Israel) ISR	Tal Ben-Haim	12	0	8	0	0	0	4	0
4	DF	(Wales) WAL	Daniel Gabbidon	27	0	24+2	0	1	0	0	0
5	DF	(England) ENG	James Tomkins	28	1	18+1	1	3	0	6	0
15	DF	(England) ENG	Matthew Upson	34	0	30	0	1	0	3	0
18	DF	(United States) USA	Jonathan Spector	21	4	10+4	1	1+2	1	4	2
22	DF	(Portugal) POR	Manuel da Costa	19	2	14+2	1	1	0	2	1
23	DF	(Democratic Republic of the Congo) COD	Herita Ilunga	12	0	10+1	0	1	0	0	0
27	DF	(England) ENG	Jordan Spence	2	0	2	0	0	0	0	0
36	DF	(England) ENG	Wayne Bridge	18	0	15	0	2	0	1	0
37	DF	(Denmark) DEN	Lars Jacobsen	26	0	22+2	0	2	0	0	0
Midfielders
7	MF	(England) ENG	Kieron Dyer	13	0	8+3	0	0	0	0+2	0
8	MF	(England) ENG	Scott Parker	40	7	30+2	5	2+1	0	5	2
10	MF	(Wales) WAL	Jack Collison	3	0	2+1	0	0	0	0	0
11	MF	(Germany) GER	Thomas Hitzlsperger	13	3	11	2	2	1	0	0
12	MF	(Mexico) MEX	Pablo Barrera	21	0	6+8	0	2+1	0	4	0
13	MF	(Portugal) POR	Luis Boa Morte	28	0	19+3	0	1+1	0	4	0
14	MF	(Czech Republic) CZE	Radoslav Kovac	18	0	7+6	0	1	0	3+1	0
16	MF	(England) ENG	Mark Noble	35	5	25+1	4	4	0	3+2	1
20	MF	(France) FRA	Julien Faubert	16	0	7+2	0	1	0	6	0
21	MF	(Switzerland) SUI	Valon Behrami	8	2	6+1	2	0	0	0+1	0
25	MF	(England) ENG	Junior Stanislas	8	1	4+2	1	0	0	1+1	0
32	MF	(England) ENG	Gary O'Neil	9	0	7+1	0	0	0	0+1	0
40	MF	(England) ENG	Anthony Edgar	1	0	0	0	0+1	0	0	0
Forwards
9	FW	(England) ENG	Carlton Cole	43	11	21+14	5	2	2	3+3	4
17	FW	(South Africa) RSA	Benni McCarthy	9	0	0+6	0	0	0	1+2	0
19	FW	(England) ENG	Freddie Sears	15	2	9+2	1	2	1	2	0
21	FW	(Senegal) SEN	Demba Ba	13	7	10+2	7	1	0	0	0
24	FW	(England) ENG	Frank Nouble	4	0	0+2	0	1+1	0	0	0
26	FW	(England) ENG	Zavon Hines	15	0	4+5	0	1+2	0	1+2	0
30	FW	(France) FRA	Frederic Piquionne	41	9	26+8	6	2+2	2	3	1
32	FW	(Italy) ITA	Alessandro Diamanti	1	0	0+1	0	0	0	0	0
33	FW	(Nigeria) NGR	Victor Obinna	32	8	17+8	3	3	3	3+1	2
34	FW	(Republic of Ireland) IRL	Robbie Keane	10	2	5+4	2	0+1	0	0	0

== Transfers ==
=== Summer ===
==== In ====
#	Pos	Player	From	Fee	Date	Notes
11	MF	(Germany) Thomas Hitzlsperger	(Italy) Lazio	Free	1 July 2010	
12	FW	(Mexico) Pablo Barrera	(Mexico) UNAM	£4M	16 July 2010	
30	FW	(France) Frédéric Piquionne	(France) Lyon	Undisclosed	16 July 2010	
3	DF	(Israel) Tal Ben Haim	(England) Portsmouth	Loan	3 August 2010	
2	DF	(New Zealand) Winston Reid	(Denmark) Midtjylland	Undisclosed	5 August 2010	
33	FW	(Nigeria) Victor Obinna	(Italy) Internazionale	Loan	27 August 2010	
37	DF	(Denmark) Lars Jacobsen	(England) Blackburn Rovers	Free	31 August 2010	
31	GK	(Belgium) Ruud Boffin	(Netherlands) MVV	Nominal	31 August 2010	

==== Out ====
Pos	Player	To	Fee	Date	Notes
DF	(England) Bondz N'Gala	(England) Plymouth Argyle	Free	30 June 2010	
MF	(England) Josh Payne	(England) Doncaster Rovers	Free	30 June 2010	
FW	(Mexico) Guillermo Franco	(Argentina) Vélez Sársfield	Free	30 June 2010	
FW	(Brazil) Ilan	(Brazil) Internacional	Free	30 June 2010	
FW	(Italy) Alessandro Diamanti	(Italy) Brescia	€2.2M	24 August 2010	
DF	(Switzerland) Fabio Daprelà	(Italy) Brescia	Undisclosed	31 August 2010	

=== Winter ===
==== In ====
#	Pos	Player	From	Fee	Date	Notes
36	DF	(England) Wayne Bridge	(England) Manchester City	Loan	12 January 2011	
32	MF	(England) Gary O'Neil	(England) Middlesbrough	Undisclosed	24 January 2011	
21	FW	(Senegal) Demba Ba	(Germany) 1899 Hoffenheim	Undisclosed	28 January 2011	
34	FW	(Republic of Ireland) Robbie Keane	(England) Tottenham Hotspur	Loan	30 January 2011	

==== Out ====
Pos	Player	To	Fee	Date	Notes
FW	(England) Frank Nouble	(Wales) Swansea City	Loan	17 September 2010	
FW	(England) Freddie Sears	(England) Scunthorpe United	Loan	19 October 2010	
MF	(Switzerland) Valon Behrami	(Italy) Fiorentina	Undisclosed	25 January 2011	
MF	(England) Kieron Dyer	(England) Ipswich Town	Loan	11 March 2011	
FW	(South Africa) Benni McCarthy	(South Africa) Orlando Pirates	Contract terminated / Undisclosed	12 April 2011	
