= Julien Faubert =

French footballer (born 1983)

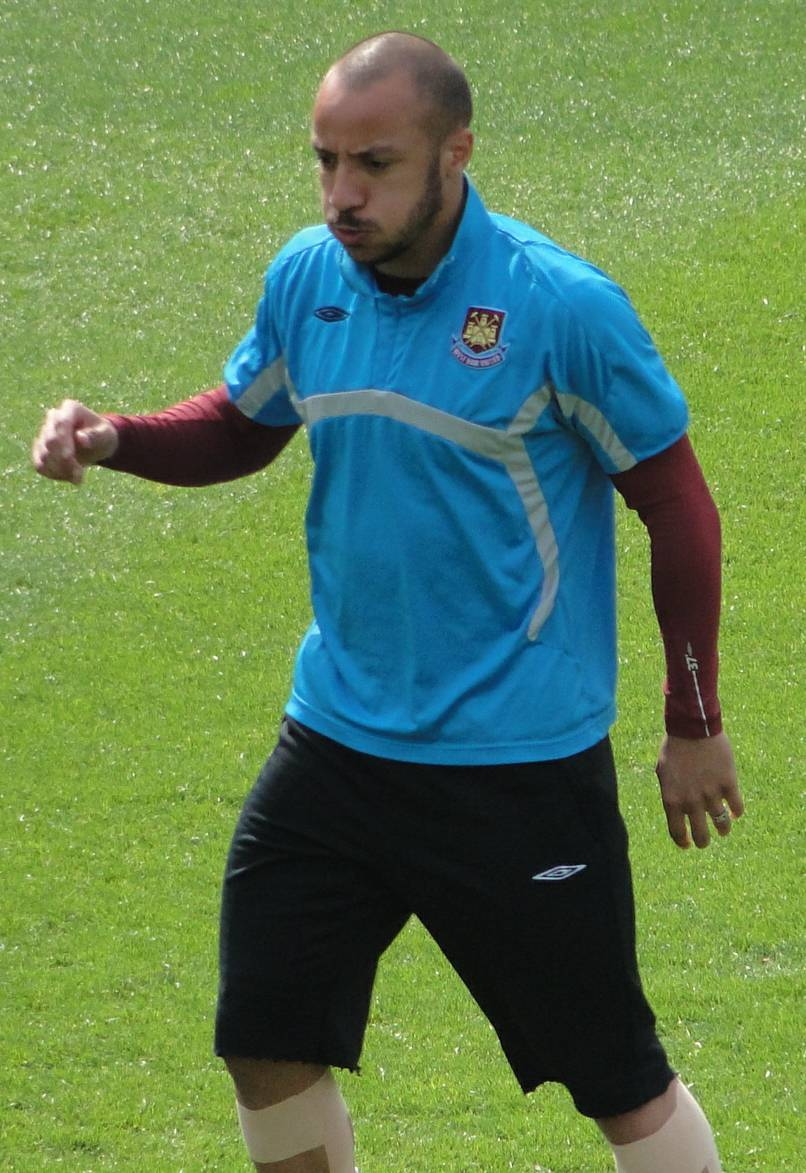
- Faubert warming up for West Ham United in 2010

Personal information
- Full name: Julien Alex Thomas Faubert
- Date of birth: 1 August 1983 (age 43)
- Place of birth: Le Havre, France
- Height: 1.80 m (5 ft 11 in)
- Position: Right-back

Youth career
- 1998–2002: Cannes

Senior career*
Years	Team	Apps	(Gls)
2002–2004	Cannes	45	(4)
2004–2007	Bordeaux	96	(10)
2007–2012	West Ham United	103	(2)
2009	→ Real Madrid (loan)	2	(0)
2012	Elazığspor	16	(1)
2013–2015	Bordeaux	48	(3)
2013–2015	Bordeaux II	3	(0)
2016	Kilmarnock	9	(0)
2017	Inter Turku	26	(1)
2018	Borneo	15	(3)
2019–2020	Fréjus Saint-Raphaël	2	(0)
Total		365	(24)

International career
2002–2004	France U21	17	(2)
2006	France	1	(1)
2014–2017	Martinique	10	(5)
- * Club domestic league appearances and goals

Julien Alex Thomas Faubert (born 1 August 1983) is a French former professional footballer who played as a right back. Born in France, he played in one match for the France national team, in which he scored, before switching allegiance to the Martinique national team in 2014.

Faubert started his footballing career in France with Cannes before moving to Bordeaux. In 2007, he moved to England to play for West Ham. In 2009, he spent a short period on loan with Real Madrid before returning to West Ham for the beginning of the 2009–10 season. He has also played football in Turkey (for Elazığspor), Scotland (for Kilmarnock F.C.), Finland (for FC Inter Turku) and Indonesia (for Borneo F.C.)

He is nicknamed "Le TGV" or "The Express Train" in France.

== Club career ==
=== Cannes and Bordeaux ===
Born in Le Havre, Faubert enrolled in the Cannes academy in 1998 and began his career as a right back or left back, but with his crossing ability quickly became a right winger as well as playing in a midfield role. He made his Cannes first team debut in the 2002–03 season. He steadily earned notoriety as an important member of the squad and eventually caught the eye of several Ligue 1 sides. Bordeaux signed him in 2004, with whom he played in 96 league matches, as well as in the UEFA Champions League.

=== West Ham United ===
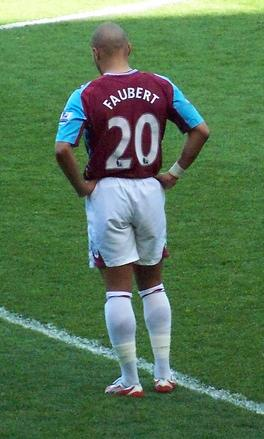
Faubert playing for West Ham United in 2008

On 23 June 2007, it was reported in French sports newspaper L'Équipe that Faubert was on the verge of a €6.5 million (£4.3 million) transfer to Rangers. On 1 July, however, he was signed by West Ham United for £6.1 million on a five-year contract. He suffered a ruptured achilles tendon during a pre-season friendly on 17 July against Czech side Sigma Olomouc, which was expected to take six months to heal. As part of his comeback, Faubert turned out for the reserves against Aston Villa's reserve team in January 2008. He finally made his first team debut for the Hammers as a late substitute against Fulham at Boleyn Ground on 12 January 2008. His first season in English football was marked by continuing injury and he made only eight appearances in the league and FA Cup.

=== On loan to Real Madrid ===
Faubert was given permission to speak to Real Madrid on 30 January 2009, with the move being completed on 31 January when he signed on loan until the end of the 2008–09 season for a reported fee of £1.5 million with an option for Real to purchase him on a three-year contract for an undisclosed fee. Faubert made his Real Madrid debut on 7 February 2009 in a 1–0 win against Racing de Santander. During his loan with Real Madrid, he missed training when he mistakenly thought he had the day off. His loan spell finished with only two appearances.

=== Return to West Ham ===
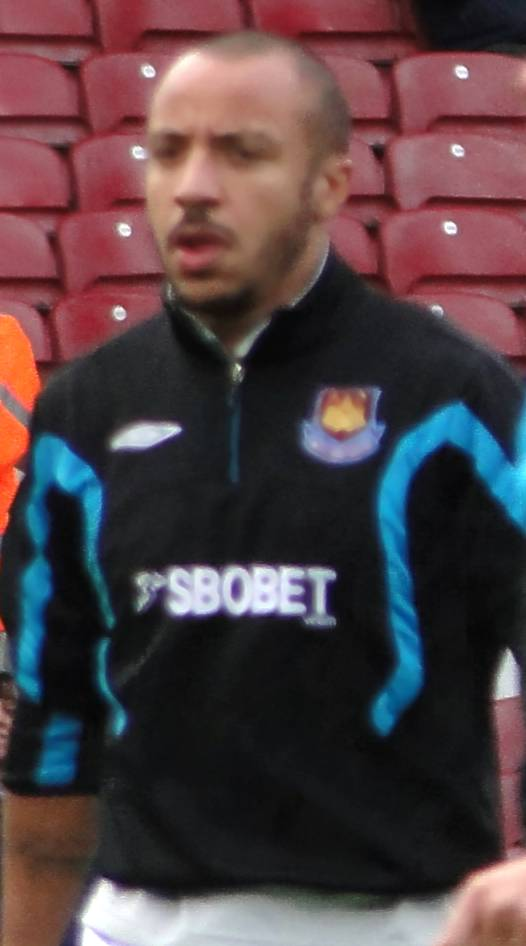
Faubert warming up for West Ham United in 2009

Faubert enjoyed a fine start to the 2009–10 season, helping the Hammers to victories over Wolverhampton Wanderers and Millwall and an impressive goalless draw at Blackburn Rovers. The 2009–10 season saw a change in fortunes for the Frenchman. He turned in several impressive performances, particularly in the second half of the season. He set up Carlton Cole with a measured cross for the second goal in a 2–0 win against Birmingham City. Faubert scored his first goal for the club on his 50th league game for the claret and blue against Hull City on 20 February 2010. He also added an assist in that game, producing a through ball, which Carlton Cole latched on to and dispatched accordingly. His sublime cross set up Ilan for an equalising goal against Everton on 4 April 2010. The Hammers were experiencing a poor run of form at the time. Faubert capped an accomplished season by winning the best 'Performance Of The Season' for his match-winning display against Hull. He was also awarded the SBOBET Player of the Month for August.

The 2010–11 season proved less successful for Faubert. He started the season playing on the right wing, reverting to right-back. On the last day of the summer 2011 transfer window, the Hammers recruited Blackburn Rovers full-back Lars Jacobsen who was preferred throughout the majority of the season. After the turn of the year, Faubert was in and out of the side. He did not help his chances of being selected when he left the stadium after learning he was not in the squad to face Birmingham City.

At the start of the 2011–12 season, Faubert was expected to leave the club after their relegation to the Championship. A tight hamstring ruled him out of the opening two games of the season but he made his first appearance on 16 August in an away match against Watford. Faubert came on as a 72-minute substitute, providing the assist for Scott Parker's goal to make it 4–0. During the rest of the season, he was West Ham's first choice right back and played a full part in West Ham's subsequent promotion. In May 2012, Faubert was released by West Ham due to the expiry of his contract. He played 121 games in all competitions for West Ham, scoring twice.

=== Elazığspor ===
On 27 June 2012, Faubert was officially signed by Elazığspor of the Turkish Süper Lig on a three-year contract.

=== Return to Bordeaux ===
After being released by Elazığspor, Faubert signed for his old club Bordeaux as a free agent on the transfer deadline day in January 2013, signing a contract that would keep him there until the end of the 2012–13 season. He was given squad number 22 due to his old number 18 was occupied by Jaroslav Plašil. Prior the move, Faubert asked his old club to train to maintain his fitness. Faubert made his first appearance at Bordeaux, coming on as a late substitute, as Bordeaux won 2–0 against Valenciennes. On 4 December 2013, Faubert scored in a 1–0 win over Guingamp.

=== Kilmarnock ===
After a trial period with St Johnstone during February 2016, Faubert signed for Kilmarnock until the end of the 2015–16 season. On 23 May 2016, he was one of six players released at the end of their contract.

=== Inter Turku ===
Faubert signed for Finnish Veikkausliiga side FC Inter Turku on a one-year contract on 17 January 2017.

=== Borneo ===
In January 2018, Faubert signed for Indonesian club Borneo in time for the 2018 Liga 1 season. In July 2018, Faubert was released by Borneo.

=== Étoile Fréjus Saint-Raphaël ===
In June 2019, Faubert accepted the role of player-assistant manager of Championnat National 2 club Étoile Fréjus Saint-Raphaël. He departed the role in January 2020.

== International career ==
Faubert made his debut for France on 16 August 2006 against Bosnia and Herzegovina. He wore the number 10 shirt, the first player to do so for France since the retirement of Zinedine Zidane. He marked his first match by scoring in the final minute of the game to ensure France won 2–1. Despite never receiving another call-up since then, Faubert has frequently stated his desire to return to the international scene with France.

In an interview with L'Équipe published on 24 December 2009, Faubert said that he was approached by the Algerian Football Federation (FAF) about representing the country due to his wife being Algerian. He said he would consider the option if he fails to get recalled by Les Bleus. Two days later, however, Algerian head coach Rabah Saadane denied that the FAF had made any contact with Faubert.

In October 2014, Faubert made his international debut for Martinique. Playing a 2014 Caribbean Cup qualification game against Curaçao, Faubert scored in a 1–1 draw, netting two braces in the following matches against Guadeloupe and Saint Vincent and the Grenadines.

== Personal life ==
Faubert is of Martiniquais descent and is married to a woman of Algerian descent. He is a devout Muslim, having converted to his wife's faith. He has the word "Allah" tattooed on his forearm.

== Career statistics ==
=== Club ===
Appearances and goals by club, season and competition
Club	Season	League			National Cup		League Cup		Europe		Other		Total	
Club	Season	Division	Apps	Goals	Apps	Goals	Apps	Goals	Apps	Goals	Apps	Goals	Apps	Goals
AS Cannes	2002–03	Championnat National	26	1	0	0	―		―		―		26	1
AS Cannes	2003–04	Championnat National	19	3	0	0	―		―		―		19	3
AS Cannes	Total		45	4	0	0	―		―		―		45	4
Bordeaux	2004–05	Ligue 1	36	1	1	0	1	0	―		―		38	1
Bordeaux	2005–06	Ligue 1	34	5	2	0	3	0	―		―		39	5
Bordeaux	2006–07	Ligue 1	26	3	1	0	3	0	8 (Note: 6 appearances and 2 goals in Champions League, 2 appearances in UEFA Cup)	2	―		38	5
Bordeaux	Total		96	10	4	0	7	0	8	2	―		115	12
West Ham United	2007–08	Premier League	7	0	1	0	0	0	―		―		8	0
West Ham United	2008–09	Premier League	20	0	2	0	2	0	―		―		24	0
West Ham United	2009–10	Premier League	33	1	1	0	2	0	―		―		36	1
West Ham United	2010–11	Premier League	9	0	1	0	6	0	―		―		16	0
West Ham United	2011–12	Championship	34	1	0	0	1	0	―		2 (Note: Appearances in Championship play-offs)	0	37	1
West Ham United	Total		103	2	5	0	11	0	―		2	0	121	2
Real Madrid (loan)	2008–09	La Liga	2	0	0	0	―		0	0	―		2	0
Elazığspor	2012–13	Süper Lig	16	1	0	0	―		―		―		16	1
Bordeaux	2012–13	Ligue 1	13	0	0	0	0	0	3 (Note: Appearances in Europa League)	0	―		16	0
Bordeaux	2013–14	Ligue 1	22	3	2	0	1	0	4	0	―		29	3
Bordeaux	2014–15	Ligue 1	13	0	1	0	1	0	―		―		15	0
Bordeaux	Bordeaux total		144	13	7	0	9	0	15	2	―		175	15
Bordeaux II	2013–14	Championnat de France Amateur Group D	1	0	―		―		―		―		1	0
Bordeaux II	2014–15	Championnat de France Amateur	2	0	―		―		―		―		2	0
Bordeaux II	Total		3	0	―		―		―		―		3	0
Kilmarnock	2015–16	Scottish Premiership	9	0	―		―		―		―		9	0
Inter Turku	2017	Veikkausliiga	26	1	5	0	―		―		―		31	1
Borneo	2018	Liga 1	15	3	0	0	―		―		―		15	3
Fréjus Saint-Raphaël	2019–20	Championnat National 2 Group D	2	0	0	0	―		―		―		2	0
Career total			362	24	17	0	20	0	15	2	2	0	416	24

=== International ===
==== International goals for France ====
Scores and results list France's goal tally first.

Goal	Date	Venue	Opponent	Score	Result	Competition
1.	16 August 2006	Asim Ferhatović Hase Stadium, Sarajevo	Bosnia and Herzegovina	2–1	2–1	Friendly

==== International goals for Martinique ====
Scores and results list Martinique's goal tally first.

Goal	Date	Venue	Opponent	Score	Result	Competition
1.	8 October 2014	Stade René Serge Nabajoth, Les Abymes	Curaçao	1–0	1–1	2014 Caribbean Cup qualification
2.	10 October 2014	Stade René Serge Nabajoth, Les Abymes	Guadeloupe	1–0	2–0	2014 Caribbean Cup qualification
3.	10 October 2014	Stade René Serge Nabajoth, Les Abymes	Guadeloupe	2–0	2–0	2014 Caribbean Cup qualification
4.	12 October 2014	Stade René Serge Nabajoth, Les Abymes	Saint Vincent and the Grenadines	3–3	4–3	2014 Caribbean Cup qualification
5.	12 October 2014	Stade René Serge Nabajoth, Les Abymes	Saint Vincent and the Grenadines	4–3	4–3	2014 Caribbean Cup qualification

== Honours ==
Bordeaux

- Coupe de la Ligue: 2006–07
- Coupe de France: 2012–13

West Ham United

- Football League Championship play-offs: 2012
