= Zavon Hines =

Jamaican-English footballer (born 1988)

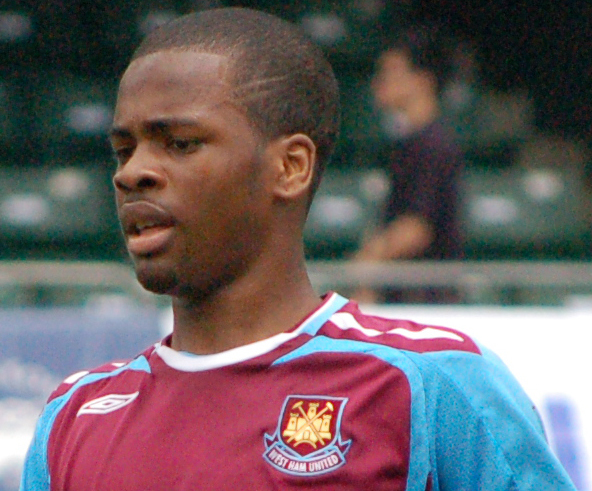
- Hines with West Ham United in 2008

Personal information
- Full name: Zavon Albert Hines
- Date of birth: 27 December 1988 (age 37)
- Place of birth: Kingston, Jamaica
- Height: 1.78 m (5 ft 10 in)
- Position: Winger

Youth career
- 2006–2007: West Ham United

Senior career*
Years	Team	Apps	(Gls)
2007–2011	West Ham United	22	(1)
2008	→ Coventry City (loan)	7	(1)
2011–2012	Burnley	13	(0)
2012	→ AFC Bournemouth (loan)	8	(1)
2012–2013	Bradford City	32	(2)
2013–2016	Dagenham & Redbridge	33	(6)
2016–2017	Southend United	5	(0)
2017	Maidstone United	20	(6)
2018	Chesterfield	28	(5)
2018–2019	Bromley	6	(0)
Total		174	(22)

International career
2009	England U21	2	(2)
- * Club domestic league appearances and goals

Zavon Albert Hines (born 27 December 1988) is a football coach and former professional footballer who played as a winger. He is currently assistant coach for the West Ham United under-18 team.

Born in Jamaica, Hines represented England at under-21 level. He began his career with West Ham United as a product of their youth team and has also played for Burnley, Bradford City and on loan at Coventry City and AFC Bournemouth.

== Club career ==
=== West Ham United ===
Hines was born in Jamaica and grew up in the East End of London. He had been playing youth and regular reserve team football for West Ham United before being spotted by Coventry City manager Chris Coleman, playing in a game for the reserves.

Hines had been on trial with Bury before he signed on loan for Coventry City on 27 March 2008. He was given first-team squad number 9, and made his first appearance in the 3–1 home defeat of Plymouth Argyle on 29 March. He scored his first goal in his second game for Coventry City on 1 April in a 1–1 draw with Sheffield Wednesday.

Hines made his first team debut for West Ham United against Macclesfield Town in a League Cup second round match on 27 August, scoring a goal. Hines missed much of the 2008–09 season with a knee injury but signed a new contract in March 2009, keeping him at the club until summer 2010. After playing in pre-season for the 2009–10 season, Hines was in the matchday squad for several matches and had played against Liverpool in September. He scored his first league goal for West Ham when he scored a 93rd-minute winner in a 2–1 victory over Aston Villa on 4 November 2009. Hines' 2009–10 season came to an end in January 2010 following an injury to his knee which required surgery. He returned to first-team football, after nearly a year out, on 30 November in a 4–0 win in the League Cup against Manchester United, and went on to make 15 league and cup appearances in the 2010–11 season. In the summer of 2011, Hines turned down the offer of a new contract and left the club. He had made a total of 31 league and cup appearances for West Ham, scoring three goals.

=== Burnley ===
Hines signed a two-year contract with Burnley in August 2011 with a compensation fee, estimated at £250,000, to be set by a tribunal owing to his young age. Hines said on joining Burnley: "I'm looking forward to playing for Burnley. It's all about me playing football now. ... Burnley seems like a good club to me so it wasn't really a hard decision to come here. ... I'm not a person who talks too much. I prefer to do it on the pitch, but I think I can do a lot in the Championship for Burnley." However, he did not gain a starting place in the first team and, after 13 appearances as a substitute in the Football League Championship, he joined Football League One side AFC Bournemouth in March 2012 on loan until the end of the 2011–12 season to gain more playing time. Hines said that, "It's been frustrating for me [at Burnley], I've played a few games but not enough." He made eight appearances for Bournemouth, scoring one goal. At the end of the season, Burnley chose not to take up the option of a second year on Hines' contract and he was released by the club. He had made 16 league and cup appearances for Burnley.

=== Bradford City ===
After being released by Burnley, Hines had a short trial with Swindon Town before signing a one-year contract with Bradford City along with Irish under-17 international defender Carl McHugh on 18 August. He made his league debut the same day against Gillingham, replacing Garry Thompson in the second half. He made his home debut on 21 August in a 1–0 win against Fleetwood Town. He scored his first goal for the club on 13 October, in a 1–1 draw against York City. On 8 January 2013, Hines was part of the side which beat Aston Villa 3–1 in the League Cup semi-final first leg. Hines featured until the 65th minute where he was substituted by West Ham United loanee Blair Turgott. On 22 January 2013, Hines was part of the side which lost to Aston Villa 2–1 in the League Cup semi-final second leg. Hines featured until the 71st minute where he was substituted by Garry Thompson. Bradford famously went on to win the tie 4–3 on aggregate sending them to League Cup final. Bradford's historic win was only the second time a team from the 4th tier of English football have reached the League Cup final with the other being Rochdale in 1962. At the end of the 2012–13 season, Hines was not offered a new contract and was released by Bradford.

On 27 July 2013, Hines began a trial period with Coventry City starting with an away friendly against Oxford United. Hines also trialled with MK Dons and featured for 73 minutes in their pre season friendly against a Tottenham XI on 31 July 2013.

=== Dagenham & Redbridge ===
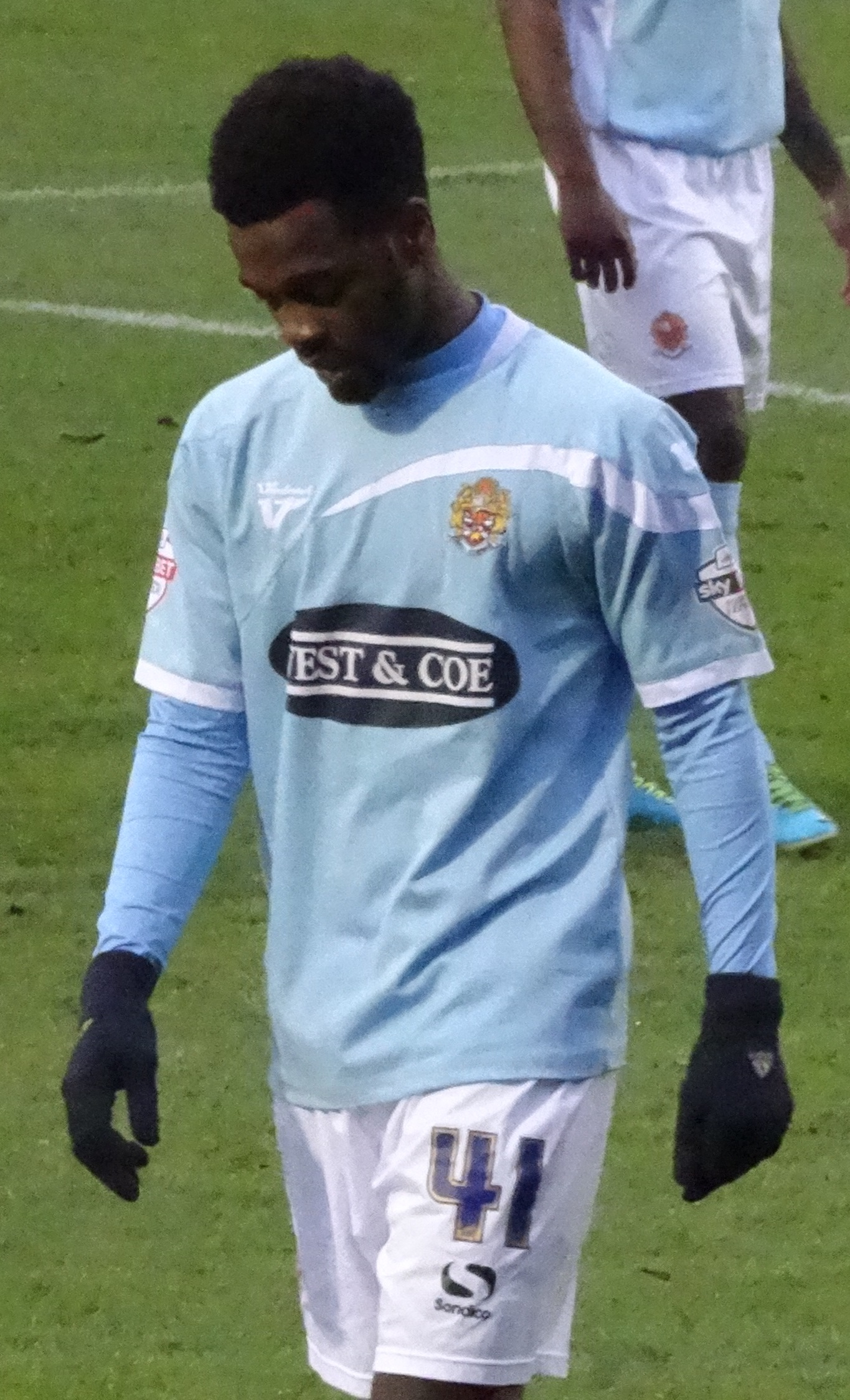
Hines playing for Dagenham & Redbridge in 2014

On 22 August 2013, Hines signed a one-year contract for Dagenham & Redbridge. He scored his first goal for the club on 4 October, in a 2–1 win away to Accrington Stanley. He scored twice in the following game, a 5–2 win away to Southend United in the Football League Trophy. In June 2014, he left Dagenham having failed to agree new terms to his contract after revealing that he wanted to play at a higher level. In August 2014 after failing to find another club, he re-joined the club and signed a new two-year contract. In May 2016 as his contract expired, he was released along with eleven players as Dagenham were relegated to the National League.

=== Southend United ===
On 20 December 2016, Hines signed for Southend United until the end of the 2016–17 season having completed a successful trial.

=== Maidstone United ===
On 18 August 2017, Hines joined National League side Maidstone United on a one-year deal. Hines was released early by the club having played 22 times in all competitions.

=== Chesterfield ===
On 4 January 2018, Hines signed an 18-month contract with Chesterfield. He left the club on 5 December 2018 after his contract was cancelled by mutual consent.

=== Bromley ===
On 7 December 2018, Hines joined fellow National League side Bromley.

On 4 February 2019, Hines announced his retirement due to injury.

== International career ==
On 10 February 2009, Hines was called into the Jamaica team for their friendly international against Nigeria on 11 February. The game finished 0–0 and Hines did not play. Despite having been selected in a Jamaican squad, on 1 October, Hines was called up for the England under-21 team for a game against the Macedonia under-21 team on 9 October, played at the Ricoh Arena, Coventry. Hines came on as a second-half substitute, for Theo Walcott, and scored twice on his under-21 debut, in their 6–3 victory.

== Coaching career ==
In 2019, Hines returned to West Ham United as a coach for their under-14 team.

== Personal life ==
Born in Jamaica, Hines has a British passport.

== Career statistics ==
As of match played 5 January 2019

Appearances and goals by club, season and competition
Club	Season	League			FA Cup		League Cup		Other		Total	
Club	Season	Division	Apps	Goals	Apps	Goals	Apps	Goals	Apps	Goals	Apps	Goals
West Ham United	2007–08	Premier League	0	0	0	0	0	0	—		0	0
West Ham United	2008–09	Premier League	0	0	0	0	1	1	—		1	1
West Ham United	2009–10	Premier League	13	1	0	0	2	1	—		15	2
West Ham United	2010–11	Premier League	9	0	3	0	3	0	—		15	0
West Ham United	Total		22	1	3	0	6	2	—		31	3
Coventry City (loan)	2007–08	Championship	7	1	—		—		—		7	1
Burnley	2011–12	Championship	13	0	0	0	3	0	—		16	0
AFC Bournemouth (loan)	2011–12	League One	8	1	—		—		—		8	1
Bradford City	2012–13	League Two	32	2	2	0	6	0	1 (Note: Appearances in Football League Trophy)	0	41	2
Dagenham & Redbridge	2013–14	League Two	27	6	1	0	0	0	3	2	31	8
Dagenham & Redbridge	2014–15	League Two	0	0	0	0	0	0	0	0	0	0
Dagenham & Redbridge	2015–16	League Two	6	0	0	0	0	0	1	0	7	0
Dagenham & Redbridge	Total		33	6	1	0	0	0	4	2	38	8
Southend United	2016–17	League One	5	0	—		—		—		5	0
Maidstone United	2017–18	National League	20	6	4	2	—		0	0	24	8
Chesterfield	2017–18	League Two	11	1	—		—		—		11	1
Chesterfield	2018–19	National League	17	4	4	0	—		—		21	4
Chesterfield	Total		28	5	4	0	—		—		32	5
Bromley	2018–19	National League	6	0	—		—		0	0	6	0
Career total			174	22	14	2	15	2	5	2	208	28

== Honours ==
Bradford City

- Football League Two play-offs: 2013
- Football League Cup runner-up: 2012–13

Individual

- West Ham United Young Player of the Year: 2009–10
- Football League Two Player of the Month: November 2013
