= James Tomkins (footballer) =

English footballer (born 1989)

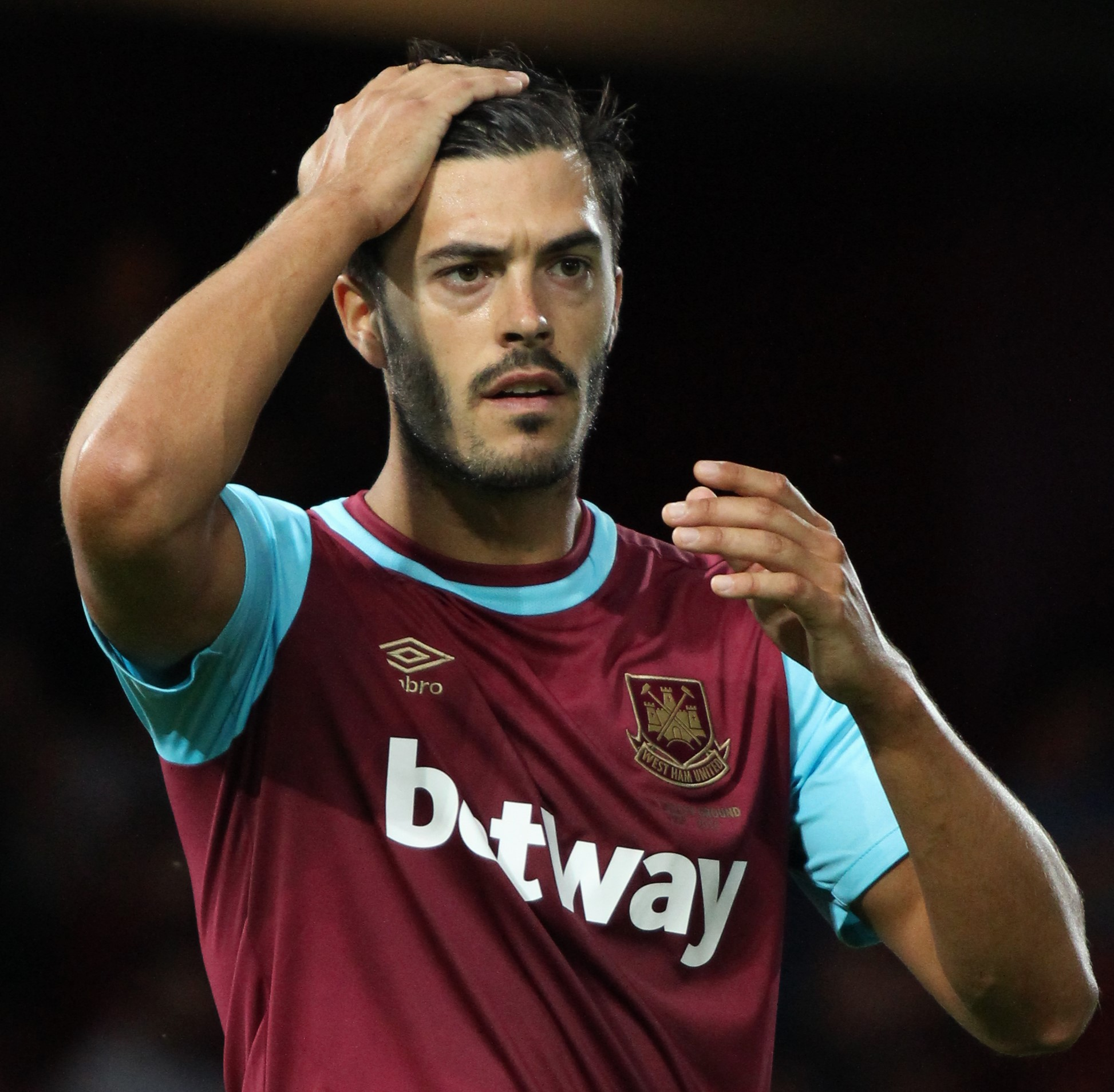
- Tomkins playing for West Ham United in 2015

Personal information
- Full name: James Oliver Charles Tomkins
- Date of birth: 29 March 1989 (age 37)
- Place of birth: Basildon, England
- Height: 6 ft 4 in (1.92 m)
- Position: Centre-back

Youth career
- 1997–2008: West Ham United

Senior career*
Years	Team	Apps	(Gls)
2008–2016	West Ham United	208	(8)
2008	→ Derby County (loan)	7	(0)
2016–2024	Crystal Palace	125	(10)
Total		340	(18)

International career
2004–2005	England U16	4	(0)
2004–2006	England U17	13	(0)
2006	England U18	1	(0)
2007–2008	England U19	8	(0)
2009	England U20	1	(0)
2009–2011	England U21	10	(0)
2012	Great Britain Olympic	2	(0)
Medal record
Men's football
Representing England
UEFA European Under-21 Championship
Runner-up	2009 Sweden
- * Club domestic league appearances and goals

James Oliver Charles Tomkins (born 29 March 1989) is an English former professional footballer who played as a centre-back.

A product of the West Ham youth academy, Tomkins debuted for the West Ham senior side in 2008, joining Derby County on loan later that year. In 2016, he moved to Crystal Palace, where he was mainly used as a backup defender during his eight-year spell with the club. In March 2025, he retired from football.

Tomkins represented England at all levels up to the under-21 team and represented Great Britain at the 2012 London Olympics.

== Club career ==
=== West Ham United ===
==== Early years and club debut ====
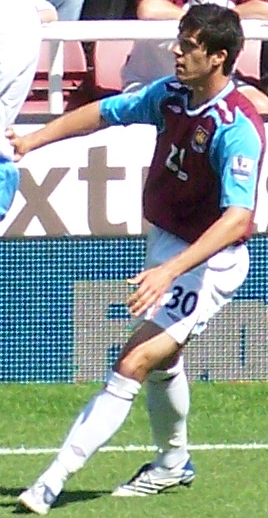
Tomkins playing for West Ham United in 2008

Aged seven, Tomkins was spotted while playing for his local Sunday League side and signed into West Ham United's youth academy. Initially a striker, he eventually switched to his current position in central defence. He signed scholarship forms in 2005. Prior to making his first-team debut, his career had been marred by several injuries.

Tomkins made his Premier League debut on 22 March 2008 in a 1–1 draw away to Everton. Although his costly slip allowed Yakubu to score the opening goal, He made five more starts and a substitute appearance. As first choice centre backs James Collins, Danny Gabbidon and Matthew Upson were all out injured during various times in the season, he enjoyed an extended run in the first team for the remainder of the season, winning the Young Hammer of the Year for 2007–08.

==== 2008–09 season ====
On 27 November, Tomkins signed for Derby County on a five-week loan spell. He made his debut for Derby in their 3–0 away defeat to Burnley on 29 November 2008. He played 8 times in all competitions for Derby County during his loan spell, before being recalled to West Ham on 31 December 2008 by manager Gianfranco Zola. After his stint with Derby, he started to feature regularly with the Hammers first-team. On 21 March 2009, he started and played the full 90 minutes alongside Jonathan Spector in a 1–1 draw with Blackburn Rovers at Ewood Park. Initially desputising for the injured Collins, he managed to stake his claim ahead of the Welsh international, and on 4 April 2009, scored his first senior goal, a header from Mark Noble's corner, in a 2–0 win over Sunderland. The same month, he and several fellow youth products were awarded long-term contract extensions.

==== 2009–10 season ====
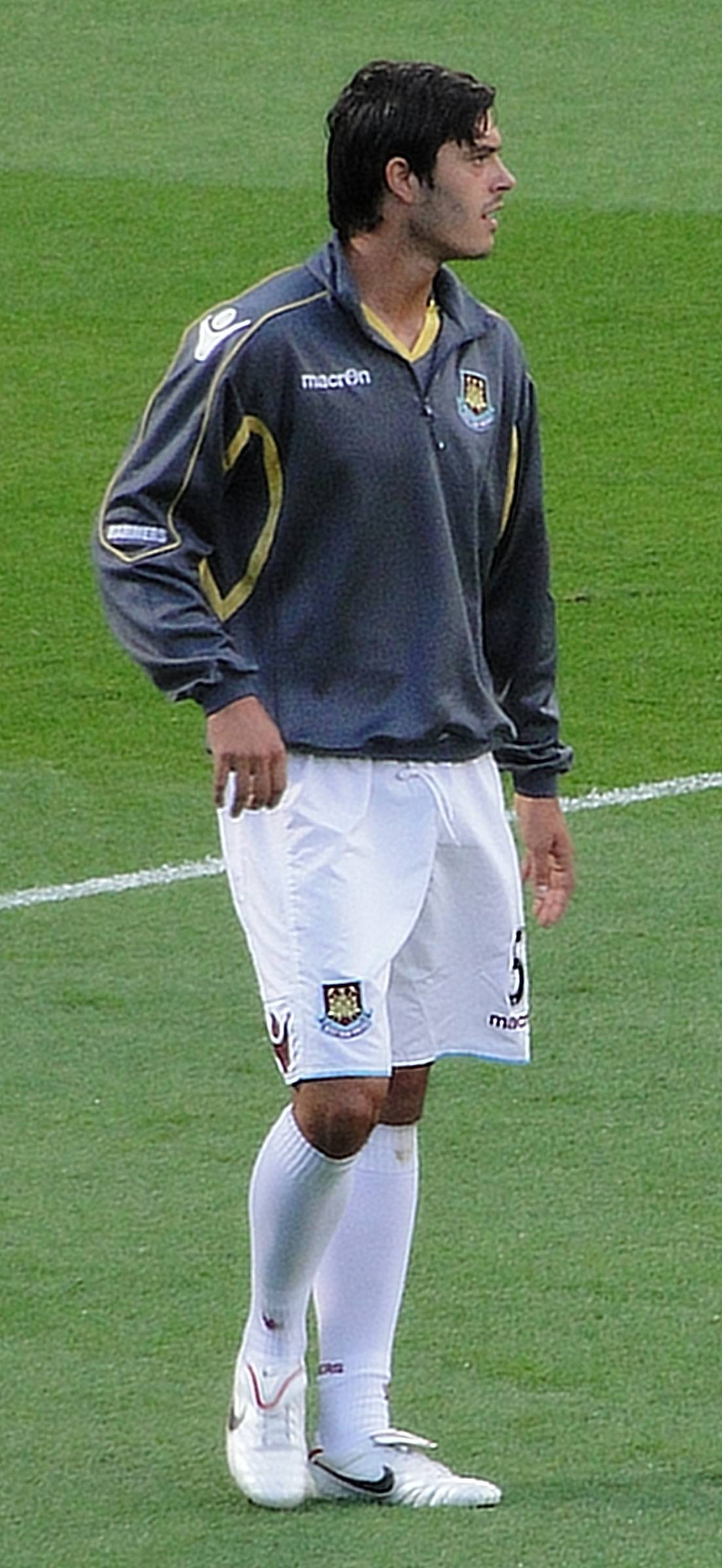
Tomkins training with West Ham United in 2010

After the departure of James Collins and with Danny Gabbidon injured, Tomkins retained his place in the starting eleven at the beginning of the 2009–10 season, losing it to new signing Manuel da Costa for several games. He regained his place, starting alongside captain Matthew Upson. He was named Man of the Match by Sky Sports as he and Upson helped keep the Hammers' first clean sheet of the year in the away draw against Aston Villa on 17 January 2010.

==== 2010–11 season ====
Tomkins made 28 appearances in all competitions in the 2010–11 season scoring once against Manchester City at Upton Park. On 1 January 2011, he made his 50th first-team appearance for West Ham in a 2–0 victory over Wolverhampton Wanderers.

==== 2011–12 season ====
It was the 2011–12 season that Tomkins found his feet in the West Ham United first team, forging a partnership at the back with New Zealand's Winston Reid. He scored the first goal in the 4–0 win against Watford at Vicarage Road and also received WHUFC player of the month for August, the opening month of the season. During the 2011–12 season, he was linked with a £4 million move to both Queens Park Rangers and Newcastle United of the Premier League, but the speculation soon ended about his future when he signed a new four-and-a-half-year deal at West Ham on 21 January running until summer 2016. After signing he also proved his commitment and love for the club by saying "I'm a local boy and have come through the ranks at the club and loyalty is a far bigger currency to me than money". For his outstanding performance in the 2011–12 Championship season he was voted by his fellow professionals into the PFA Championship Team of the Year, along with fellow Hammer Mark Noble. He was also voted runner-up Hammer of the Year by West Ham fans, losing out to Mark Noble.

==== 2014–15 season ====
In 2015, Tomkins signed a new, long-term contract which would keep him with West Ham until 2020. Shortly after he dislocated his shoulder in training, an injury which was expected to keep him from playing for several weeks. In March, he received surgery for the same injury. He played 25 games in all competitions for West Ham including three FA Cup games. He scored a single goal, in a 2–1 away win against West Bromwich Albion on 2 December 2014. His shoulder injury kept him out of the side from March 2015, finally returning for the last game of the season, replacing Reece Burke in the 69th minute, a 2–0 away defeat to Newcastle United.

==== 2015–16 season ====
Tomkins opened the 2015–16 season by scoring the third goal in a UEFA Europa League game on 2 July 2015. West Ham won the game against Andorran team Lusitanos 3–0 with him as captain and with the other goals coming from Diafra Sakho. On 16 July 2015, he scored another UEFA Europa League goal in the 1–0 win over Bikirkara in the 90th minute. In the second-leg, in Malta, on 23 July 2015, he was sent-off after pushing Birkirkara's Nikola Vukanac as West Ham went through to the next round, 5–3 on penalties.

=== Crystal Palace and retirement ===
On 5 July 2016, Tomkins joined London rivals Crystal Palace on a five-year deal for a fee of £10 million. He had played for West Ham for over 20 years from boyhood right up to 2016, he made 243 appearances for West Ham's senior team. In October 2019, Tomkins signed a contract extension keeping him at Crystal Palace until the end of the 2021–22 season.

On 12 December 2021, Tomkins scored in Palace's 3–1 win over Everton. In June 2022, he signed a further extension with Palace, keeping him at the club until 2023.

Tomkins made a total of 4 league appearances for Palace in the 2023–24 season, mainly being a backup defender and spending most of the campaign on the bench. On 5 June 2024, Crystal Palace announced that Tomkins would leave the club when his contract expired in the summer.

On 24 March 2025, Tomkins announced his retirement from professional football at the age of 35.

== International career ==
=== England U21 ===
Tomkins has represented England at U15, U16, U17, U19 and U21 levels and played in every match of the 2008 UEFA U-19 Championships along with club mate Freddie Sears. His U21 debut came on 8 June 2009 in the 7–0 home win against the Azerbaijan U21 team. He was called up for the 2009 UEFA U-21 Championships as back up after the withdrawals of first-choice centre backs Steven Taylor and David Wheater through injury. After the tournament, he was recalled to the squad and regularly partnered Michael Mancienne in defence. He was called up for several European Championship qualifiers but withdrew after being ruled out with an injury sustained during training.

=== Great Britain Olympic team ===
After the success of the 2011–12 Championship season, where Tomkins was named in the PFA Championship Team of the Year and was the runner-up for the Hammer of the Year, he was called for the final squad for Great Britain's Olympic football squad for the London Olympics 2012. He played twice for the Great Britain Team. On 20 July 2012 he played the first half in a 2–0 defeat to Brazil in a warm-up game and on 29 July 2012 in a 3–1 victory against UAE. He blamed his inclusion in the Olympic squad and lack of games on a loss of form at the start of the 2012–13 West Ham season.

== Personal life ==
Tomkins was born in Basildon, Essex. On 23 December 2013 Tomkins was charged with the assault of a police officer, resisting arrest and being drunk and disorderly following an incident on 22 December at the Sugar Hut nightclub in Brentwood, Essex. He was bailed until 9 January 2014 to appear at Basildon Magistrates Court. Tomkins averted the need for a trial by pleading guilty to assaulting a police constable, being drunk and disorderly in a public place and obstructing a constable. On 29 September 2014, he was fined £7,605 for the incident.

== Career statistics ==
Appearances and goals by club, season and competition
Club	Season	League			FA Cup		League Cup		Europe		Other		Total	
Club	Season	Division	Apps	Goals	Apps	Goals	Apps	Goals	Apps	Goals	Apps	Goals	Apps	Goals
West Ham United	2007–08	Premier League	6	0	0	0	0	0	—		—		6	0
West Ham United	2008–09	Premier League	12	1	3	0	0	0	—		—		15	1
West Ham United	2009–10	Premier League	23	0	1	0	2	0	—		—		26	0
West Ham United	2010–11	Premier League	19	1	3	0	6	0	—		—		28	1
West Ham United	2011–12	Championship	44	4	0	0	0	0	—		3 (Note: Appearances in Championship play-offs)	0	47	4
West Ham United	2012–13	Premier League	26	1	2	0	1	0	—		—		29	1
West Ham United	2013–14	Premier League	31	0	0	0	4	0	—		—		35	0
West Ham United	2014–15	Premier League	22	1	3	0	0	0	—		—		25	1
West Ham United	2015–16	Premier League	25	0	2	1	1	0	4 (Note: Appearances in UEFA Europa League)	2	—		32	3
West Ham United	Total		208	8	14	1	14	0	4	2	3	0	243	11
Derby County (loan)	2008–09	Championship	7	0	—		—		—		—		7	0
Crystal Palace	2016–17	Premier League	24	3	2	0	1	0	—		—		27	3
Crystal Palace	2017–18	Premier League	28	3	0	0	2	0	—		—		30	3
Crystal Palace	2018–19	Premier League	29	1	1	0	0	0	—		—		30	1
Crystal Palace	2019–20	Premier League	18	1	1	0	0	0	—		—		19	1
Crystal Palace	2020–21	Premier League	8	0	1	0	0	0	—		—		9	0
Crystal Palace	2021–22	Premier League	8	1	0	0	1	0	—		—		9	1
Crystal Palace	2022–23	Premier League	6	1	0	0	1	0	—		—		7	1
Crystal Palace	2023–24	Premier League	4	0	0	0	1	0	—		—		5	0
Crystal Palace	Total		125	10	5	0	6	0	—		—		136	10
Career total			340	18	19	1	20	0	4	2	3	0	386	21

== Honours ==
West Ham United

- Football League Championship play-offs: 2012

Individual

- West Ham United Young Player of the Year: 2007–08
- PFA Team of the Year: 2011–12 Championship
