= 2009–10 West Ham United F.C. season =

English football team season

West Ham United
2009–10 season
- Co-chairmen: David Gold; David Sullivan
- Manager: Gianfranco Zola
- Ground: Boleyn Ground (Upton Park)
- Premier League: 17th
- FA Cup: Third round
- League Cup: Third round
- Top goalscorer: League: Carlton Cole (10); All: Carlton Cole (10)
- Highest home attendance: 34,989 (vs. Manchester City, 9 May)
- Lowest home attendance: 24,492 (vs. Millwall, 25 August)
Home colours	Away colours

The 2009–10 Premier League was West Ham United's fifth consecutive season in the Premier League, following a ninth-placed finish in the 2008–09 Premier League. They were managed by Gianfranco Zola - in his second season after replacing Alan Curbishley in September 2008.

== Season summary ==
The Hammers won their first Premier League game of the season against Wolverhampton Wanderers at Molineux, but failed to win another until early November after an injury time winner from Zavon Hines sealed an upset victory against Aston Villa.

The Upton Park riots took place in West Ham's first Football League Cup game on 25 August against fierce rivals Millwall. The club was fined £115,000 after pitch invasions and brawling, resulting in a Millwall fan being stabbed. West Ham won the game 3–1 after extra time.

On 19 January 2010, former Birmingham City owners David Gold and David Sullivan completed a joint takeover of West Ham United from cash-strapped Icelandic owner Björgólfur Guðmundsson.

West Ham's mid-season form was patchy, but a loss at Old Trafford began a string of six consecutive losses to put them in relegation danger. The run was broken by a late equaliser in a 2–2 draw at Everton, followed by a 1–0 win at home against Sunderland. Another poor game at Anfield was a minor hiccup in West Ham's quest for survival, as they then earned three points against Wigan Athletic in a hard-fought 3–2 win. Simultaneously, Hull City blew an opportunity against Sunderland, losing 1–0. West Ham's Premier League status was confirmed on 3 May with Hull's 2–2 draw with Wigan, which left them five points behind West Ham with one game left to play.

West Ham's away record of only one away win all season equalled their lowest number of away wins for a season, previously set in 1960–61. On 11 May 2010, two days after the end of the season, the club announced the termination of their manager Gianfranco Zola's contract with immediate effect.

== Final league table ==
Pos	Team	Pld	W	D	L	GF	GA	GD	Pts	Qualification or relegation
15	Wolverhampton Wanderers	38	9	11	18	32	56	−24	38	
16	Wigan Athletic	38	9	9	20	37	79	−42	36	
17	West Ham United	38	8	11	19	47	66	−19	35	
18	Burnley (R)	38	8	6	24	42	82	−40	30	Relegation to Football League Championship
19	Hull City (R)	38	6	12	20	34	75	−41	30	Relegation to Football League Championship

Source: Barclays Premier League
(R) Relegated

== First-team squad ==
Note: Flags indicate national team as defined under FIFA eligibility rules; some limited exceptions apply. Players may hold more than one non-FIFA nationality.

No.	Pos.	Nation	Player
1	GK	ENG	Robert Green
4	DF	WAL	Danny Gabbidon
7	MF	ENG	Kieron Dyer
8	MF	ENG	Scott Parker (vice-captain)
9	FW	BRA	Ilan
10	FW	MEX	Guillermo Franco
11	FW	EGY	Mido (on loan from Middlesbrough)
12	FW	ENG	Carlton Cole
13	MF	POR	Luís Boa Morte
14	MF	CZE	Radoslav Kováč
15	DF	ENG	Matthew Upson (captain)
16	MF	ENG	Mark Noble
17	FW	RSA	Benni McCarthy
18	DF	USA	Jonathan Spector
20	MF	FRA	Julien Faubert

No.	Pos.	Nation	Player
21	MF	SUI	Valon Behrami
22	DF	POR	Manuel da Costa
23	DF	COD	Hérita Ilunga
28	GK	HUN	Péter Kurucz
29	GK	CZE	Marek Štěch
30	DF	ENG	James Tomkins
31	MF	WAL	Jack Collison
32	MF	ITA	Alessandro Diamanti
33	DF	SUI	Fabio Daprelà
35	MF	ENG	Josh Payne
36	MF	ENG	Anthony Edgar
41	FW	ENG	Zavon Hines
45	DF	ENG	Jordan Spence
46	MF	ENG	Junior Stanislas
-	MF	CHI	Luis Jimenez (on loan from Inter)

=== Out on loan ===
Note: Flags indicate national team as defined under FIFA eligibility rules; some limited exceptions apply. Players may hold more than one non-FIFA nationality.

No.	Pos.	Nation	Player
19	FW	ENG	Freddie Sears (on loan to Coventry City)
24	FW	ENG	Frank Nouble (on loan to Swindon Town)
44	DF	ENG	Bondz Ngala (on loan to Plymouth Argyle)

No.	Pos.	Nation	Player
—	DF	ISL	Hólmar Örn Eyjólfsson (on loan to Roeselare)
—	DF	ENG	Matt Fry (on loan to Charlton Athletic)

== Results ==
=== Preseason ===
West Ham took part in a pre-season training camp in Austria and Slovenia, and had scheduled four pre-season games; however, the game against Bundesliga side Werder Bremen was called off due to wet weather. West Ham also took place in the 2009 Barclays Asia Trophy, where they finished third.

15 July 2009	SVL Flavia Solva	1 – 1	West Ham United	Roman Stadium, Wagna, Austria
	Ploschnik 16'	Report	Collison 30' (pen.)

22 July 2009	Bursaspor	1 – 1	West Ham United	Thermenarena, Bad Radkersburg, Austria
	Bahadır 54'	Report	Dyer 3'

23 July 2009	ND Mura 05	0 – 0	West Ham United	Fazanerija, Murska Sobota, Slovenia
		Report

8 August 2009	West Ham United	0 – 1	Napoli	Boleyn Ground
		Report	Quagliarella 78'

==== 2009 Barclays Asia Trophy ====
29 July 2009	West Ham United	0 – 1	Tottenham Hotspur	Workers Stadium, Beijing
		Report	Defoe 74'	Attendance: 10,005; Referee: Andre Marriner

31 July 2009	West Ham United	2 – 0	Beijing Guoan	Workers Stadium, Beijing
	Gabbidon 80'; Hines 90'	Report		Attendance: 7,501; Referee: (China) Sun Baojie

=== Premier League ===
15 August 2009 1	Wolverhampton Wanderers	0 – 2	West Ham United	Molineux
		Report	Noble 22'; Upson 69'	Attendance: 28,674; Referee: Chris Foy

23 August 2009 2	West Ham United	1 – 2	Tottenham Hotspur	Boleyn Ground
	Cole 49'	Report	Defoe 54'; Lennon 79'	Attendance: 33,095; Referee: Mark Clattenburg

29 August 2009 3	Blackburn Rovers	0 – 0	West Ham United	Ewood Park
		Report		Attendance: 23,421; Referee: Phil Dowd

12 September 2009 4	Wigan Athletic	1 – 0	West Ham United	DW Stadium
	Rodallega 55'	Report		Attendance: 17,142; Referee: Alan Wiley

19 September 2009 5	West Ham United	2 – 3	Liverpool	Boleyn Ground
	Diamanti 29' (pen.); Cole 45'	Report	Torres 20', 75'; Kuyt 41'	Attendance: 34,658; Referee: Andre Marriner

28 September 2009 6	Manchester City	3 – 1	West Ham United	City of Manchester Stadium
	Tevez 5', 61'; Petrov 32'	Report	Cole 24'	Attendance: 42,745; Referee: Chris Foy

4 October 2009 7	West Ham United	2 – 2	Fulham	Boleyn Ground
	Cole 16'; Stanislas 90+2'	Report	Murphy 47' (pen.); Gera 57'	Attendance: 32,612; Referee: Phil Dowd

17 October 2009 8	Stoke City	2 – 1	West Ham United	Britannia Stadium
	Beattie 11' (pen.), 69'	Report	Upson 34'	Attendance: 27,026; Referee: Martin Atkinson

25 October 2009 9	West Ham United	2 – 2	Arsenal	Boleyn Ground
	Cole 74'; Diamanti 80' (pen.)	Report	van Persie 16'; Gallas 37'	Attendance: 34,442; Referee: Chris Foy

31 October 2009 10	Sunderland	2 – 2	West Ham United	Stadium of Light
	Reid 39'; Richardson 76'	Report	Franco 30'; Cole 36'	Attendance: 39,033; Referee: Andre Marriner

4 November 2009 11	West Ham United	2 – 1	Aston Villa	Boleyn Ground
	Noble 45+3' (pen.); Hines 90+3'	Report	A. Young 52'	Attendance: 30,024; Referee: Steve Bennett

8 November 2009 12	West Ham United	1 – 2	Everton	Boleyn Ground
	Stanislas 65'	Report	Saha 27'; Gosling 64'	Attendance: 32,466; Referee: Alan Wiley

21 November 2009 13	Hull City	3 – 3	West Ham United	KC Stadium
	Bullard 27', 45+1' (pen.); Zayatte 44'; Mendy (red card) 54'	Report	Franco 5'; Collison 11'; Da Costa 69'	Attendance: 24,909; Referee: Mark Clattenburg

28 November 2009 14	West Ham United	5 – 3	Burnley	Boleyn Ground
	Collison 18'; Stanislas 33'; Cole 43' (pen.); Franco 51'; Jiménez 64' (pen.)	Report	Fletcher 68', 74'; Eagles 90+5'	Attendance: 34,003; Referee: Chris Foy

5 December 2009 15	West Ham United	0 – 4	Manchester United	Boleyn Ground
		Report	Scholes 45+1'; Gibson 61'; Valencia 71'; Rooney 72'	Attendance: 34,980; Referee: Peter Walton

12 December 2009 16	Birmingham City	1 – 0	West Ham United	St Andrew's
	Bowyer 52'	Report		Attendance: 28,203; Referee: Lee Mason

15 December 2009 17	Bolton Wanderers	3 – 1	West Ham United	Reebok Stadium
	Lee 64'; Klasnić 77'; Cahill 88'	Report	Diamanti 69'	Attendance: 17,849; Referee: Andre Marriner

20 December 2009 18	West Ham United	1 – 1	Chelsea	Boleyn Ground
	Diamanti 45' (pen.)	Report	Lampard 61' (pen.)	Attendance: 33,338; Referee: Mike Dean

26 December 2009 19	West Ham United	2 – 0	Portsmouth	Boleyn Ground
	Diamanti 23' (pen.); Kováč 89'	Report		Attendance: 33,686; Referee: Lee Probert

28 December 2009 20	Tottenham Hotspur	2 – 0	West Ham United	White Hart Lane
	Modrić 11'; Defoe 81'	Report		Attendance: 35,994; Referee: Chris Foy

17 January 2010 21	Aston Villa	0 – 0	West Ham United	Villa Park
		Report		Attendance: 35,646; Referee: Mike Jones

26 January 2010 22	Portsmouth	1 – 1	West Ham United	Fratton Park
	Webber 76'	Report	Upson 52'	Attendance: 18,322; Referee: Andre Marriner

30 January 2010 23	West Ham United	0 – 0	Blackburn Rovers	Boleyn Ground
		Report		Attendance: 33,093; Referee: Peter Walton

6 February 2010 24	Burnley	2 – 1	West Ham United	Turf Moor
	Nugent 14'; Fox 55'	Report	Ilan 81'	Attendance: 21,001; Referee: Howard Webb

10 February 2010 25	West Ham United	2 – 0	Birmingham City	Boleyn Ground
	Diamanti 45+2'; Cole 67'	Report		Attendance: 34,458; Referee: Mike Dean

20 February 2010 26	West Ham United	3 – 0	Hull City	Boleyn Ground
	Behrami 3'; Cole 59'; Faubert 90+3'	Report		Attendance: 33,971; Referee: Martin Atkinson

23 February 2010 27	Manchester United	3 – 0	West Ham United	Old Trafford
	Rooney 38', 55'; Owen 80'	Report		Attendance: 73,797; Referee: Alan Wiley

6 March 2010 28	West Ham United	1 – 2	Bolton Wanderers	Boleyn Ground
	Diamanti 88'	Report	K. Davies 10'; Wilshere 16'; Cohen (yellow card) 63' (yellow-red card) 71'	Attendance: 33,824; Referee: Lee Probert

13 March 2010 29	Chelsea	4 – 1	West Ham United	Stamford Bridge
	Alex 16'; Drogba 56', 90'; Malouda 77'	Report	Parker 30'	Attendance: 41,755; Referee: Mark Clattenburg

20 March 2010 30	Arsenal	2 – 0	West Ham United	Emirates Stadium
	Denílson 5'; Fàbregas 83' (pen.)	Report		Attendance: 60,077; Referee: Martin Atkinson

23 March 2010 31	West Ham United	1 – 3	Wolverhampton Wanderers	Boleyn Ground
	Franco 90+3'	Report	Doyle 28'; Zubar 58'; Jarvis 61'	Attendance: 33,988; Referee: Phil Dowd

27 March 2010 32	West Ham United	0 – 1	Stoke City	Boleyn Ground
		Report	Fuller 69'	Attendance: 34,564; Referee: Andre Marriner

4 April 2010 33	Everton	2 – 2	West Ham United	Goodison Park
	Bilyaletdinov 24'; Yakubu 85'	Report	Da Costa 60'; Ilan 87'	Attendance: 37,451; Referee: Howard Webb

10 April 2010 34	West Ham United	1 – 0	Sunderland	Boleyn Ground
	Ilan 51'	Report		Attendance: 34,685; Referee: Mike Jones

19 April 2010 35	Liverpool	3 – 0	West Ham United	Anfield
	Benayoun 19'; Ngog 29'; Green 59' (o.g.)	Report		Attendance: 37,697; Referee: Peter Walton

24 April 2010 36	West Ham United	3 – 2	Wigan Athletic	Boleyn Ground
	Ilan 31'; Kováč 45+5'; Parker 77'	Report	Spector 4' (o.g.); Rodallega 52'	Attendance: 33,057; Referee: Alan Wiley

2 May 2010 37	Fulham	3 – 2	West Ham United	Craven Cottage
	Dempsey 45+1'; Cole 58' (o.g.); Okaka 79'	Report	Cole 61'; Franco 90+2'	Attendance: 24,201; Referee: Andre Marriner

9 May 2010 38	West Ham United	1 – 1	Manchester City	Boleyn Ground
	Boa Morte 17'	Report	Wright-Phillips 21'	Attendance: 34,989; Referee: Howard Webb

=== League Cup ===
25 August 2009 Second round	West Ham United	3 – 1 (a.e.t.)	Millwall	Boleyn Ground
	Stanislas 87', 98' (pen.); Hines 100'	Report	Harris 26'	Attendance: 24,492; Referee: Paul Taylor

22 September 2009 Third round	Bolton Wanderers	3 – 1 (a.e.t.)	West Ham United	Reebok Stadium
	K. Davies 86'; Cahill 96'; Elmander 119'	Report	Ilunga 59'	Attendance: 8,050; Referee: Howard Webb

=== FA Cup ===
3 January 2010 Third round	West Ham United	1 – 2	Arsenal	Boleyn Ground
	Diamanti 45+1'	Report	Ramsey 78'; Eduardo 83'	Attendance: 25,549; Referee: Mark Clattenburg

== Statistics ==
=== Overview ===
Competition	Record							
Competition	P	W	D	L	GF	GA	GD	Win %
Premier League	38	8	11	19	47	66	−19	21.05
FA Cup	1	0	0	1	1	2	−1	0.00
League Cup	2	1	0	1	4	4	+0	50.00
Total	41	9	11	21	52	72	−20	21.95

=== Goalscorers ===
Rank	Pos	No.	Nat	Name	Premier League	FA Cup	League Cup	Total
1	ST	12	(England)	Carlton Cole	10	0	0	10
2	ST	32	(Italy)	Alessandro Diamanti	7	1	0	8
3	ST	10	(Mexico)	Guillermo Franco	5	0	0	5
3	MF	46	(England)	Junior Stanislas	3	0	2	5
5	ST	9	(Brazil)	Ilan	4	0	0	4
6	DF	15	(England)	Matthew Upson	3	0	0	3
7	MF	8	(England)	Scott Parker	2	0	0	2
7	MF	14	(Czech Republic)	Radoslav Kovac	2	0	0	2
7	MF	16	(England)	Mark Noble	2	0	0	2
7	DF	22	(Portugal)	Manuel da Costa	2	0	0	2
7	MF	31	(Wales)	Jack Collison	2	0	0	2
7	ST	41	(England)	Zavon Hines	1	0	1	2
13	DF	23	(Democratic Republic of the Congo)	Herita Ilunga	0	0	1	1
13	MF	13	(Portugal)	Luis Boa Morte	1	0	0	1
13	MF	20	(France)	Julien Faubert	1	0	0	1
13	MF	17	(Chile)	Luis Jiménez	1	0	0	1
13	MF	21	(Switzerland)	Valon Behrami	1	0	0	1
Totals					47	1	4	52

=== League position by matchday ===
Matchday	1	2	3	4	5	6	7	8	9	10	11	12	13	14	15	16	17	18	19	20	21	22	23	24	25	26	27	28	29	30	31	32	33	34	35	36	37	38
Ground	A	H	A	A	H	A	H	A	H	A	H	H	A	H	H	A	A	H	H	A	A	A	H	A	H	H	A	H	A	A	H	H	A	H	A	H	A	H
Result	W	L	D	L	L	L	D	L	D	D	W	L	D	W	L	L	L	D	W	L	D	D	D	L	W	W	L	L	L	L	L	L	D	W	L	W	L	D
Position	4	11	10	12	14	18	19	19	19	19	16	18	17	17	17	18	19	19	17	17	16	16	15	18	14	13	13	14	16	17	17	17	17	16	17	17	17	17

A = Away; H = Home; W = Win; D = Draw; L = Loss

=== Appearances and goals ===
No.	Pos	Nat	Player	Total		Premier League		FA Cup		League Cup	
No.	Pos	Nat	Player	Apps	Goals	Apps	Goals	Apps	Goals	Apps	Goals
Goalkeepers
1	GK	(England) ENG	Robert Green	41	0	38	0	1	0	2	0
28	GK	(Hungary) HUN	Péter Kurucz	1	0	0+1	0	0	0	0	0
Defenders
3	DF	(Democratic Republic of the Congo) COD	Herita Ilunga	17	1	16	0	0	0	1	1
4	DF	(Wales) WAL	Daniel Gabbidon	11	0	8+2	0	0	0	1	0
15	DF	(England) ENG	Matthew Upson	35	3	33	3	1	0	0+1	0
18	DF	(United States) USA	Jonathan Spector	29	0	22+5	0	0	0	2	0
19	DF	(Wales) WAL	James Collins	3	0	3	0	0	0	0	0
22	DF	(Portugal) POR	Manuel da Costa	16	2	12+3	2	0	0	1	0
30	DF	(England) ENG	James Tomkins	26	0	22+1	0	1	0	2	0
33	DF	(Switzerland) SUI	Fabio Daprela	8	0	4+3	0	1	0	0	0
44	DF	(England) ENG	Bondz N'Gala	1	0	0	0	0	0	0+1	0
45	DF	(England) ENG	Jordan Spence	1	0	0+1	0	0	0	0	0
Midfielders
7	MF	(England) ENG	Kieron Dyer	11	0	4+6	0	0	0	1	0
8	MF	(England) ENG	Scott Parker	33	2	30+1	2	0	0	2	0
13	MF	(Portugal) POR	Luis Boa Morte	1	1	1	1	0	0	0	0
14	MF	(Czech Republic) CZE	Radoslav Kovac	34	2	27+4	2	1	0	2	0
16	MF	(England) ENG	Mark Noble	28	2	25+2	2	0	0	1	0
17	MF	(Chile) CHI	Luis Jimenez	12	1	6+5	1	1	0	0	0
20	MF	(France) FRA	Julien Faubert	36	1	32+1	1	1	0	1+1	0
21	MF	(Switzerland) SUI	Valon Behrami	28	1	24+3	1	1	0	0	0
28	MF	(England) ENG	Kyel Reid	2	1	0	0	0	0	2	1
31	MF	(Wales) WAL	Jack Collison	23	2	19+3	2	0	0	1	0
35	MF	(England) ENG	Josh Payne	1	0	0	0	0	0	1	0
36	MF	(England) ENG	Anthony Edgar	1	0	0	0	0+1	0	0	0
46	MF	(England) ENG	Junior Stanislas	28	4	11+15	2	1	0	1	2
Forwards
9	FW	(Brazil) BRA	Ilan	11	4	6+5	4	0	0	0	0
10	FW	(Mexico) MEX	Guillermo Franco	23	5	16+7	5	0	0	0	0
11	FW	(Egypt) EGY	Mido	9	0	5+4	0	0	0	0	0
12	FW	(England) ENG	Carlton Cole	32	10	26+4	10	0	0	1+1	0
17	FW	(South Africa) RSA	Benni McCarthy	5	0	2+3	0	0	0	0	0
19	FW	(England) ENG	Freddie Sears	2	0	0+1	0	0+1	0	0	0
24	FW	(England) ENG	Frank Nouble	10	0	3+5	0	1	0	0+1	0
32	FW	(Italy) ITA	Alessandro Diamanti	29	8	18+9	7	1	1	1	0
41	FW	(England) ENG	Zavon Hines	15	2	5+8	1	0	0	1+1	1

== Transfers ==
=== In ===
#	Pos	Player	From	Fee	Date	Notes
17	FW	(Chile) Luis Jiménez	(Italy) Inter Milan	Loan	23 June 2009	
24	FW	(England) Frank Nouble	(England) Chelsea	Undisclosed	21 July 2009	
33	DF	(Switzerland) Fabio Daprelà	(Switzerland) Grasshoppers	Undisclosed	31 July 2009	
14	MF	(Czech Republic) Radoslav Kováč	(Russia) Spartak Moscow	Free	14 August 2009	
32	MF	(Italy) Alessandro Diamanti	(Italy) Livorno	Undisclosed	28 August 2009	
22	DF	(Portugal) Manuel da Costa	(Italy) Fiorentina	Trade for Savio	31 August 2009	
10	FW	(Mexico) Guillermo Franco	(Spain) Villarreal	Undisclosed	17 September 2009	
17	FW	(South Africa) Benni McCarthy	(England) Blackburn Rovers	Undisclosed	1 February 2010	
11	FW	(Egypt) Mido	(England) Middlesbrough	Loan	1 February 2010	
9	FW	(Brazil) Ilan	(France) Saint-Étienne	Free	1 February 2010	

=== Out ===
Pos	Player	To	Fee	Date	Notes
DF	(Australia) Lucas Neill	(England) Everton	Released	4 June 2009	
FW	(England) Freddie Sears	(England) Crystal Palace	Loan	26 June 2009	
MF	(England) Kyel Reid	(England) Sheffield United	Free	1 July 2009	
GK	(England) Jimmy Walker	(England) Tottenham Hotspur	Released	3 July 2009	
MF	(England) Lee Bowyer	(England) Birmingham City	Free	8 July 2009	
FW	(Germany) Savio Nsereko	(Italy) Fiorentina	Trade for da Costa	31 August 2009	
DF	(Wales) James Collins	(England) Aston Villa	Undisclosed	1 September 2009	
MF	(England) Anthony Edgar	(England) Bournemouth	Loan	1 October 2009	
DF	(Iceland) Hólmar Örn Eyjólfsson	(England) Cheltenham Town	Loan	1 October 2009	
DF	(England) Matt Fry	(England) Gillingham	Loan	15 October 2009	
MF	(England) Josh Payne	(England) Colchester United	Loan	22 October 2009	
MF	(Scotland) Nigel Quashie	(England) MK Dons	Loan	24 November 2009	
GK	(Czech Republic) Marek Štěch	(England) Bournemouth	Loan	11 December 2009	
FW	(England) Dean Ashton	Unattached	Retired	11 December 2009	
MF	(England) Josh Payne	(England) Wycombe Wanderers	Loan	22 January 2010	
MF	(Scotland) Nigel Quashie	(England) Queens Park Rangers	Free	22 January 2010	
FW	(England) Frank Nouble	(England) West Bromwich Albion	Loan	8 February 2010	
FW	(England) Freddie Sears	(England) Coventry City	Loan	12 February 2010	
DF	(England) Bondz N'Gala	(England) Plymouth Argyle	Loan	16 March 2010	
DF	(England) Calum Davenport	Unattached	Released	17 March 2010	
FW	(England) Frank Nouble	(England) Swindon Town	Loan	19 March 2010	
DF	(England) Matt Fry	(England) Charlton Athletic	Loan	25 March 2010	
