= Dean Ashton =

English footballer (born 1983)

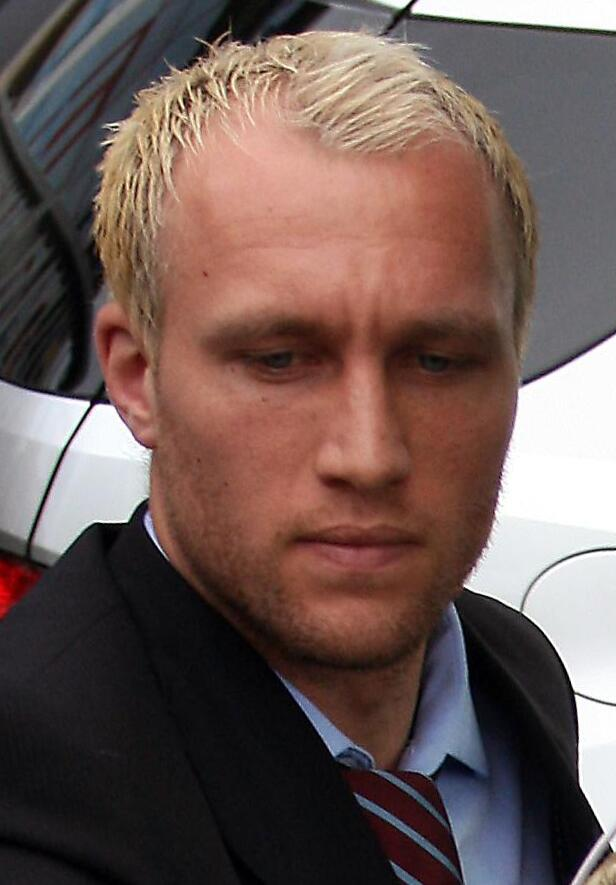
- Ashton in 2008

Personal information
- Full name: Dean Ashton
- Date of birth: 24 November 1983 (age 42)
- Place of birth: Swindon, England
- Height: 6 ft 1 in (1.85 m)
- Position: Striker

Youth career
- Stoke City
- –2005: Crewe Alexandra

Senior career*
| Years | Team | Apps | (Gls) |
| 2000–2005 | Crewe Alexandra | 158 | (61) |
| 2005–2006 | Norwich City | 44 | (17) |
| 2006–2009 | West Ham United | 46 | (15) |
| Total | | 248 | (93) |

International career
| 2001 | England U17 | 1 | (1) |
| 2001–2002 | England U19 | 5 | (5) |
| 2002 | England U20 | 2 | (0) |
| 2004–2005 | England U21 | 9 | (4) |
| 2008 | England | 1 | (0) |
- * Club domestic league appearances and goals

Dean Ashton (born 24 November 1983) is an English former professional footballer. He made over 240 appearances as a forward in the Football League and Premier League for Crewe Alexandra, Norwich City and West Ham United, and was capped by England. He was highly praised as a talented centre forward, but had a career frustrated by injury. He retired on 11 December 2009, aged 26, after failing to recover from a long-term ankle injury sustained during international duty with England.

== Club career ==
=== Crewe Alexandra ===
Born in Swindon, Wiltshire, and raised in Holmes Chapel, Cheshire, Ashton spent his youth career playing at Crewe Alexandra. He was a product of Crewe's renowned youth development policy under manager Dario Gradi. He signed scholarship forms as a 16-year-old in 2000 before making his first-team debut on 28 October as an 83rd-minute substitute in Crewe's 1–0 win at Gillingham and became one of the youngest players to represent the club. He waited three months for his second appearance, again as substitute, in a 3–1 victory over Grimsby Town, and his first goal for the Railwaymen was in their 4–2 victory against Burnley. His first start arrived in an FA Cup clash against Cardiff City in January 2001. He finished his first season at the club with eight goals, including crucial ones against Bolton Wanderers, Portsmouth, Gillingham and Wimbledon towards the end of the season as Crewe secured their First Division status.

His second season at the club was disrupted by injury and a temporary loss of form, but in spite of this he scored ten times and began to win international honours with England at under-16, under-17, under-18 and under-19 level. Ashton scored 16 more times in the 2002–03 season as the club bounced back to the First Division after just one season in the Second Division. Ashton had a number of notable displays for Crewe, one of which was in the 4–0 win against Luton Town, where he scored two goals and set up David Vaughan's goal. Crewe manager Dario Gradi said that "These have been his best performances and people are right to say he has a bright future in the game."

In the 2003–04 season, he scored 19 league goals in the First Division, including his first Football League hat-trick in a 3–2 win at the JJB Stadium against Wigan Athletic on 6 March 2004 – a match in which he converted two penalties. During the season, Ashton was reportedly linked to a number of clubs, Wolves were among the clubs interested in signing the striker at the time, however Dario Gradi regarded all the rumours as just speculation. Having previously played for England at Under-19 level, he stepped up to the under-21 team that season, scoring against the Netherlands and Sweden.

Ashton scored 20 times for Crewe in the 2004–05 season prior to becoming Norwich City's record signing at £3 million. (He was also the third Crewe striker to sign for Norwich, following Ashley Ward in 1994, and Mark Rivers in 2001).

=== Norwich City ===
Ashton joined Norwich City from Crewe Alexandra for a fee of £3 million in January 2005, breaking the club's transfer record previously held by the £1 million deal that brought Jon Newsome to Norwich City from Leeds United in 1994, although this record was later broken by the £3.5m transfer of Robert Earnshaw to Carrow Road from West Bromwich Albion. Additionally, Crewe inserted a 20% sell-on clause, meaning that the South Cheshire club would receive 20 per cent of any profit if Norwich sold the striker to another club.

He scored on his home debut for Norwich City against Middlesbrough in an exciting eight goal thriller, Norwich came back from 4–1 down to draw the match 4–4. In February, Ashton scored an impressive goal against Manchester City which later achieved second place in the BBC's Goal of the Month for February, Thierry Henry's goal against Crystal Palace won the award. Many of the pundits believed that Ashton would be the key to Norwich's survival. Ashton scored many important goals in Norwich's fight for survival, including the deciding goals against Newcastle and Birmingham. Norwich however, were relegated in 2005 and even with a host of Premier league clubs interested in him, Ashton decided to stay at the club in the next season in an attempt to win promotion back into the Premier League. Later that year Ashton scored his first and only hat trick for Norwich City against Southampton, in a 3–1 win at Carrow Road.

With Norwich out of the top flight there was much speculation surrounding Ashton's future at the club, with some people believing a player with his qualities merited a place in the Premier League. Many clubs, including Manchester City and Charlton Athletic, considered him; the Addicks manager, Alan Curbishley, was reportedly prepared to axe six of his players to buy the Norwich youngster. West Ham United were also among the clubs interested in buying the striker. Nigel Worthington attempted to quash these rumours, saying that Ashton would only be sold for a price which matched his value to the club. Wigan Athletic manager Paul Jewell was put off considering a move for Ashton because of this price. Dean Ashton re-stated his commitment to the club in the summer of 2005 by signing a contract-extension until 2009. By December, it looked likely that a Premiership club would bid for Ashton, as boss Nigel Worthington said that Ashton would be allowed to leave in January of that year – if the club are happy with the fee. Dean Ashton's future looked increasingly uncertain after missing the FA Cup match against West Ham through injury which meant Ashton was not cup-tied. After playing 46 matches for Norwich, in which he scored 18 goals, he was transferred to West Ham on 22 January 2006 for a fee of £7 million, rising to £7.25 million with two £125,000 bonuses dependent on a future England call-up and possible European qualification while Ashton is at West Ham. Norwich also negotiated a 15% sell-on clause.

=== West Ham United ===
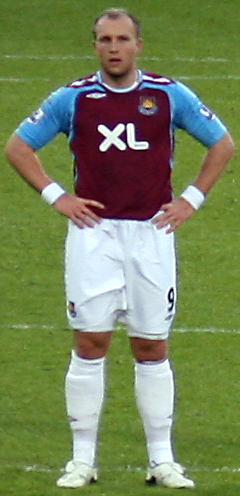
Ashton playing for West Ham United in 2007

Norwich accepted West Ham's bid after apparently having been in negotiations with them for a few weeks. On 22 January 2006, the day the transfer was announced, Ashton agreed personal terms with the club and underwent a medical later in the day. He was unveiled at a press conference prior to West Ham's match against Fulham on 23 January. Ashton said "The chance of a swift step up to the Premiership is too good to turn down. I'm really delighted to join a massive club like West Ham. When West Ham came along I jumped at the chance to be back and playing in the Premiership. My ambition has always been to be playing in the Premiership regularly and hopefully the club can make the best of my ability. I spoke to Norwich manager Nigel Worthington and the board and told them I wanted to pursue this opportunity. I'd like to thank Norwich for understanding that and allowing myself and my representative to talk to West Ham."

Ashton made an impressive start to his West Ham career, making his debut in the Hammers' 3–2 victory away to Arsenal, and scored some key goals in West Ham's following fixtures, including two goals in the FA Cup quarter-final against Manchester City, which was vital in continuing the team's inspiring FA Cup run in 2006. In West Ham's semi-final against Middlesbrough, Ashton broke Middlesbrough goalkeeper Mark Schwarzer's cheekbone. He caught Schwarzer with his elbow in an aerial challenge in the first half. This incident did not go well with the Middlesbrough fans, who booed Ashton for the remaining time he was on the field. Ashton however, made an apology to Schwarzer and to 'Boro fans and said that it was accidental and that no malice was intended.

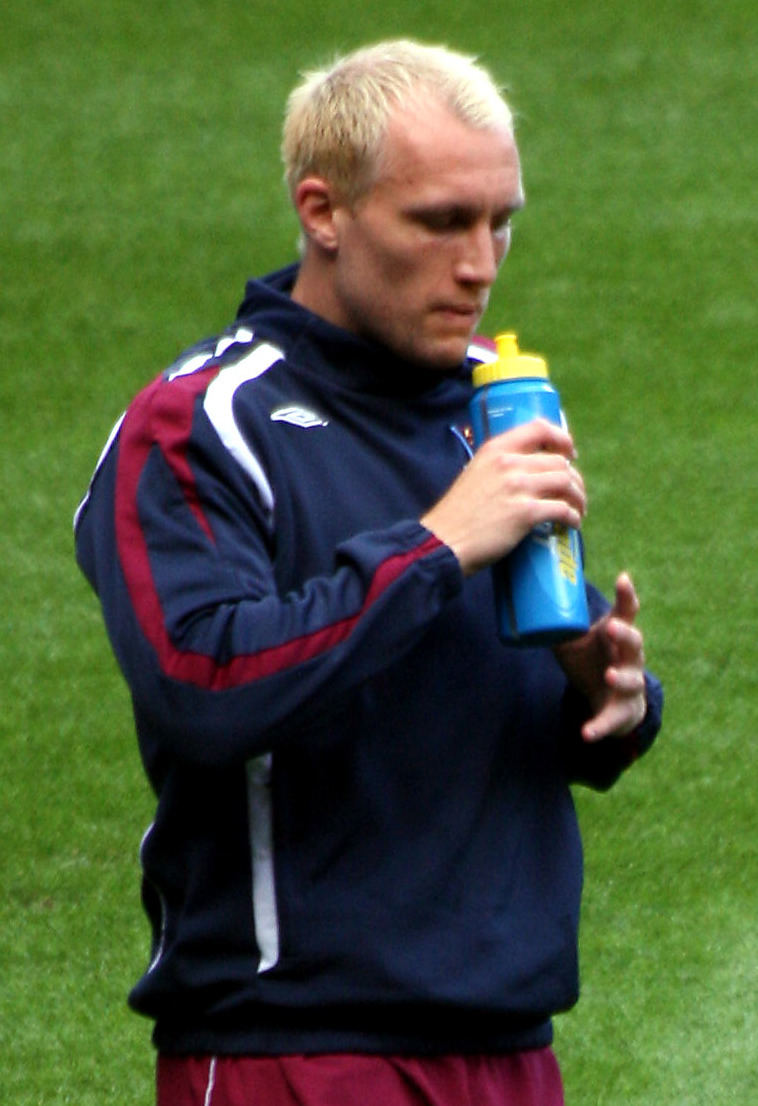
Ashton with West Ham United in 2008

To cap off a pivotal season in Ashton's career, he scored a goal and was a thorn in the usually solid Liverpool defence in the 2006 FA Cup Final, which eventually ended (after a 3–3 draw) in a 3–1 penalty shootout victory for the Merseysiders. Ashton had been a doubt in the build-up to the match after picking up a hamstring injury in the Premier League match versus West Bromwich Albion. However, despite not participating in any intensive training before the final, Ashton declared himself fit, and duly produced one of the most impressive displays in his short time at West Ham. Despite not managing to secure a place in Sven-Göran Eriksson's England squad for the 2006 World Cup, Ashton impressed sufficiently to draw praise from football pundit Alan Hansen. and then West Ham manager, Alan Pardew. He scored 6 goals in 16 appearances in his first half-season with the club. During the summer of 2006, Ashton was linked with moves away from Upton Park, one club that was mentioned the most was Newcastle United. However, Alan Pardew claimed Ashton would be "going nowhere".

Ashton suffered a broken ankle while on England duty in August 2006, which meant that he was forced eventually to miss the whole of the 2006–07 season. In his absence, West Ham were fighting relegation for virtually the whole season, which led to speculation that Ashton would leave if the club was relegated. Eggert Magnússon, the club's chairman, stated in March 2007 that Ashton would not be allowed to leave until the following January at the earliest if the club were to go down. In the event, the club avoided relegation on the final day of the 2006–07 season.

Ashton returned to the West Ham team on 14 July 2007 in a pre-season friendly against Dagenham & Redbridge where he played for 45 minutes. He admitted he had doubted whether he would ever return to top class football and was excitedly looking forward to next season, saying, "I don't think there will be a hungrier player in the Premier League this season than me". He scored his first goals for a year in the pre-season matches against Leyton Orient and Roma. He made his return to the Premier League on 11 August 2007 against Manchester City, coming on as a substitute for George McCartney in the 65th minute, and went on to make 35 league and cup appearances in the 2007–08 season, scoring 11 goals, most notably an overhead kick against Manchester United. Ashton signed a new five-year contract at West Ham in June 2008, keeping him at the club until 2013. Ashton started the 2008–09 Premiership campaign in blistering form, scoring both goals in the 2–1 home win against Wigan. However, he quickly found himself back on the Hammers' burgeoning injury list after spraining his ankle in manager Gianfranco Zola's first training session.

Ashton made no appearances in the 2009–10 season. On 11 December 2009, West Ham announced that Ashton had retired, aged 26, after failing to recover from a long-term ankle injury originally sustained during an international training session, in August 2006, following a tackle from Shaun Wright-Phillips. Ashton made 56 appearances in all competitions for West Ham, scoring 19 goals, but at his retirement had not played since appearing against West Bromwich Albion on 13 September 2008.

Upon hearing the announcement of the striker's retirement, Ashton's former manager at Crewe, Dario Gradi, told the press that he wanted Ashton in time to become part of the coaching team at Crewe.

In January 2011, West Ham, seeking compensation for Ashton, prepared a writ against The Football Association for £10.5m. In 2013, Ashton started his own claim for work injury compensation for loss of future earnings following his 2006 injury while playing for England.

== International career ==
Ashton progressed through the England youth set up, racking up an impressive goal-to-game ratio. In August 2006, Ashton was first called up to the England senior team for their friendly against Greece, part of new manager Steve McClaren's team. However, just a day before the match, the striker suffered a heavy tackle from Shaun Wright-Phillips which resulted in a broken ankle in training and missed out on a chance to make his England debut against Greece. He then later was ruled out for more than a year and missed the whole of the West Ham season. He was recalled to the England squad and was fit to face Estonia. However, a few days later, it was announced that he had been ruled out of action for up to six weeks with a sprained medial collateral ligament, forcing him to once again miss out on making his international debut for a second time. In May 2008, Ashton was named in McClaren's successor, Fabio Capello's, squad for the USA and Trinidad and Tobago friendlies.

He finally made his debut, more than two years after his first call up, in the match against Trinidad & Tobago on 1 June 2008.

== After football ==
After retiring from football, Ashton worked as a commentator for televised football matches. On 28 March 2016, he played in Mark Noble's testimonial at Upton Park, scoring with an overhead kick.

Ashton can often be heard as a co-commentator on Talksport.

== Career statistics ==
=== Club ===
Appearances and goals by club, season and competition
| Club | Season | League | | | FA Cup | | League Cup | | Other | | Total | |
| Club | Season | Division | Apps | Goals | Apps | Goals | Apps | Goals | Apps | Goals | Apps | Goals |
|---|---|---|---|---|---|---|---|---|---|---|---|---|
| Crewe Alexandra | 2000–01 | First Division | 21 | 8 | 2 | 0 | 0 | 0 | — | | 23 | 8 |
| Crewe Alexandra | 2001–02 | First Division | 31 | 7 | 4 | 3 | 1 | 0 | — | | 36 | 10 |
| Crewe Alexandra | 2002–03 | Second Division | 38 | 9 | 2 | 2 | 1 | 0 | 3 (Note: Appearances in Football League Trophy) | 5 | 44 | 16 |
| Crewe Alexandra | 2003–04 | First Division | 44 | 19 | 1 | 0 | 2 | 1 | — | | 47 | 20 |
| Crewe Alexandra | 2004–05 | Championship | 24 | 18 | 0 | 0 | 3 | 2 | — | | 27 | 20 |
| Crewe Alexandra | Total | | 158 | 61 | 9 | 5 | 7 | 3 | 3 | 5 | 177 | 74 |
| Norwich City | 2004–05 | Premier League | 16 | 7 | — | | — | | — | | 16 | 7 |
| Norwich City | 2005–06 | Championship | 28 | 10 | 0 | 0 | 2 | 1 | — | | 30 | 11 |
| Norwich City | Total | | 44 | 17 | 0 | 0 | 2 | 1 | — | | 46 | 18 |
| West Ham United | 2005–06 | Premier League | 11 | 3 | 5 | 3 | — | | — | | 16 | 6 |
| West Ham United | 2006–07 | Premier League | 0 | 0 | 0 | 0 | 0 | 0 | 0 | 0 | 0 | 0 |
| West Ham United | 2007–08 | Premier League | 31 | 10 | 2 | 0 | 2 | 1 | — | | 35 | 11 |
| West Ham United | 2008–09 | Premier League | 4 | 2 | 0 | 0 | 1 | 0 | — | | 5 | 2 |
| West Ham United | 2009–10 | Premier League | 0 | 0 | 0 | 0 | 0 | 0 | — | | 0 | 0 |
| West Ham United | Total | | 46 | 15 | 7 | 3 | 3 | 1 | 0 | 0 | 56 | 19 |
| Career total | | | 248 | 93 | 16 | 8 | 12 | 5 | 3 | 5 | 279 | 111 |

=== International ===
Appearances and goals by national team and year
| National team | Year | Apps | Goals |
|---|---|---|---|
| England | 2008 | 1 | 0 |
| Total | | 1 | 0 |

== Honours ==
Crewe Alexandra

- Football League Second Division runner-up: 2002–03

West Ham United

- FA Cup runner-up: 2005–06
