= 2007–08 West Ham United F.C. season =

English football team season

West Ham United
2007–08 season
- Chairman: Björgólfur Guðmundsson
- Manager: Alan Curbishley
- Premier League: 10th
- FA Cup: Third round
- League Cup: Fifth round
- Top goalscorer: League: Dean Ashton (10); All: Dean Ashton (12)
- Average home league attendance: 33,898
Home colours	Away colours

The 2007–08 season saw West Ham United compete in the Premier League, where the club finished in 10th place.

== Final league table ==
Pos	Team	Pld	W	D	L	GF	GA	GD	Pts	Qualification or relegation
8	Portsmouth	38	16	9	13	48	40	+8	57	Qualification for the UEFA Cup first round (Note: As FA Cup winners)
9	Manchester City	38	15	10	13	45	53	−8	55	Qualification for the UEFA Cup first qualifying round (Note: Manchester City qualified as the highest-ranked team not already qualified for European competitions of Premier League Fair Play Ranking by The Football Association, the top association among UEFA Fair Play ranking winners.)
10	West Ham United	38	13	10	15	42	50	−8	49	
11	Tottenham Hotspur	38	11	13	14	66	61	+5	46	Qualification for the UEFA Cup first round (Note: As League Cup winners)
12	Newcastle United	38	11	10	17	45	65	−20	43	

Source: Barclays Premier League
Rules for classification: 1) points; 2) goal difference; 3) number of goals scored.
For further information on European qualification see Premier League – Competition

== Squad ==
Note: Flags indicate national team as defined under FIFA eligibility rules; some limited exceptions apply. Players may hold more than one non-FIFA nationality.

No.	Pos.	Nation	Player
1	GK	ENG	Robert Green
2	DF	AUS	Lucas Neill (captain)
3	DF	NIR	George McCartney
4	DF	WAL	Danny Gabbidon
5	DF	ENG	Anton Ferdinand
6	DF	ENG	Matthew Upson
7	MF	SWE	Freddie Ljungberg
8	MF	ENG	Scott Parker
9	FW	ENG	Dean Ashton
10	FW	WAL	Craig Bellamy
11	MF	ENG	Matthew Etherington
12	FW	ENG	Carlton Cole
14	DF	GHA	John Paintsil
15	MF	PER	Nolberto Solano
16	MF	ENG	Mark Noble
17	MF	ENG	Hayden Mullins
18	DF	USA	Jonathan Spector
19	DF	WAL	James Collins

No.	Pos.	Nation	Player
20	MF	FRA	Julien Faubert
21	GK	ENG	Richard Wright
22	MF	ENG	Tony Stokes
23	GK	ENG	Jimmy Walker
25	FW	ENG	Bobby Zamora
26	MF	SCO	Nigel Quashie
27	DF	ENG	Calum Davenport
28	MF	ENG	Kyel Reid
29	MF	ENG	Lee Bowyer
30	DF	ENG	James Tomkins
32	MF	ENG	Kieron Dyer
33	GK	CZE	Marek Štěch
34	MF	POR	Luís Boa Morte
37	FW	SEN	Henri Camara (on loan from Wigan Athletic)
39	MF	WAL	Jack Collison
40	FW	ENG	Freddie Sears
45	DF	ENG	Jordan Spence

=== Left club during season ===
Note: Flags indicate national team as defined under FIFA eligibility rules; some limited exceptions apply. Players may hold more than one non-FIFA nationality.

No. / Pos. / Nation / Player; 24 / DF / SCO / Christian Dailly (to Rangers)	No. / Pos. / Nation / Player; 31 / MF / ENG / Hogan Ephraim (to Queens Park Rangers)

== Transfers ==
=== In ===
Date	Position	Name	From	Fee
6 June 2007	MF	(England) Scott Parker	Newcastle United	£7,000,000
1 July 2007	MF	(France) Julien Faubert	Bordeaux	£6,100,000
4 July 2007	GK	(England) Richard Wright	Everton	Free
10 July 2007	MF	(Wales) Craig Bellamy	Liverpool	£7,500,000
23 July 2007	MF	(Sweden) Freddie Ljungberg	Arsenal	£3,000,000
16 August 2007	MF	(England) Kieron Dyer	Newcastle United	£6,000,000
31 August 2007	MF	(Peru) Nolberto Solano	Newcastle United	Undisclosed

=== Out ===
Date	Position	Name	To	Fee
4 July 2007	FW	(England) Teddy Sheringham	Colchester United	Free
5 July 2007	MF	(England) Nigel Reo-Coker	Aston Villa	£8,500,000
6 July 2007	MF	(England) Shaun Newton	Leicester City	Free
7 July 2007	GK	(Northern Ireland) Roy Carroll	Rangers	Free
12 July 2007	MF	(Israel) Yossi Benayoun	Liverpool	£5,000,000
13 July 2007	DF	(England) Paul Konchesky	Fulham	Undisclosed
17 July 2007	FW	(England) Marlon Harewood	Aston Villa	Undisclosed
3 August 2007	FW	(Argentina) Carlos Tevez	Media Sport Investment	Settlement (Note: This was an agreement to allow Tevez to move to Manchester United on a two-year loan)
2 January 2008	MF	(England) Hogan Ephraim	Queens Park Rangers	Undisclosed
31 January 2008	DF	(Scotland) Christian Dailly	Rangers	Free

=== Loans In ===
Date	Position	Name	From	Length
31 August 2007	FW	(Senegal) Henri Camara	Wigan Athletic	Full Season

=== Loans Out ===
Date	Position	Name	To	Length
10 August 2007	MF	(England) Hogan Ephraim	Queens Park Rangers	One Month (extended in September)
22 November 2007	MF	(England) Tony Stokes	Stevenage	Two Months
18 January 2008	DF	(England) Calum Davenport	Watford	One Month (recalled 21 January)
27 March 2008	MF	(England) Kyel Reid	Crystal Palace	Until end of season

== Results ==
=== Premier League ===
11 August 2007 1	West Ham United	0–2	Manchester City	London
		Report	Bianchi 18'; Geovanni 87'	Stadium: Boleyn Ground; Attendance: 34,921; Referee: Peter Walton

18 August 2007 2	Birmingham City	0–1	West Ham United	Birmingham
		Report	Noble 70'	Stadium: ST Andrew's; Attendance: 24,961; Referee: Mark Halsey

25 August 2007 3	West Ham United	1–1	Wigan Athletic	London
	Bowyer 81'	Report	Scharner 78'	Stadium: Boleyn Ground; Attendance: 33,793; Referee: Andre Marriner

1 September 2007 4	Reading	0–3	West Ham United	Reading
		Report	Bellamy 6'; Etherington 49', 90'	Stadium: Madejski Stadium; Attendance: 23,533; Referee: Howard Webb

15 September 2007 5	West Ham United	3–0	Middlesbrough	London
	Bowyer 46'; Young 51' (o.g.); Ashton 62'	Report		Stadium: Boleyn Ground; Attendance: 34,351; Referee: Steve Bennett

23 September 2007 6	Newcastle United	3–1	West Ham United	Newcastle upon Tyne
	Viduka 2', 41'; N'Zogbia 76'	Report	Ashton 32'	Stadium: St. James' Park; Attendance: 50,104; Referee: Mike Riley

29 September 2007 7	West Ham United	0–1	Arsenal	London
		Report	van Persie 13'	Stadium: Boleyn Ground; Attendance: 34,966; Referee: Alan Wiley

6 October 2007 8	Aston Villa	1–0	West Ham United	Birmingham
	Gardner 24'	Report		Stadium: Villa Park; Attendance: 40,842; Referee: Steve Tanner

21 October 2007 9	West Ham United	3–1	Sunderland	London
	Cole 9'; Gordon 78' (o.g.); Bellamy 90'	Report	Jones 52'	Stadium: Boleyn Ground; Attendance: 34,913; Referee: Chris Foy

27 October 2007 10	Portsmouth	0–0	West Ham United	Portsmouth
		Report		Stadium: Fratton Park; Attendance: 20,525; Referee: Mike Dean

4 November 2007 11	West Ham United	1–1	Bolton Wanderers	London
	McCartney 20'	Report	Nolan 90'	Stadium: Boleyn Ground; Attendance: 33,867; Referee: Peter Walton

10 November 2007 12	Derby County	0–5	West Ham United	Derby
		Report	Bowyer 42', 59'; Etherington 51'; Lewis 55' (o.g.); Solano 69'	Stadium: Pride Park; Attendance: 32,440; Referee: Mark Clattenburg

25 November 2007 13	West Ham United	1–1	Tottenham Hotspur	London
	Cole 20'	Report	Dawson 67'	Stadium: Boleyn Ground; Attendance: 34,966; Referee: Mike Riley

1 December 2007 14	Chelsea	1–0	West Ham United	London
	J. Cole 76'	Report		Stadium: Stamford Bridge; Attendance: 41,830; Referee: Howard Webb

9 December 2007 15	Blackburn Rovers	0–1	West Ham United	Blackburn
		Report	Ashton 52'	Stadium: Ewood Park; Attendance: 20,870; Referee: Alan Wiley

15 December 2007 16	West Ham United	0–2	Everton	London
		Report	Yakubu 45'; Johnson 90'	Stadium: Boleyn Ground; Attendance: 34,430; Referee: Steve Tanner

22 December 2007 17	Middlesbrough	1–2	West Ham United	Middlesbrough
	Wheater 40'	Report	Ashton 44'; Parker 90'	Stadium: Riverside Stadium; Attendance: 26,007; Referee: Martin Atkinson

26 December 2007 18	West Ham United	1–1	Reading	London
	Solano 42'	Report	Kitson 60'	Stadium: Boleyn Ground; Attendance: 34,277; Referee: Peter Walton

29 December 2007 19	West Ham United	2–1	Manchester United	London
	Ferdinand 77'; Upson 82'	Report	Ronaldo 14'	Stadium: Boleyn Ground; Attendance: 34,966; Referee: Mike Dean

1 January 2008 20	Arsenal	2–0	West Ham United	London
	Eduardo 2'; Adebayor 18'	Report		Stadium: Emirates Stadium; Attendance: 60,102; Referee: Chris Foy

12 January 2008 21	West Ham United	2–1	Fulham	London
	Ashton 28'; Ferdinand 69'	Report	Davies 8'	Stadium: Boleyn Ground; Attendance: 34,947; Referee: Mike Riley

20 January 2008 22	Manchester City	1–1	West Ham United	Manchester
	Vassell 16'	Report	Cole 8'	Stadium: City of Manchester Stadium; Attendance: 39,042; Referee: Phil Dowd

30 January 2008 23	West Ham United	1–0	Liverpool	London
	Noble 90'	Report		Stadium: Boleyn Ground; Attendance: 34,977; Referee: Alan Wiley

2 February 2008 24	Wigan Athletic	1–0	West Ham United	Wigan
	Kilbane 45'	Report		Stadium: JJB Stadium; Attendance: 20,525; Referee: Martin Atkinson

9 February 2008 25	West Ham United	1–1	Birmingham City	London
	Ljungberg 7'	Report	McFadden 16'	Stadium: Boleyn Ground; Attendance: 34,884; Referee: Mark Clattenburg

23 February 2008 26	Fulham	0–1	West Ham United	London
		Report	Solano 87'	Stadium: Craven Cottage; Attendance: 25,280; Referee: Howard Webb

1 March 2008 27	West Ham United	0–4	Chelsea	London
		Report	Lampard 17'; J. Cole 20'; Ballack 22'; A. Cole 64'	Stadium: Boleyn Ground; Attendance: 34,969; Referee: Peter Walton

5 March 2008 28	Liverpool	4–0	West Ham United	Liverpool
	Torres 8', 61', 81'; Gerrard 83'	Report		Stadium: Anfield; Attendance: 42,954; Referee: Steve Bennett

9 March 2008 29	Tottenham Hotspur	4–0	West Ham United	London
	Berbatov 8', 11'; Gilberto 85'; Bent 90'	Report		Stadium: White Hart Lane; Attendance: 36,062; Referee: Chris Foy

15 March 2008 30	West Ham United	2–1	Blackburn Rovers	London
	Ashton 39'; Sears 81'	Report	Santa Cruz 19'	Stadium: Boleyn Ground; Attendance: 34,006; Referee: Martin Atkinson

22 March 2008 31	Everton	1–1	West Ham United	Liverpool
	Yakubu 8'	Report	Ashton 68'	Stadium: Goodison Park; Attendance: 37,430; Referee: Mark Halsey

29 March 2008 32	Sunderland	2–1	West Ham United	Sunderland
	Jones 29'; Reid 90'	Report	Ljungberg 18'	Stadium: Stadium of Light; Attendance: 45,690; Referee: Andre Marriner

8 April 2008 33	West Ham United	0–1	Portsmouth	London
		Report	Kranjcar 61'	Stadium: Boleyn Ground; Attendance: 33,629; Referee: Lee Probert

12 April 2008 34	Bolton Wanderers	1–0	West Ham United	Bolton
	Davies 47'	Report		Stadium: Reebok Stadium; Attendance: 23,043; Referee: Rob Styles

19 April 2008 35	West Ham United	2–1	Derby County	London
	Zamora 20'; Cole 77'	Report	Mears 65'	Stadium: Boleyn Ground; Attendance: 34,612; Referee: Steve Tanner

26 April 2008 36	West Ham United	2–2	Newcastle United	London
	Noble 10'; Ashton 23'	Report	Martins 43'; McCartney 45' (o.g.)	Stadium: Boleyn Ground; Attendance: 34,980; Referee: Uriah Rennie

3 May 2008 37	Manchester United	4–1	West Ham United	Manchester
	Ronaldo 3', 24'; Tevez 26'; Carrick 59'	Report	Ashton 28'	Stadium: Old Trafford; Attendance: 76,013; Referee: Mike Riley

11 May 2008 38	West Ham United	2–2	Aston Villa	London
	Solano 8'; Ashton 88'	Report	Young 14'; Barry 58'	Stadium: Boleyn Ground; Attendance: 34,969; Referee: Mike Dean

=== League Cup ===
28 August 2007 Second round	Bristol Rovers	1–2	West Ham United	Bristol
	Williams 72'	Report	Bellamy 31', 45'	Stadium: Memorial Stadium; Attendance: 10,831; Referee: Michael Jones

26 September 2007 Third round	West Ham United	1–0	Plymouth Argyle	London
	Ashton 90'	Report		Stadium: Boleyn Ground; Attendance: 25,774; Referee: Phil Dowd

30 October 2007 Fourth round	Coventry City	1–2	West Ham United	Coventry
	Tabb 68'	Report	Hall 71' (o.g.); Cole 90'	Stadium: Ricoh Arena; Attendance: 23,968; Referee: Rob Styles

12 December 2007 Quarter Final	West Ham United	1–2	Everton	London
	Cole 12'	Report	Osman 40'; Yakubu 88'	Stadium: Boleyn Ground; Attendance: 28,777; Referee: Mark Halsey

=== FA Cup ===
5 January 2008 Third round	West Ham United	0–0	Manchester City	London
		Report		Stadium: Boleyn Ground; Attendance: 33,806; Referee: Rob Styles

16 January 2008 Third round replay	Manchester City	1–0	West Ham United	Manchester
	Elano 73'	Report		Stadium: City of Manchester Stadium; Attendance: 27,809; Referee: Mark Clattenburg

== Statistics ==
=== Overview ===
Competition	Record							
Competition	P	W	D	L	GF	GA	GD	Win %
Premier League	38	13	10	15	42	50	−8	34.21
FA Cup	2	0	1	1	0	1	−1	0.00
League Cup	4	3	0	1	6	4	+2	75.00
Total	44	16	11	17	48	55	−7	36.36

=== Goalscorers ===
Rank	Pos	No.	Nat	Name	Premier League	FA Cup	League Cup	Total
1	ST	9	(England)	Dean Ashton	10	0	1	11
2	ST	12	(England)	Carlton Cole	4	0	2	6
3	ST	10	(Wales)	Craig Bellamy	2	0	2	4
3	MF	15	(Peru)	Nolberto Solano	4	0	0	4
3	MF	29	(England)	Lee Bowyer	4	0	0	4
3	Own goals				3	0	1	4
7	MF	11	(England)	Matthew Etherington	3	0	0	3
7	MF	16	(England)	Mark Noble	3	0	0	3
9	DF	5	(England)	Anton Ferdinand	2	0	0	2
9	MF	7	(Sweden)	Freddie Ljungberg	2	0	0	2
11	DF	3	(Northern Ireland)	George McCartney	1	0	0	1
11	DF	6	(England)	Matthew Upson	1	0	0	1
11	MF	8	(England)	Scott Parker	1	0	0	1
11	ST	25	(England)	Bobby Zamora	1	0	0	1
11	ST	40	(England)	Freddie Sears	1	0	0	1
Totals					42	0	6	48

=== League position by matchday ===
Matchday	1	2	3	4	5	6	7	8	9	10	11	12	13	14	15	16	17	18	19	20	21	22	23	24	25	26	27	28	29	30	31	32	33	34	35	36	37	38
Ground	H	A	H	A	H	A	H	A	H	A	H	A	H	A	A	H	A	H	H	A	H	A	H	A	H	A	H	A	A	H	A	A	H	A	H	H	A	H
Result	L	W	D	W	W	L	L	L	W	D	D	W	D	L	W	L	W	D	W	L	W	D	W	L	D	W	L	L	L	W	D	L	L	L	W	D	L	D
Position	20	15	12	8	5	7	10	11	10	9	11	9	10	10	10	11	10	9	9	10	10	10	10	10	10	9	10	10	10	10	10	10	10	10	10	10	10	10

A = Away; H = Home; W = Win; D = Draw; L = Loss

=== Appearances and goals ===
No.	Pos	Nat	Player	Total		Premier League		FA Cup		League Cup	
No.	Pos	Nat	Player	Apps	Goals	Apps	Goals	Apps	Goals	Apps	Goals
Goalkeepers
1	GK	(England) ENG	Robert Green	41	0	38	0	2	0	1	0
21	GK	(England) ENG	Richard Wright	3	0	0	0	0	0	3	0
Defenders
2	DF	(Australia) AUS	Lucas Neill	40	0	34	0	2	0	4	0
3	DF	(Northern Ireland) NIR	George McCartney	44	1	38	1	2	0	4	0
4	DF	(Wales) WAL	Daniel Gabbidon	14	0	8+2	0	0	0	3+1	0
5	DF	(England) ENG	Anton Ferdinand	29	2	22+3	2	2	0	2	0
6	DF	(England) ENG	Matthew Upson	33	1	29	1	2	0	2	0
14	DF	(Ghana) GHA	John Paintsil	17	0	4+10	0	1	0	0+2	0
18	DF	(United States) USA	Jonathan Spector	28	0	13+13	0	0+1	0	0+1	0
19	DF	(Wales) WAL	James Collins	5	0	2+1	0	0	0	1+1	0
30	DF	(England) ENG	James Tomkins	6	0	5+1	0	0	0	0	0
Midfielders
7	MF	(Sweden) SWE	Freddie Ljungberg	28	2	22+3	2	1	0	2	0
8	MF	(England) ENG	Scott Parker	20	1	17+1	1	0	0	2	0
11	MF	(England) ENG	Matthew Etherington	21	3	15+3	3	2	0	1	0
15	MF	(Peru) PER	Nolberto Solano	23	4	14+9	4	0	0	0	0
16	MF	(England) ENG	Mark Noble	36	3	25+6	3	2	0	1+2	0
17	MF	(England) ENG	Hayden Mullins	39	0	32+2	0	1	0	4	0
20	MF	(France) FRA	Julien Faubert	8	0	4+3	0	0+1	0	0	0
28	MF	(England) ENG	Kyel Reid	4	0	0+1	0	0+1	0	0+2	0
29	MF	(England) ENG	Lee Bowyer	20	4	12+3	4	1+1	0	2+1	0
32	MF	(England) ENG	Kieron Dyer	3	0	2	0	0	0	1	0
34	MF	(Portugal) POR	Luis Boa Morte	32	0	18+9	0	1	0	4	0
39	MF	(Wales) WAL	Jack Collison	2	0	1+1	0	0	0	0	0
Forwards
9	FW	(England) ENG	Dean Ashton	34	11	20+11	10	2	0	1	1
10	FW	(Wales) WAL	Craig Bellamy	9	4	7+1	2	0	0	1	2
12	FW	(England) ENG	Carlton Cole	37	6	21+10	4	1+1	0	3+1	2
25	FW	(England) ENG	Bobby Zamora	14	1	11+2	1	0	0	1	0
37	FW	(Senegal) SEN	Henri Camara	10	0	3+7	0	0	0	0	0
40	FW	(England) ENG	Freddie Sears	7	1	1+6	1	0	0	0	0
