= Péter Kurucz =

Hungarian footballer

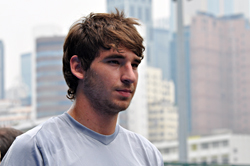

Personal information
- Date of birth: 30 May 1988 (age 38)
- Place of birth: Budapest, Hungary
- Height: 1.85 m (6 ft 1 in)
- Position: Goalkeeper

Youth career
- Újpest

Senior career*
Years	Team	Apps	(Gls)
2008–2009	Újpest	0	(0)
2008	→ Tatabánya (loan)	9	(0)
2009	→ West Ham United (loan)	0	(0)
2009–2012	West Ham United	1	(0)
2012	→ Rochdale (loan)	11	(0)
2012–2013	Siófok	25	(0)
2013–2015	Ferencváros	0	(0)
2014–2015	→ Soroksár (loan)	0	(0)
Total		46	(0)

International career
2007–2010	Hungary U-21	11	(0)
- * Club domestic league appearances and goals

Péter Kurucz (born 30 May 1988) is a retired Hungarian footballer who played as a goalkeeper.

== Club career ==
Kurucz began his career as a youth team player for Újpest. In February 2008, he played on loan for Tatabánya, making two appearances, before returning to Újpest and signing a contract with them.

On 9 February 2009, he completed a season long loan move with a purchase option to West Ham United. Kurucz made his competitive debut for West Ham in the 2–0 Premier Reserve League South defeat to Aston Villa on 17 March 2009. Kurucz made 5 reserve-team appearances for West Ham in the 2008/09 season.

On 3 June 2009, it was announced that Kurucz had signed a four-year contract with West Ham for an undisclosed fee.

On 5 December 2009, he made his first competitive appearance for West Ham, coming on as a substitute for Robert Green at Upton Park in a 4–0 defeat to Manchester United, although he did not concede any of the goals. In August 2010, during a friendly at Burton Albion, Kurucz picked up an anterior cruciate injury that ruled him out for the 2010–11 season.

In January 2012 Kurucz signed on loan for Rochdale. In May 2012 his contract with West Ham was terminated by mutual consent. He joined Crystal Palace on trial and played in the second half in a preseason friendly match against Lewes conceding once, and the full 90 minutes away at Dulwich Hamlet a few days later, keeping a clean sheet and saving a well struck penalty.

== International career ==
Kurucz was a member of the under-21 national team at international level with Hungary.
