= Ilan (footballer) =

Brazilian footballer (born 1980)

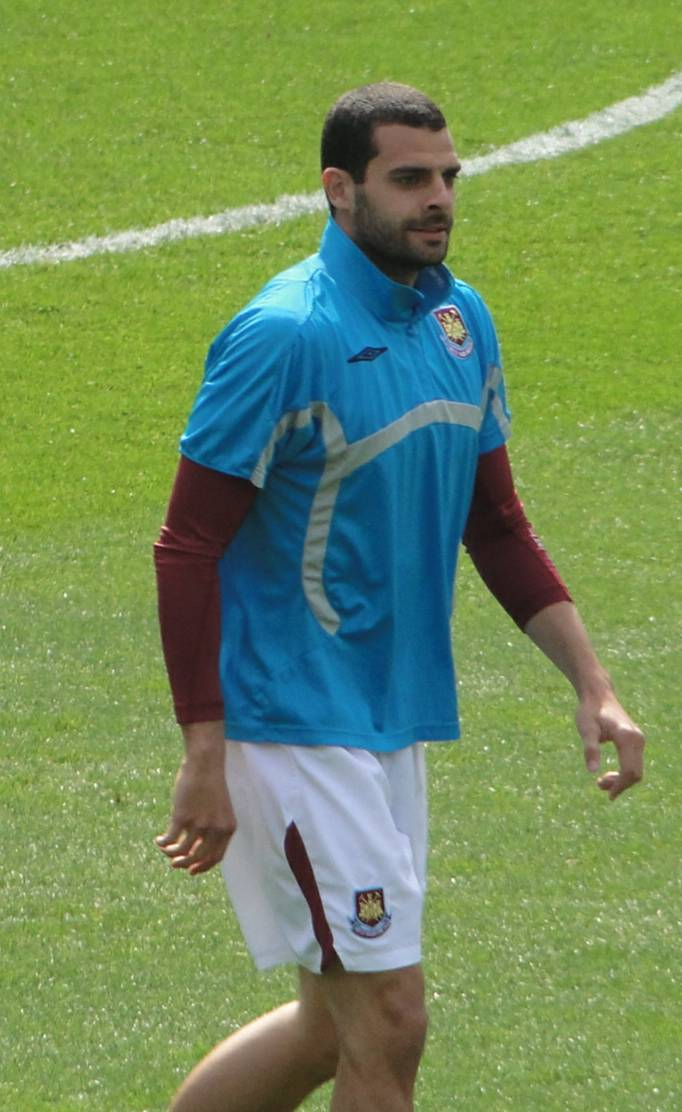
- Ilan at West Ham in 2010

Personal information
- Full name: Ilan Araújo Dall'Igna
- Date of birth: 18 September 1980 (age 46)
- Place of birth: Curitiba, Brazil
- Height: 1.81 m (5 ft 11 in)
- Position: Striker

Senior career*
Years	Team	Apps	(Gls)
1999–2000	Paraná	12	(2)
2001	São Paulo	12	(1)
2001–2004	Atlético Paranaense	64	(22)
2004–2006	Sochaux	54	(22)
2006–2010	Saint-Étienne	107	(26)
2010	West Ham United	11	(4)
2010	Internacional	4	(0)
2011–2012	Ajaccio	26	(6)
2012–2014	Bastia	52	(4)
Total		332	(87)

International career
2003	Brazil	3	(0)
- * Club domestic league appearances and goals

Ilan Araújo Dall'Igna (born 18 September 1980), commonly known as Ilan, is a Brazilian former professional footballer who played as a striker. He also holds an Italian passport.

== Club career ==
=== Paraná Clube ===
Born in Curitiba, Ilan was initially scouted and signed by Paraná Clube, and subsequently made his full-professional debut in a Campeonato Paranaense game in the 1999 season.

He remained at the club during the 2000 season, and was instrumental in helping the team to place fifth in the Copa João Havelange — which put Paraná back amongst the elites of Brazilian football.

=== São Paulo ===
In 2001, Ilan moved to São Paulo, where he was part of the squad who won the Torneio Rio-São Paulo. However, he found himself restricted to very few appearances at São Paulo and was transferred to Atlético Paranaense.

=== Atlético Paranaense ===
Although Ilan was mainly used as a substitute, his impact was pivotal during the final of the Brazilian Championship, in which he started the match in place of fellow striker Kléber Boas. In the first leg of the final against São Caetano he scored Atlético Paranaense's first goal in their 4–2 victory. His contribution was a key part of Atlético Paranaense winning their first Campeonato Brasileiro Série A.

In 2002, he suffered a serious injury which left him on the sidelines for the remainder of the season.

He returned to full fitness ready for the 2003 season and quickly made up for his absence by becoming a regular goalscorer for the club.

In 2004, he continued to score many goals for Atlético, even though he was often playing as a lone striker. Due to the arrival of Washington and the increasing interest from Sochaux, he was sold in the summer for worth 3 million.

=== Sochaux ===
Ilan adapted well to the French league and scored 13 goals for Sochaux in his debut season in which he became a key player and a fan favourite. On 21 August 2004, he made his debut for the club in a 2–1 loss against Auxerre. On 16 October 2004, Ilan scored his first goal before scoring a hat-trick in a 3–0 win over Stade Rennais. He followed up with goals in the next three matches against Toulouse, Caen and Monaco. Following a long wait he returned to scoring form with a brace in a 2–2 draw against Nantes on 19 December 2004. On 16 March 2005, he scored another brace in a 2–1 win over Metz. He continued a further three goals against Bastia, Toulouse and Caen. In the UEFA Cup campaign, Ilan scored one goal in the first leg and scored a brace in the second leg as Sochaux clearly beat Norwegian side Stabæk by a 9–0 aggregate score in the first round. In the first game of the group stage, he scored a brace in a 2–0 win over Dinamo Tbilisi.

Ilan continued to impress during the 2005–06 season, netting another ten goals in the league. He scored his first two goals of the season in a 2–1 win over Nice and throughout the season, he scored against Le Mans, Monaco (twice in two matches of the season), Lens, Saint-Étienne (his future club), Nancy and Stade Rennais. His performances for Sochaux had not gone unnoticed and in the summer of 2006 he was bought by Saint-Étienne for a transfer fee of €6 million.

=== Saint-Étienne ===
Ilan initially flourished at his new club, and forged a formidable partnership with French striker Bafétimbi Gomis and Czech striker Marek Heinz. In the second half in the 2006–07 season, he scored an overhead kick in a 2–0 victory over Paris Saint-Germain which later earned him the Trophées UNFP du football Goal of the Year award. In his first season, he scored nine goals in Ligue 1 while the club did not meet the fans' expectations reaching only 11th place in the league. He scored against Nancy (twice in two matches of the season along with Lens and PSG), Auxerre and a brace each against Lille and Valenciennes. Also in a match against Lens, Ilan scored an own goal.

In his second season, Ilan scored only six goals in 31 matches. He netted against Strasbourg, twice against Caen, Sochaux and Auxerre.

In the 2008–09 season, he was Saint-Étienne's top scorer in the UEFA Cup where the club played after 27 years of absence from international football. He scored the winning goal in their second-leg win against Olympiacos which put them through to the final 16 to face eventual runners up Werder Bremen. In the league, he reached 9 goals.

In his fourth and last season, Ilan only played 12 times scoring twice after falling out of favour within the Saint-Étienne ranks. In January 2010 Ilan and the club mutually agreed to cancel his contract, which was due to end the following summer, leaving him free to find a new club.

=== West Ham United ===
On 1 February 2010, West Ham United confirmed the signing of Brazilian forward Ilan on a six-month contract. He was available on a free transfer after leaving French club AS Saint-Étienne in January. He made his debut for West Ham on 6 February in a 2–1 away defeat to Burnley. Having replaced Mark Noble in the 77th minute, he scored three minutes later.

In March 2010 the press speculated that Ilan had openly criticised manager Gianfranco Zola; a claim later refuted by the player and the club.

After nine games without scoring for West Ham United, Ilan scored his second goal in the 87th minute against Everton to make it 2–2 on 4 April 2010. The following week, he scored the only goal in the game in a 1–0 win over Sunderland. After the impressive performances against Everton and Sunderland, he hoped to win a long-term deal at Upton Park. 14 days later, he scored the opener after 31 minutes in a 3–2 win over Wigan on 24 April 2010.

On 2 June 2010, West Ham announced that they would be releasing Ilan (along with Mido) as they were surplus to requirements.

=== Internacional ===
After being released by West Ham United, Ilan had been linked to the Hammers league rivals Bolton Wanderers and Scottish runners-up Celtic as well as clubs in Turkey and Greece. On 24 August 2010, Sport Club Internacional announced that Ilan would be undergoing a medical and physical exams before signing a 1.5-year contract. His move to Internacional ended his six-year stay in Europe.

On 22 September 2010, Ilan made his debut for Internacional in a 1–0 loss against Atlético Paranaense. After making just four appearances for the club, he was released at the end of the Série A campaign. Before his release, he would have participated in the FIFA Club World Cup but had to do surgery because of an injury.

=== Ajaccio ===
A free agent after his release from Internacional, Ilan returned to the Ligue 1 on 28 July 2011 signing for league newcomers Ajaccio on a one-year deal with an option for a further season. On 6 August 2011, he made his debut for Ajaccio in a 2–0 loss against Toulouse and scored his first goal on 27 August 2011 in a 4–1 loss against Auxerre. He added another goal the following week against Valenciennes in a 3–1 win. On 25 September 2011, he suffered an injury during a match against Brest in a 1–1 draw stating he was "suffering from slight pain" but added that the injury was "nothing too serious". The injury caused him to miss three games before he made his return in a 3–0 loss against Marseille on 22 October 2011. Later on the season, Ilan would later score against Caen (2–2 draw on 19 November 2011), Lille (3–2 loss on 3 December 2011), Lorient (1–1 draw on 24 March 2012) and Rennes (3–1 loss on 29 April 2012). The club ended the season in 16th place, staying in Ligue 1 for another season, with Ilan becoming the top-scorer for the club with six goals.

=== Bastia ===
On 12 July 2012, Ilan signed for Ajaccio's Corsica rivals Bastia, who had been newly promoted to Ligue 1.

== International career ==
Ilan made his international debut for Brazil on 19 June 2003 against Cameroon in the 2003 Confederations Cup. Two further appearances followed in the same competition. He earned a call-up from Carlos Alberto Parreira to the Brazil National Team in 2003 but did not make Parreira's final squad of 22 for the 2004 Copa América 2004.

== Personal life ==
Ilan was born in Brazil but holds an Italian passport because of his father Italian descent and his mother is Brazilian with Spanish ancestry. Ilan is the son of William Dall'Igna, former professional football player and former coach of Paraná Clube. His father was responsible for introducing Ilan to football and was also his agent.

== Career statistics ==
=== Club ===
Appearances and goals by club, season and competition
Club	Season	League			Cup (Note: Includes Coupe de France, Coupe de la Ligue.)		Continental (Note: Includes and UEFA Cup/Europa League.)		Total	
Club	Season	Division	Apps	Goals	Apps	Goals	Apps	Goals	Apps	Goals
Paraná	1999		12	2	0	0	—		12	2
São Paulo	2000		12	1	0	0	—		12	1
Atlético Paranaense	2001		15	3	0	0	—		15	3
Atlético Paranaense	2002		1	0	0	0	—		1	0
Atlético Paranaense	2003		30	16	0	0	—		30	16
Atlético Paranaense	2004		18	3	0	0	—		18	3
Atlético Paranaense	Total		64	22	0	0	0	0	64	22
Sochaux	2004–05	Ligue 1	27	12	2	1	6	4	35	17
Sochaux	2005–06	Ligue 1	27	10	3	0	—		30	10
Sochaux	Total		54	22	5	1	6	4	65	27
Saint-Étienne	2006–07	Ligue 1	33	9	1	0	—		34	9
Saint-Étienne	2007–08	Ligue 1	31	6	2	0	—		33	6
Saint-Étienne	2008–09	Ligue 1	31	9	1	0	6	5	38	14
Saint-Étienne	2009–10	Ligue 1	12	2	0	0	—		12	2
Saint-Étienne	Total		107	26	4	0	6	5	117	31
West Ham United	2009–10	Premier League	11	4	—		—		11	4
Internacional	2010	Série A	4	0	0	0	—		4	0
Ajaccio	2011–12	Ligue 1	26	6	1	0	—		27	6
Bastia	2012–13	Ligue 1	22	3	2	0	—		24	3
Bastia	2013–14	Ligue 1	30	1	3	2	—		33	3
Bastia	Total		52	4	5	2	0	0	57	6
Career total			332	87	14	3	12	9	358	99
