= James Collins (footballer, born 1983) =

Welsh footballer

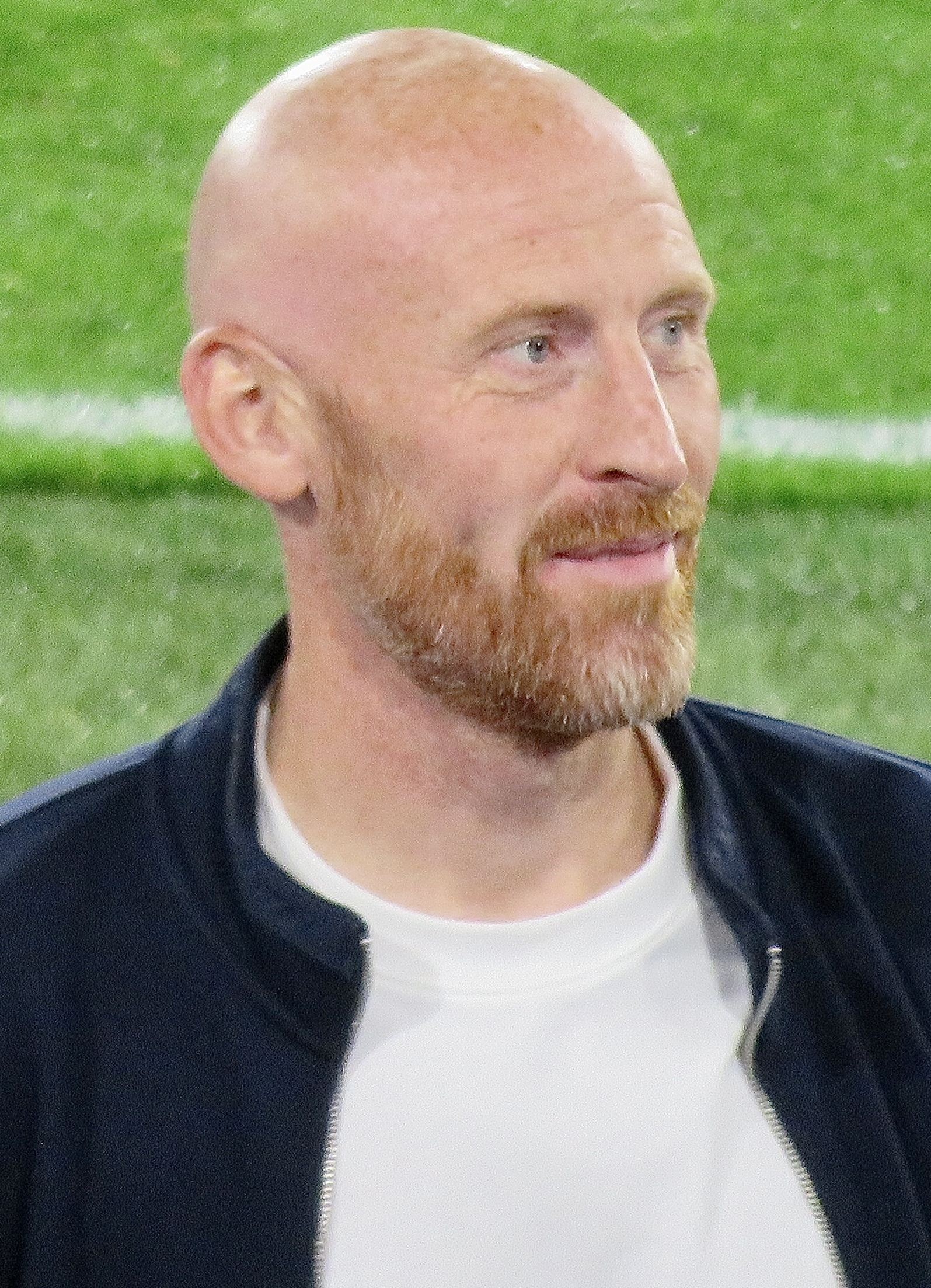
- Collins in 2023

Personal information
- Full name: James Michael Collins
- Date of birth: 23 August 1983 (age 43)
- Place of birth: Newport, Wales
- Height: 6 ft 2 in (1.88 m)
- Position: Centre back

Youth career
- 1998–2000: Cardiff City

Senior career*
Years	Team	Apps	(Gls)
2000–2005	Cardiff City	76	(4)
2005–2009	West Ham United	65	(2)
2009–2012	Aston Villa	108	(6)
2012–2018	West Ham United	149	(7)
2019	Ipswich Town	6	(0)
Total		404	(19)

International career
2001	Wales U19	3	(0)
2002	Wales U20	2	(0)
2002–2004	Wales U21	8	(0)
2004–2016	Wales	51	(3)
Medal record
Men's football
Representing Wales
UEFA European Championship
Bronze medal – third place	2016 France
- * Club domestic league appearances and goals

James Michael Collins (born 23 August 1983) is a Welsh former professional footballer who played as a defender.

He started his career with Cardiff City, progressing through the club's youth system before making his senior debut in 2000. He also played for two periods with West Ham.

At international level, Collins represented the Wales national football team, making his debut in 2004. He went on to win 51 caps before announcing his international retirement in 2017. Collins was included in the Great Britain Olympic football team shortlist for the London 2012 Olympics, but he did not make the final 18.

Collins announced his retirement from football in October 2020.

== Early life ==
Collins was born in Newport and attended St Joseph's Roman Catholic High School as a teenager. He was a schoolmate of Newport County player and manager Michael Flynn, who is two years older than Collins.

== Club career ==
=== Cardiff City ===
As a youngster, Collins played in the youth teams of local sides Shaftesbury and Pill before joining Cardiff City at the age of 15. He signed as a trainee in August 2000, after playing local football in his native city of Newport. He was one of two first-year apprentices offered a professional contract for the 2000–01 season along with Martyn Giles. He made his debut for Cardiff at the age of 17 in an FA Cup match against Bristol Rovers on 19 November 2000, which Cardiff won 5–1, as a substitute in place of Robert Earnshaw. However, a broken toe suffered soon after limited his appearances during his season.

In his early years with the club, Collins played as both a defender and a striker with manager Lennie Lawrence stating that "it wasn't clear whether James was a centre-half or a centre-forward" when he was appointed manager. Collins' broke into the first-team playing as a forward, scoring in his first start for the club during a 1–1 draw with Colchester United in November 2001. Lawrence and his coaching staff would settle on playing Collins as a defender and he went on to make 86 appearances in all competitions for Cardiff, scoring six goals. He won the Welsh Young Player of the Year award in 2005.

=== West Ham United ===
Collins joined West Ham United in July 2005, along with his centre-back partner at Cardiff, Danny Gabbidon, in a £3.5 million deal for the pair as Cardiff attempted to cut their wage bill and raise money. West Ham had previously seen a £350,000 bid for Collins rejected. Cardiff chairman Sam Hammam later stated that club could have received a better price for Collins from other clubs but West Ham were the only team to place a bid for Gabbidon and would only complete the transfer if it included both players.

Due to fitness problems as well as competition from more experienced players, Collins did not make his West Ham debut until the League Cup tie against Sheffield Wednesday on 20 September 2005, which West Ham won 4–2. He made his Premiership debut on 29 October 2005 in a 2–0 away defeat by Liverpool. He scored his first goal for West Ham in a 1–1 draw with Portsmouth on Boxing Day 2005. Collins ended his first Hammers season with two league goals, after scoring again in a 4–1 defeat against Chelsea at Stamford Bridge in April 2006.

Due to injuries to new signing Matthew Upson and 2005–06 Hammer of the Year Danny Gabbidon, Collins was given the chance to form a centre-back partnership with Anton Ferdinand towards the end of the 2006–07 season.

On 28 January 2008, it was announced that Collins would be out for a year after suffering severe ligament damage in a West Ham reserve game against Portsmouth. His injury kept him out for nine months and on 26 October 2008, Collins returned to first team action, starting in West Ham's 2–0 loss to Arsenal at Upton Park.

=== Aston Villa ===
Collins signed a four-year contract with Aston Villa for an undisclosed fee on 1 September 2009, the last day of the transfer window. On his league debut for Villa, on 13 September, he helped them keep a clean sheet in the Second City Derby against Birmingham City. His first goal for the club was the winner against Chelsea in a 2–1 victory, in which he was named Man of the Match. Collins played the full ninety minutes of the League Cup Final at Wembley on 28 February 2010, which saw Aston Villa beaten 1–2 by Manchester United. Collins also played the full game when Villa returned to Wembley on 10 April 2010, in a 0–3 defeat to Chelsea in the FA Cup semi-final. In March 2011, manager Gérard Houllier fined Collins and fellow centre-back Richard Dunne two weeks' wages after what was reported as "a boozy row with club staff during a team-bonding exercise".

=== Return to West Ham United ===
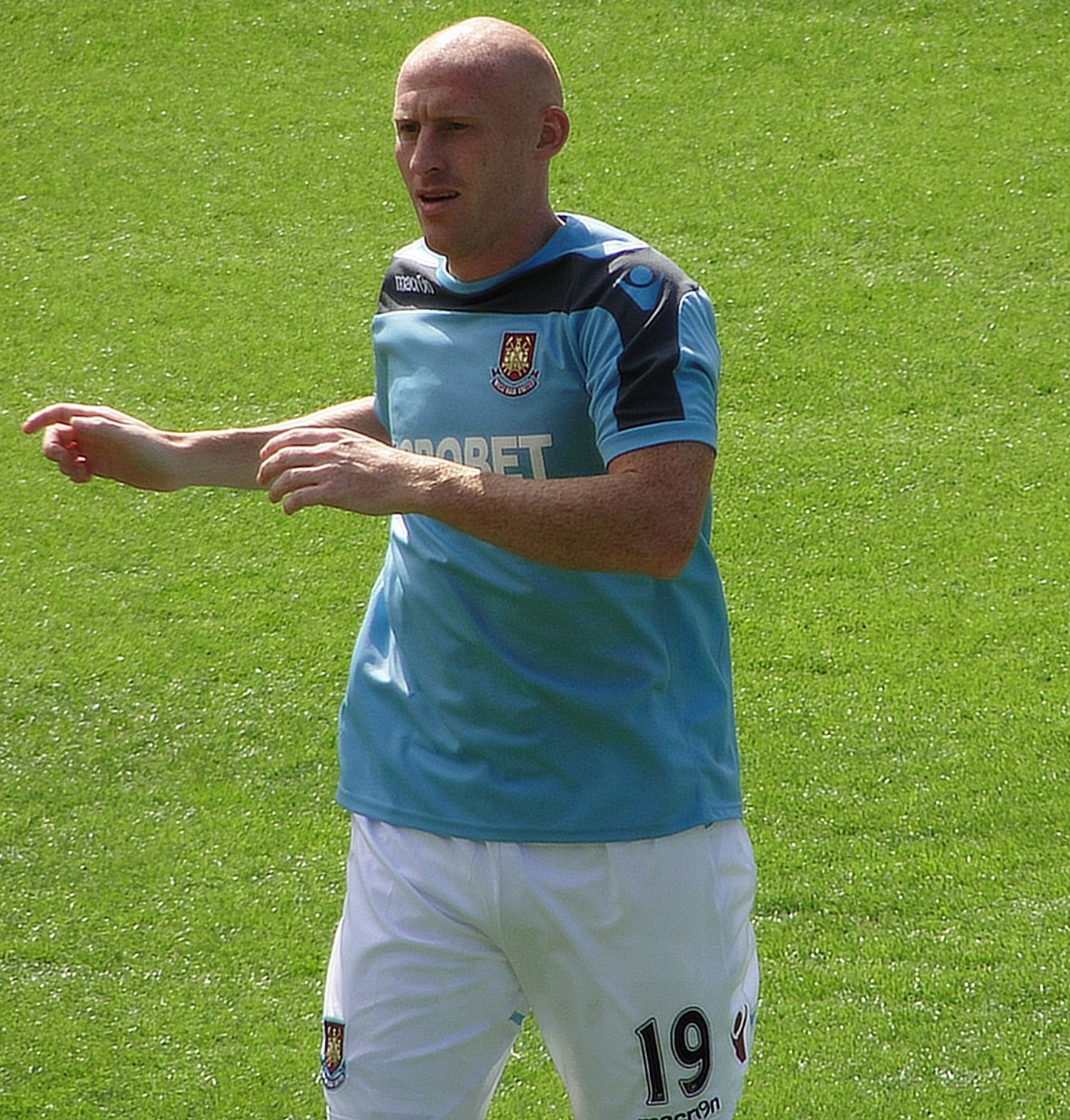
Collins warming up for West Ham United in 2012

On 1 August 2012, Collins signed for West Ham United for an undisclosed fee on a four-year contract. He was allocated the number 19 shirt, which he wore in his first spell with the club. On 18 August 2012, Collins started alongside Winston Reid in a 1–0 home win against his former club, Aston Villa on the opening day of the 2012–13 Premier League season. He was also awarded 'Man of the Match' for his performance on his second 'debut'. Collins first goals in his second spell with West Ham came on 5 January in an FA Cup third round tie against Manchester United. The game finished 2–2 with Collins scoring two headed goals from crosses by Joe Cole. Collins signed a two-year extension to his contract on 24 December 2015, which could keep him at the club until 2018. On 15 August 2016, Collins scored West Ham's first Premier League goal of the season, in a 2–1 defeat against London rivals, Chelsea.

Following the end of the 2017–18 season, it was announced that Collins' contract would not be renewed and that he would leave the club on 30 June. Collins subsequently posted an Instagram message in which he said he was "heartbroken" by the situation. Collins' final appearance of his 214 games in all competitions for West Ham came in a 3–1 win against Everton on 13 May 2018, being handed the captain's armband by Mark Noble following his introduction as a late substitution.

=== Ipswich Town ===
Collins had been training at Aston Villa following his release from West Ham United and impressed manager Dean Smith, being offered a five-week contract in December. However, he injured his calf in his first training session after signing the short-term deal, potentially ruling him out for its duration, leading Collins to cancel the contract.

On 11 January 2019, Collins joined Ipswich Town, signing a contract until the end of the season. He made his debut in a 1–0 home win against Rotherham United on 12 January. He was released at the end of the 2018–19 season after making just 6 appearances for the club.

Collins retired from football in October 2020.

== International career ==
=== Wales ===
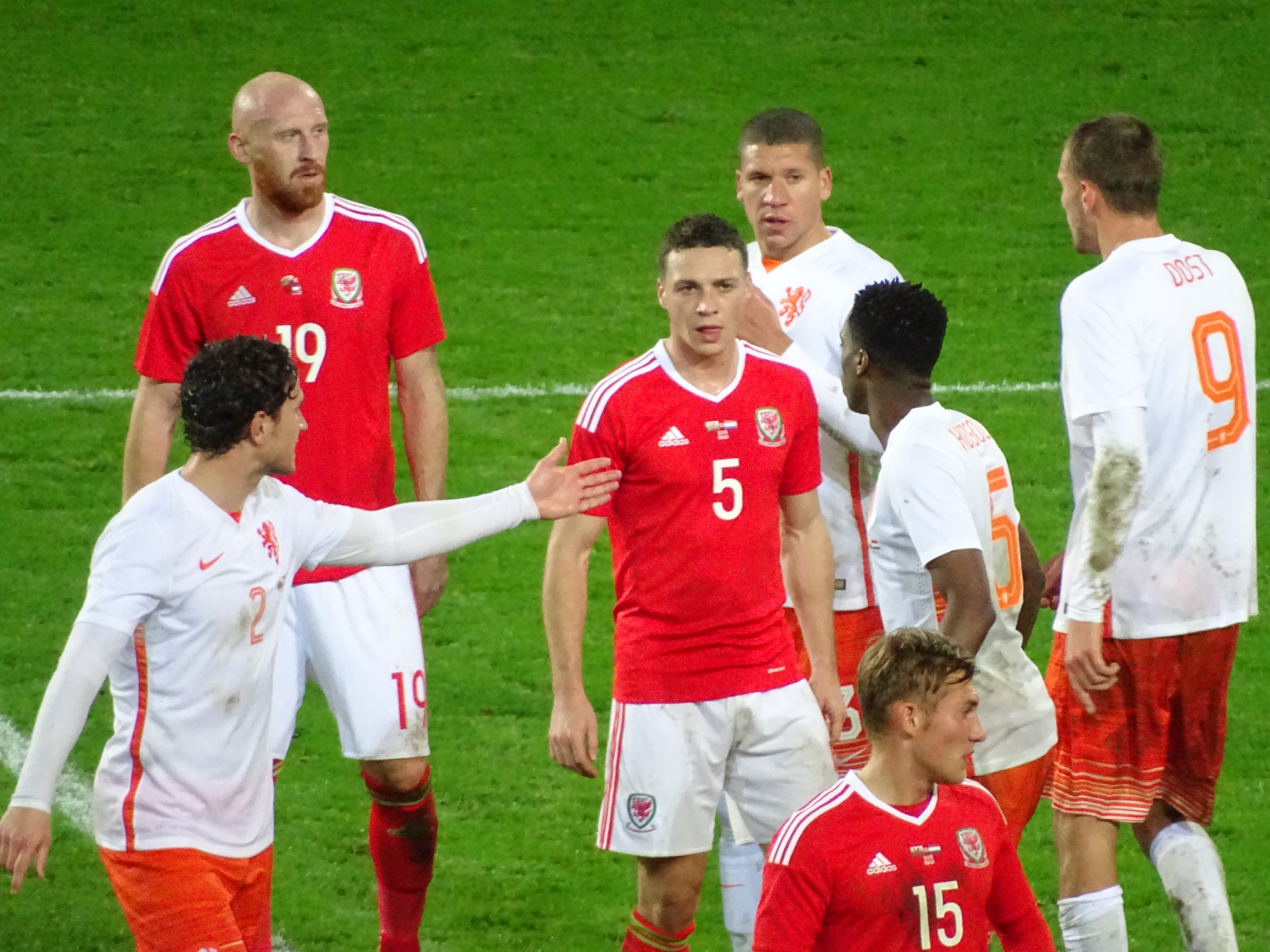
Collins (upper left) facing the Netherlands in 2015

Collins played for the Wales under-21 team on several occasions and captained them in a match against Germany U21.

In 2004, Collins accomplished what no other player did; his debut in the Wales team against Norway had him play at every level of football in Wales from youth to senior teams. He scored his debut goal for Wales in a 3–1 defeat to Cyprus on 13 October 2007. Ever present during 2010 World Cup qualifying, he captained Wales in the last qualifier against Liechtenstein and helped keep a clean sheet in a 2–0 win.

Collins was given his debut captain's armband for a friendly against Sweden on 3 March 2010. On 7 September 2012, in a 2014 World Cup qualifying game against Belgium, he was given a straight red card for a two-footed lunge on Guillaume Gillet, Wales went on to lose the match 2–0. Collins was included in the Wales 23-man squad for Euro 2016. Having made 51 appearances for Wales, Collins announced his international retirement in November 2017.

=== Great Britain ===
Coach Stuart Pearce had Collins included in the Team GB Olympic football provisional 191-man long-list of players for the 2012 London Olympics football tournament. He did not make the final 18-man cut.

== Other ventures ==
=== Boxing ===
On 27 September 2026, Misfits Boxing announced that Collins would be stepping in as a replacement opponent for influencer Big Stacks on the Joey Essex vs. Dapper Laughs undercard. The bout is scheduled to take place on 10 October at the Copper Box Arena in London.

== Personal life ==
Collins is a redhead and is nicknamed "Ginge" and "Ginger Pelé".

== Career statistics ==
=== Club ===
Appearances and goals by club, season and competition
Club	Season	League			FA Cup		League Cup		Europe		Other		Total	
Club	Season	Division	Apps	Goals	Apps	Goals	Apps	Goals	Apps	Goals	Apps	Goals	Apps	Goals
Cardiff City	2000–01	Third Division	3	0	2	0	0	0	—		1 (Note: Appearance(s) in Football League Trophy)	0	6	0
Cardiff City	2001–02	Second Division	7	1	2	0	0	0	—		3 (Note: Two appearances in Football League Trophy, one appearance in Second Division play-offs)	0	12	1
Cardiff City	2002–03	Second Division	2	0	3	2	0	0	—		2	0	7	2
Cardiff City	2003–04	First Division	20	1	0	0	1	0	—		—		21	1
Cardiff City	2004–05	Championship	34	1	2	1	4	0	—		—		40	2
Cardiff City	Total		66	3	9	3	5	0	—		6	0	86	6
West Ham United	2005–06	Premier League	14	2	3	0	2	0	—		—		19	2
West Ham United	2006–07	Premier League	16	0	0	0	0	0	1 (Note: Appearance in UEFA Cup)	0	—		17	0
West Ham United	2007–08	Premier League	3	0	0	0	2	0	—		—		5	0
West Ham United	2008–09	Premier League	18	0	3	0	0	0	—		—		21	0
West Ham United	2009–10	Premier League	3	0	0	0	0	0	—		—		3	0
West Ham United	Total		54	2	6	0	4	0	1	0	—		65	2
Aston Villa	2009–10	Premier League	27	1	5	1	5	0	0	0	—		37	2
Aston Villa	2010–11	Premier League	32	3	2	0	2	0	1 (Note: Appearance(s) in UEFA Europa League)	0	—		37	3
Aston Villa	2011–12	Premier League	32	1	1	0	1	0	—		—		34	1
Aston Villa	Total		91	5	8	1	8	0	1	0	—		108	6
West Ham United	2012–13	Premier League	29	0	1	2	0	0	—		—		30	2
West Ham United	2013–14	Premier League	24	1	0	0	2	0	—		—		26	1
West Ham United	2014–15	Premier League	27	0	2	1	0	0	—		—		29	1
West Ham United	2015–16	Premier League	19	0	3	0	1	0	2	0	—		25	0
West Ham United	2016–17	Premier League	22	2	0	0	0	0	2	0	—		24	2
West Ham United	2017–18	Premier League	13	1	0	0	2	0	—		—		15	1
West Ham United	Total		134	4	6	3	5	0	4	0	—		149	7
West Ham United U23	2017–18	—			—		—		—		1 (Note: Appearance in EFL Trophy)	0	1	0
Ipswich Town	2018–19	Championship	6	0	0	0	0	0	—		—		6	0
Career total			351	14	29	7	22	0	6	0	7	0	415	21

=== International ===
As of match played 5 September 2016

Appearances and goals by national team and year
National team	Year	Apps	Goals
Wales	2004	5	0
Wales	2005	5	0
Wales	2006	5	0
Wales	2007	9	1
Wales	2008	3	0
Wales	2009	6	1
Wales	2010	4	0
Wales	2011	3	0
Wales	2012	1	0
Wales	2013	3	0
Wales	2014	1	1
Wales	2015	2	0
Wales	2016	4	0
Total		51	3

=== International goals ===
Wales score listed first, score column indicates score after each Collins goal.

International goals by date, venue, cap, opponent, score, result and competition
No.	Date	Venue	Cap	Opponent	Score	Result	Competition
1	13 October 2007	GSP Stadium, Nicosia, Cyprus	22	Cyprus	1–0	1–3	UEFA Euro 2008 qualification
2	9 September 2009	Millennium Stadium, Cardiff, Wales	31	Russia	1–1	1–3	2010 FIFA World Cup qualification
3	5 March 2014	Cardiff City Stadium, Cardiff, Wales	45	Iceland	1–0	3–1	Friendly

== MF–Professional boxing record ==
1 fight	0 wins	1 loss
By decision	0	1

No.	Result	Record	Opponent	Type	Round, time	Date	Location	Notes
1	Loss	0–1	Big Stacks	SD	4	10 Oct 2026	Copper Box Arena, London, England	Two minute rounds.

== Honours ==
Cardiff City

- FAW Premier Cup: 2001–02

West Ham United

- FA Cup runner-up: 2005–06

Aston Villa

- Football League Cup runner-up: 2009–10
