= 2005–06 West Ham United F.C. season =

English football team season

West Ham United
2005–06 season
- Chairman: Terry Brown
- Manager: Alan Pardew
- Stadium: Boleyn Ground
- Premier League: 9th
- FA Cup: Runners-up
- League Cup: Third round
- Top goalscorer: League: Marlon Harewood (14); All: Marlon Harewood (16)
- Average home league attendance: 33,743

During the 2005–06 season, West Ham United competed in the FA Premier League, following promotion from the Football League Championship the previous season.

== Season summary ==
West Ham had barely scraped into the top six of the Championship the previous season before gaining promotion via the play-offs, so few gave the Hammers much hope of Premiership survival. However, West Ham surprised their naysayers to stand fourth at the end of October after 11 points from their opening six games. A run of mediocre form saw West Ham fall to tenth, before a run of five straight wins between January and February, including a 3–2 win at Arsenal, which saw the Hammers become the last side to beat Arsenal at Highbury, saw them rise to sixth. Alan Pardew won the Manager of the Month award for February. Several more good results, including a 2–1 home win over Tottenham Hotspur on the last day of the season that denied the North London side Champions League qualification, saw West Ham finish in ninth, above Everton, Middlesbrough and Manchester City.

West Ham's best form came in the FA Cup, where they overcame Blackburn Rovers, Bolton Wanderers and Middlesbrough to reach the FA Cup final – their first since 1980 – against a Liverpool side that were the reigning European champions and finished third in the Premiership. In spite of the odds, West Ham took a 2–0 lead within the first half-hour and also led 3–2 before a Steven Gerrard equalised at the end of normal time. Extra time proved goalless and a penalty shoot-out was required. Liverpool goalkeeper Pepe Reina, who had made several errors in the match, saved from Bobby Zamora, Paul Konchesky and Anton Ferdinand to give Liverpool a 3–1 win. However, as Liverpool had already qualified for the Champions League, West Ham qualified for the UEFA Cup.

== Final league table ==
Pos	Team	Pld	W	D	L	GF	GA	GD	Pts	Qualification or relegation
7	Newcastle United	38	17	7	14	47	42	+5	58	Qualification for the Intertoto Cup third round
8	Bolton Wanderers	38	15	11	12	49	41	+8	56	
9	West Ham United	38	16	7	15	52	55	−3	55	Qualification for the UEFA Cup first round (Note: Since Liverpool had already qualified for the Champions League, their UEFA Cup berth as the FA Cup winners went to West Ham, who were the FA Cup runners-up.)
10	Wigan Athletic	38	15	6	17	45	52	−7	51	
11	Everton	38	14	8	16	34	49	−15	50	

Source: Barclays Premier League
Rules for classification: 1) points; 2) goal difference; 3) number of goals scored.

== First-team squad ==
Squad at end of season

Note: Flags indicate national team as defined under FIFA eligibility rules; some limited exceptions apply. Players may hold more than one non-FIFA nationality.

No.	Pos.	Nation	Player
1	GK	NIR	Roy Carroll
2	DF	ARG	Lionel Scaloni (on loan from Deportivo La Coruña)
3	DF	ENG	Paul Konchesky
4	DF	WAL	Danny Gabbidon
5	DF	ENG	Anton Ferdinand
6	MF	WAL	Carl Fletcher
7	DF	SCO	Christian Dailly
8	FW	ENG	Teddy Sheringham
9	FW	ENG	Dean Ashton
10	FW	ENG	Marlon Harewood
11	MF	ENG	Matthew Etherington
13	GK	ENG	Stephen Bywater
15	MF	ISR	Yossi Benayoun
17	MF	ENG	Hayden Mullins

No.	Pos.	Nation	Player
18	FW	ISR	Yaniv Katan
19	DF	WAL	James Collins
20	MF	ENG	Nigel Reo-Coker (captain)
22	DF	ENG	Elliott Ward
23	GK	ENG	Jimmy Walker
24	MF	ENG	Mark Noble
25	FW	ENG	Bobby Zamora
26	MF	ENG	Shaun Newton
29	MF	ENG	Hogan Ephraim
30	DF	IRL	Clive Clarke
32	DF	ENG	Darren Blewitt
34	GK	TTO	Shaka Hislop
35	MF	ENG	Kyel Reid
41	GK	ENG	Matthew Reed

=== Left club during season ===
Note: Flags indicate national team as defined under FIFA eligibility rules; some limited exceptions apply. Players may hold more than one non-FIFA nationality.

No.	Pos.	Nation	Player
2	DF	CZE	Tomáš Řepka (to Sparta Prague)
12	MF	NIR	Steve Lomas (to Queens Park Rangers)
14	MF	ENG	Chris Cohen (on loan to Yeovil Town)
16	MF	WAL	Gavin Williams (to Ipswich Town)
18	FW	FRA	Youssef Sofiane (to Coventry City)
21	DF	SCO	Malky Mackay (to Watford)
21	FW	FRA	David Bellion (on loan from Manchester United)

No.	Pos.	Nation	Player
27	FW	CZE	Petr Mikolanda (on loan to Rushden and Diamonds)
28	MF	AUS	Trent McClenahan (on loan to Milton Keynes Dons)
31	MF	ENG	Tony Stokes (on loan to Rushden & Diamonds)
33	FW	ENG	Moses Ashikodi (to Rangers)
36	MF	ENG	Luke Chadwick (to Stoke City)
39	FW	FRA	Jérémie Aliadière (on loan from Arsenal)

== Results ==
=== Premier League ===
==== Results per matchday ====
Matchday	1	2	3	4	5	6	7	8	9	10	11	12	13	14	15	16	17	18	19	20	21	22	23	24	25	26	27	28	29	30	31	32	33	34	35	36	37	38
Ground	H	A	H	H	A	H	A	A	H	A	H	A	H	A	A	A	H	A	H	A	H	A	H	A	H	H	H	A	H	A	A	H	A	H	A	H	A	H
Result	W	D	L	W	W	D	D	L	W	L	W	D	L	W	L	W	L	D	L	L	L	W	W	W	W	W	D	L	L	W	L	D	L	W	L	L	W	W
Position	2	4	9	7	4	4	6	9	9	9	8	8	9	9	9	7	9	9	9	10	10	10	9	9	8	6	8	9	10	9	9	8	9	7	9	10	9	9

A = Away; H = Home; W = Win; D = Draw; L = Loss

13 August 2005 1	West Ham United	3–1	Blackburn Rovers	London
	Sheringham 46'; Reo-Coker 62'; Etherington 80'	Report	Todd 18'; Dickov (red card) 81'	Stadium: Boleyn Ground; Attendance: 33,305; Referee: Alan Wiley

20 August 2005 2	Newcastle United	0–0	West Ham United	Newcastle upon Tyne
		Report	Konchesky (red card) 55'	Stadium: St. James' Park; Attendance: 51,620; Referee: Dermot Gallagher

27 August 2005 3	West Ham United	1–2	Bolton Wanderers	London
	Sheringham 90' (pen.)	Report	Nolan 59'; Campo 85'	Stadium: Upton Park; Attendance: 31,629; Referee: Phil Dowd

12 September 2005 4	West Ham United	4–0	Aston Villa	London
	Harewood 25', 29', 50'; Benayoun 89'	Report		Stadium: Upton Park; Attendance: 29,582; Referee: Rob Styles

17 September 2005 5	Fulham	1–2	West Ham United	London
	Boa Morte 66'	Report	Harewood 46'; Warner 52' (o.g.)	Stadium: Craven Cottage; Attendance: 21,907; Referee: Graham Poll

24 September 2005 6	West Ham United	0–0	Arsenal	London
		Report		Stadium: Upton Park; Attendance: 34,742; Referee: Mike Dean

1 October 2005 7	Sunderland	1–1	West Ham United	Sunderland
	Miller 45'	Report	Benayoun 72'	Stadium: Stadium of Light

16 October 2005 8	Manchester City	2–1	West Ham United	Manchester
	A. Cole 18', 56'	Report	Zamora 90'	Stadium: City of Manchester Stadium; Attendance: 43,647; Referee: Mark Clattenburg

23 October 2005 9	West Ham United	2–1	Middlesbrough	London
	Sheringham 66'; Riggott 74' (o.g.)	Report	Queudrue 87'	Stadium: Upton Park; Attendance: 34,612; Referee: Steve Bennett

29 October 2005 10	Liverpool	2–0	West Ham United	Liverpool
	Alonso 18'; Zenden 82'	Report		Stadium: Anfield; Attendance: 44,537; Referee: Uriah Rennie

5 November 2005 11	West Ham United	1–0	West Bromwich Albion	London
	Sheringham 57'	Report		Stadium: Upton Park; Attendance: 34,325; Referee: Peter Walton

20 November 2005 12	Tottenham Hotspur	1–1	West Ham United	London
	Mido 16'	Report	Ferdinand 90'	Stadium: White Hart Lane; Attendance: 36,154; Referee: Alan Wiley

27 November 2005 13	West Ham United	1–2	Manchester United	London
	Harewood 2'	Report	Rooney 47'; O'Shea 56'	Stadium: Boleyn Ground; Attendance: 34,755; Referee: Steve Bennett

5 December 2005 14	Birmingham City	1–2	West Ham United	Birmingham
	Heskey 11'	Report	Zamora 36'; Harewood 45'	Stadium: St Andrew's; Attendance: 24,010; Referee: Martin Atkinson

10 December 2005 15	Blackburn Rovers	3–2	West Ham United	Blackburn
	Dickov 56' (pen.), 57'; Kuqi 76'	Report	Zamora 45'; Harewood 63'	Stadium: Ewood Park; Attendance: 20,370; Referee: Mike Riley

14 December 2005 16	Everton	1–2	West Ham United	Liverpool
	Beattie 9'	Report	Weir 19' (o.g.); Zamora 67'	Stadium: Goodison Park; Attendance: 35,704; Referee: Peter Walton

17 December 2005 17	West Ham United	2–4	Newcastle United	London
	Solano 20' (o.g.); Harewood 73' (pen.)	Report	Owen 5', 43', 90'; Shearer 66'	Stadium: Upton Park; Attendance: 34,836; Referee: Phil Dowd

26 December 2005 18	Portsmouth	1–1	West Ham United	Portsmouth
	O'Neil 17'	Report	Collins 56'	Stadium: Fratton Park; Attendance: 20,168; Referee: Alan Wiley

28 December 2005 19	West Ham United	0–2	Wigan Athletic	London
		Report	Roberts 43'; Camara 45'	Stadium: Upton Park; Attendance: 34,131; Referee: Steve Bennett

31 December 2005 20	Charlton Athletic	2–0	West Ham United	London
	Bartlett 21'; D. Bent 63'	Report		Stadium: The Valley; Attendance: 25,952; Referee: Graham Poll

2 January 2006 21	West Ham United	1–3	Chelsea	London
	Harewood 46'	Report	Lampard 25'; Crespo 61'; Drogba 80'	Stadium: Upton Park; Attendance: 34,758; Referee: Howard Webb

14 January 2006 22	Aston Villa	1–2	West Ham United	Birmingham
	Hendrie 27'	Report	Zamora 51'; Harewood 60'	Stadium: Villa Park; Attendance: 36,700; Referee: Phil Dowd

23 January 2006 23	West Ham United	2–1	Fulham	London
	Ferdinand 17'; Benayoun 28'	Report	Helguson 52'	Stadium: Upton Park; Attendance: 29,812; Referee: Uriah Rennie

1 February 2006 24	Arsenal	2–3	West Ham United	London
	Henry 45'; Pires 89'	Report	Reo-Coker 25'; Zamora 32'; Etherington 80'	Stadium: Highbury; Attendance: 38,216; Referee: Mark Halsey

4 February 2006 25	West Ham United	2–0	Sunderland	London
	Ashton 81'; Konchesky 87'	Report		Stadium: Upton Park; Attendance: 34,745; Referee: Rob Styles

13 February 2006 26	West Ham United	3–0	Birmingham City	London
	Harewood 11', 63'; Ashton 65'	Report		Stadium: Upton Park; Attendance: 31,294; Referee: Dermot Gallagher

4 March 2006 27	West Ham United	2–2	Everton	London
	Harewood 10'; Ashton 23'	Report	Osman 18'; Beattie 71'	Stadium: Upton Park; Attendance: 34,866; Referee: Mike Riley

11 March 2006 28	Bolton Wanderers	4–1	West Ham United	Bolton
	Giannakopoulos 12', 33'; Speed 45'; Pedersen 81'	Report	Sheringham 79'	Stadium: Reebok Stadium; Attendance: 24,461; Referee: Mike Dean

18 March 2006 29	West Ham United	2–4	Portsmouth	London
	Sheringham 69'; Benayoun 90'	Report	LuaLua 19'; Davis 25'; Mendes 42'; Todorov 77'	Stadium: Upton Park; Attendance: 34,837; Referee: Alan Wiley

25 March 2006 30	Wigan Athletic	1–2	West Ham United	Wigan
	McCulloch 45'	Report	Harewood 52'; Reo-Coker 90'	Stadium: JJB Stadium; Attendance: 18,736; Referee: Dermot Gallagher

29 March 2006 31	Manchester United	1–0	West Ham United	Trafford
	Van Nistelrooy 45'	Report		Stadium: Old Trafford; Attendance: 69,522; Referee: Graham Poll

2 April 2006 32	West Ham United	0–0	Charlton Athletic	London
		Report		Stadium: Upton Park; Attendance: 34,753; Referee: Rob Styles

9 April 2006 33	Chelsea	4–1	West Ham United	London
	Maniche (red card) 17'; Drogba 28'; Crespo 31'; Terry 54'; Gallas 69'	Report	Collins 10'	Stadium: Stamford Bridge; Attendance: 41,919; Referee: Chris Foy

15 April 2006 34	West Ham United	1–0	Manchester City	London
	Newton 15'	Report		Stadium: Upton Park; Attendance: 34,305; Referee: Steve Bennett

17 April 2006 35	Middlesbrough	2–0	West Ham United	Middlesbrough
	Hasselbaink 41'; Maccarone 57' (pen.)	Report		Stadium: Riverside Stadium; Attendance: 27,658; Referee: Martin Atkinson

26 April 2006 36	West Ham United	1–2	Liverpool	London
	Reo-Coker 46'; Mullins (red card) 82'	Report	Cissé 19', 54'; García (red card) 82'	Stadium: Upton Park; Attendance: 34,852; Referee: Howard Webb

1 May 2006 37	West Bromwich Albion	0–1	West Ham United	West Bromwich
		Report	Reo-Coker 42'	Stadium: The Hawthorns; Attendance: 24,462; Referee: Graham Poll

7 May 2006 38	West Ham United	2–1	Tottenham Hotspur	London
	Fletcher 10'; Benayoun 80'	Report	Defoe 35'	Stadium: Upton Park; Attendance: 34,970; Referee: Chris Foy

=== League Cup ===
20 September 2005 Second round	Sheffield Wednesday	2–4	West Ham United	Sheffield
	Coughlan 76'; Graham 77'	Report	Zamora 2', 63'; Dailly 54'; Bellion 84'	Stadium: Hillsborough; Attendance: 14,976; Referee: Steve Tanner

26 October 2005 Third round	Bolton Wanderers	1–0	West Ham United	Bolton
	Borghetti 64'	Report		Stadium: Reebok Stadium; Attendance: 10,927; Referee: Andre Marriner

=== FA Cup ===
7 January 2006 Third round	Norwich City	1–2	West Ham United	Norwich
	McVeigh 72' (pen.)	Report	Mullins 6'; Zamora 57'	Stadium: Carrow Road; Attendance: 23,968; Referee: Mike Riley

28 January 2006 Fourth round	West Ham United	4–2	Blackburn Rovers	London
	Sheringham 33' (pen.); Etherington 39'; Khizanishvili 59' (o.g.); Zamora 73'	Report	Bentley 1'; Neill 65'	Stadium: Upton Park; Attendance: 23,700; Referee: Martin Atkinson

18 February 2006 Fifth round	Bolton Wanderers	0–0	West Ham United	Bolton
		Report		Stadium: Reebok Stadium; Attendance: 17,120; Referee: Chris Foy

15 March 2006 Fifth round Replay	West Ham United	2–1 (a.e.t.)	Bolton Wanderers	London
	Jääskeläinen 10' (o.g.); Harewood 96'	Report	K. Davies 31'	Stadium: Upton Park; Attendance: 24,685; Referee: Rob Styles

20 March 2006 Sixth round	Manchester City	1–2	West Ham United	Manchester
	Musampa 85'; Jihai (red card)	Report	Ashton 41', 69'	Stadium: City of Manchester Stadium; Attendance: 39,357; Referee: Howard Webb

23 April 2006 Semi-final	Middlesbrough	0–1	West Ham United	Birmingham
		Report	Harewood 78'	Stadium: Villa Park; Attendance: 39,148; Referee: Mike Riley

13 May 2006 Final	Liverpool	3–3 (a.e.t.) (3–1 p)	West Ham United	Cardiff
	Cissé 32'; Gerrard 54', 90'	Report	Carragher 21' (o.g.); Ashton 28'; Konchesky 64'	Stadium: Millennium Stadium; Attendance: 71,140; Referee: Alan Wiley
	Penalties
	Hamann (penalty scored); Hyypiä (penalty missed); Gerrard (penalty scored); Riise (penalty scored)		Zamora (penalty missed); Sheringham (penalty scored); Konchesky (penalty missed); Ferdinand (penalty missed)

== Statistics ==
=== Overview ===
Competition	Record							
Competition	P	W	D	L	GF	GA	GD	Win %
Premier League	38	16	7	15	52	55	−3	42.11
FA Cup	7	5	1	1	14	8	+6	71.43
League Cup	2	1	0	1	4	3	+1	50.00
Total	47	22	8	17	70	66	+4	46.81

=== Goalscorers ===
Rank	Pos	No.	Nat	Name	Premier League	FA Cup	League Cup	Total
1	ST	10	(England)	Marlon Harewood	14	2	0	16
2	ST	25	(England)	Bobby Zamora	6	2	2	10
3	ST	8	(England)	Teddy Sheringham	6	1	0	7
3	Own goals				4	0	0	4
5	ST	9	(England)	Dean Ashton	3	3	0	6
6	MF	15	(Israel)	Yossi Benayoun	5	0	0	5
6	MF	20	(England)	Nigel Reo-Coker	5	0	0	5
8	MF	11	(England)	Matthew Etherington	2	1	0	3
9	DF	3	(England)	Paul Konchesky	1	1	0	2
9	DF	5	(England)	Anton Ferdinand	2	0	0	2
9	DF	19	(Wales)	James Collins	2	0	0	2
12	MF	6	(Wales)	Carl Fletcher	1	0	0	1
12	DF	7	(Scotland)	Christian Dailly	0	0	1	1
12	MF	17	(England)	Hayden Mullins	0	1	0	1
12	ST	20	(France)	David Bellion	0	0	1	1
12	MF	26	(England)	Shaun Newton	1	0	0	1
Totals					52	14	4	66

=== Appearances and goals ===
No.	Pos	Nat	Player	Total		Premier League		FA Cup		League Cup	
No.	Pos	Nat	Player	Apps	Goals	Apps	Goals	Apps	Goals	Apps	Goals
Goalkeepers
1	GK	(Northern Ireland) NIR	Roy Carroll	19	0	19	0	0	0	0	0
13	GK	(England) ENG	Stephen Bywater	1	0	0+1	0	0	0	0	0
23	GK	(England) ENG	Jimmy Walker	3	0	3	0	0	0	0	0
34	GK	(Trinidad and Tobago) TTO	Shaka Hislop	25	0	16	0	7	0	2	0
Defenders
2	DF	(Czech Republic) CZE	Tomáš Řepka	22	0	19	0	1	0	2	0
2	DF	(Argentina) ARG	Lionel Scaloni	17	0	13	0	3+1	0	0	0
3	DF	(England) ENG	Paul Konchesky	45	2	36+1	1	7	1	1	0
4	DF	(Wales) WAL	Daniel Gabbidon	39	0	31+1	0	7	0	0	0
5	DF	(England) ENG	Anton Ferdinand	38	2	32+1	2	5	0	0	0
7	DF	(Scotland) SCO	Christian Dailly	30	1	6+16	0	2+4	0	2	1
14	DF	(England) ENG	Chris Cohen	1	0	0	0	0	0	1	0
19	DF	(Wales) WAL	James Collins	19	2	13+1	2	3	0	2	0
22	DF	(England) ENG	Elliott Ward	6	0	3+1	0	0	0	2	0
30	DF	(Republic of Ireland) IRL	Clive Clarke	3	0	2	0	0	0	1	0
Midfielders
6	MF	(Wales) WAL	Carl Fletcher	17	1	6+6	1	1+3	0	0+1	0
11	MF	(England) ENG	Matthew Etherington	40	3	33	2	7	1	0	0
15	MF	(Israel) ISR	Yossi Benayoun	40	5	30+4	5	6	0	0	0
16	MF	(Wales) WAL	Gavin Williams	1	0	0	0	0	0	1	0
17	MF	(England) ENG	Hayden Mullins	42	1	35	0	6	1	1	0
20	MF	(England) ENG	Nigel Reo-Coker	38	5	31	5	7	0	0	0
24	MF	(England) ENG	Mark Noble	6	0	4+1	0	0	0	1	0
26	MF	(England) ENG	Shaun Newton	30	1	8+18	1	1+1	0	1+1	0
31	MF	(England) ENG	Tony Stokes	1	0	0	0	0	0	0+1	0
35	MF	(England) ENG	Kyel Reid	2	0	1+1	0	0	0	0	0
Forwards
8	FW	(England) ENG	Teddy Sheringham	31	7	15+11	6	1+3	1	1	0
9	FW	(England) ENG	Dean Ashton	16	6	9+2	3	5	3	0	0
10	FW	(England) ENG	Marlon Harewood	46	16	31+6	14	6+1	2	2	0
18	FW	(Israel) ISR	Yaniv Katan	8	0	2+4	0	0+2	0	0	0
21	FW	(France) FRA	David Bellion	10	1	2+6	0	0	0	1+1	1
25	FW	(England) ENG	Bobby Zamora	42	10	17+17	6	2+5	2	1	2
29	FW	(England) ENG	Hogan Ephraim	1	0	0	0	0	0	0+1	0
39	FW	(France) FRA	Jérémie Aliadière	8	0	1+6	0	0	0	0+1	0

== Transfers ==
=== In ===
Date	Pos.	Name	From	Fee
5 July 2005	DF	(England) Paul Konchesky	(England) Charlton Athletic	£2m
5 July 2005	DF	(Wales) Danny Gabbidon	(Wales) Cardiff City	£4.5m (Note: The £4.5m to Cardiff City was a joint fee for both Daniel Gabbidon and James Collins)
5 July 2005	DF	(Wales) James Collins	(Wales) Cardiff City	£4.5m
7 July 2005	ST	(Czech Republic) Petr Mikolanda	(Czech Republic) Viktoria Žižkov	Undisclosed
19 July 2005	MF	(Israel) Yossi Benayoun	(Spain) Racing Santander	£2.5M
29 July 2005	GK	(Trinidad and Tobago) Shaka Hislop	(England) Portsmouth	Free
1 August 2005	DF	(Republic of Ireland) Clive Clarke	(England) Stoke City	£275,000
31 August 2005	MF	(France) Sekou Baradji	(France) Lens	Undisclosed
1 January 2006	ST	(Israel) Yaniv Katan	(Israel) Maccabi Haifa	Undisclosed
23 January 2006	ST	(England) Dean Ashton	(England) Norwich City	£7.25m

=== Out ===
Date	Pos.	Name	To	Fee
1 June 2005	DF	(Wales) Andy Melville	Retired	
7 June 2005	ST	(Ukraine) Serhii Rebrov	(Ukraine) Dynamo Kyiv	Free
22 June 2005	DF	(England) Rufus Brevett	(England) Plymouth Argyle	Free
22 June 2005	ST	(England) Greg Pearson	(England) Rushden & Diamonds	Undisclosed
11 July 2005	DF	(England) Chris Powell	(England) Charlton Athletic	Free
5 August 2005	MF	(Scotland) Don Hutchison	(England) Millwall	Free
19 August 2005	DF	(Scotland) Malky Mackay	(England) Watford	Free
31 August 2005	MF	(Northern Ireland) Steve Lomas	(England) Queens Park Rangers	Free
14 October 2005	ST	(France) Youssef Sofiane	(England) Coventry City	Free
4 January 2006	MF	(England) Luke Chadwick	(England) Stoke City	£100,000
11 January 2006	ST	(Antigua and Barbuda) Moses Ashikodi	(Scotland) Rangers	Free
23 January 2006	DF	(Czech Republic) Tomáš Řepka	(Czech Republic) Sparta Prague	Free

=== Loan In ===
Date	Pos.	Name	From	Length
17 August 2005	ST	(France) David Bellion	(England) Manchester United	Full Season (ended 9 January 2006)
25 August 2005	ST	(France) Jérémie Aliadière	(England) Arsenal	Full Season (ended 31 January 2006)
1 February 2006	DF	(Argentina) Lionel Scaloni	(Spain) Deportivo La Coruña	Until end of season

=== Loan Out ===
Date	Pos.	Name	To	Length
3 August 2005	GK	(England) Stephen Bywater	(England) Coventry City	Until December
4 August 2005	MF	(England) Luke Chadwick	(England) Stoke City	Six Months
15 August 2005	ST	(Antigua and Barbuda) Moses Ashikodi	(England) Gillingham	Until December
31 August 2005	MF	(France) Sekou Baradji	(England) Reading	Six Months
7 November 2005	DF	(England) Chris Cohen	(England) Yeovil Town	One Month
8 November 2005	MF	(Wales) Gavin Williams	(England) Ipswich Town	One Month
3 January 2006	DF	(Australia) Trent McClenahan	(England) MK Dons	Until end of season
31 January 2006	ST	(Czech Republic) Petr Mikolanda	(England) Rushden & Diamonds	Until end of season
