= 2011–12 Queens Park Rangers F.C. season =

English football club season

Queens Park Rangers
2011–12 season
- Chairman: Flavio Briatore (until 22 August); Tony Fernandes (from 23 August)
- Manager: Neil Warnock (until 8 January); Mark Hughes (from 10 January)
- Stadium: Loftus Road (capacity 18,360)
- Premier League: 17th
- FA Cup: Fourth round
- League Cup: Second round
- Top goalscorer: League: Heiðar Helguson (8); All: Heiðar Helguson (10)
- Highest home attendance: 18,076 (vs. Manchester City, 5 November)
- Lowest home attendance: 15,195 (vs. Bolton Wanderers, 13 August)
- Average home league attendance: 17,295
- Biggest win: 3-0 Vs Wolverhampton Wanderers (17 September 2011), Swansea City (11 April 2012)
- Biggest defeat: 0-6 Vs Fulham (2 October 2011)
Home colours	Away colours	Third colours

The 2011–12 season was Queens Park Rangers's 123rd professional season and their fifth season in the Premier League. The club competed in the Premier League for the first time in fifteen years, following their promotion as champions from The Championship in 2010–11. The club finished the season in 17th place, avoiding relegation by one point on the final day of the season.

== Kit ==
Lotto Sport Italia continued as manufacturers of QPR's kit. Airlines Malaysia Airlines and AirAsia became new kit sponsors.

== First-team squad ==
Squad at end of season

=== First team squad ===
Ages as of 13 May 2012.

No.	Name	Nationality	Position (s)	Since	Date of birth (age)	Signed from
Goalkeepers
1	Paddy Kenny	(Republic of Ireland) (Note: Kenny was born in Halifax, England, but also qualified to represent the Republic of Ireland internationally through his parents and made his international debut for the Republic of Ireland in June 2004.)	GK	2010	17 May 1978 (aged 33)	(England) Sheffield United
24	Radek Černý	(Czech Republic)	GK	2008	18 February 1974 (aged 38)	(Czech Republic) Slavia Prague
26	Brian Murphy	(Republic of Ireland)	GK	2011	7 May 1983 (aged 29)	(England) Ipswich Town
Defenders
3	Clint Hill	(England)	CB / LB	2010	19 October 1978 (aged 33)	(England) Crystal Palace
5	Fitz Hall	(England)	CB	2008	20 February 1980 (aged 32)	(England) Wigan Athletic
6	Danny Gabbidon	(Wales)	CB	2011	8 August 1979 (aged 32)	(England) West Ham United
13	Armand Traoré	(Senegal) (Note: Traoré was born in Chatenay-Malabry, France, and represented them at U-17, U-18, U-19, and U-21 level, but also qualifies to represent Senegal internationally and made his international debut for Senegal in August 2011.)	LB / LM	2011	8 October 1989 (aged 22)	(England) Arsenal
15	Bruno Perone	(Brazil)	CB	2011	6 June 1987 (aged 24)	On loan from (Brazil) Tombense
16	Matthew Connolly	(England)	CB	2008	24 September 1987 (aged 24)	(England) Arsenal
18	Luke Young	(England)	RB	2011	19 July 1979 (aged 32)	(England) Aston Villa
27	Peter Ramage	(England)	CB	2008	22 November 1983 (aged 28)	(England) Newcastle United
28	Danny Shittu	(Nigeria)	CB	2011	2 September 1980 (aged 31)	(England) Millwall
34	Taye Taiwo	(Nigeria)	LB	2012	16 April 1985 (aged 27)	On loan from (Italy) Milan
35	Anton Ferdinand	(England)	CB	2011	18 February 1985 (aged 27)	(England) Sunderland
40	Michael Harriman	(England)	RB	2011	23 October 1992 (aged 19)	(England) Queens Park Rangers Academy
42	Nedum Onuoha	(England)	RB	2012	12 November 1986 (aged 25)	(England) Manchester City
Midfielders
2	Samba Diakité	(Mali) (Note: Diakité was born in Montfermeil, France, but also qualifies to represent Mali internationally and made his international debut for Mali in January 2012.)	DM	2012	24 January 1989 (aged 23)	On loan from (France) Nancy
4	Shaun Derry	(England)	DM	2010	6 December 1977 (aged 34)	(England) Crystal Palace
7	Adel Taarabt	(Morocco) (Note: Taarabt was born in Fez, Morocco, but was raised in France and represented them at U-17 and U-19 level before making his international debut for Morocco in February 2009.)	AM	2009	24 May 1989 (aged 22)	(England) Tottenham Hotspur
8	Kieron Dyer	(England)	AM	2011	29 December 1978 (aged 33)	(England) West Ham United
11	Alejandro Faurlín	(Argentina)	CM	2009	9 August 1986 (aged 25)	(Argentina) Instituto Atlético
14	Ákos Buzsáky	(Hungary)	CM	2007	7 May 1982 (aged 30)	(England) Plymouth Argyle
17	Joey Barton	(England)	CM	2011	2 September 1982 (aged 29)	(England) Newcastle United
21	Tommy Smith	(England)	RM	2010	22 May 1980 (aged 31)	(England) Portsmouth
25	Hogan Ephraim	(England)	RM / LM	2007	31 March 1988 (aged 24)	(England) West Ham United
29	Michael Doughty	(Wales) (Note: Doughty was born in Westminster, England, but also qualifies to represent Wales internationally and has represented them at U-19 and U-21 level.)	LM	2010	20 November 1992 (aged 19)	(England) Queens Park Rangers Academy
32	Shaun Wright-Phillips	(England)	RW / LW	2011	25 October 1981 (aged 30)	(England) Manchester City
36	Bruno Andrade	(Portugal)	AM	2010	2 October 1993 (aged 18)	(England) Queens Park Rangers Academy
37	Lee Cook	(England)	LM	2004	3 July 1982 (aged 29)	(England) Watford
39	Jordan Gibbons	(England)	CM	2011	18 October 1993 (aged 18)	(England) Queens Park Rangers Academy
Forwards
9	DJ Campbell	(England)	ST	2011	12 November 1981 (aged 30)	(England) Blackpool
10	Jay Bothroyd	(England)	CF	2011	5 May 1982 (aged 30)	(Wales) Cardiff City
12	Jamie Mackie	(Scotland) (Note: Mackie was born in Dorking, England, but also qualifies to represent Scotland internationally through his grandfather and made his international debut for Scotland in October 2010.)	ST / RW	2010	22 September 1985 (aged 26)	(England) Plymouth Argyle
19	Patrick Agyemang	(Ghana) (Note: Agyemang was born in Waltham Forest, England, but also qualified to represent Ghana internationally and made his international debut for Ghana in May 2003.)	CF	2008	29 September 1980 (aged 31)	(England) Preston North End
20	Rob Hulse	(England)	CF	2010	25 October 1979 (aged 32)	(England) Derby County
22	Heiðar Helguson	(Iceland)	CF	2008	22 August 1977 (aged 34)	(England) Bolton Wanderers
23	Djibril Cissé	(France)	CF	2012	12 August 1981 (aged 30)	(Italy) Lazio
30	Troy Hewitt	(England)	CF	2011	10 February 1990 (aged 22)	(England) Harrow Borough
33	Federico Macheda	(Italy)	ST	2012	22 August 1991 (aged 20)	On loan from (England) Manchester United
46	Ángelo Balanta	(Colombia)	ST	2007	1 July 1990 (aged 21)	(England) Queens Park Rangers Academy
52	Bobby Zamora	(England)	CF	2012	16 January 1981 (aged 31)	(England) Fulham

== Transfers ==
=== In ===
Date	No.	Pos.	Name	From	Fee	Source
13 July 2011	10	FW	(England) Jay Bothroyd	(Wales) Cardiff City	Free	
13 July 2011	8	MF	(England) Kieron Dyer	(England) West Ham United	Free	
25 July 2011	6	DF	(Wales) Danny Gabbidon	(England) West Ham United	Free	
4 August 2011	9	FW	(England) DJ Campbell	(England) Blackpool	£1.25 million	
10 August 2011	26	GK	(Republic of Ireland) Brian Murphy	(England) Ipswich Town	Free	
26 August 2011	17	MF	(England) Joey Barton	(England) Newcastle United	Free	
27 August 2011	18	DF	(England) Luke Young	(England) Aston Villa	Undisclosed	
30 August 2011	13	DF	(Senegal) Armand Traoré	(England) Arsenal	£1.3 million	
31 August 2011	32	MF	(England) Shaun Wright-Phillips	(England) Manchester City	£4 million	
31 August 2011	35	DF	(England) Anton Ferdinand	(England) Sunderland	£3 million	
26 January 2012	42	DF	(England) Nedum Onuoha	(England) Manchester City	£4.2 million	
31 January 2012	23	FW	(France) Djibril Cissé	(Italy) Lazio	£4.4 million	
31 January 2012	52	FW	(England) Bobby Zamora	(England) Fulham	£5 million	

=== Out ===
Date	No.	Pos.	Name	To	Fee	Source
1 June 2011	6	MF	(Antigua and Barbuda) Mikele Leigertwood (Note: Leigertwood was born in Enfield, England, but also qualified to represent Antigua and Barbuda internationally and made his international debut for Antigua and Barbuda in November 2008.)	(England) Reading	Undisclosed	
1 June 2011	18	MF	(England) Gavin Mahon	(England) Notts County	Free Transfer	
1 June 2011	37	MF	(Cyprus) Georgios Tofas	(Cyprus) Anagennisi Dherynia	Released	
1 June 2011	35	MF	(Antigua and Barbuda) Josh Parker (Note: Parker was born in Slough, England, but also qualifies to represent Antigua and Barbuda internationally and made his international debut for Antigua and Barbuda in November 2010.)	(England) Oldham Athletic	Free Transfer	
1 June 2011	27	DF	(England) Lee Brown	(England) Bristol Rovers	Released	
1 June 2011	28	DF	(England) Joe Oastler	(England) Torquay United	Released	
1 June 2011	–	DF	(England) Elliot Cox	Unattached	Released	
1 June 2011	30	MF	(England) Romone Rose	(Thailand) Muangthong United	Released	
1 June 2011	39	DF	(France) Pascal Chimbonda	(England) Doncaster Rovers	Free Transfer	
19 August 2011	8	FW	(England) Leon Clarke	(England) Swindon Town	Released	
24 August 2011	13	DF	(Latvia) Kaspars Gorkšs	(England) Reading	£880,000	
31 August 2011	33	FW	(England) Antonio German	(England) Stockport County	Free Transfer	
30 September 2011	–	MF	(Italy) Matteo Alberti	(Italy) Lumezzane	Loan Return	
14 October 2011	–	FW	(Italy) Alessandro Pellicori	Unattached	Released	
31 January 2012	23	MF	(Norway) Petter Vaagan Moen	Unattached	Released	
31 January 2012	2	DF	(England) Bradley Orr	(England) Blackburn Rovers	Undisclosed	

=== Loans in ===
Start	No.	Pos.	Name	From	Expiry	Source
11 August 2011	15	DF	(Brazil) Bruno Perone	(Brazil) Tombense	6 June 2012	
1 September 2011	42	MF	(England) Jason Puncheon	(England) Southampton	2 January 2012	
2 January 2012	33	FW	(Italy) Federico Macheda	(England) Manchester United	13 May 2012	
24 January 2012	34	DF	(Nigeria) Taye Taiwo	(Italy) Milan	13 May 2012	
30 January 2012	2	MF	(Mali) Samba Diakité	(France) Nancy	13 May 2012	

=== Loans out ===
Start	No.	Pos.	Name	To	Expiry	Source
21 July 2011	–	MF	(Germany) Max Ehmer	(England) Yeovil Town	31 December 2011	
1 August 2011	46	FW	(Colombia) Ángelo Balanta	(England) Milton Keynes Dons	31 December 2011	
5 August 2011	27	DF	(England) Peter Ramage	(England) Crystal Palace	15 January 2012	
12 August 2011	–	GK	(Latvia) Elvijs Putninš	(England) Boreham Wood	30 April 2012	
19 August 2011	29	MF	(Wales) Michael Doughty	(England) Crawley Town	21 January 2012	
27 August 2011	–	FW	(England) Rowan Vine	(England) Exeter City	26 September 2011	
22 September 2011	3	DF	(England) Clint Hill	(England) Nottingham Forest	22 October 2011	
26 September 2011	–	MF	(Republic of Ireland) Martin Rowlands (Note: Rowlands was born in Hammersmith and Fulham, England, but also qualified to represent the Republic of Ireland internationally and represented them at U-21 level before making his international debut for the Republic of Ireland in 2004.)	(England) Wycombe Wanderers	26 December 2011	
29 September 2011	46	MF	(Portugal) Bruno Andrade	(England) Aldershot Town	29 October 2011	
29 September 2011	30	FW	(England) Troy Hewitt	(England) Dagenham & Redbridge	29 October 2011	
13 October 2011	19	FW	(Ghana) Patrick Agyemang	(England) Millwall	9 November 2011	
15 November 2011	25	MF	(England) Hogan Ephraim	(England) Charlton Athletic	3 January 2012	
24 November 2011	37	MF	(England) Lee Cook	(England) Leyton Orient	21 January 2012	
31 January 2012	16	DF	(England) Matthew Connolly	(England) Reading	3 May 2012	
5 March 2012	29	MF	(Wales) Michael Doughty	(England) Aldershot Town	1 April 2012	
8 March 2012	19	FW	(Ghana) Patrick Agyemang	(England) Stevenage	9 June 2012	
17 March 2012	–	MF	(Germany) Max Ehmer	(England) Preston North End	17 May 2012	
19 March 2012	37	MF	(England) Lee Cook	(England) Charlton Athletic	31 May 2012	
22 March 2012	25	MF	(England) Hogan Ephraim	(England) Bristol City	30 April 2012	
22 March 2012	–	FW	(England) Rowan Vine	(England) Gillingham	31 May 2012	

== Season statistics ==
=== Premier League table ===
Pos	Team	Pld	W	D	L	GF	GA	GD	Pts	Qualification or relegation
15	Wigan Athletic	38	11	10	17	42	62	−20	43	
16	Aston Villa	38	7	17	14	37	53	−16	38	
17	Queens Park Rangers	38	10	7	21	43	66	−23	37	
18	Bolton Wanderers (R)	38	10	6	22	46	77	−31	36	Relegation to Football League Championship
19	Blackburn Rovers (R)	38	8	7	23	48	78	−30	31	Relegation to Football League Championship

Source: Barclays Premier League
Rules for classification: 1) points; 2) goal difference; 3) number of goals scored.
(R) Relegated

=== Results summary ===
Overall								Home						Away					
Pld	W	D	L	GF	GA	GD	Pts	W	D	L	GF	GA	GD	W	D	L	GF	GA	GD
38	10	7	21	43	66	−23	37	7	5	7	24	25	−1	3	2	14	19	41	−22

Last updated: 14 May 2012.
Source: QPR.CO.UK

=== Results by match ===
Matchday	1	2	3	4	5	6	7	8	9	10	11	12	13	14	15	16	17	18	19	20	21	22	23	24	25	26	27	28	29	30	31	32	33	34	35	36	37	38
Ground	H	A	A	H	A	H	A	H	H	A	H	A	A	H	A	H	H	A	A	H	A	H	A	H	A	H	H	A	H	A	H	A	H	A	H	A	H	A
Result	L	W	L	D	W	D	L	D	W	L	L	W	L	D	L	L	L	D	L	L	L	W	D	L	L	L	D	L	W	L	W	L	W	L	W	L	W	L
Position	20	9	11	11	9	9	11	10	10	12	12	9	11	11	13	15	16	16	17	17	18	16	16	16	16	17	16	17	17	18	18	17	16	17	16	17	16	17

Updated to match(es) played on 14 May 2012. Source: QPR.CO.UK
A = Away; H = Home; W = Win; D = Draw; L = Loss

15 July 2011 Friendly	Harrow Borough	0–1	Queens Park Rangers	London
19:15 BST		Report	Kujabi 62'	Stadium: Earlsmead Stadium; Attendance: 1,688

== Pre-season ==
18 July 2011 Friendly	Tavistock	0–13	Queens Park Rangers	Tavistock
19:00 BST		Report	Ephraim 5', 27', 64', 73'; Smith 24'; Agyemang 37'; James 62' (o.g.); Shittu 65'; Helguson 72', 75'; Webber 77'; Vaagan Moen 84'; Connolly 88'	Stadium: Langsford Park

20 July 2011 Friendly	Plymouth Argyle	0–1	Queens Park Rangers	Plymouth
19:45 BST		Report	Helguson 90'	Stadium: Home Park; Attendance: 5,021

22 July 2011 Friendly	Bodmin Town	0–7	Queens Park Rangers	Bodmin
19:15 BST		Report	Connolly 5'; Webber 22', 49'; Vaagan Moen 31'; Smith 38', 69'; Helguson 86'	Stadium: Priory Park

27 July 2011 Friendly	Cesena (Italy)	1–0	Queens Park Rangers	Serravalle, San Marino
19:30 BST	Bogdani 84'	Report		Stadium: Stadio Olimpico

2 August 2011 Friendly	Crawley Town	2–4	Queens Park Rangers	Crawley
19:45 BST	Wassmer 58', 88'	Report	Gorkšs 11'; Helguson 48', 67'; Cook 80'	Stadium: Broadfield Stadium; Attendance: 1,415

5 August 2011 Friendly	Luton Town (England)	3–1	Queens Park Rangers	Luton
19:45 BST	Barnes-Holmer 74'; Morgan-Smith 83'; Watkins 88'	Report	Campbell 1'	Stadium: Kenilworth Road; Attendance: 3,170

=== Trofeo Bortolotti ===
The Trofeo Bortolotti is a triangular tournament, with each match lasting 45 minutes.

30 July 2011 1st Round	Braga (Portugal)	0–1	Queens Park Rangers	Bergamo, Italy
19:00 BST		Report	Bothroyd 19'	Stadium: Stadio Atleti Azzurri d'Italia

30 July 2011 Final	Atalanta (Italy)	1–1 (2–3 p)	Queens Park Rangers	Bergamo, Italy
21:00 BST	Padoin 27'	Report	Faurlín 21'	Stadium: Stadio Atleti Azzurri d'Italia
	Penalties
	Manfredini (penalty missed); Ardemagni (penalty scored); Radovanović (penalty scored); Marilungo (penalty missed); Capelli (penalty missed)		(penalty scored) Bothroyd; (penalty missed) Ephraim; (penalty missed) Buzsáky; (penalty scored) Taarabt; (penalty scored) Orr

=== Friendly matches ===
Date		Opponents	Venue	Score F–A	Scorers	Attendance
15-Jul-11	Friendly	Harrow Borough v Queens Park Rangers	A	1-0	Kujabi 62'	1668
18-Jul-11	Friendly	Tavistock v Queens Park Rangers	A	13-0	Ephraim 5', 27', 64', 73' Smith 24' Agyemang 37' James 62' (o.g.) Shittu 65' Helguson 72', 75' Webber 77' Vaagan Moen 84' Connolly 88'	
20-Jul-11	Friendly	Plymouth Argyle v Queens Park Rangers	A	1-0	Helguson 90'	5,021
22-Jul-11	Friendly	Bodmin Town v Queens Park Rangers	A	7-0	Connolly 5' Webber 22', 49' Vaagan Moen 31' Smith 38', 69' Helguson 86'	
27-Jul-11	Friendly	Cesena v Queens Park Rangers	A	0-1		
30-Jul-11	Trofeo Bortolotti	SC Braga v Queens Park Rangers	A	1-0	Bothroyd 19'	
30-Jul-11	Trofeo Bortolotti	Atalanta v Queens Park Rangers	A	1-1 (3-2 p)	Faurlín 21'	
2-Aug-11	Friendly	Crawley Town v Queens Park Rangers	A	4-2	Gorkšs 11' Helguson 48', 67' Cook 80'	1,415
3-Aug-11	Friendly	Woking FC v Queens Park Rangers	A			
5-Aug-11	Friendly	Luton Town v Queens Park Rangers	A	1-3	Campbell 1'	3,170
30-Aug-11	Private	Queens Park Rangers v Crystal Palace	H			
7-Sep-11	Private	Queens Park Rangers v Aldershot Town	H			
21-Sep-11	Private	Queens Park Rangers v Aldershot Town	H			
28-Sep-11	Private	Queens Park Rangers v Brighton & Hove Albion	H			
11-Oct-11	Private	Queens Park Rangers v Tottenham Hotspur	H			
19-Oct-11	Private	Queens Park Rangers v MK Dons	H			
1-Nov-11	Private	Queens Park Rangers v Reading	H			
7-Nov-11	Private	Queens Park Rangers v Peterborough United	H			
29-Nov-11	Private	Queens Park Rangers v Charlton Athletic	H			
6-Dec-11	Private	Queens Park Rangers v Leyton Orient	H			
13-Dec-11	Private	Queens Park Rangers v Tottenham Hotspur	H			
11-Jan-12	Private	Queens Park Rangers v Tottenham Hotspur	H			
21-Feb-12	Private	Watford v Queens Park Rangers	A			
28-Feb-12	Private	Crystal Palace v Queens Park Rangers	A			
6-Mar-12	Private	Queens Park Rangers v Brighton & Hove Albion	H			
20-Mar-12	Private	Queens Park Rangers v Reading	H			
24-Apr-12	Private	Tottenham Hotspur v Queens Park Rangers	A			

== Competitions ==
=== Barclays Premier League ===
13 August 2011 1	Queens Park Rangers	0–4	Bolton Wanderers	London
15:00 BST	Hill (red card) 90+4'	Report	Cahill 45+2'; Gabbidon 67' (o.g.); Klasnić 70'; Muamba 79'	Stadium: Loftus Road; Attendance: 15,195; Referee: Martin Atkinson

20 August 2011 2	Everton	0–1	Queens Park Rangers	Liverpool
15:00 BST		Report	Smith 31'	Stadium: Goodison Park; Attendance: 35,008; Referee: Kevin Friend

27 August 2011 3	Wigan Athletic	2–0	Queens Park Rangers	Wigan
12:30 BST	Rodríguez (yellow card) 33'; Di Santo 41', 66'; Caldwell (yellow card) 77'	Report		Stadium: DW Stadium; Attendance: 17,225; Referee: Michael Oliver

12 September 2011 4	Queens Park Rangers	0–0	Newcastle United	London
20:00 BST		Report		Stadium: Loftus Road; Attendance: 16,211; Referee: Phil Dowd

17 September 2011 5	Wolverhampton Wanderers	0–3	Queens Park Rangers	Wolverhampton
15:00 BST		Report	Barton 8'; Faurlín 10'; Campbell 87'	Stadium: Molineux; Attendance: 24,189; Referee: Anthony Taylor

25 September 2011 6	Queens Park Rangers	1–1	Aston Villa	London
16:00 BST	Traoré (yellow card) 90' (yellow-red card); Dunne 90+3' (o.g.)	Report	Bannan 58' (pen.)	Stadium: Loftus Road; Attendance: 16,707; Referee: Michael Oliver

2 October 2011 7	Fulham	6–0	Queens Park Rangers	London
15:00 BST	Johnson 2', 38', 59'; Sidwell (yellow card) 5'; Murphy 20' (pen.); Dempsey 65'; Hangeland (yellow card) 69'; Zamora 74'	Report	Hall (yellow card) 61'; Faurlín (yellow card) 68'; Wright-Phillips (yellow card) 82'	Stadium: Craven Cottage; Attendance: 23,766; Referee: Andre Marriner

15 October 2011 8	Queens Park Rangers	1–1	Blackburn Rovers	London
15:00 BST	Helguson 17'	Report	Samba 24'	Stadium: Loftus Road; Attendance: 16,487; Referee: Mark Clattenburg

23 October 2011 9	Queens Park Rangers	1–0	Chelsea	London
16:00 BST	Helguson 10' (pen.)	Report	Bosingwa (red card) 33'; Drogba (red card) 41'	Stadium: Loftus Road; Attendance: 18,050; Referee: Chris Foy

30 October 2011 10	Tottenham Hotspur	3–1	Queens Park Rangers	London
16:00 GMT	Bale 20', 72'; Van der Vaart 33'	Report	Bothroyd 62'	Stadium: White Hart Lane; Attendance: 36,147; Referee: Howard Webb

5 November 2011 11	Queens Park Rangers	2–3	Manchester City	London
17:30 GMT	Bothroyd 28'; Helguson 69'; Barton (yellow card) 81'	Report	Džeko 43'; Silva 52'; Y. Touré 74'; Balotelli (yellow card) 78'	Stadium: Loftus Road; Attendance: 18,076; Referee: Martin Atkinson

19 November 2011 12	Stoke City	2–3	Queens Park Rangers	Stoke-upon-Trent
15:00 GMT	Walters 8'; Shawcross 64'	Report	Helguson 22', 54'; Young 44'	Stadium: Britannia Stadium; Attendance: 27,618; Referee: Mike Jones

26 November 2011 13	Norwich City	2–1	Queens Park Rangers	Norwich
15:00 GMT	Martin 15'; Holt 73'	Report	Young 59'	Stadium: Carrow Road; Attendance: 26,781; Referee: Mark Clattenburg

30 November 2011	Queens Park Rangers	pp	Tottenham Hotspur	London
				Stadium: Loftus Road

3 December 2011 14	Queens Park Rangers	1–1	West Bromwich Albion	London
15:00 GMT	Helguson 20'	Report	Long 81'	Stadium: Loftus Road; Attendance: 17,290; Referee: Martin Atkinson

10 December 2011 15	Liverpool	1–0	Queens Park Rangers	Liverpool
15:00 GMT	Agger (yellow card) 22'; Suárez 47'; Bellamy (yellow card) 85'	Report		Stadium: Anfield; Attendance: 45,016; Referee: Lee Mason

18 December 2011 16	Queens Park Rangers	0–2	Manchester United	London
12:00 GMT	Gabbidon (yellow card) 26'	Report	Rooney 1'; Ferdinand (yellow card) 18'; Carrick 56'; Jones (yellow card) 61'	Stadium: Loftus Road; Attendance: 18,033; Referee: Howard Webb

21 December 2011 17	Queens Park Rangers	2–3	Sunderland	London
20:00 GMT	Helguson 63'; Mackie 67'	Report	Bendtner 19'; Sessègnon 53'; Brown 89'	Stadium: Loftus Road; Attendance: 16,167; Referee: Andre Marriner

27 December 2011 18	Swansea City	1–1	Queens Park Rangers	Swansea
17:00 GMT	Graham 14'	Report	Mackie 58'	Stadium: Liberty Stadium; Attendance: 19,530; Referee: Lee Probert

31 December 2011 19	Arsenal	1–0	Queens Park Rangers	London
15:00 GMT	Van Persie 60'	Report		Stadium: Emirates Stadium; Attendance: 60,067; Referee: Martin Atkinson

2 January 2012 20	Queens Park Rangers	1–2	Norwich City	London
15:00 GMT	Barton 11', (red card) 36'	Report	Pilkington 42'; Morison 83'	Stadium: Loftus Road; Attendance: 18,033; Referee: Neil Swarbrick

15 January 2012 21	Newcastle United	1–0	Queens Park Rangers	Newcastle upon Tyne
13:30 GMT	Best 37'	Report		Stadium: Sports Direct Arena; Attendance: 49,865; Referee: Chris Foy

21 January 2012 22	Queens Park Rangers	3–1	Wigan Athletic	London
15:00 GMT	Helguson 33' (pen.); Buzsáky 45'; Smith 81'	Report	Rodallega 66'	Stadium: Loftus Road; Attendance: 16,002; Referee: Jonathan Moss

1 February 2012 23	Aston Villa	2–2	Queens Park Rangers	Birmingham
19:45 GMT	Bent 45'; N'Zogbia 79'	Report	Cissé 12'; Warnock 29' (o.g.)	Stadium: Villa Park; Attendance: 32,063; Referee: Neil Swarbrick

4 February 2012 24	Queens Park Rangers	1–2	Wolverhampton Wanderers	London
15:00 GMT	Zamora 16'; Cissé (red card) 34'	Report	Jarvis 46'; Doyle 71'	Stadium: Loftus Road; Attendance: 17,351; Referee: Mark Clattenburg

11 February 2012 25	Blackburn Rovers	3–2	Queens Park Rangers	Blackburn
15:00 GMT	Yakubu 15'; Nzonzi 23'; Onuoha 45+4' (o.g.)	Report	Mackie 71', 90+2'	Stadium: Ewood Park; Attendance: 20,252; Referee: Mike Dean

25 February 2012 26	Queens Park Rangers	0–1	Fulham	London
15:00 GMT	Diakité (yellow card) 33' (yellow-red card)	Report	Pogrebnyak 7'	Stadium: Loftus Road; Attendance: 18,015; Referee: Phil Dowd

3 March 2012 27	Queens Park Rangers	1–1	Everton	London
15:00 GMT	Zamora 36'	Report	Drenthe 31'	Stadium: Loftus Road; Attendance: 18,033; Referee: Kevin Friend

10 March 2012 28	Bolton Wanderers	2–1	Queens Park Rangers	Bolton
12:45 GMT	Pratley 37'; Klasnić 86'	Report	Cissé 48'	Stadium: Reebok Stadium; Attendance: 21,551; Referee: Martin Atkinson

17 March 2012	Queens Park Rangers	pp	Liverpool	London
				Stadium: Loftus Road

21 March 2012 29	Queens Park Rangers	3–2	Liverpool	London
20:00 GMT	Derry 77'; Cissé 86'; Mackie 90+1'	Report	Coates 54'; Kuyt 72'	Stadium: Loftus Road; Attendance: 18,033; Referee: Howard Webb

24 March 2012 30	Sunderland	3–1	Queens Park Rangers	Sunderland
15:00 GMT	Bendtner 41'; McClean 70'; Sessègnon 76'	Report	Cissé (red card) 55'; Taiwo 79'	Stadium: Stadium of Light; Attendance: 37,128; Referee: Mike Jones

31 March 2012 31	Queens Park Rangers	2–1	Arsenal	London
15:00 BST	Taarabt 22'; Diakité 66'	Report	Walcott 37'	Stadium: Loftus Road; Attendance: 18,033; Referee: Mike Dean

8 April 2012 32	Manchester United	2–0	Queens Park Rangers	Manchester
13:30 BST	Rooney 15' (pen.); Scholes 68'; Rafael (yellow card) 73'	Report	Derry (red card) 14'	Stadium: Old Trafford; Attendance: 75,505; Referee: Lee Mason

11 April 2012 33	Queens Park Rangers	3–0	Swansea City	London
20:00 BST	Barton 45+1'; Mackie 55'; Buzsáky 67'; Taiwo (yellow card) 72'; Diakité (yellow card) 79'	Report		Stadium: Loftus Road; Attendance: 17,557; Referee: Lee Probert

14 April 2012 34	West Bromwich Albion	1–0	Queens Park Rangers	West Bromwich
15:00 BST	Dorrans 22', (yellow card) 70'; Mulumbu (yellow card) 51'; Ridgewell (yellow card) 61'	Report	Diakité (yellow card) 56'	Stadium: The Hawthorns; Attendance: 25,521; Referee: Jonathan Moss

21 April 2012 35	Queens Park Rangers	1–0	Tottenham Hotspur	London
17:30 BST	Zamora (yellow card) 22'; Taarabt 24', (yellow card) 42', (yellow card) 77' (yellow-red card); Onuoha (yellow card) 75'; Hill (yellow card) 79'	Report		Stadium: Loftus Road; Attendance: 18,021; Referee: Mark Clattenburg

29 April 2012 36	Chelsea	6–1	Queens Park Rangers	London
13:30 BST	Sturridge 1'; Terry 13'; Torres 18', 25', 64'; Malouda 80'	Report	Cissé 84'	Stadium: Stamford Bridge; Attendance: 41,675; Referee: Howard Webb

6 May 2012 37	Queens Park Rangers	1–0	Stoke City	London
14:00 BST	Cissé 89'	Report		Stadium: Loftus Road; Attendance: 17,319; Referee: Andre Marriner

13 May 2012 38	Manchester City	3–2	Queens Park Rangers	Manchester
15:00 BST	Zabaleta 39'; Džeko 90+2'; Agüero 90+4'	Report	Cissé 48'; Barton (red card) 55'; Mackie 66'	Stadium: Etihad Stadium; Attendance: 47,435; Referee: Mike Dean

=== FA Cup ===
7 January 2012 3rd Round	Milton Keynes Dons (League One)	1–1	Queens Park Rangers	Milton Keynes
15:00 GMT	Bowditch 65'	Report	Helguson 89'	Stadium: Stadium mk Attendance: 19,506; Referee: Michael Oliver

17 January 2012 3rd Round Replay	Queens Park Rangers	1–0	Milton Keynes Dons (League One)	London
20:00 GMT	Gabbidon 73'	Report		Stadium: Loftus Road; Attendance: 10,855; Referee: Phil Dowd

28 January 2012 4th Round	Queens Park Rangers	0–1	Chelsea (Premier League)	London
12:00 GMT	Wright-Phillips (yellow card) 29'; Hall (yellow card) 47'	Report	62' (pen.) Mata; (yellow card) 73' Cole; (yellow card) 90' Romeu	Stadium: Loftus Road; Attendance: 15,728; Referee: Mike Dean

=== Carling Cup ===
23 August 2011 First Round	Queens Park Rangers	0–2	Rochdale (League One)	London
19:45 BST		Report	Akpa Akpro 5'; Jones 81'	Stadium: Loftus Road; Attendance: 4,755; Referee: O. Langford

== Player statistics ==
As of the end of the season

=== Appearances, goals and discipline ===
No.	Pos.	Name	Barclays Premier League		FA Cup		Carling Cup		Total		Discipline	
No.	Pos.	Name	Apps	Goals	Apps	Goals	Apps	Goals	Apps	Goals	Yellow card	Red card
1	GK	(Republic of Ireland) Paddy Kenny	33	0	2	0	0	0	35	0	0	0
2	DF	(England) Bradley Orr	2(4)	0	0(1)	0	1	0	3(5)	0	0	0
2	MF	(Mali) Samba Diakité	9	1	0	0	0	0	9	1	6	1
3	DF	(England) Clint Hill	19(3)	0	3	0	0	0	22(3)	0	4	1
4	MF	(England) Shaun Derry	28(1)	1	2	0	0(1)	0	30(2)	1	4	1
5	DF	(England) Fitz Hall	11(3)	0	2	0	0	0	13(3)	0	4	0
6	DF	(Wales) Danny Gabbidon	15(2)	0	2	1	0	0	17(2)	1	1	0
7	MF	(Morocco) Adel Taarabt	24(3)	2	0	0	1	0	25(3)	2	3	1
8	MF	(England) Kieron Dyer	1	0	0	0	0	0	1	0	0	0
9	FW	(England) DJ Campbell	2(9)	1	1	0	0	0	3(9)	1	0	0
10	FW	(England) Jay Bothroyd	12(9)	2	1(1)	0	1	0	14(10)	2	3	0
11	MF	(Argentina) Alejandro Faurlín	20	1	1	0	0	0	21	1	3	0
12	FW	(Scotland) Jamie Mackie	24(7)	8	3	0	0	0	27(7)	8	2	0
13	DF	(Senegal) Armand Traoré	18(5)	0	0	0	0	0	18(5)	0	2	1
14	MF	(Hungary) Ákos Buzsáky	10(8)	2	2(1)	0	0	0	12(9)	2	0	0
15	DF	(Brazil) Bruno Perone	1	0	0	0	1	0	2	0	0	0
16	DF	(England) Matthew Connolly	5(1)	0	0	0	1	0	6(1)	0	1	0
17	MF	(England) Joey Barton	31	3	1	0	0	0	32	3	8	2
18	DF	(England) Luke Young	23	2	3	0	0	0	26	2	5	0
19	FW	(Ghana) Patrick Agyemang	2	0	0	0	0	0	2	0	0	0
20	FW	(England) Rob Hulse	1(1)	0	0(1)	0	0	0	1(2)	0	0	0
21	MF	(England) Tommy Smith	4(13)	2	2(1)	0	0	0	6(14)	2	0	0
22	FW	(Iceland) Heiðar Helguson	13(3)	8	1(2)	1	1	1	14(5)	10	2	0
23	FW	(France) Djibril Cissé	7(1)	6	0	0	0	0	7(1)	6	0	2
24	GK	(Czech Republic) Radek Černý	5	0	1	0	0	0	6	0	0	0
25	MF	(England) Hogan Ephraim	0(2)	0	0	0	1	0	1(2)	0	0	0
26	GK	(Republic of Ireland) Brian Murphy	0	0	0	0	1	0	1	0	0	0
28	DF	(Nigeria) Danny Shittu	0	0	0	0	1	0	1	0	0	0
30	FW	(England) Troy Hewitt	0	0	0	0	0(1)	0	0(1)	0	0	0
32	MF	(England) Shaun Wright-Phillips	24(8)	0	2	0	0	0	26(8)	0	4	0
33	FW	(Italy) Federico Macheda	0(3)	0	2(1)	0	0(0)	0	2(4)	0	1	0
34	DF	(Nigeria) Taye Taiwo	13(2)	1	0	0	0	0	13(2)	1	1	0
35	DF	(England) Anton Ferdinand	31	0	2	0	0	0	33	0	2	0
36	MF	(Portugal) Bruno Andrade	0(1)	0	0	0	1	0	1(1)	0	0	0
37	MF	(England) Lee Cook	0	0	0	0	1	0	1	0	0	0
38	MF	(Republic of Ireland) Martin Rowlands	0	0	0	0	1	0	1	0	0	0
40	DF	(England) Michael Harriman	0(1)	0	0	0	0(1)	0	0(2)	0	0	0
42	MF	(England) Jason Puncheon	0(2)	0	0	0	0	0	0(2)	0	0	0
42	DF	(England) Nedum Onuoha	16	0	0	0	0	0	16	0	2	0
52	FW	(England) Bobby Zamora	14	2	0	0	0	0	14	2	2	0

=== Goalscorers ===
Rank	Player	Position	PL	FAC	LC	Total
1	(Iceland) Heiðar Helguson	FW	8	1	0	9
2	(Scotland) Jamie Mackie	FW	8	0	0	8
3	(France) Djibril Cissé	FW	6	0	0	6
4	(England) Joey Barton	MF	3	0	0	3
5	(England) Jay Bothroyd	FW	2	0	0	2
5	(England) Luke Young	DF	2	0	0	2
5	(England) Tommy Smith	MF	2	0	0	2
5	(England) Bobby Zamora	FW	2	0	0	2
5	(Hungary) Ákos Buzsáky	MF	2	0	0	2
5	(Morocco) Adel Taarabt	MF	2	0	0	2
11	(England) Shaun Derry	MF	1	0	0	1
11	(Argentina) Alejandro Faurlín	MF	1	0	0	1
11	(Mali) Samba Diakité	MF	1	0	0	1
11	(England) DJ Campbell	FW	1	0	0	1
11	(Nigeria) Taye Taiwo	DF	1	0	0	1
11	(England) Danny Gabbidon	DF	0	1	0	1

=== Clean sheets ===
As of 22 August 2015

Rank	Player	Position	Premier League	League Cup	FA Cup	Total
1	(Republic of Ireland) Paddy Kenny	GK	7	0	1	8
