= Danny Gabbidon =

Welsh footballer

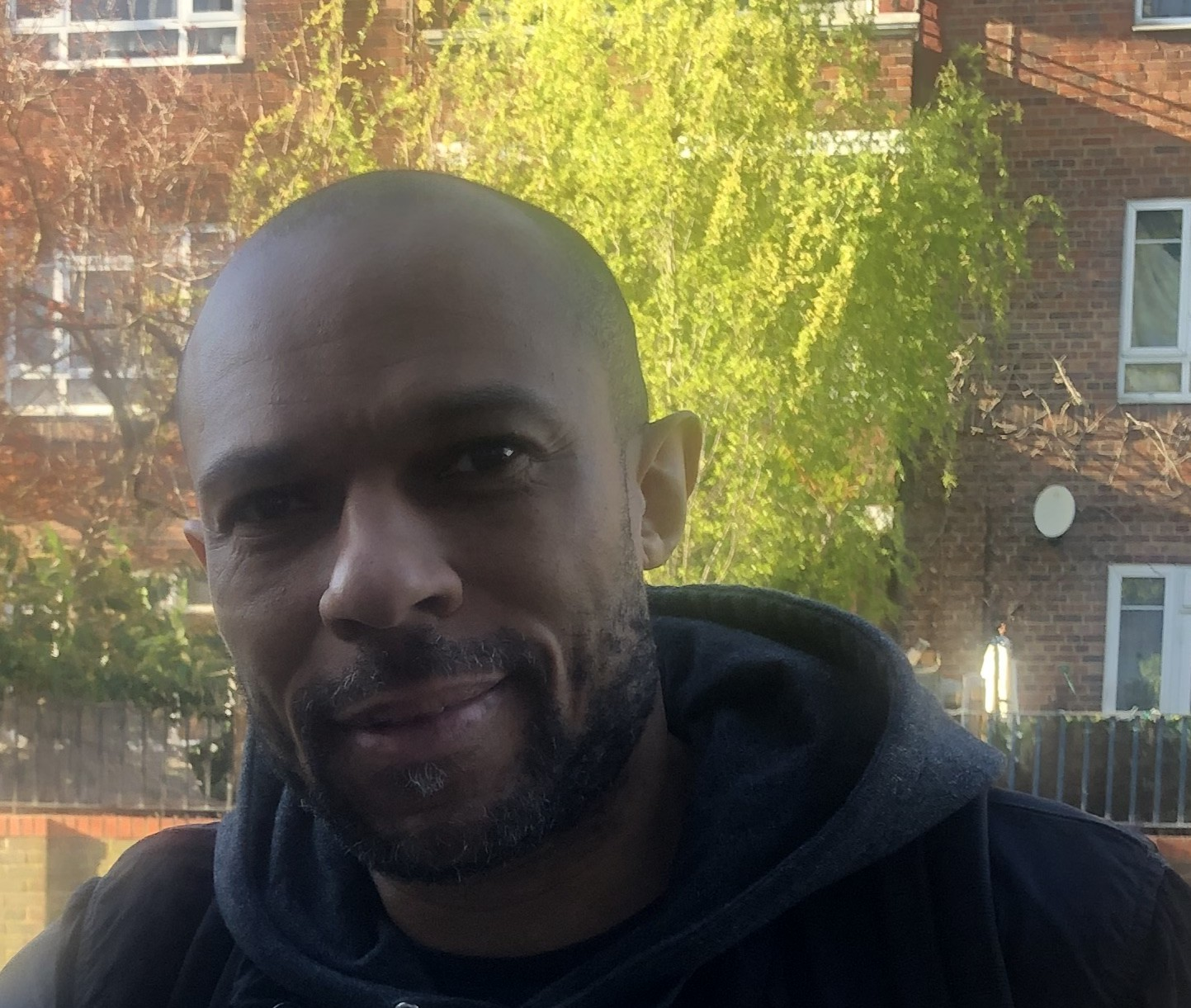
- Gabbidon in 2025.

Personal information
- Full name: Daniel Leon Gabbidon
- Date of birth: 8 August 1979 (age 47)
- Place of birth: Cwmbran, Wales
- Height: 5 ft 10 in (1.78 m)
- Position: Defender

Youth career
- Court Farm
- Cwmbrân Town
- 1996–1998: West Bromwich Albion

Senior career*
Years	Team	Apps	(Gls)
1998–2000	West Bromwich Albion	20	(0)
2000	→ Cardiff City (loan)	7	(0)
2000–2005	Cardiff City	193	(10)
2005–2011	West Ham United	96	(0)
2011–2012	Queens Park Rangers	17	(0)
2012–2014	Crystal Palace	33	(2)
2014–2015	Cardiff City	1	(0)
2015	Panteg	0	(0)
Total		366	(12)

International career
1999–2001	Wales U21	17	(0)
2002–2014	Wales	49	(0)

Managerial career
- 2014: Cardiff City (caretaker)
- * Club domestic league appearances and goals

Daniel Leon Gabbidon (born 8 August 1979) is a Welsh former professional footballer who played as a defender. He played for West Bromwich Albion, Cardiff City (two spells), West Ham United, Queens Park Rangers, Crystal Palace, and Panteg. He also played for the Wales national team.

== Club career ==
=== West Bromwich Albion ===
Born in Cwmbran, Wales, Gabbidon played youth football for local sides Court Farm and Cwmbrân Town. Gabbidon began his senior career at West Bromwich Albion, joining as an apprentice in November 1996 before turning professional in July 1998. He made his Albion début in a 1–0 home defeat against Ipswich Town on 20 March 1999 and, utilised as a right-back, he went on to make 27 appearances for West Brom in all competitions. Following the appointment of Gary Megson as manager towards the end of the 1999–2000 season, Gabbidon failed to keep his place in the team. Megson switched to a 5-3-2 formation, signing Des Lyttle to fill the right-wingback position. Gabbidon joined Cardiff City on a one-month loan at the start of the 2000–01 season.

=== Cardiff City ===
Gabbidon signed a permanent four-year deal with Cardiff City in September 2000, for a fee of up to £500,000 depending on appearances and future honours. His performances in the 2001–02 season helped Cardiff to the Division 2 play-offs, saw him make his senior international debut for Wales in March 2002 and win the Welsh clubman of the year award in October 2002. He signed an extension to his contract in April 2002, saying that it was the prospect of exciting times ahead that had persuaded him to do so. A back injury that had troubled him for some years, forced him off the pitch during a match against Barnsley in November 2002 and it was not until April 2003 that he returned to competitive action in a reserve game. He returned to the first-team in time to help Cardiff win promotion to Division 1 through the play-offs in May 2003. He missed several games at the beginning of the 2003–04 season with a heel injury but his assured performances at centre-half, and those of striker Robert Earnshaw, led club chairman, Sam Hammam, to insist in December 2003 that "Our top young players are going nowhere" in the January 2004 transfer window.

Gabbidon went on to earn a place in the First Division team of the year in April 2004. Despite speculation during 2004 that Gabbidon might leave Cardiff City, Gabbidon signed an extension to his contract in September 2004, tying him to the club until 2008. Cardiff were prepared to offer him "...the most lucrative contract ever offered to a Cardiff player", with club owner, Sam Hammam, saying, "I want to make Danny Gabbidon a cornerstone of Cardiff City FC, I see him as the absolute future of this football club personified." The 2004–05 season saw Cardiff embroiled in a relegation battle in the first half of the season, something to which Gabbidon was unaccustomed. An unbeaten run in January 2005 however saw Cardiff lift themselves five points clear of the Championship relegation zone and Gabbidon named the Championship's player of the month. A financial crisis at Cardiff at the end of the season led to Gabbidon being unsure of his future at the club and he was sold to West Ham United in July 2005 to help cut the wage bill. On 4 July 2009, he played in the first ever game at the Cardiff City Stadium, an all-stars match.

=== West Ham United ===
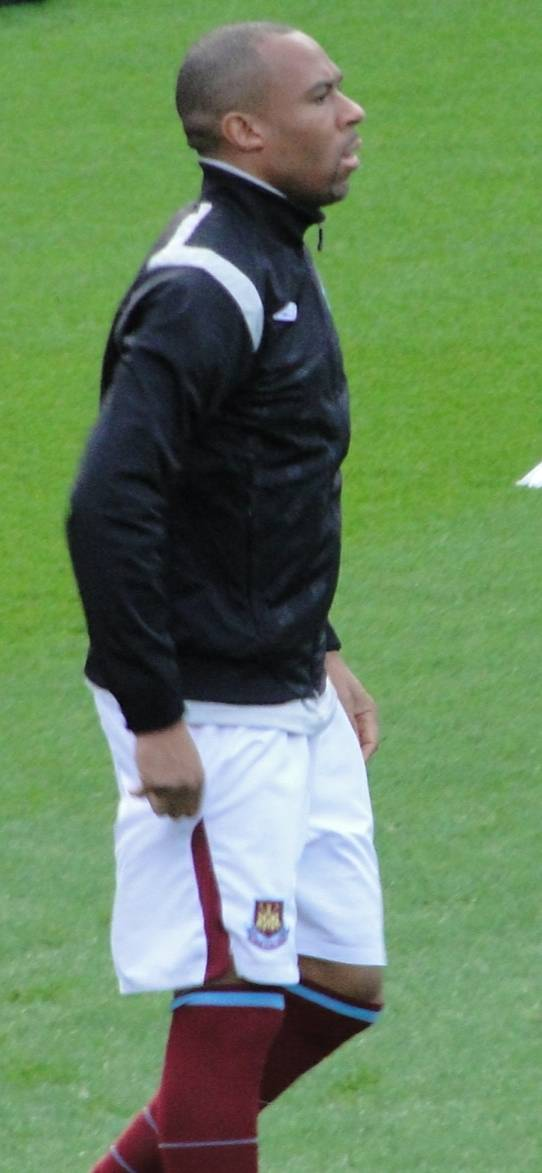
Gabbidon at West Ham United in November 2009

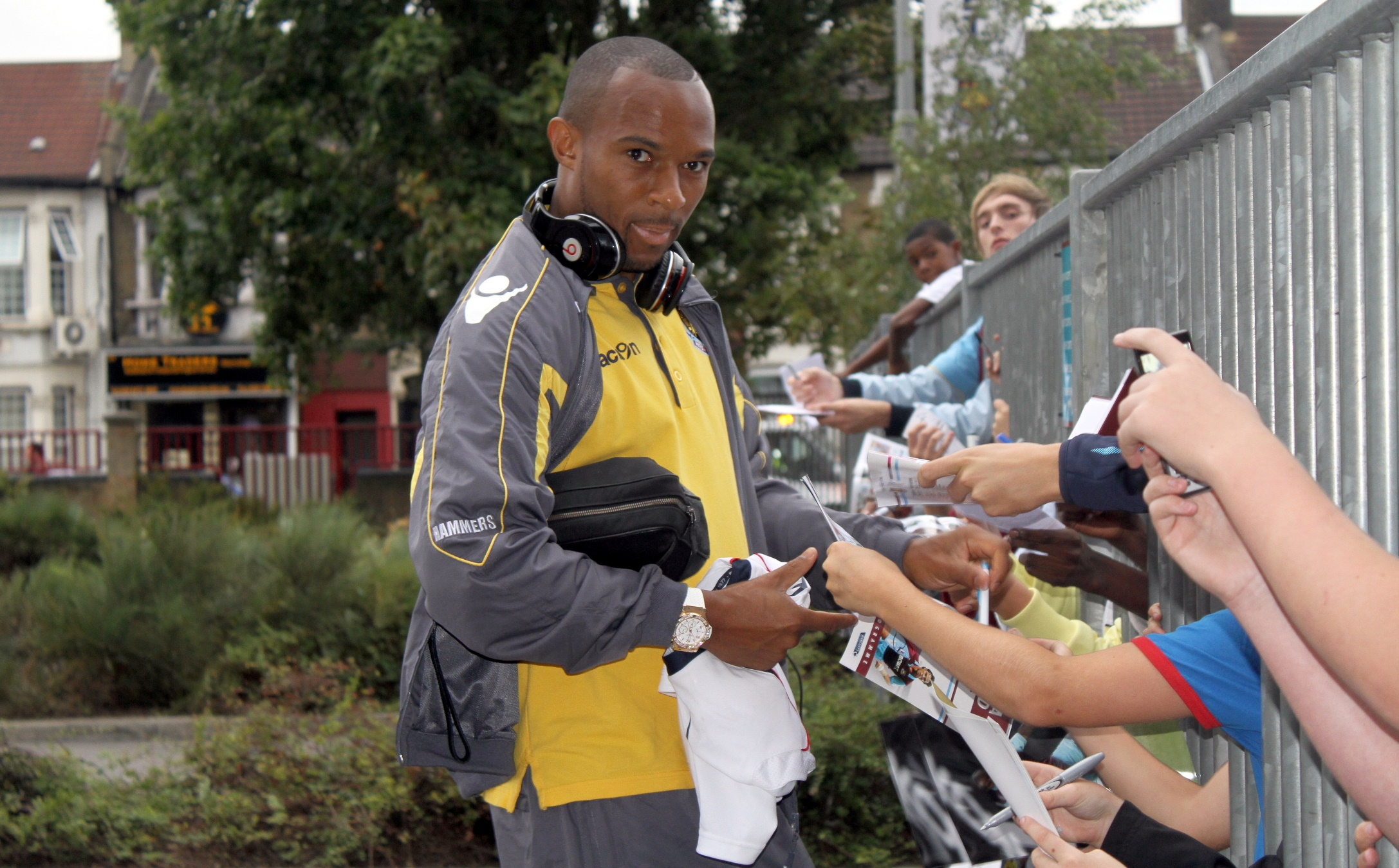
Danny Gabbidon signing autographs at Boleyn Ground, Upton Park, August 2010

Gabbidon moved to West Ham in July 2005, as part of a deal that also took fellow defender James Collins to Upton Park. His performances for his country during the year won him the Welsh Footballer of the Year award in October 2005. He established himself in central defence alongside Anton Ferdinand and helped West Ham to a mid-table position in the Premier League in the 2005–06 season and to the FA Cup final in May 2006, receiving a runners-up medal. After his performances in the 2005–06 season, he was voted 'Hammer of the Year' with Marlon Harewood named as runner-up. Gabbidon had been ever-present as West Ham struggled against relegation in the 2006–07 season, when he suffered a torn hamstring in November 2006, which sidelined him for a month. Groin injuries required surgery in January 2007 and again in April, ruling him out for the rest for the season. West Ham started the 2007–08 season with Anton Ferdinand and Matthew Upson in the centre of defence with Gabbidon as substitute.

He signed a two-year extension to his contract in August 2007, saying, "I am disappointed not to be in the side but at least the new contracts show that the club wants both me and James [Collins] around. We will both now work hard and fight to prove we are worthy of a place in the side." Injuries meant Gabbidon played no football for West Ham from December 2007 until August 2009 when he made his return in the League Cup game against Millwall. Gabbidon is one of a number of Premier League players that use Twitter to communicate with fans. In May 2011 he was fined £6,000 by the Football Association for comments he made on Twitter in April 2011 after West Ham's 2–1 home defeat by Aston Villa. He admitted a charge of improper conduct over the tweet;- "U know what, f*** the lot of you, u will never get another tweet from me again, you just don't get it do you. Bye bye". Gabbidon was released by West Ham in June 2011.

=== Queens Park Rangers ===
On 24 July 2011, Gabbidon signed a one-year contract with Queens Park Rangers (QPR) after impressing on trial with the club. He made his début on 13 August 2011, scoring an own goal in the 4–0 loss to Bolton Wanderers. On 17 January 2012, Gabbidon scored his first first-team goal since March 2005, a header from a corner in QPR's 1–0 FA Cup third round replay tie win against Milton Keynes Dons. It was his only goal for QPR as following the sacking of manager Neil Warnock. Gabbidon rarely played under new manager Mark Hughes and he was released at the end of the 2011–12 season.

=== Crystal Palace ===
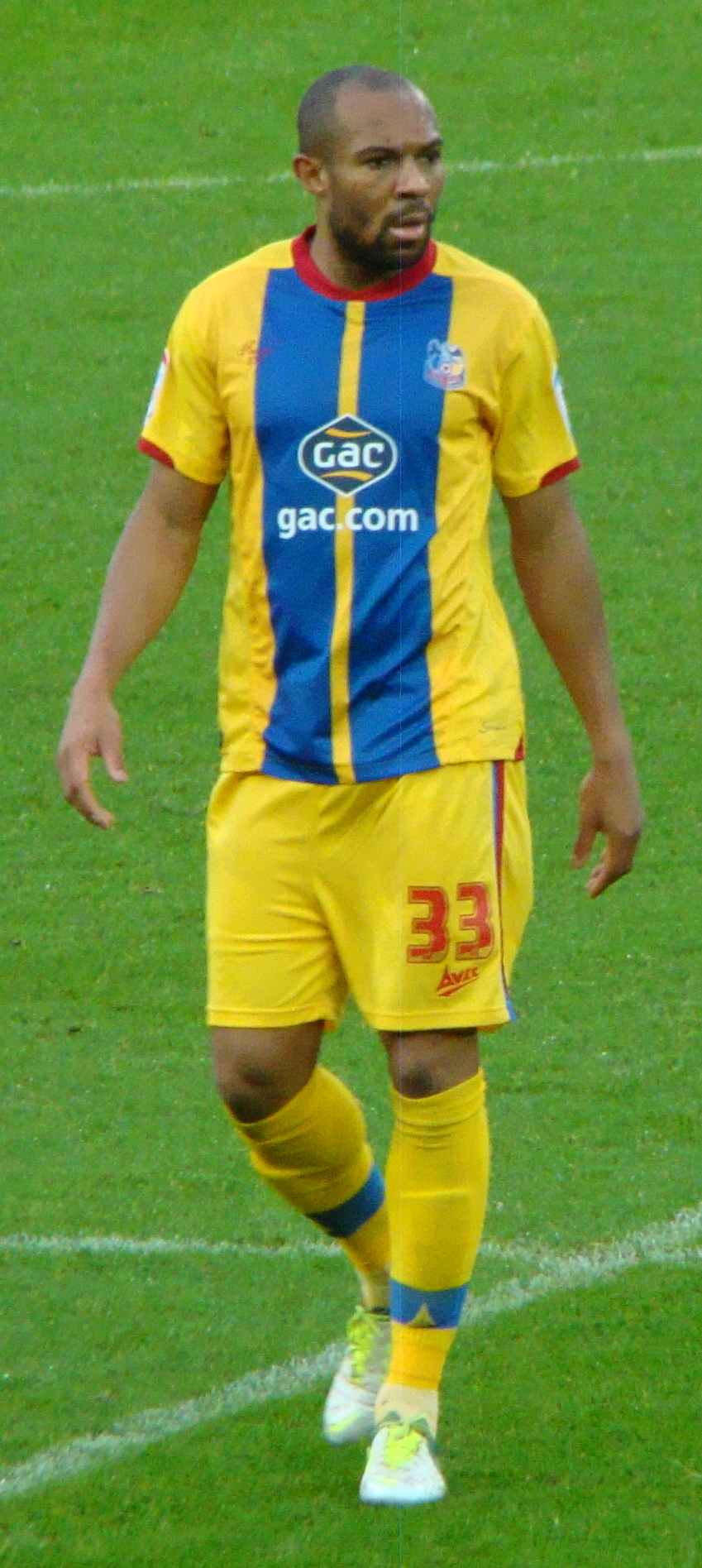
Gabbidon playing for Crystal Palace in 2012.

On 18 September 2012, Gabbidon signed for Crystal Palace. He did not make his debut until 15 December 2012 coming on in the 77th minute for André Moritz in a 2–2 away draw with Birmingham City. On 20 April 2013, against Leicester City from a Stephen Dobbie free kick, Gabbidon scored his first goal for Palace and his first league goal for eight years in a match that finished in a 2–2 draw. He would only score once more for Palace, in 3–1 home win against Sunderland on 31 August 2013. In May 2014 he was released by Crystal Palace. He had played 38 games in all competitions, scoring twice.

=== Cardiff City ===
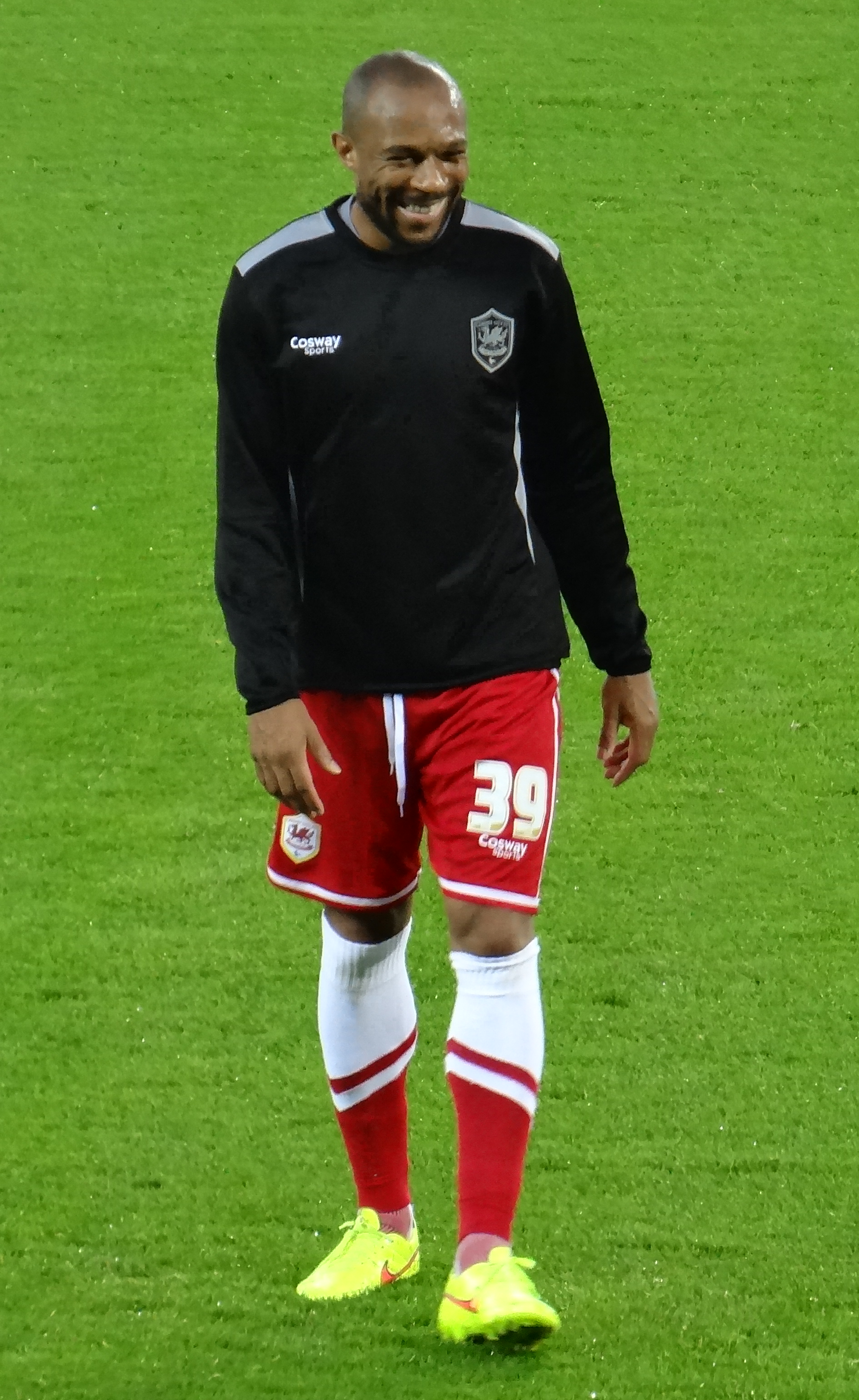
Gabbidon warming up for Cardiff City in 2014

On 1 September 2014, Gabbidon signed a one-year player/coach contract with Cardiff City. In September 2014 he was appointed as interim manager of the club following the departure of Ole Gunnar Solskjær. On 5 May 2015, it was announced that Gabbidon would be released at the end of his contract.

=== Panteg ===
In August 2015, Gabbidon joined his hometown club, Welsh Football League Division Three side Panteg, where his brother David also played. Gabbidon acted as a player-coach at the club as well as continuing his various media commitments.

== International career ==
Gabbidon was born in Wales to a Jamaican father and a Barbadian mother. Gabbidon had made 17 appearances for the Welsh Under-21 team, when an unexpected call up for the Welsh senior squad in the World Cup qualifier against Belarus in October 2001 prevented him from making his final appearance for the under 21 side. He was an unused substitute in that match and was again called into the senior squad for a friendly game against Argentina in February 2002 but it was not until the next month that he made his debut in a 0–0 home draw against the Czech Republic on 27 March 2002. He became a regular in the team despite a back problem that caused him to miss a large part of the 2002–03 season, and was part of the squad that narrowly missed out on a place at Euro 2004, losing to Russia in the play-offs, and the squad that did not qualify for the 2006 World Cup. Roy Evans, the Wales assistant coach, tipped Gabbidon to be a future captain of the national side, saying, "I see him as potential captain material even if it is not my decision. But he has all the qualities. You do not always have to be vocal, you need to lead by example." Gabbidon captained the side in place of the injured Ryan Giggs in 1–0 away defeat against Cyprus in November 2005 and again in place of Craig Bellamy in a 1–0 win against Bulgaria in August 2007.

In October 2010 Gabbidon announced his retirement from international football. However, on 6 January 2011, it was revealed that new Wales manager Gary Speed had asked Gabbidon to rethink his decision to retire from international football "He is the type of player I would like to see change his mind, I have left a couple of messages for Danny and I'm sure he'll get back to me in due course" said Speed. Wales & Celtic midfielder Joe Ledley who is also a close friend of Gabbidon, has also called for the West Ham man to return to the international fold. Ledley told his Twitter site: "I think my best mate in football Danny Gabbidon should come out of retirement and play for Wales. We need him." He was subsequently named in the squad to face the Republic of Ireland in February 2011.

== Retirement ==
Since retiring from playing Gabbidon now works in the media providing football punditry, he primarily works with BBC Radio Wales where he co-commentates on club matches for the Welsh Football clubs. He also contributes to a weekly BBC Welsh Football podcast along with comedian Elis James and fellow Welsh International Iwan Roberts.

== Career statistics ==
=== Club ===
Appearances and goals by club, season and competition
Club	Season	League			National Cup		League Cup		Continental		Total	
Club	Season	Division	Apps	Goals	Apps	Goals	Apps	Goals	Apps	Goals	Apps	Goals
West Bromwich Albion	1998–99	First Division	2	0	0	0	0	0	–		2	0
West Bromwich Albion	1999–2000	First Division	18	0	2	0	5	0	–		25	0
West Bromwich Albion	Total		20	0	2	0	5	0	0	0	27	0
Cardiff City	2000–01	Third Division	43	3	4	0	2	0	–		49	3
Cardiff City	2001–02	Second Division	44	3	4	0	1	0	–		49	3
Cardiff City	2002–03	Second Division	27	0	0	0	1	0	–		28	0
Cardiff City	2003–04	First Division	41	3	1	0	2	0	–		44	3
Cardiff City	2004–05	Championship	45	1	2	0	2	0	–		49	1
Cardiff City	Total		200	10	11	0	8	0	0	0	219	10
West Ham United	2005–06	Premier League	32	0	7	0	0	0	–		39	0
West Ham United	2006–07	Premier League	18	0	1	0	1	0	2	0	22	0
West Ham United	2007–08	Premier League	10	0	0	0	4	0	–		14	0
West Ham United	2008–09	Premier League	0	0	0	0	0	0	–		0	0
West Ham United	2009–10	Premier League	10	0	0	0	1	0	–		11	0
West Ham United	2010–11	Premier League	26	0	1	0	0	0	–		27	0
West Ham United	Total		96	0	9	0	6	0	2	0	113	0
Queens Park Rangers	2011–12	Premier League	17	0	1	1	0	0	–		18	1
Crystal Palace	2012–13	Championship	9	1	1	0	0	0	–		10	1
Crystal Palace	2013–14	Premier League	24	1	1	0	0	0	–		25	1
Crystal Palace	Total		33	2	2	0	0	0	0	0	35	2
Cardiff City	2014–15	Championship	1	0	0	0	1	0	–		2	0
Career total			367	12	25	1	20	0	2	0	414	13

=== International ===
Appearances and goals by national team and year
National team	Year	Apps	Goals
Wales	2002	4	0
Wales	2003	4	0
Wales	2004	8	0
Wales	2005	8	0
Wales	2006	7	0
Wales	2007	9	0
Wales	2008	0	0
Wales	2009	3	0
Wales	2010	0	0
Wales	2011	2	0
Wales	2012	1	0
Wales	2013	1	0
Wales	2014	2	0
Total		49	0

== Managerial statistics ==
As of 6 October 2014

Managerial record by team and tenure
Team	From	To	Record				
Team	From	To	P	W	D	L	Win %
Cardiff City	18 September 2014	6 October 2014	5	1	2	2	20.0
Total			5	1	2	2	20.0

== Honours ==
Cardiff City

- Football League Second Division play-offs: 2003

West Ham United

- FA Cup runner-up: 2005–06

Crystal Palace

- Football League Championship play-offs: 2013

Individual

- Welsh Footballer of the Year: 2005
- PFA Team of the Year: 2003–04 First Division
