= Trofeo Bortolotti =

- Organiser(s): Atalanta B.C.
- Founded: 1992
- Region: Bergamo, Italy
- Teams: 2–3
- Most championships: Atalanta (17 titles)

The Trofeo Achille e Cesare Bortolotti, best known as Trofeo Bortolotti (English: Bortolotti Trophy), is a friendly tournament organized by Atalanta B.C.

== History ==
The tournament is organized in memory of Atalanta presidents Achille Bortolotti and Cesare Bortolotti. Generally, the matches is played a team in a 90-minute match at the Stadio Atleti Azzurri d'Italia and in the event of a tie it goes to a penalty shootout. In four editions, the Trophy has been awarded after a triangular match with matches of 45 minutes each, with the possibility of penalties in the event of a draw. The Trophy has been held annually since 1992, with the exceptions of 1999, 2005, 2019, 2020 and 2021 where it has not been held.

== List of champions ==
Following is the list with all the champions of the Trofeo Bortolotti:

Season	Champions	Runners-up	Third place
1992	(Italy) Atalanta	(Germany) Borussia Dortmund	(Italy) Juventus
1993	(Italy) Atalanta	(France) Marseille	—N/a
1994	(Italy) Atalanta	(Brazil) Novorizontino	—N/a
1995	(Brazil) São Paulo	(Italy) Atalanta	—N/a
1996	(Italy) Atalanta	(Italy) S.C. Leffe	(Italy) Alzano
1997	(Brazil) Vasco da Gama	(Italy) Padova	(Italy) Atalanta
1998	(Italy) Sampdoria	(Italy) Atalanta	—N/a
1999	Not held		
2000	(Italy) Atalanta	(Italy) Milan	—N/a
2001	(Italy) Atalanta	(Germany) Borussia Dortmund	—N/a
2002	(Italy) Atalanta	(Spain) Real Sociedad	—N/a
2003	(Italy) Atalanta	(Italy) Udinese	—N/a
2004	(Italy) Atalanta	(Italy) Sampdoria	—N/a
2005	Not held		
2006	(Italy) Sampdoria	(Italy) Atalanta	—N/a
2007	(Italy) Atalanta	(Belgium) Mechelen	—N/a
2008	(Italy) Atalanta	(Sweden) IFK Göteborg	—N/a
2009	(Italy) Atalanta	(England) Hull City	—N/a
2010	(Spain) Sevilla	(Italy) Atalanta	—N/a
2011	(England) Queens Park Rangers	(Portugal) Braga	(Italy) Atalanta
2012	(Italy) Atalanta	(Italy) Udinese	—N/a
2013	(Italy) Atalanta	(Italy) Udinese	—N/a
2014	(Italy) Atalanta	(France) Nantes	—N/a
2015	(Ukraine) Shakhtar	(Italy) Atalanta	—N/a
2016	(Germany) Eintracht Frankfurt	(Italy) Atalanta	—N/a
2017	(Italy) Atalanta	(France) Lille	—N/a
2018	(Italy) Atalanta	(Germany) Hertha Berlin	—N/a
2019–2021	Not held		
2022	(Germany) Eintracht Frankfurt	(Italy) Atalanta	—N/a
2023–2024	Not held		
2025	(Italy) Juventus	(Italy) Atalanta	—N/a

=== Total ===
Club	Winners	Runners-up
(Italy) Atalanta	17	7
(Italy) Sampdoria	2	1
(Germany) Eintracht Frankfurt	2	0
(England) Queens Park Rangers	1	0
(Brazil) São Paulo	1	0
(Ukraine) Shakhtar	1	0
(Spain) Sevilla	1	0
(Brazil) Vasco da Gama	1	0
(Italy) Juventus	1	0
