= Anton Ferdinand =

English former footballer (born 1985)

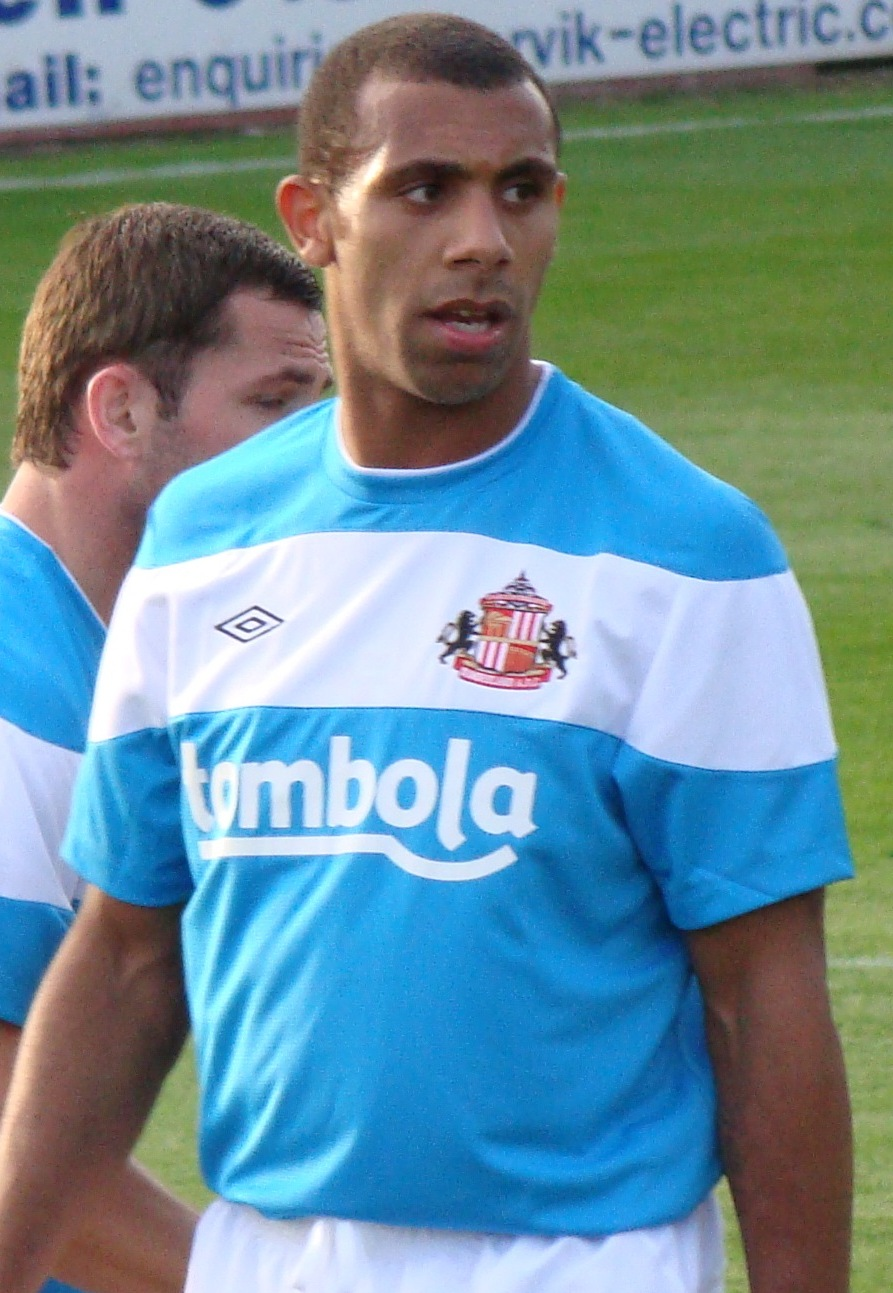
- Ferdinand playing for Sunderland in 2011

Personal information
- Full name: Anton Julian Ferdinand
- Date of birth: 18 February 1985 (age 41)
- Place of birth: Peckham, England
- Height: 6 ft 0 in (1.83 m)
- Position: Centre back

Team information
- Current team: Hornchurch (first-team coach)

Youth career
- 1994–2003: West Ham United

Senior career*
Years	Team	Apps	(Gls)
2003–2008	West Ham United	138	(5)
2008–2011	Sunderland	85	(0)
2011–2013	Queens Park Rangers	44	(0)
2013	→ Bursaspor (loan)	7	(0)
2013–2014	Antalyaspor	3	(0)
2014	Police United	0	(0)
2014–2016	Reading	21	(0)
2016–2018	Southend United	65	(2)
2018–2019	St Mirren	18	(0)
Total		381	(7)

International career
2003	England U18	2	(0)
2005	England U20	4	(0)
2004–2007	England U21	17	(0)
Medal record
England
UEFA European U-21 Championship
Bronze medal – third place	2007 Netherlands
- * Club domestic league appearances and goals

Anton Julian Ferdinand (born 18 February 1985) is an English professional football coach and former player who played as a centre back. He is a first-team coach at National League club Hornchurch.

A product of the West Ham United academy, he also played for their senior team, Queens Park Rangers, Sunderland, Bursaspor, Antalyaspor and Reading. He has also represented England at under-21 level. Ferdinand retired from playing in July 2019.

== Background ==
Ferdinand was born in Peckham, Greater London, to Janice Lavender from Ireland and Julian Ferdinand from Saint Lucia. His brother, Rio, played for West Ham United and Manchester United, and is a former captain of the England national football team; and his cousin, Les, is a former England international. Anton showed considerable talent from an early age. Like his brother, Rio, he preferred to play in defence. His ability in this position led to him being signed to West Ham United's academy.

== Club career ==
=== West Ham United ===
Ferdinand joined West Ham aged nine later signing a three-year professional contract in the summer of 2002. He was handed his first team debut, by manager Glenn Roeder, in August 2003 when he started the 2–1 victory at Preston North End on the 2003–04 season's opening day. He went on to feature in 26 games that season.

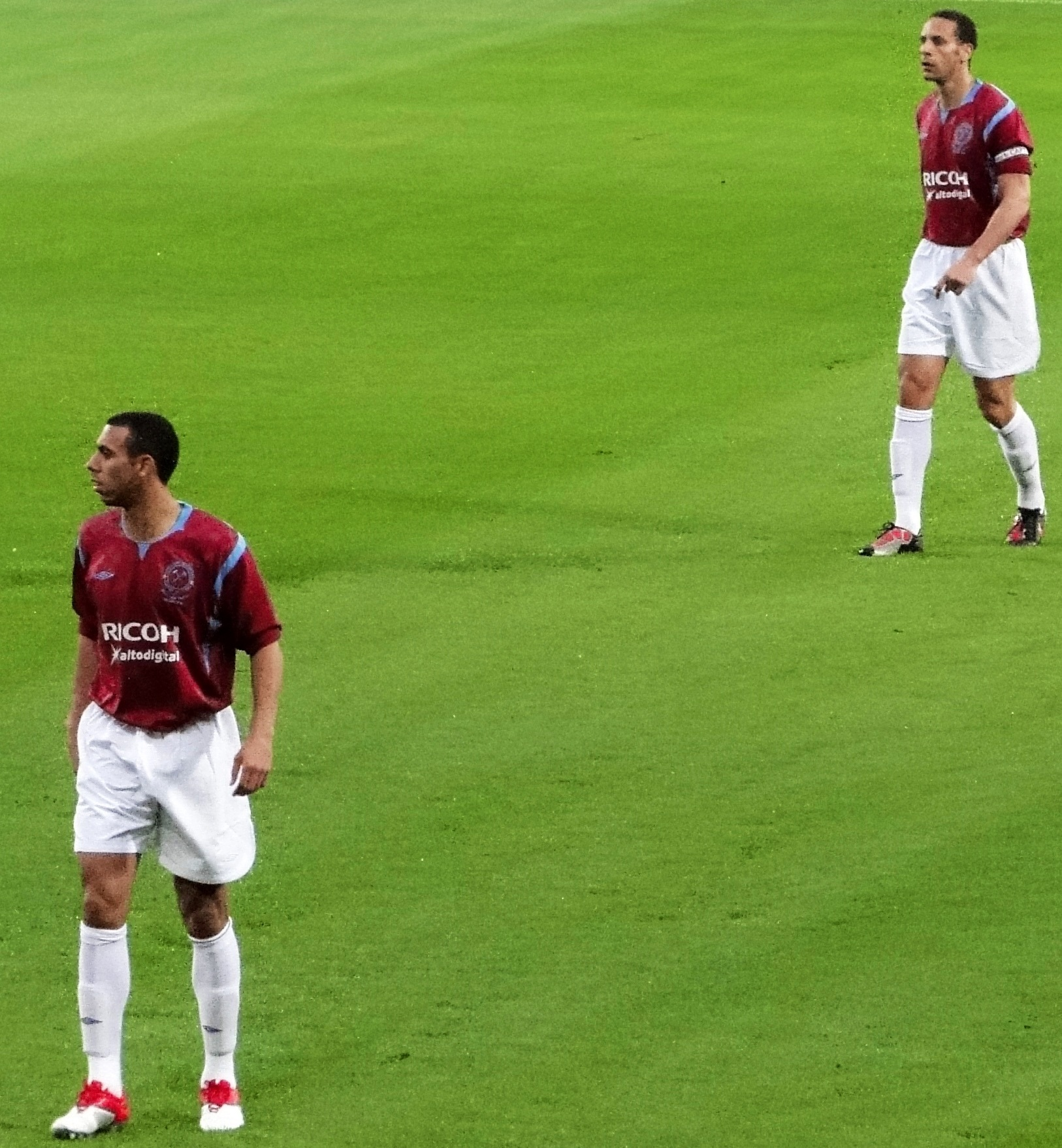
Anton with brother Rio in Tony Carr's testimonial match

In the 2004–05 season, he cemented his first team place with several key performances including scoring the opening goal, and his first for West Ham, on the final day of the season as West Ham beat Watford 2–1 at Vicarage Road to make the play-offs. In the Final Ferdinand was a member of the team which beat Preston 1–0, earning them promotion back into the Premier League after an absence of two years. At the end of July 2005, Ferdinand signed a three-year contract extension with the club.

Ferdinand won the Premier League Player of the Month award in January 2006, following his brother Rio to become the first brothers to win the award. In the 2006 FA Cup Final against Liverpool in Cardiff, Ferdinand fell to his knees after missing the decisive penalty in the shoot out. During the 2005–06 season, Ferdinand was linked with reigning Spanish champions FC Barcelona.

In March 2007 it was revealed that Ferdinand had been fined two weeks' wages (estimated at £45,000) for lying about his whereabouts. Ferdinand told the club he needed to go to the Isle of Wight to visit his grandmother when in fact, he went to South Carolina to celebrate his 22nd birthday. West Ham lost the following game to relegation rivals Charlton Athletic 0–4. His last goal for West Ham was against Fulham on 12 January 2008, scoring in the 69th minute to put West Ham 2–1 ahead, which proved to be the winning goal.

=== Sunderland ===
On 27 August 2008, Ferdinand signed for Sunderland for an undisclosed fee on a four-year deal. Sunderland manager Roy Keane also stated after the signing of Ferdinand that he viewed him as a future England International. Ferdinand made a promising start to his Sunderland career in a partnership formed with Danny Collins but Sunderland's poor results at the start of the 2008–09 season saw Keane experiment with several different back four line-ups resulting in Ferdinand being in and out of the side. Following captain Dean Whitehead's departure to Stoke City in July 2009, Nyron Nosworthy took Whitehead's vacated number 6 jersey and Ferdinand switched from number 26 to number 5. Ferdinand fell out of favour with new manager Steve Bruce and first team opportunities became limited and he was not initially given a squad number for the 2010–11 Premier League season as loan-signing John Mensah was given Ferdinand's number 5 shirt, but was later given number 29.

=== Queens Park Rangers ===
On 31 August 2011, Sunderland accepted a bid from Queens Park Rangers for Ferdinand. The transfer was confirmed on 1 September. He made his debut on 12 September, playing the full 90 minutes, alongside Danny Gabbidon in a 0–0 draw with Newcastle United at Loftus Road. On 23 October, in a match between QPR and Chelsea, Ferdinand alleged racial abuse by Chelsea captain, John Terry, claiming Terry called him a "fucking black cunt" during the game; a claim denied by Terry. On 1 November, the Metropolitan Police announced a formal investigation into the allegations. On 1 February 2012 at Westminster Magistrates' Court, Terry was accused of a racially aggravated public order offence in relation to the game at Loftus Road on 23 October. He entered a not-guilty plea and stood trial on 9 July. On 13 July, following a four-day trial, Terry was acquitted. In July, following the court hearing Terry was charged by The Football Association with "using abusive and/or insulting words and/or behaviour towards Ferdinand and which included a reference to colour and/or race contrary to FA Rule E3[2]". In September 2012, following a four-day hearing, he was found guilty, banned for four games and fined £220,000. On 9 August 2013, Ferdinand was released by Queens Park Rangers in an effort to cut costs, the club having been relegated to the Championship.

==== Loan to Bursaspor ====
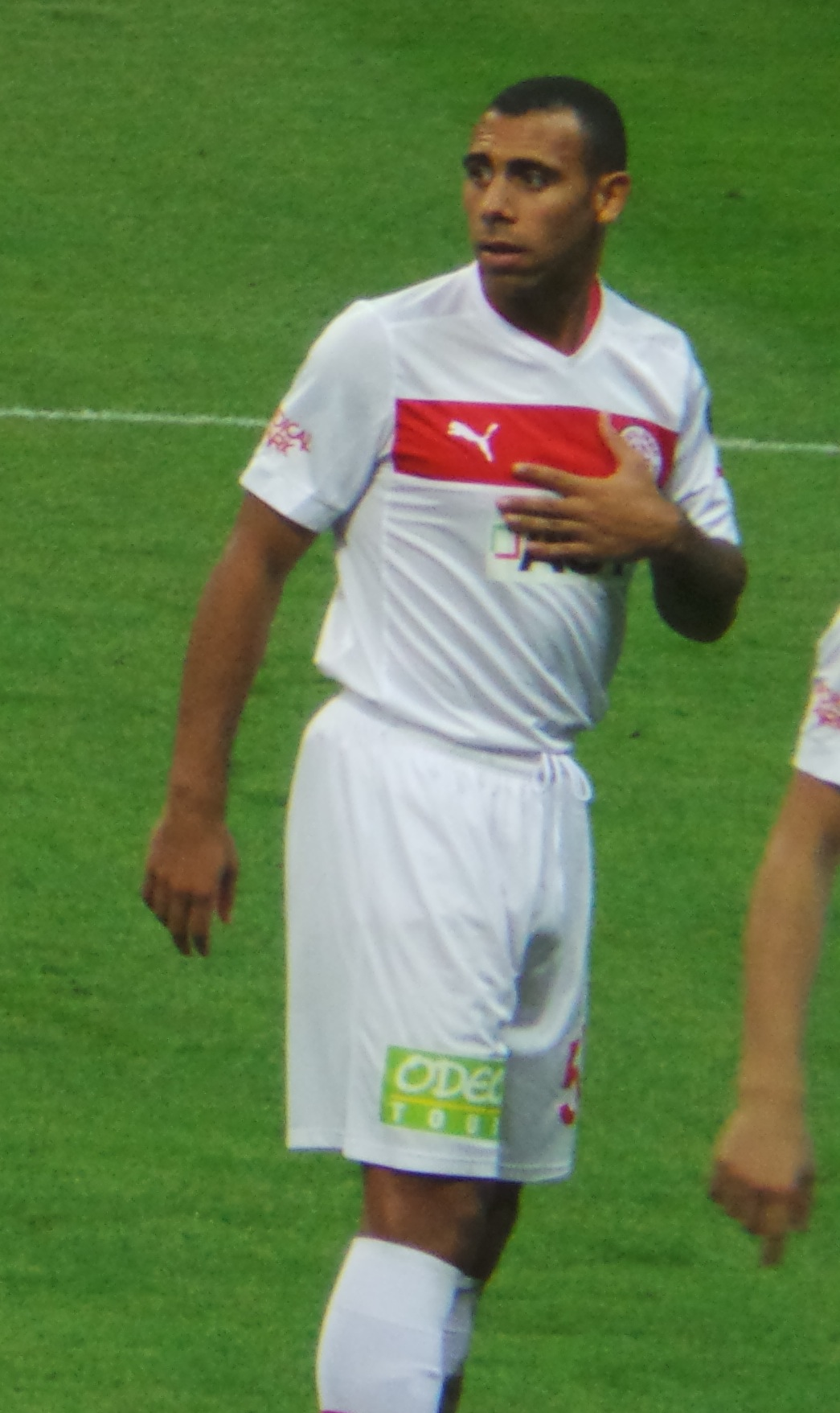
Ferdinand playing for Antalyaspor in 2013

In January 2013, after struggling for a first-team place with QPR, Ferdinand joined Turkish club Bursaspor on loan until the end of the season. Ferdinand played seven games for Bursaspor helping them to fourth place in the 2012–13 Super League and a qualifying position in the 2013–14 Europa League.

=== Antalyaspor ===
On 14 August 2013, Ferdinand signed for Turkish team Antalyaspor on a three-year contract. At the end of the 2013–14 season he was released by the club.

=== Police United ===
Ferdinand was heavily linked with a move to Police United of the Thai Premier League during the summer of 2014. The next week, he arrived in Bangkok to sign for Police United on 18 June 2014. He and Teeratep Winothai were unveiled as new Police United signings in a press conference on 20 June and he said former QPR teammate Jay Bothroyd, who played for Muangthong United, convinced him to move to Thailand. The BBC later reported that the move had fallen through and that Ferdinand was in advanced negotiations with Championship side Reading with the CEO of Police United, Samrit Bunditkitsada, being part of a consortium which bought a 90% stake in the English club in July.

=== Reading ===
On 11 August 2014, Ferdinand signed a two-year deal with Reading on a free transfer. Ferdinand did not make his Reading debut until 4 November 2014. He had been side-lined with a hamstring injury but played the first half in a 3–0 home win against Rotherham United. Reading announced on 9 May 2016, that Ferdinand would leave Reading when his contract expired at the end of June 2016.

=== Southend United ===
On 27 August 2016, Ferdinand signed for Southend United on a one-year deal. On 9 August 2017, Ferdinand signed a new two-year contract to stay at Southend United. At the end of the 2017–18 season he was transfer listed by the club. On 31 August 2018, he left the club by mutual consent and became a free agent.

=== St Mirren ===
On 14 September 2018, he joined Scottish Premiership side St Mirren. In January 2019, Ferdinand signed a contract extension with St Mirren – keeping him at the club until the end of the season. In May 2019, Ferdinand confirmed that he was leaving Saints at the end of his contract. It was confirmed he retired from professional football in July 2019.

== International career ==
In January 2003, before he'd made his senior debut for West Ham, Ferdinand was tipped by BBC Sport to be called up for the England squad for UEFA Euro 2008 - a tournament that England ultimately failed to qualify for.

Ferdinand was a regular selection for England's under-21 side, having made his début in a 3–1 win over Ukraine at the Riverside Stadium on 17 August 2004.

Ferdinand was selected to be part of the England squad for the 2007 UEFA European Under-21 Championship in the Netherlands, and given the number 5 shirt. Going into the tournament whilst recovering from an injury, he made only one appearance off the bench in the semi-final against the hosts. The match finished 1–1 after extra time and in the resulting penalty shootout, he missed the decisive kick as England lost by a record 13–12 score. This was his final U21 appearance.

Ferdinand is also eligible to play for the Republic of Ireland national team through his mother and Saint Lucia through his father.

== Coaching career ==
On 26 June 2026, Ferdinand was appointed as a first-team coach at newly promoted National League club Hornchurch.

== Outside of football ==
Since retirement, Ferdinand has appeared as a pundit on Talksport. In 2025, Ferdinand appeared as a contestant on the seventeenth series of Dancing on Ice, finishing in third place behind Michaela Strachan and Sam Aston.

== Personal life ==
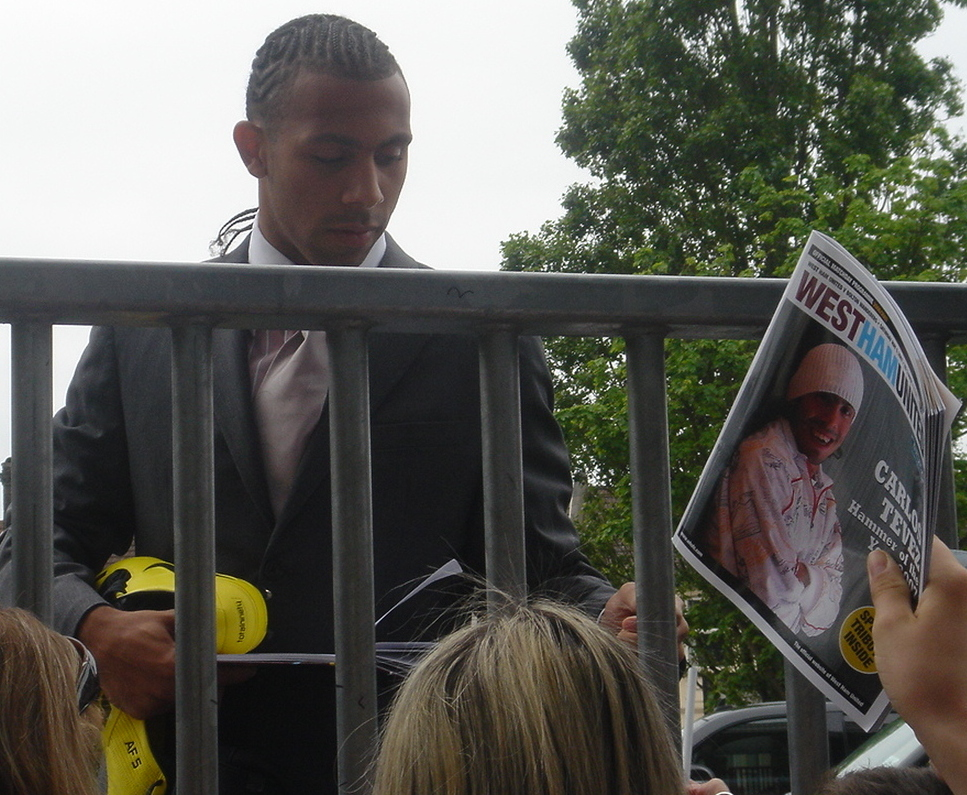
Anton Ferdinand signing autographs

Ferdinand is a Christian. He is the brother of former Manchester United defender Rio Ferdinand, as well as the cousin of both Les Ferdinand, a former Queens Park Rangers and Kane Ferdinand, a midfielder for Maidenhead United.

=== Court case ===
In October 2006, Ferdinand was arrested on assault charges following a fracas outside a nightclub in Ilford. He was charged in November 2006. He appeared at Snaresbrook Crown Court on 12 November 2007 charged with assault occasioning actual bodily harm and affray, arising from this incident. It was alleged that Ferdinand had punched Emile Walker. In his defence, Ferdinand said he had feared he was going to be robbed of his £64,000 watch and was defending himself. On 20 November 2007, Ferdinand was acquitted as the jury accepted he was acting in self-defence.

=== Charity work ===
Ferdinand is an Athlete Ambassador for the charity Right To Play.

=== Racial abuse ===
On 2 November 2011, John Terry was placed under police investigation following an allegation of racist abuse made at Ferdinand during a match versus Queens Park Rangers. Video footage circulated on the internet led to accusations that Terry called Ferdinand a "fucking black cunt." In response to the video footage, Terry claimed that he was actually asking Ferdinand, "Oi, Anton, do you think I called you a black cunt?" On 25 November 2011, Terry was interviewed under caution by the police. On 21 December 2011, he was charged with using racist language by the Crown Prosecution Service. On 3 February 2012, the Football Association stripped Terry of his England captaincy for the second time, stating that Terry would not captain the national team until the racial abuse allegations against him were resolved.

When the trial began in July 2012, Terry entered a not guilty plea and was acquitted of the charge on 13 July 2012. The court established that neither Ferdinand nor anyone else had heard Terry's words, but Terry himself admitted that he had directed the words "fucking black cunt" and "fucking knobhead" at Ferdinand, which was affirmed by two expert lip readers from video evidence. Terry maintained that he used the words as a form of sarcasm and that he was questioning what he thought had been an allegation of racism from Ferdinand; neither lip reader was able to "identify whether the statement was made as a question or in what type of voice it was said." Chief Magistrate Riddle concluded that while there was no doubt Terry had uttered those words in anger, "it is impossible to be sure exactly what were the words spoken by [Terry] at the relevant time" and that there was a lack of evidence to prove beyond a doubt that Terry had used them as an insult instead of "a challenge to what he believed had been said to him." The court therefore found Terry not guilty.

On 27 July 2012, the FA charged Terry for using "abusive and/or insulting words and/or behaviour" which "included a reference to the ethnic origin and/or colour and/or race of Ferdinand." The FA had delayed the charge until after the conclusion of Terry's criminal trial. Terry denied the charge. On the eve of the FA's hearing, Terry announced his retirement from the England national football team, saying his position had become "untenable" due to the disciplinary charge. On 27 September 2012, the hearing concluded with Terry being found guilty; he was punished with a four-match ban and a £220,000 fine.

The FA published a 63-page report regarding the disciplinary proceedings conducted by an Independent Regulatory Commission; it labelled aspects of Terry's defence as "improbable, implausible and contrived," finding it "inherently unlikely that if he had been accused by Mr. Ferdinand of calling him something that ended with the words "black cunt", that Mr. Terry would have added the word "fucking" when he threw the words back, if he was genuinely doing so by way of forceful denial" and "inherently improbable" that he would call Anton Ferdinand a "fucking knobhead" for falsely accusing him of racial abuse. The Commission found it "implausible" that to robustly deny having used the words "black cunt" he "simply repeated" them. His defence in court was not that he had "simply repeated" the words but that he had "sarcastically" repeated them (see above); however, there was no reference to sarcasm in the Regulatory Commission's 63-page written report. The Commission concluded that it was "quite satisfied, on the balance of probabilities, that there [was] no credible basis for Mr. Terry's defence that his use of the words 'fucking black cunt' were directed at Ferdinand by way of forceful rejection and/or inquiry. Instead, [the Commission was] quite satisfied, and [found] on the balance of probabilities, that the offending words were said by way of insult."

The FA commission was also criticised as a "kangaroo court" and the FA for its lack of independence, for failing to disclose all evidence to the police, failing to tape record their interview with key witness Ashley Cole, for lowering the required burden of proof after the incident had taken place, and for punishing Terry for an offence he had already been cleared of in a criminal court, in contravention of its own rules, which state that verdicts in criminal cases are "presumed to be correct" unless "clear and convincing evidence" to the contrary emerges. Terry's four-match ban was contrasted with Luis Suárez's eight-match ban for racially abusing Patrice Evra (Suárez received a longer ban for using the insults repeatedly) and a 14-year-old schoolboy's five-match ban for telling a referee his name was Santa Claus.

On 18 October 2012, Terry decided not to appeal against the verdict and his four-match ban. He issued an apology for "the language [he] used in the game" and stated that it was "not acceptable on the football field or indeed in any walk of life." Chelsea announced that they had taken further disciplinary action against Terry while keeping the details confidential. However, Terry and Chelsea still faced media condemnation; Terry was criticised for not directly and personally apologising to Ferdinand, while Chelsea were accused of hypocrisy and double standards by only fining Terry and not stripping him of his captaincy when they have a "zero-tolerance" approach to racism and had previously handed a life ban to a fan who racially abused former Chelsea player Didier Drogba. In a radio interview, Chelsea chairman Bruce Buck and chief executive Ron Gourlay called the incident a "lapse of judgement" and "out of character" from Terry and stated that the club had "taken firm disciplinary action appropriate to the circumstances," adding that "we must not forget he was cleared in a court of law."

In November 2020, the BBC broadcast Anton Ferdinand: Football, Racism and Me, a programme looking at racism and the incident with Terry in 2011. While promoting the programme on Instagram, Ferdinand received racist abuse by being sent monkey and banana emojis.

== Career statistics ==
As of match played 26 May 2019

Appearances and goals by club, season and competition
Club	Season	League			National Cup		League Cup		Continental		Other		Total	
Club	Season	Division	Apps	Goals	Apps	Goals	Apps	Goals	Apps	Goals	Apps	Goals	Apps	Goals
West Ham United	2003–04	First Division	20	0	3	0	3	0	–		–		26	0
West Ham United	2004–05	Championship	29	1	3	0	1	0	–		3 (Note: Appearances in Championship play-offs)	0	36	1
West Ham United	2005–06	Premier League	33	2	5	0	0	0	–		–		38	2
West Ham United	2006–07	Premier League	31	0	1	0	1	0	1 (Note: Appearance in UEFA Cup)	0	–		34	0
West Ham United	2007–08	Premier League	25	2	2	0	2	0	–		–		29	2
West Ham United	Total		138	5	14	0	7	0	1	0	3	0	163	5
Sunderland	2008–09	Premier League	31	0	3	0	2	0	–		–		36	0
Sunderland	2009–10	Premier League	24	0	0	0	1	0	–		–		25	0
Sunderland	2010–11	Premier League	27	0	1	0	2	0	–		–		30	0
Sunderland	2011–12	Premier League	3	0	0	0	1	0	–		–		4	0
Sunderland	Total		85	0	4	0	6	0	0	0	0	0	95	0
Queens Park Rangers	2011–12	Premier League	31	0	2	0	0	0	–		–		33	0
Queens Park Rangers	2012–13	Premier League	13	0	2	0	1	0	–		–		16	0
Queens Park Rangers	Total		44	0	4	0	1	0	0	0	0	0	49	0
Bursaspor (loan)	2012–13	Süper Lig	7	0	1	0	–		–		–		8	0
Antalyaspor	2013–14	Süper Lig	3	0	3	0	–		–		–		6	0
Reading	2014–15	Championship	2	0	0	0	0	0	–		–		2	0
Reading	2015–16	Championship	19	0	3	0	2	0	–		–		24	0
Reading	Total		21	0	3	0	2	0	0	0	0	0	26	0
Southend United	2016–17	League One	34	2	0	0	0	0	–		2 (Note: Appearances in EFL Trophy)	0	36	2
Southend United	2017–18	League One	31	0	1	0	0	0	–		3	0	35	0
Southend United	Total		65	2	1	0	0	0	–		5	0	71	2
St Mirren	2018–19	Scottish Premiership	18	0	0	0	0	0	–		1	0	19	0
Career total			381	7	30	0	16	0	1	0	9	0	437	7

== Honours ==
West Ham United

- Football League Championship play-offs: 2005
- FA Cup runner-up: 2005–06

Individual

- Premier League Player of the Month: January 2006
