= Matt Reed (footballer) =

English footballer

Personal information
- Full name: Matthew James Reed
- Date of birth: 24 December 1986 (age 39)
- Place of birth: Dartford, England
- Height: 6 ft 1 in (1.85 m)
- Position: Goalkeeper

Youth career
- West Ham United

Senior career*
Years	Team	Apps	(Gls)
2005–2006	West Ham United	0	(0)
2006	→ Barnet (loan)	4	(0)
2006	Bristol City	0	(0)
2006–2007	Walton Casuals	38	(0)
2007–2008	Tonbridge Angels		
2008–2009	Sittingbourne		
2009	Carshalton		
2009–2010	Margate		
2010	Dartford	0	(0)
2010–2011	Sittingbourne	40	(0)
2011	Metropolitan Police		
2011–2012	Sittingbourne		
2012–2013	Leatherhead	12	(0)
- * Club domestic league appearances and goals

Matthew James Reed (born 24 December 1986) is an English former footballer who played as a goalkeeper.

== Career ==
Reed began his career at West Ham United, playing for the club as a youth team player. In January 2006, Reed was loaned out to League Two club Barnet, making four appearances for the club during his time on loan.

Following his release from West Ham, Reed joined Bristol City, before leaving the club in September 2006. Following his spell at Bristol City, Reed joined Walton Casuals for the remainder of the season. In 2007, Reed signed for Tonbridge Angels, making 58 appearances in all competitions, before joining Sittingbourne the following year. In 2009, Reed briefly joined Carshalton, before signing for Margate in November 2009. After departing Margate in February 2010, Reed signed for Dartford as back-up. In the summer of 2010, Reed re-signed for Sittingbourne, making 40 league appearances in his second spell at the club. The following summer, Reed signed for Metropolitan Police, before rejoining Sittingbourne for a third spell in September 2011. In 2012, Reed signed for Leatherhead, making 12 league appearances throughout the 2012–13 season.
