= 2013 Guadiana Trophy =

Tournament details
- Host country: Portugal
- Dates: 5–7 August 2013
- Teams: 3
- Venue(s): Municipal de Portimão

Final positions
- Champions: (Portugal) Braga (1st title)
- Runners-up: (England) West Ham United
- Third place: (Portugal) Sporting CP

Tournament statistics
- Matches played: 3
- Goals scored: 7 (2.33 per match)
- Top scorer(s): 2 – Ravel Morrison (West Ham United)
- Best player(s): Edinho (Braga)

The 2013 Guadiana Trophy was the 13th edition of the competition and took place between 5 and 7 August 2013. It featured Sporting CP, West Ham United and Braga.

Braga won its first Guadiana Trophy by winning both of its matches in the competition by a score of 1–0.

== Standings ==
Team	Pld	W	D	L	GF	GA	GD	Pts
(Portugal) Braga	2	2	0	0	2	0	+2	6
(England) West Ham United	2	1	0	1	3	3	0	3
(Portugal) Sporting CP	2	0	0	2	2	4	-2	0

== Matches ==
=== Day 1 ===
2013-08-05
21:15

Sporting CP (Portugal)	2 – 3	(England) West Ham United
Capel 45+3' (pen.); Evaldo 84'	Report	Nolan 58'; Morrison 59', 79'
Penalties
Carvalho (penalty scored); Eduardo (penalty scored); Chaby (penalty scored); Maurício (penalty scored); Rojo (penalty missed)	4 – 4	Noble (penalty scored); Morisson (penalty missed); Lletget (penalty scored); Jarvis (penalty scored); J. Cole (penalty scored)

Municipal de Portimão, Portimão
Referee: Ricardo Martins

=== Day 2 ===
2013-08-06
21:15

(Portugal) Braga	1 – 0	(England) West Ham United
Silva 63'	Report
Penalties
Santos (penalty missed); Paulo Vinícius (penalty missed); Alan (penalty scored); Agra (penalty scored); Edinho (penalty scored)	3 – 3	Nolan (penalty scored); Vaz Tê (penalty scored); Collison (penalty scored); Ruddock (penalty missed); Diamé (penalty missed)

Municipal de Portimão, Portimão
Referee: Fernando Santos

=== Day 3 ===
2013-08-07
21h15

Sporting CP (Portugal)	0 – 1	(Portugal) Braga
		Edinho 52'

Municipal de Portimão, Portimão
Referee: Ivo Santos
