= 2013–14 West Ham United F.C. season =

English football team season

West Ham United
2013–14 season
- Co-chairmen: David Gold; David Sullivan
- Manager: Sam Allardyce
- Stadium: Boleyn Ground; Upton Park, London
- Premier League: 13th
- FA Cup: Third round
- League Cup: Semi-finals
- Top goalscorer: League: Kevin Nolan (7); All: Kevin Nolan (7)
- Highest home attendance: League: 34,977 (vs. Cardiff City, Aston Villa, Chelsea, Arsenal, Liverpool, Crystal Palace and Tottenham Hotspur); Cup: 23,440 (vs. Cheltenham Town, League Cup 2nd round)
- Lowest home attendance: League: 31,843 (vs. Sunderland); Cup: 14,390 (vs. Manchester City, League Cup Semi-final, 2nd leg)
Home colours	Away colours	Third colours

The 2013–14 season was West Ham United's second campaign in the Premier League since being promoted in the 2011–12 season. It was West Ham's 18th Premier League campaign overall.

As well as competing in the Premier League, West Ham took part in the FA Cup and the League Cup, entering at the third and second rounds respectively. They were eliminated in the third round of the FA Cup following a 5–0 away defeat by Nottingham Forest. They reached the semi-finals of the League Cup before losing 9–0 on aggregate to Manchester City. West Ham finished in 13th place in the league.

Sam Allardyce took charge of his third full season as West Ham manager. Kevin Nolan captained West Ham for the third season running.

== Season summary ==
- 21 May 2013: West Ham announced the signing of Romania captain, left back Răzvan Raț, making him the first signing in this transfer window.
- 21 May 2013: West Ham and Liverpool agree on a £15 million deal to bring Andy Carroll to Upton Park, with the striker yet to agree personal terms.
- 22 May 2013: The Club announced that experienced striker Carlton Cole would not be offered a new contract. He was released together with young professionals Eoin Wearen, Jake Larkins, Jack Powell and Declan Hunt. Scholars Cheye Alexander, Nigel Seidu and Josh Siafa were also released.
- 5 June 2013: West Ham announced the signing of Real Betis goalkeeper Adrián.
- 18 June 2013: West Ham target Andy Carroll passes a medical ahead of a move to the club. Co-Chairman David Gold tweeted that Carroll had passed the medical "with flying colours". Carroll signed the following day on a six-year contract for a fee of £15 million.
- 19 June 2013: West Ham announced the permanent signing of Andy Carroll from Liverpool, for an undisclosed, club record fee.
- 20 June 2013: The club announced the signing of Stockport County youngster Danny Whitehead.
- 1 July 2013: Winger Robert Hall left the club to become a player at Bolton Wanderers.
- 13 August 2013: West Ham announced the signing of Liverpool winger Stewart Downing.
- 17 August 2013: West Ham open their season with a 2–0 home win against newly promoted Cardiff City. On target were Joe Cole and captain Kevin Nolan. New signing Stewart Downing makes his debut, coming on as a substitute in the second half.
- 24 August 2013: Stewart Downing starts for the first time as West Ham share the spoils with Newcastle in a 0–0 draw at St James' Park.
- 27 August 2013: Ravel Morrison scores his first competitive goal for the club as West Ham beat League Two opposition Cheltenham Town in the League Cup second round.
- 27 August 2013: French midfielder Alou Diarra suffers a serious knee ligament injury and is likely to miss the rest of the season.
- 31 August 2013: West Ham lose their first game of the season at home to Stoke City, 1–0. Elliot Lee makes his Premier League debut for the club.
- 5 September 2013: West Ham win the Ciutat de Barcelona Trophy in Barcelona. Mark Noble scores the only goal, a penalty, against Espanyol.
- 9 September 2013: West Ham announce that striker Andy Carroll has suffered a new injury during his return to full training, and will be out of action for longer than was expected.
- 10 September: The Hammers confirm the signing of Croatian forward Mladen Petrić on a free transfer.
- 15 September: A 0–0 draw to Southampton sees West Ham remain unbeaten away from home so far this season. Ravel Morrison makes his first Premier League start for the club.
- 19 September 2013: Leyton Orient fail in their bid to win a judicial review into the decision to grant West Ham the tenancy of the Olympic Stadium.
- 21 September 2013: Mark Noble, having scored a penalty for West Ham to put them 2–1 ahead against Everton, becomes their first player to be dismissed this season after a second booking. Everton won 3–2 with late goals from Leighton Baines and Romelu Lukaku. Ravel Morrison scored his first Premier League goal for the club in the same game. The defeat leaves the Hammers without a win since the opening day of the season.
- 24 September 2013: West Ham defeat Cardiff City 3–2 in the League Cup fourth round. After going ahead 2–0 from goals from Ravel Morrison and Matt Jarvis, Cardiff fought back to level at 2–2. A Ricardo Vaz Tê header late into the game proved to be decisive and sent West Ham into the next round, where they will face Burnley.
- 28 September 2013: A 1–0 loss to newly promoted Hull City saw West Ham's run without a win stretch to five games. This was the club's first away defeat of the season and left them just one point above the relegation zone.
- 6 October 2013: West Ham win their first away game of the season with a 0–3 victory against Tottenham Hotspur. This was their first win at White Hart Lane since 1999.
- 14 October 2013: The club announce the re-signing of previously released striker Carlton Cole. The 30-year-old signed a three-month contract with a view to extend it in the future.
- 19 October 2013: West Ham suffer a third-straight home defeat at the hands of Manchester City. An acrobatic Ricardo Vaz Tê effort halved the deficit to 2–1, but David Silva finished late on to secure the three points for City.
- 27 October 2013: A 0–0 draw away to Swansea City saw West Ham pick up their sixth away point of the season. Carlton Cole came on as a second-half substitute in his first appearance since re-joining the club.
- 29 October 2013: The Hammers advanced to the fifth round of the League Cup for the first time in three years by beating Championship leaders Burnley 2–0 at Turf Moor.
- 2 November 2013: West Ham gain a point from a 0–0 draw against Aston Villa. The result saw them pick up their first point at home since the opening day's win against Cardiff City.
- 9 November 2013: A 3–1 defeat away to Norwich City left the club one point above the relegation zone. Ravel Morrison scored the only goal for West Ham.
- 23 November 2013: West Ham are defeated at home by London rivals Chelsea, 0–3. Former player Frank Lampard scores two with Oscar adding the third.
- 30 November 2013: Carlton Cole scores his first goal since his return to the club in a 3–0 home win against Fulham.
- 3 December 2013: A midweek trip to Selhurst Park sees the Hammers lose 1–0. Crystal Palace player and former West Ham striker Marouane Chamakh gets the only goal.
- 7 December 2013: West Ham are defeated 4–1 by Liverpool at Anfield. Three own goals are scored, including two by Joey O'Brien and Guy Demel; Martin Škrtel was at fault for the other. Kevin Nolan saw straight red and picked up a three-match ban.
- 14 December 2013: A bottom of the table clash between Sunderland and West Ham ends 0–0 at Upton Park.
- 18 December 2013: West Ham defeat Tottenham for the second time at White Hart Lane this season, this time in the League Cup quarter-finals. Late goals from Matt Jarvis and Modibo Maïga secured a 1–2 win and sent the Hammers into the semi-finals to set up a two-legged tie against Manchester City.
- 21 December 2013: Carlton Cole scores his 50th league goal for West Ham in a 3–1 defeat by Manchester Utd at Old Trafford.
- 26 December 2013: West Ham lose to Arsenal 1–3 placing them in 19th place and in the relegation zone.
- 28 December 2013: West Ham draw 3–3 with West Bromwich Albion at Upton Park. Also in the news was the release of Croatian forward Mladen Petrić by the club. He had been at the club three months.
- 1 January 2014: Fulham defeat West Ham 2–1 at Craven Cottage in a match that sees Kevin Nolan sent off for the second time in a month, banning him for four matches.
- 5 January 2014: West Ham are knocked out from the FA Cup after losing 5–0 to Nottingham Forest.
- 8 January 2014: West Ham suffer a second heavy defeat in a row in losing 6–0 to Manchester City in the semi-final of the Capital One Cup. This was their heaviest defeat of the season and Sam Allardyce's heaviest defeat as West Ham manager.
- 11 January 2014: West Ham win their first game of 2014 with a 0–2 away victory to Cardiff City. Carlton Cole got the first with Mark Noble adding a second deep into injury time. Andy Carroll provided the assist for Noble's goal in his first appearance for the club this season. James Tomkins was sent off for a second bookable offence and picked up a one-match ban.
- 21 January 2014: Manchester City win the second leg of the League Cup semi-final 0–3 to complete a record aggregate score for a semi-final, at 9–0.
- 25 January 2014: West Ham sign Italian duo Marco Borriello and Antonio Nocerino on loan until the end of the season.
- 29 January 2014: West Ham earn a point at Stamford Bridge against London rivals Chelsea in a 0–0 draw.
- 1 February 2014: Kevin Nolan scores twice with Andy Carroll setting up both goals in a 2–0 home win against Swansea City. Winston Reid makes his return from injury. Andy Carroll is sent off for violent conduct.
- 4 February 2014: The FA rejects West Ham's appeal against Andy Carroll's red card and his three-match ban is upheld.
- 8 February 2014: With no Andy Carroll, Kevin Nolan scores a brace for the second consecutive match, against Aston Villa, propelling West Ham out of the relegation zone.
- 11 February 2014: A 2–0 home win against Norwich City gives West Ham four consecutive clean sheets, the first time this has occurred since December 1985.
- 19 February 2014: Ravel Morrison is loaned to Queens Park Rangers for 93 days, meaning he will be eligible to play for them in the Championship playoff final if they reach it; the loan includes a clause allowing West Ham to recall him after 28 days.
- 22 February 2014: West Ham win their fourth-straight match, against Southampton, with goals from Matt Jarvis, Carlton Cole and Kevin Nolan. The win places West Ham into tenth in the Premier League table, their highest position since September.
- 1 March 2014: The club's winning run comes to an end after a late Romelu Lukaku goal secures all three points for Everton at Goodison Park.
- 8 March 2014: Andy Carroll scores his first goal of the season versus Stoke City, but it is not enough as West Ham lose 3–1.
- 14 March 2014: Manager Sam Allardyce is named Premier League Manager of the Month for February 2014, the fifth time he has won the award.
- 22 March 2014: Wayne Rooney scores a brace which sees the Hammers defeated 0–2 by Manchester United at Upton Park.
- 26 March 2014: A penalty and an own goal help West Ham see off Hull City 2–1 at Upton Park. Despite the win, the players were booed off at full-time.
- 31 March 2014: West Ham beat Sunderland 1–2 at the Stadium of Light thanks to goals from Andy Carroll and Mohamed Diamé. The win puts the club nine points clear of the relegation zone with six games left to play.
- 6 April 2014: Two Liverpool penalties see off West ham 1–2 at the Boleyn Ground.
- 15 April 2014: Despite taking a 1–0 lead through Matt Jarvis, West Ham are beaten 3–1 by Arsenal at the Emirates Stadium.
- 18 April 2014: West Ham youth team striker Dylan Tombides dies aged 20 from testicular cancer.
- 19 April 2014: A 0–1 defeat by Crystal Palace is the club's ninth home loss of the season.
- 26 April 2014: West Brom defeat West Ham 1–0 at The Hawthorns.
- 3 May 2014: West Ham beat Tottenham for the third time this season. A 2–0 home victory also sees Stewart Downing's first goal for West Ham and ensures West Ham a place in the 2014–15 Premier League.
- 6 May 2014: Mark Noble is crowned Hammer of the Year for 2013–14 whilst Ravel Morrison wins Goal of the Season for his solo effort against Tottenham in October 2013.
- 11 May 2014: West Ham are defeated in their final match 2–0 by Premier League champions Manchester City. The club finished 13th.

== Final League table ==
Pos	Team	Pld	W	D	L	GF	GA	GD	Pts
11	Crystal Palace	38	13	6	19	33	48	−15	45
12	Swansea City	38	11	9	18	54	54	0	42
13	West Ham United	38	11	7	20	40	51	−11	40
14	Sunderland	38	10	8	20	41	60	−19	38
15	Aston Villa	38	10	8	20	39	61	−22	38

Source: Barclays Premier League
Rules for classification: 1) Points; 2) Goal difference; 3) Goals scored; 4) Play-offs (only if needed to decide champion, teams for relegation or teams for UEFA competitions).

== Squad ==
Note: Flags indicate national team as defined under FIFA eligibility rules; some limited exceptions apply. Players may hold more than one non-FIFA nationality.

No.	Pos.	Nation	Player
2	DF	NZL	Winston Reid
3	DF	NIR	George McCartney
4	MF	ENG	Kevin Nolan (captain)
5	DF	ENG	James Tomkins
7	MF	ENG	Matt Jarvis
8	DF	COL	Pablo Armero (on loan from Napoli)
9	FW	ENG	Andy Carroll
10	MF	WAL	Jack Collison
11	FW	MLI	Modibo Maïga
12	FW	POR	Ricardo Vaz Te
13	GK	ESP	Adrián
14	MF	ENG	Matthew Taylor
15	MF	ENG	Ravel Morrison
16	MF	ENG	Mark Noble (vice-captain)

No.	Pos.	Nation	Player
17	DF	IRL	Joey O'Brien
18	MF	FRA	Alou Diarra
19	DF	WAL	James Collins
20	DF	CIV	Guy Demel
21	MF	SEN	Mohamed Diame
22	GK	FIN	Jussi Jääskeläinen
23	MF	ENG	Stewart Downing
24	FW	ENG	Carlton Cole
25	GK	IRL	Stephen Henderson
26	MF	ENG	Joe Cole
28	DF	ENG	Roger Johnson (on loan from Wolverhampton Wanderers)
46	FW	ITA	Marco Borriello (on loan from A.C. Milan)
47	MF	ITA	Antonio Nocerino (on loan from A.C. Milan)

== Results ==
=== Pre-season ===
7 July 2013	Cork City	2–6	West Ham United	Cork, Ireland
18:00 BST	Rundle 38'; R. Lehane 86'	Report	Diarra 5'; J. Cole 18'; Taylor 62'; McCallum 72'; Noble 73' (pen.); Morrison 85'	Stadium: Turners Cross; Attendance: 4,213

10 July 2013	Boreham Wood	0–3	West Ham United	Borehamwood
19:30 BST		Report	Morrison 20'; Vaz Tê 21'; Nolan 84'	Stadium: Meadow Park; Referee: A. Serrano

13 July 2013	AFC Bournemouth	0–2	West Ham United	Bournemouth
15:00 BST		Report	Nolan 8'; Collison 45'	Stadium: Dean Court; Attendance: 7,080

16 July 2013	Colchester United	1–2	West Ham United	Colchester
19:45 BST	Ibehre 90+1'	Report	J. Cole 7'; Collins 50'	Stadium: Colchester Community Stadium; Attendance: 6,610

20 July 2013	Mainz 05	4–1	West Ham United	Mainz, Germany
18:00 BST	Schahin 9'; N. Müller 20'; Parker 76'; Polter 79'	Report	J. Cole 47'	Stadium: Bruchwegstadion; Referee: Jochen Drees

23 July 2013	Hamburg	1–3	West Ham United	Flensburg, Germany
18:45 BST	Westermann 43'	Report	Diarra 15'; Tomkins 28'; Morrison 45' (pen.)	Stadium: Flensburger Stadion

27 July 2013	Eintracht Braunschweig	0–3	West Ham United	Braunschweig, Germany
14:30 BST		Report	Maïga 22', 44'; Diamé 42'	Stadium: Eintracht-Stadion; Attendance: 10,800

10 August 2013	West Ham United	2–1	Paços de Ferreira	London
15:00 BST	Morrison 1'; Maïga 40'	Report	Vieira 51'	Stadium: Boleyn Ground; Referee: Kevin Friend

=== Guadiana Trophy ===
West Ham announced on 31 July that they would take part in the 2013 Guadiana Trophy. Also taking part were Primeira Liga sides Sporting CP and Braga. West Ham finished the two-day tournament in second, behind Braga.

5 August 2013	Sporting CP	2–3	West Ham United	Estádio Municipal de Portimão, Portimão
21:15 BST	Capel 45'; Carvalho 84'	Report	Nolan 58'; Morrison 59', 79'

6 August 2013	Braga	1–0	West Ham United	Estádio Municipal de Portimão, Portimão
21:15 BST	Silva 63'	Report

Team	Pld	W	D	L	GF	GA	GD	Pts
Braga	2	2	0	0	2	0	2	6
West Ham United	2	1	0	1	3	3	0	3
Sporting CP	2	0	0	2	2	4	-2	0

=== Other matches ===
West Ham announced on 28 August that they would play a friendly game against Spanish Primera Division side Espanyol during the upcoming international break.

5 September 2013	Espanyol	0–1	West Ham United	Estadi Cornellà-El Prat, Barcelona
20:00 BST		Report	Noble 43' (pen.)	Referee: Alfonso Álvarez Izquierdo

=== Premier League ===
==== Results by matchday ====
Matchday	1	2	3	4	5	6	7	8	9	10	11	12	13	14	15	16	17	18	19	20	21	22	23	24	25	26	27	28	29	30	31	32	33	34	35	36	37	38
Ground	H	A	H	A	H	A	A	H	A	H	A	H	H	A	A	H	A	H	H	A	A	H	A	H	A	H	H	A	H	A	H	A	H	A	H	A	H	A
Result	W	D	L	D	L	L	W	L	D	D	L	L	W	L	L	D	L	L	D	L	W	L	D	W	W	W	W	L	L	L	W	W	L	L	L	L	W	L
Position	5	5	8	10	15	17	13	15	15	15	16	17	15	17	17	17	17	19	19	19	17	18	18	18	15	12	10	10	11	11	11	10	11	12	12	13	12	13

Source: worldfootball.net
A = Away; H = Home; W = Win; D = Draw; L = Loss

17 August 2013 1	West Ham United	2–0	Cardiff City	London
15:00 BST	J. Cole 13'; Nolan 76'	Report	Connolly (yellow card) 27'	Stadium: Boleyn Ground; Attendance: 34,977; Referee: Howard Webb

24 August 2013 2	Newcastle United	0–0	West Ham United	Newcastle
15:00 BST		Report	O'Brien (yellow card) 44'	Stadium: St James' Park; Attendance: 49,622; Referee: Phil Dowd

31 August 2013 3	West Ham United	0–1	Stoke City	London
15:00 BST	Reid (yellow card) 81'; Collins (yellow card) 90+4'	Report	Pennant 82'; Cameron (yellow card) 85'	Stadium: Boleyn Ground; Attendance: 34,946; Referee: Jonathan Moss

15 September 2013 4	Southampton	0–0	West Ham United	Southampton
16:00 BST	Wanyama (yellow card) 66'	Report	Diamé (yellow card) 29'; Noble (yellow card) 64'; O'Brien (yellow card) 70'	Stadium: St Mary's; Attendance: 28,794; Referee: Andre Marriner

21 September 2013 5	West Ham United	2–3	Everton	London
15:00 BST	Morrison 31', (yellow card) 37'; Collins (yellow card) 61'; Noble 76' (pen.), (yellow card) 68' (yellow-red card) 81'	Report	Barkley (yellow card) 45'; Baines 62', 83'; Lukaku 85'	Stadium: Boleyn Ground; Attendance: 34,952; Referee: Lee Mason

28 September 2013 6	Hull City	1–0	West Ham United	Kingston upon Hull
15:00 BST	Brady 12' (pen.); Graham (yellow card) 45+1'	Report	Nolan (yellow card) 8'; Morrison (yellow card) 8'	Stadium: KC Stadium; Attendance: 24,291; Referee: Kevin Friend

6 October 2013 7	Tottenham Hotspur	0–3	West Ham United	London
16:00 BST		Report	Reid 66'; Vaz Tê 72'; Morrison 79'	Stadium: White Hart Lane; Attendance: 35,977; Referee: Lee Probert

19 October 2013 8	West Ham United	1–3	Manchester City	London
17:30 BST	Nolan (yellow card) 33'; Vaz Tê 58'	Report	Agüero 16', 51'; Silva (yellow card) 26'; Clichy (yellow card) 63'; Silva 80'	Stadium: Boleyn Ground; Attendance: 34,507; Referee: Michael Oliver

27 October 2013 9	Swansea City	0–0	West Ham United	Swansea
16:00 UTC	Rangel (yellow card) 65'	Report	Demel (yellow card) 24'; Morrison (yellow card) 43'; J. Cole (yellow card) 87'	Stadium: Liberty Stadium; Attendance: 20,455; Referee: Phil Dowd

2 November 2013 10	West Ham United	0–0	Aston Villa	London
15:00 UTC		Report	Bacuna (yellow card) 46'; Lowton (yellow card) 57'	Stadium: Boleyn Ground; Attendance: 34,977; Referee: Howard Webb

9 November 2013 11	Norwich City	3–1	West Ham United	Norwich
17:30 UTC	Turner (yellow card) 51'; Hooper 54' (pen.); Snodgrass 72'; Fer 90+3'	Report	Morrison 32'; Nolan (yellow card) 71'	Stadium: Carrow Road; Attendance: 26,824; Referee: Jonathan Moss

23 November 2013 12	West Ham United	0–3	Chelsea	London
17:30 UTC		Report	Lampard 21' (pen.), 82'; Oscar 34'	Stadium: Boleyn Ground; Attendance: 34,977; Referee: Chris Foy

30 November 2013 13	West Ham United	3–0	Fulham	London
15:00 UTC	Tomkins (yellow card) 11'; McCartney (yellow card) 27'; Diamé (yellow card) 45' (goal) 47'; C. Cole 82'; J. Cole 88'	Report	Richardson (yellow card) 8'; Sidwell (yellow card) 21'	Stadium: Boleyn Ground; Attendance: 34,946; Referee: Martin Atkinson

3 December 2013 14	Crystal Palace	1–0	West Ham United	London
20:00 UTC	Delaney (yellow card) 31'; Chamakh 42'	Report	Tomkins (yellow card) 67'; Morrison (yellow card) 90+6'	Stadium: Selhurst Park; Attendance: 23,891; Referee: Lee Mason

7 December 2013 15	Liverpool	4–1	West Ham United	Liverpool
15:00 UTC	Demel 42' (o.g.); Sakho 47'; Suárez 81', 84'	Report	Škrtel 66' (o.g.); J. Cole (yellow card) 75'; Demel (yellow card) 82'; Nolan (red card) 82'; Collins (yellow card) 90+2'	Stadium: Anfield; Attendance: 44,781; Referee: Michael Oliver

14 December 2013 16	West Ham United	0–0	Sunderland	London
15:00 UTC	Noble (yellow card) 25'	Report		Stadium: Boleyn Ground; Attendance: 31,843; Referee: Andre Marriner

21 December 2013 17	Manchester United	3–1	West Ham United	Manchester
15:00 UTC	Welbeck 26'; Januzaj 36' (yellow card) 42'; Young 72'	Report	Morrison (yellow card) 18'; Jarvis (yellow card) 65'; Tomkins (yellow card) 67'; McCartney (yellow card) 76'; C. Cole 81'	Stadium: Old Trafford; Attendance: 75,350; Referee: Mike Jones

26 December 2013 18	West Ham United	1–3	Arsenal	London
15:00 UTC	O'Brien (yellow card) 20'; C. Cole 46'	Report	Cazorla (yellow card) 61'; Walcott 68', 71'; Podolski 79'	Stadium: Boleyn Ground; Attendance: 34,977; Referee: Phil Dowd

28 December 2013 19	West Ham United	3–3	West Bromwich Albion	London
12:45 UTC	J. Cole 4'; C. Cole (yellow card) 43'; Nolan (yellow card) 57', (goal) 67'; Maïga 65'; Diamé (yellow card) 81'	Report	Anelka 40', 45'; Mulumbu (yellow card) 48'; Berahino 69'; Ridgewell (yellow card) 90'	Stadium: Boleyn Ground; Attendance: 34,946; Referee: Mike Dean

1 January 2014 20	Fulham	2–1	West Ham United	London
15:00 UTC	Sidwell 32'; Berbatov 66', (yellow card) 70'; Amorebieta (yellow card) 76'	Report	Diamé 6'; Nolan (red card) 44'; Raț (yellow card) 63'	Stadium: Craven Cottage; Attendance: 25,335; Referee: Mark Clattenburg

11 January 2014 21	Cardiff City	0–2	West Ham United	Cardiff
15:00 UTC	Medel (yellow card) 45+10'	Report	C. Cole 42'; McCartney (yellow card) 50'; Tomkins (yellow card) 61' (yellow-red card) 72'; Johnson (yellow card) 70'; Diarra (yellow card) 90'; Noble 90+3'	Stadium: Cardiff City Stadium; Attendance: 27,750; Referee: Lee Mason

18 January 2014 22	West Ham United	1–3	Newcastle United	London
15:00 UTC	C. Cole 45+2'	Report	Cabaye 16', 90+4'; Rémy 33'	Stadium: Boleyn Ground; Attendance: 33,343; Referee: Andre Marriner

29 January 2014 23	Chelsea	0–0	West Ham United	London
19:45 UTC	Ramires (yellow card) 84'	Report	O'Brien (yellow card) 58'; Taylor (yellow card) 61'; Nolan (yellow card) 74'	Stadium: Stamford Bridge; Attendance: 41,376; Referee: Neil Swarbrick

1 February 2014 24	West Ham United	2–0	Swansea City	London
12:45 UTC	Nolan 26', 45'; Noble (yellow card) 33'; Carroll (red card) 59'	Report		Stadium: Boleyn Ground; Attendance: 31,848; Referee: Howard Webb

8 February 2014 25	Aston Villa	0–2	West Ham United	Birmingham
15:00 UTC		Report	Collins (yellow card) 33'; Nolan 46', 48'; Taylor (yellow card) 64'	Stadium: Villa Park; Attendance: 36,261; Referee: Mike Dean

11 February 2014 26	West Ham United	2–0	Norwich City	London
19:45 UTC	Collins 84'; Nocerino (yellow card) 90+3'; Diamé 90+4'	Report	Olsson (yellow card) 43'; Johnson (yellow card) 60'; Pilkington (yellow card) 90+3'	Stadium: Boleyn Ground; Attendance: 35,153; Referee: Michael Oliver

22 February 2014 27	West Ham United	3–1	Southampton	London
15:00 UTC	Jarvis 20'; C. Cole 23'; Nolan 71'	Report	Yoshida 8'; Lallana (yellow card) 87'	Stadium: Boleyn Ground; Attendance: 33,148; Referee: Mark Clattenburg

1 March 2014 28	Everton	1–0	West Ham United	Liverpool
15:00 UTC	Lukaku 81'; Baines (yellow card) 90'	Report	Tomkins (yellow card) 30'	Stadium: Goodison Park; Attendance: 38,286; Referee: Jonathan Moss

15 March 2014 29	Stoke City	3–1	West Ham United	Stoke-on-Trent
15:00 UTC	Crouch 32'; Arnautović 69'; Whelan (yellow card) 78'; Odemwingie 79'	Report	Carroll 5'; Noble (yellow card) 86'	Stadium: Britannia Stadium; Attendance: 27,015; Referee: Craig Pawson

22 March 2014 30	West Ham United	0–2	Manchester United	London
17:30 UTC	Collins (yellow card) 33'; Taylor (yellow card) 39'	Report	Rooney 8', 33'; Rafael (yellow card) 11'	Stadium: Boleyn Ground; Attendance: 34,237; Referee: Lee Mason

26 March 2014 31	West Ham United	2–1	Hull City	London
19:45 UTC	Noble 26' (pen.); Chester 54' (o.g.)	Report	Livermore (yellow card) 18'; McGregor (red card) 23'; Huddlestone 48'	Stadium: Boleyn Ground; Attendance: 31,033; Referee: Mike Dean

31 March 2014 32	Sunderland	1–2	West Ham United	Sunderland
20:00 BST	Johnson 65'; Alonso (yellow card) 72'; Wickham (yellow card) 75'	Report	Noble (yellow card) 3'; Carroll 9'; Diamé 50'; Nolan (yellow card) 67'; Adrián (yellow card) 90+2'	Stadium: Stadium of Light; Attendance: 37,396; Referee: Howard Webb

6 April 2014 33	West Ham United	1–2	Liverpool	London
16:00 BST	Tomkins (yellow card) 43'; Demel 45'; Adrián (yellow card) 70'; Nocerino (yellow card) 80'; Armero (yellow card) 86'	Report	Gerrard 44' (pen.), 71' (pen.)	Stadium: Boleyn Ground; Attendance: 34,977; Referee: Anthony Taylor

15 April 2014 34	Arsenal	3–1	West Ham United	London
19:45 BST	Rosický (yellow card) 15'; Podolski 44', 78'; Giroud 55'; Källström (yellow card) 63'	Report	Nocerino (yellow card) 37'; Jarvis 40'; Diamé (yellow card) 60'	Stadium: Emirates Stadium; Attendance: 59,977; Referee: Kevin Friend

19 April 2014 35	West Ham United	0–1	Crystal Palace	London
15:00 BST	McCartney (yellow card) 49'	Report	Jedinak 59' (pen.); Murray (yellow card) 90'	Stadium: Boleyn Ground; Attendance: 34,977; Referee: Martin Atkinson

26 April 2014 36	West Bromwich Albion	1–0	West Ham United	West Bromwich
15:00 BST	Berahino 11'	Report	Collins (yellow card) 90'	Stadium: The Hawthorns; Attendance: 26,541; Referee: Mike Dean

3 May 2014 37	West Ham United	2–0	Tottenham Hotspur	London
12:30 BST	Kane 27' (o.g.); Downing 44'	Report	Naughton (yellow card) 19'; Kaboul (red card) 25'; Dawson (yellow card) 43'; Soldado (yellow card) 71'; Sandro (yellow card) 84'	Stadium: Boleyn Ground; Attendance: 34,977; Referee: Phil Dowd

11 May 2014 38	Manchester City	2–0	West Ham United	Manchester
15:00 BST	Nasri 39'; Kompany 49'; Demichelis (yellow card) 61'; Agüero (yellow card) 90'	Report	Nolan (yellow card) 32'; Noble (yellow card) 90'	Stadium: Etihad Stadium; Attendance: 47,300; Referee: Martin Atkinson

=== Football League Cup ===
27 August 2013 Round 2	West Ham United	2–1	Cheltenham Town	London, England
19:45 BST	Morrison (yellow card) 37', (goal) 46'; Vaz Tê 42'; Adrián (yellow card) 56'	Report	Richards 59' (pen.); Elliot (yellow card) 62'	Stadium: Boleyn Ground; Attendance: 23,440; Referee: Graham Scott

24 September 2013 Round 3	West Ham United	3–2	Cardiff City	London, England
19:45 BST	Morrison 1'; Jarvis 8'; Vaz Tê 88'	Report	Noone 45'; Odemwingie 76'	Stadium: Boleyn Ground; Attendance: 18,611; Referee: Roger East

29 October 2013 Round 4	Burnley	0–2	West Ham United	Burnley, England
19:45 UTC	Shackell (yellow card) 76'; Treacy (red card) 90'	Report	Taylor 76' (pen.); Collison 90' (pen.)	Stadium: Turf Moor; Attendance: 14,376; Referee: Robert Madley

18 December 2013 R5	Tottenham Hotspur	1–2	West Ham United	London, England
19:45 UTC	Adebayor (yellow card) 33', (goal) 67'	Report	Diarra (yellow card) 61'; Jarvis 80'; Maïga 85'	Stadium: White Hart Lane; Attendance: 34,080; Referee: Neil Swarbrick

8 January 2014 Semi-Final First Leg	Manchester City	6–0	West Ham United	Manchester
19:45 GMT	Negredo 12', 26', 49'; Touré 41'; Džeko 61', 89'	Report		Stadium: Etihad Stadium; Attendance: 30,381; Referee: Jonathan Moss

21 January 2014 Semi-Final Second Leg	West Ham United	0–3 (0–9 agg.)	Manchester City	London
19:45 GMT	Diarra (yellow card) 37'	Report	Negredo 3', 59'; Agüero 24', (yellow card) 30'; Clichy (yellow card) 63'	Stadium: Boleyn Ground; Attendance: 14,390; Referee: Chris Foy

=== FA Cup ===
5 January 2014 Round 3	Nottingham Forest	5–0	West Ham United	Nottingham, England
12:00 UTC	Abdoun 12' (pen.); Paterson 65', 71', 79'; Derbyshire (yellow card) 87'; Reid 90'	Report	Lletget (yellow card) 45'	Stadium: City Ground; Attendance: 14,397; Referee: Martin Atkinson

== Statistics ==
=== Appearances and goals ===
No.	Pos	Nat	Player	Total		Premier League		FA Cup		League Cup	
No.	Pos	Nat	Player	Apps	Goals	Apps	Goals	Apps	Goals	Apps	Goals
Goalkeepers
13	GK	(Spain) ESP	Adrián	26	0	20	0	1	0	5	0
22	GK	(Finland) FIN	Jussi Jääskeläinen	19	0	18	0	0	0	1	0
Defenders
2	DF	(New Zealand) NZL	Winston Reid	22	1	18+4	1	0	0	0	0
3	DF	(Northern Ireland) NIR	George McCartney	26	0	20+2	0	0	0	4	0
5	DF	(England) ENG	James Tomkins	35	0	31	0	0	0	4	0
8	DF	(Colombia) COL	Pablo Armero	5	0	3+2	0	0	0	0	0
17	DF	(Republic of Ireland) IRL	Joey O'Brien	20	0	13+4	0	0	0	3	0
19	DF	(Wales) WAL	James Collins	26	1	22+2	1	0	0	2	0
20	DF	(Ivory Coast) CIV	Guy Demel	33	1	30+2	1	0	0	1	0
28	DF	(England) ENG	Roger Johnson	6	0	2+2	0	0	0	2	0
33	DF	(England) ENG	Danny Potts	2	0	0	0	1	0	1	0
37	DF	(England) ENG	Leo Chambers	3	0	0	0	0	0	3	0
39	DF	(England) ENG	Callum Driver	1	0	0	0	1	0	0	0
44	DF	(England) ENG	Reece Burke	1	0	0	0	0+1	0	0	0
Midfielders
4	MF	(England) ENG	Kevin Nolan	35	7	33	7	0	0	1+1	0
7	MF	(England) ENG	Matt Jarvis	35	4	23+9	2	1	0	2	2
10	MF	(Wales) WAL	Jack Collison	15	1	6+4	0	0	0	3+2	1
14	MF	(England) ENG	Matthew Taylor	26	1	16+4	0	0	0	6	1
15	MF	(England) ENG	Ravel Morrison	21	5	12+4	3	1	0	3+1	2
16	MF	(England) ENG	Mark Noble	39	3	38	3	0	0	1	0
18	MF	(France) FRA	Alou Diarra	8	0	1+2	0	1	0	3+1	0
21	MF	(Senegal) SEN	Mohamed Diamé	41	4	29+6	4	0	0	3+3	0
23	MF	(England) ENG	Stewart Downing	37	1	29+3	1	1	0	1+3	0
26	MF	(England) ENG	Joe Cole	25	3	6+14	3	0	0	5	0
31	MF	(England) ENG	Danny Whitehead	1	0	0	0	1	0	0	0
34	MF	(England) ENG	George Moncur	1	0	0	0	1	0	0	0
35	MF	(United States) USA	Sebastian Lletget	1	0	0	0	1	0	0	0
41	MF	(England) ENG	Matthias Fanimo	1	0	0	0	0+1	0	0	0
47	MF	(Italy) ITA	Antonio Nocerino	10	0	2+8	0	0	0	0	0
Forwards
9	FW	(England) ENG	Andy Carroll	16	2	12+3	2	0	0	1	0
11	FW	(Mali) MLI	Modibo Maïga	19	2	11+3	1	1	0	3+1	1
12	FW	(Portugal) POR	Ricardo Vaz Tê	10	4	3+5	2	0	0	2	2
24	FW	(England) ENG	Carlton Cole	30	6	9+17	6	0	0	2+2	0
32	FW	(England) ENG	Elliot Lee	1	0	0+1	0	0	0	0	0
36	FW	(England) ENG	Blair Turgott	1	0	0	0	0+1	0	0	0
46	FW	(Italy) ITA	Marco Borriello	2	0	0+2	0	0	0	0	0
Players transferred out during the season
8	DF	(Romania) ROU	Răzvan Raț	20	0	11+4	0	0	0	3+2	0
30	FW	(Croatia) CRO	Mladen Petrić	4	0	0+3	0	0	0	0+1	0
33	DF	(England) ENG	Pelly Ruddock Mpanzu	1	0	0	0	0	0	1	0

Last updated: 31 May 2014
Source: Competitions

=== Overview ===
Competition	Record							
Competition	P	W	D	L	GF	GA	GD	Win %
Premier League	38	11	7	20	40	51	−11	28.95
FA Cup	1	0	0	1	0	5	−5	0.00
League Cup	6	4	0	2	9	13	−4	66.67
Total	45	15	7	23	49	69	−20	33.33

=== Goalscorers ===
Rank	Pos	No.	Nat	Name	Premier League	FA Cup	League Cup	Total
1	MF	4	(England)	Kevin Nolan	7	0	0	7
2	ST	24	(England)	Carlton Cole	6	0	0	6
3	MF	15	(England)	Ravel Morrison	3	0	2	5
4	MF	7	(England)	Matt Jarvis	2	0	2	4
4	ST	12	(Portugal)	Ricardo Vaz Te	2	0	2	4
4	MF	21	(Senegal)	Mohamed Diame	4	0	0	4
7	MF	16	(England)	Mark Noble	3	0	0	3
7	MF	26	(England)	Joe Cole	3	0	0	3
7	Own goals				3	0	0	3
10	ST	9	(England)	Andy Carroll	2	0	0	2
10	ST	11	(Mali)	Modibo Maiga	1	0	1	2
12	DF	2	(New Zealand)	Winston Reid	1	0	0	1
12	MF	10	(Wales)	Jack Collison	0	0	1	1
12	MF	14	(England)	Matthew Taylor	0	0	1	1
12	DF	19	(Wales)	James Collins	1	0	0	1
12	DF	20	(Ivory Coast)	Guy Demel	1	0	0	1
12	MF	23	(England)	Stewart Downing	1	0	0	1
Totals					40	0	9	49

=== League position by matchday ===
Matchday	1	2	3	4	5	6	7	8	9	10	11	12	13	14	15	16	17	18	19	20	21	22	23	24	25	26	27	28	29	30	31	32	33	34	35	36	37	38
Ground	H	A	H	A	H	A	A	H	A	H	A	H	H	A	A	H	A	H	H	A	A	H	A	H	A	H	H	A	H	A	H	A	H	A	H	A	H	A
Result	W	D	L	D	L	L	W	L	D	D	L	L	W	L	L	D	L	L	D	L	W	L	D	W	W	W	W	L	L	L	W	W	L	L	L	L	W	L
Position	3	3	7	10	13	16	13	14	15	14	16	17	15	15	17	17	17	19	19	19	17	18	18	18	15	11	10	10	12	14	11	11	11	11	12	14	12	13

A = Away; H = Home; W = Win; D = Draw; L = Loss

== Transfers ==
=== Summer ===
==== In ====
#	Pos	Player	From	Fee	Date	Notes
8	DF	(Romania) Răzvan Raț	(Ukraine) Shakhtar Donetsk	Free	21 May 2013	
13	GK	(Spain) Adrián	(Spain) Real Betis	Free	5 June 2013	
9	FW	(England) Andy Carroll	(England) Liverpool	Undisclosed	19 June 2013	
31	MF	(England) Danny Whitehead	(England) Stockport County	Undisclosed	20 June 2013	
23	MF	(England) Stewart Downing	(England) Liverpool	Undisclosed	13 August 2013	
30	FW	(Croatia) Mladen Petrić	Free agent	Free	10 September 2013	
24	FW	(England) Carlton Cole	Free agent	Free	14 October 2013	

==== Out ====
Pos	Player	To	Fee	Date	Notes
FW	(England) Carlton Cole	Free Agent	Free	22 May 2013	
DF	(Republic of Ireland) Eoin Wearen	Free Agent	Free	22 May 2013	
GK	(England) Jake Larkins	(England) Leyton Orient	Free	22 May 2013	
MF	(England) Declan Hunt	(England) Histon	Free	22 May 2013	
MF	(England) Jack Powell	(England) Chelsea	Free	22 May 2013	
DF	(Germany) Nigel Seidu	Free Agent	Free	22 May 2013	
DF	(England) Cheye Alexander	(England) Port Vale	Free	28 June 2013	
MF	(England) Robert Hall	(England) Bolton Wanderers	Compensation	1 July 2013	
DF	(England) Josh Siafa	(England) Millwall	Free	1 July 2013	
MF	(Italy) Jami Rafati	(Italy) Genoa	Free	11 July 2013	
MF	(England) Gary O'Neil	(England) Queens Park Rangers	Free	7 August 2013	
DF	(England) Jordan Spence	(England) Sheffield Wednesday	One-month loan	31 August 2013	
MF	(Wales) Jack Collison	(England) AFC Bournemouth	One-month loan	1 October 2013	
GK	(Republic of Ireland) Stephen Henderson	(England) AFC Bournemouth	Three-month loan	3 October 2013	
FW	(England) Elliot Lee	(England) Colchester United	One-month loan	22 October 2013	
FW	(England) Paul McCallum	(England) Torquay United	One-month loan	22 October 2013	
DF	(England) Jordan Spence	(England) MK Dons	Two-month loan	24 October 2013	
DF	(England) Dan Potts	(England) Portsmouth	One-month loan	20 November 2013	
DF	(England) Pelly Ruddock	(England) Luton Town	One-month loan	28 November 2013	
MF	(England) Blair Turgott	(England) Colchester United	One-month loan	28 November 2013	
FW	(Croatia) Mladen Petrić	Free Agent	Free	28 December 2013	

=== Winter ===
==== In ====
#	Pos	Player	From	Fee	Date	Notes
43	FW	(England) Jaanai Gordon	(England) Peterborough United	Undisclosed	1 January 2014	
28	DF	(England) Roger Johnson	(England) Wolverhampton Wanderers	End of season loan	6 January 2014	
47	MF	(Italy) Antonio Nocerino	(Italy) Milan	End of season loan	25 January 2014	
46	FW	(Italy) Marco Borriello	(Italy) Roma	End of season loan	25 January 2014	
	MF	(Ivory Coast) Abdul Razak	(Russia) Anzhi Makhachkala	Undisclosed	30 January 2014	
8	DF	(Colombia) Pablo Armero	(Italy) Napoli	End of season loan	31 January 2014	

==== Out ====
#	Pos	Player	To	Fee	Date	Notes
36	MF	(England) Blair Turgott	(England) Rotherham United	One-month loan	17 January 2014	
33	DF	(England) Pelly Ruddock	(England) Luton Town	Undisclosed	28 January 2014	
	DF	(England) Jordan Spence	(England) MK Dons	End of season loan	30 January 2014	
	FW	(England) Paul McCallum	(Scotland) Hearts	End of season loan	30 January 2014	
34	MF	(England) George Moncur	(Scotland) Partick Thistle	End of season loan	31 January 2014	
8	DF	(Romania) Răzvan Raț	Released	Contract terminated	31 January 2014	
11	FW	(Mali) Modibo Maïga	(England) QPR	End of season loan	31 January 2014	
	GK	(England) Sam Baxter	(England) Gillingham	Free	4 February 2014	
15	MF	(England) Ravel Morrison	(England) QPR	End of season loan	19 February 2014	
42	FW	(Republic of Ireland) Sean Maguire	(Republic of Ireland) Sligo Rovers	Loan ending July 31, 2014	22 February 2014	
10	MF	(Wales) Jack Collison	(England) Wigan Athletic	End of season loan	18 March 2014	
36	MF	(England) Blair Turgott	(England) Dagenham & Redbridge	End of season loan	27 March 2014	
