= Algarve Football Cup =

Annual association football tournament in Portugal

- Founded: 2001 (as Guadiana Trophy)
- Region: Europe
- Teams: 2–4
- Current champions: (Brazil) Flamengo (1st trophy)
- Most championships: (Portugal) Benfica (9 trophies)
- Website: Home page

The Algarve Football Cup or Algarve Trophy (Troféu do Algarve), previously known as Guadiana Trophy until 2013, is a pre-season friendly football tournament played in Algarve, Portugal (one edition was played in Spain). Benfica is the most successful team in the tournament, having won nine trophies in fourteen participations. Flamengo is the current champions, lifting the trophy in its 1st participation, in 2026.

== Tournaments ==
| Year | 1st | 2nd | 3rd | 4th |
Guadiana Trophy
| 2001 | (Portugal) Vitória de Guimarães | (Portugal) Farense | (Spain) Sevilla | —N/a |
| 2002 | (Portugal) Benfica | (Portugal) Vitória de Setúbal | —N/a | —N/a |
| 2003 | (Portugal) Belenenses | (Portugal) Benfica | —N/a | —N/a |
| 2004 | (Spain) Real Betis | (Portugal) Benfica | —N/a | —N/a |
| 2005 | (Portugal) Sporting CP | (Portugal) Vitória de Setúbal | (England) Middlesbrough | (Spain) Real Betis |
| 2006 | (Portugal) Sporting CP | (Spain) Deportivo La Coruña | (Portugal) Benfica | —N/a |
| 2007 | (Portugal) Benfica | (Spain) Real Betis | (Portugal) Sporting CP | —N/a |
| 2008 | (Portugal) Sporting CP | (England) Blackburn Rovers | (Portugal) Benfica | —N/a |
| 2009 | (Portugal) Benfica | (Portugal) Olhanense | (Belgium) Anderlecht | (Spain) Athletic Bilbao |
| 2010 | (Portugal) Benfica | (England) Aston Villa | (Netherlands) Feyenoord | —N/a |
| 2011 | (Portugal) Benfica | (Belgium) Anderlecht | (France) Paris Saint-Germain | —N/a |
| 2012 | (England) Newcastle United | (Greece) Olympiacos | (Portugal) Braga | —N/a |
| 2013 | (Portugal) Braga | (England) West Ham United | (Portugal) Sporting CP | —N/a |
Algarve Football Cup
| 2016 | (Portugal) Benfica | (Portugal) Vitória de Setúbal | (England) Derby County | —N/a |
| 2017 | (Portugal) Benfica | (Spain) Real Betis | —N/a | —N/a |
| 2018 | (France) Lille | (Portugal) Porto | (England) Everton | —N/a |
| 2022 | (Portugal) Benfica | (England) Fulham | (France) Nice | —N/a |
| 2023 | (Portugal) Benfica | (Spain) Celta Vigo | (Saudi Arabia) Al Nassr | —N/a |
| 2024 | (England) Fulham | (Portugal) Benfica | —N/a | —N/a |
| 2026 | (Brazil) Flamengo | (Portugal) Benfica | —N/a | —N/a |

== 2001 ==
The 2001 competition took place between 27 and 29 July 2001 and featured Farense, Vitória Guimarães and Sevilla. Vitória Guimarães won after the draw in the last match against Sevilla.

28 July 2001

| Vitória de Guimarães (Portugal) | 0–0 | (Spain) Sevilla |

Municipal de Vila Real de Santo António, Vila Real de Santo António

== 2002 ==
7 August 2002

| Benfica (Portugal) | 2–1 | (Portugal) Vitória de Setúbal |
|---|---|---|
| Roger 25', 47' | | Meyong 86' |

Complexo Desportivo de Vila Real de Santo António, Vila Real de Santo António

== 2003 ==
26 July 2003

| Belenenses (Portugal) | 2–2 | (Portugal) Benfica |
|---|---|---|
| Antchouet; Verona | | Argel; Cristiano 90' |
Penalties
| | 2–1 |

Complexo Desportivo de Vila Real de Santo António, Vila Real de Santo António

== 2004 ==
28 July 2004

| Real Betis (Spain) | 3–0 | (Portugal) Benfica |
|---|---|---|
| Fernando 6', 51', 53' |

Estadio Blas Infante, Ayamonte
Referee: Santana Ponce

== 2005 ==
The 2005 competition took place between 28 and 30 July 2005 and featured Sporting, Vitória Setubal, Middlesbrough and Betis. Sporting won in the final against Vitória Setubal.

30 July 2005

| Sporting CP (Portugal) | 2–1 | (Portugal) Vitória de Setúbal |
|---|---|---|
| J. Moutinho 50'; Varela 84' |

Estádio Algarve, Faro
Referee: Lucílio Baptista

== 2006 ==
The 2006 competition took place between 27 and 29 July 2006 and featured Benfica, Sporting and Deportivo La Coruña. Sporting won in the final against Deportivo.

29 July 2006

| Sporting CP (Portugal) | 1–0 | (Spain) Deportivo La Coruña |
|---|---|---|
| Deivid 26' |

Complexo Desportivo de Vila Real de Santo António, Vila Real de Santo António

== 2007 ==
The 2007 competition took place between 3 and 5 August 2007 and featured Benfica, Sporting and Real Betis. Benfica won in the final against rivals Sporting.

5 August 2007
21:15

| Benfica (Portugal) | 1–0 | (Portugal) Sporting CP |
|---|---|---|
| David Luiz 79' |

Complexo Desportivo de Vila Real de Santo António, Vila Real de Santo António
Referee: Pedro Henriques

== 2008 ==
The 2008 competition took place between 25 and 27 July 2009 and featured Benfica, Sporting and Blackburn Rovers. Sporting won in the final against Benfica.

27 July 2008
21:15

| Sporting CP (Portugal) | 2–0 | (Portugal) Benfica |
|---|---|---|
| Yannick 57'; Derlei 72' |

Complexo Desportivo de Vila Real de Santo António, Vila Real de Santo António
Referee: Nuno Almeida

== 2009 ==
The 2009 competition took place between 16 and 18 July 2009 and featured Benfica, Olhanense, Athletic Bilbao and Anderlecht. Benfica won in the final against Olhanense.

18 July 2009
21:15

| Benfica (Portugal) | 2–1 | (Portugal) Olhanense |
|---|---|---|
| Cardozo 64'; Miguel Vítor 90' | | Ukra 62' (pen.) |

Complexo Desportivo de Vila Real de Santo António, Vila Real de Santo António

== 2010 ==
The 2010 edition of the tournament took place between 30 July and 1 August 2010 and featured English side Aston Villa, alongside Dutch side Feyenoord and Benfica.

1 August 2010
21:15

| Benfica (Portugal) | 4–1 | (England) Aston Villa |
|---|---|---|
| David Luiz 10'; Saviola 37', 50'; Cardozo 43' | | Carew 68' |

Complexo Desportivo de Vila Real de Santo António, Vila Real de Santo António
Referee: João Capela

== 2011 ==
The 2011 competition took place between 15 and 17 July. It featured Benfica, Paris Saint-Germain and Anderlecht. Benfica won after a draw in the final match against Anderlecht.

17 July 2011
20:45

| Benfica (Portugal) | 2–2 | (Belgium) Anderlecht |
|---|---|---|
| Saviola 16'; Urretaviscaya 56' | | Lukaku 27'; Suárez 45' |

Complexo Desportivo de Vila Real de Santo António, Vila Real de Santo António
Referee: Duarte Gomes

== 2012 ==
The 2012 competition took place between 26 and 28 July. It featured Braga, Newcastle United and Olympiacos. Newcastle won in the final against Braga.

Prize Pot €4.5 million. Minimum €950,000 for all participants.

28 July 2012
20:45

| Newcastle United (England) | 2–1 | (Portugal) Braga |
|---|---|---|
| Ba 64'; R. Taylor 73' | Report | Amorim 68' |

Estádio Algarve, Faro
Referee: Paulo Baptista

== 2013 ==
The 2013 competition took place between 5 and 7 August 2013. It featured Sporting CP, West Ham United and Braga. Braga won in the final against Sporting.

7 August 2013
21:15

| Sporting CP (Portugal) | 0–1 | (Portugal) Braga |
|---|---|---|
| | | Edinho 52' |

Municipal de Portimão, Portimão
Referee: Ivo Santos

== 2016 ==
After a two-year hiatus, the competition returned with a new name. It took place between 14 and 16 July 2016 and featured Benfica, Vitória de Setúbal and Derby County. Benfica won in the final against Derby County.

16 July 2016
20:30 WEST

| Benfica (Portugal) | 4–0 | (England) Derby County |
|---|---|---|
| N. Semedo 16'; R. Fonte 54'; A. Almeida 63'; E. Salvio 90' | Report |

Estádio Algarve, Algarve
Referee: Pedro Oliveira

== 2017 ==
20 July 2017
20:30 WEST

| Benfica (Portugal) | 2–1 | (Spain) Real Betis |
|---|---|---|
| Seferovic 15', 50' | | Sergio León 32' |

Estádio Algarve, Faro/Loulé
Referee: Luís Godinho

== 2022 ==
15 July 2022
21:00 WEST

| Benfica (Portugal) | 3–0 | (France) Nice |
|---|---|---|
| R. Silva 7'; Otamendi 13'; Gilberto 36' |
Penalties
| Yaremchuk (penalty scored); Dias (penalty scored); A. Silva (penalty scored); Vertonghen (penalty scored); Pizzi (penalty scored) | 5–4 | (penalty scored) Claude-Maurice; (penalty scored) Trouillet; (penalty scored) Lotomba; (penalty scored) Brahimi; (penalty missed) Atal |

Estádio Algarve, Faro/Loulé
Referee: Hélder Malheiro

16 July 2022
20:15 WEST

| Nice (France) | 0–2 | (England) Fulham |
|---|---|---|
| | | Kebano 42' (pen.); Wilson 84' (pen.) |
Penalties
| Rosario (penalty missed); Bard (penalty scored); Mendy (penalty missed); Gouiri (penalty scored); Dante (penalty missed) | 2–3 | (penalty scored) Wilson; (penalty scored) Pereira; (penalty scored) Tiéhi; (penalty missed) Bryan; (penalty missed) Jasper |

Estádio Algarve, Faro/Loulé
Referee: Hélder Carvalho

17 July 2022
20:15 WEST

| Fulham (England) | 1–5 | (Portugal) Benfica |
|---|---|---|
| Mitrović 61' | | R. Silva 3'; Ramos 21', 29'; Yaremchuk 57'; H. Araújo 64' |

Estádio Algarve, Faro/Loulé
Attendance: ~15,000
Referee: Nuno Almeida

== 2023 ==
17 July 2023
20:30 WEST

| Celta Vigo (Spain) | 5–0 | (Saudi Arabia) Al Nassr |
|---|---|---|
| Alonso 57'; Larsen 61', 72', 74'; Rodríguez 70' |
Penalties
| Tapia (penalty scored); Larsen (penalty scored); Núñez (penalty scored); Swedberg (penalty missed); Baeza (penalty scored) | 4–4 | (penalty scored) Al-Khaibari; (penalty missed) Al-Sulaiheem; (penalty scored) Madu; (penalty scored) Adam; (penalty scored) Boushal |

Estádio Algarve, Faro/Loulé
Referee: António Nobre

20 July 2023
20:30 WEST

| Al Nassr (Saudi Arabia) | 1–4 | (Portugal) Benfica |
|---|---|---|
| Al-Ghannam 42' | | Di María 23'; Ramos 31', 39'; Schjelderup 68' |
Penalties
| Brozović (penalty scored); Ghareeb (penalty scored); Al-Ghannam (penalty scored); Lajami (penalty scored); Talisca (penalty scored) | 5–5 | (penalty scored) João Mário; (penalty scored) Chiquinho; (penalty scored) Aursnes; (penalty scored) T. Araújo; (penalty scored) Ristić |

Estádio Algarve, Faro/Loulé
Attendance: 17,516
Referee: Flávio Duarte

21 July 2023
20:30 WEST

| Benfica (Portugal) | 2–0 | (Spain) Celta Vigo |
|---|---|---|
| Di María 90' (pen.); Musa 90+1' |

Estádio Algarve, Faro/Loulé
Attendance: 14,822
Referee: Carlos Teixeira

== 2024 ==
2 August 2024
20:00 WEST

| Benfica (Portugal) | 0–1 | (England) Fulham |
|---|---|---|
| | | Iwobi 21' |

Estádio Algarve, Faro/Loulé
Referee: Fá Sanhá

== 2026 ==
11 July 2026
19:30 WEST

| Benfica (Portugal) | 1–2 | (Brazil) Flamengo |
|---|---|---|
| Pavlidis 45+7' (pen.) | | Samuel Lino 45+4' Wallace Yan 67' |

Estádio Algarve, Faro/Loulé
Referee: Fábio Veríssimo

== Number of wins ==
| Club | Winners | Runners-up |
|---|---|---|
| (Portugal) Benfica | 9 | 3 |
| (Portugal) Sporting CP | 3 | 0 |
| (Spain) Real Betis | 1 | 2 |
| (England) Fulham | 1 | 1 |
| (Portugal) Vitória de Guimarães (Portugal) Belenenses (England) Newcastle United (Portugal) Braga (France) Lille (Brazil) Flamengo | 1 | 0 |
| (Portugal) Vitória de Setúbal | 0 | 3 |
| (Portugal) Farense (Spain) Deportivo La Coruña (England) Blackburn Rovers (Portugal) Olhanense (England) Aston Villa (Belgium) Anderlecht (Greece) Olympiacos (England) West Ham United (Portugal) Porto (Spain) Celta Vigo | 0 | 1 |
