= 2005 Guadiana Trophy =

Portuguese football competition

The 2005 Guadiana Trophy was a Portuguese football competition that took place between 28 and 30 July 2005 and featured the clubs Sporting Clube de Portugal, Vitória de Setúbal, Middlesbrough, and Real Betis. Sporting won in the final against Vitória de Setúbal 2–0.

== Matches ==
=== Semi-finals ===
2005-07-28
2

Real Betis (Spain)	1 – 2	(Portugal) Vitória de Setúbal
Juanito 79'		Chaves 79'; Nandinho 26'

Estadio Blas Infante, Ayamonte
Referee: Santana Ponce

2005-07-28

Sporting CP (Portugal)	4 – 0	(England) Middlesbrough
Rochemback 17' 81'; Deivid 73'; Manoel 76'

Estádio do Portimonense, Portimão
Referee: Bruno Paixão

=== Third place match ===
2005-07-30

Middlesbrough (England)	0 – 0 (a.e.t.)	(Spain) Real Betis
Suárez 13' de Sutter 26'		de Marcos (?); Gurpeguí 60'
Penalties
Reiziger (penalty scored); Johnson (penalty scored); Doriva (penalty scored); Queudrue (penalty missed)	3–1	(penalty scored) Assunção; (penalty missed) Oliveira; (penalty missed) Fernando; (penalty missed) Rivera

Estádio Algarve, Faro
Referee: Nuno Almeida

=== Final ===
2005-07-30

Sporting CP (Portugal)	2 – 1	(Portugal) Vitória de Setúbal
J. Moutinho 50'; Varela 84'

Estádio Algarve, Faro
Referee: Lucílio Baptista
