= 2006–07 West Ham United F.C. season =

English football team season

West Ham United
2006–07 season
- Chairman: Terry Brown (until 21 November); Eggert Magnússon (from 21 November)
- Manager: Alan Pardew (until 11 December); Alan Curbishley (from 13 December)
- Stadium: Boleyn Ground
- Premier League: 15th
- FA Cup: Fourth round
- League Cup: Third round
- UEFA Cup: First round
- Top goalscorer: Bobby Zamora (11, all league)
- Average home league attendance: 34,719

During the 2006–07 English football season, West Ham United competed in the FA Premier League. They finished the season in 15th place.

== Season summary ==
West Ham started the 2006–07 campaign brightly, but slipped down the table due to off-field distractions. They were knocked out from UEFA Cup by the Italian Serie A side Palermo (4–0 on aggregate) and saw themselves dragged into the relegation zone.

Eventually an Icelandic consortium led by Eggert Magnússon bought the club on 26 November 2006. Following a poor run of form that left the club in 17th position, despite the signing of big name players Javier Mascherano and Carlos Tevez, the new owners sacked Alan Pardew, replacing him with former West Ham player Alan Curbishley who had recently ended a 15-year spell in charge of Charlton Athletic. West Ham won Curbishley's first game 1–0 at home against Manchester United, but went on to draw at fellow relegation strugglers Fulham, were crushed 6–0 at newly promoted Reading and were knocked out of the FA Cup by the bottom Premiership team, Watford. An end-to-end thriller at home to Tottenham Hotspur ended with West Ham losing 4–3 having been 3–2 in front with minutes to play, but the bright performance signified a change in form.

At the same time the signings of Mascherano and Tevez were being investigated by the Premier League, who were concerned that details regarding the transfers had been omitted from official records and whether the influence of MSI, led by Kia Joorabchian, breached Premier League rules regarding third party ownership of players. The media touted the idea that Tevez's contract could be terminated, possibly resulting in a deduction of points for playing an ineligible player. On 27 April 2007, West Ham pleaded guilty and were handed a record £5.5 million fine by the Premier League, but avoided a points deduction. Liverpool's signing of Mascherano was investigated and he was cleared to play after a two-week delay.

Following the verdict, Wigan Athletic's chairman Dave Whelan threatened legal action, supported by other relegation-threatened sides including Fulham and Sheffield United, saying "This is a very serious offence West Ham committed...They broke the law, told blatant lies and should have got a 10-point penalty. If we can sue West Ham or the Premier League, I am sure that will happen." Wigan's manager Paul Jewell suggested League officials had intimated they wished to see them relegated.

In a period that came to be known by the club's fans as "The Great Escape", West Ham avoided relegation by winning seven of their last nine games, including a 1–0 win over Arsenal, and on the last day of the season, defeating the Premiership champions Manchester United 1–0 (becoming the first team in the Premier League era to complete league doubles over Arsenal and Manchester United in the same season) to finish outside the relegation zone in 15th. Sheffield United, who were relegated, later sued West Ham for up to £30m, and an FA arbitration panel found in their favour. The two clubs settled out of court for an undisclosed sum in 2009.

== Final league table ==
Pos	Team	Pld	W	D	L	GF	GA	GD	Pts
13	Newcastle United	38	11	10	17	38	47	−9	43
14	Manchester City	38	11	9	18	29	44	−15	42
15	West Ham United	38	12	5	21	35	59	−24	41
16	Fulham	38	8	15	15	38	60	−22	39
17	Wigan Athletic	38	10	8	20	37	59	−22	38

Source: Barclays Premier League
Rules for classification: 1) points; 2) goal difference; 3) number of goals scored.

== Squad ==
Note: Flags indicate national team as defined under FIFA eligibility rules; some limited exceptions apply. Players may hold more than one non-FIFA nationality.

No.	Pos.	Nation	Player
1	GK	NIR	Roy Carroll
2	DF	AUS	Lucas Neill
3	DF	ENG	Paul Konchesky
4	DF	WAL	Danny Gabbidon
5	DF	ENG	Anton Ferdinand
6	DF	NIR	George McCartney
7	MF	SCO	Christian Dailly
8	FW	ENG	Teddy Sheringham
9	FW	ENG	Dean Ashton
10	FW	ENG	Marlon Harewood
11	MF	ENG	Matthew Etherington
12	FW	ENG	Carlton Cole
13	MF	POR	Luís Boa Morte
14	DF	GHA	John Paintsil
15	MF	ISR	Yossi Benayoun
17	MF	ENG	Hayden Mullins
18	DF	USA	Jonathan Spector

No.	Pos.	Nation	Player
19	DF	WAL	James Collins
20	MF	ENG	Nigel Reo-Coker (captain)
21	GK	ENG	Robert Green
22	MF	ENG	Tony Stokes
23	GK	ENG	Jimmy Walker
24	MF	ENG	Mark Noble
25	FW	ENG	Bobby Zamora
26	MF	ENG	Shaun Newton
27	DF	ENG	Calum Davenport
28	MF	ENG	Kyel Reid
29	MF	ENG	Lee Bowyer
30	DF	ENG	James Tomkins
31	GK	CZE	Marek Štěch
32	FW	ARG	Carlos Tevez
33	MF	SCO	Nigel Quashie
35	DF	ENG	Matthew Upson
37	FW	ESP	Kepa (on loan from Sevilla)

=== Left club during season ===
Note: Flags indicate national team as defined under FIFA eligibility rules; some limited exceptions apply. Players may hold more than one non-FIFA nationality.

No.	Pos.	Nation	Player
2	DF	ENG	Tyrone Mears (on loan to Derby County)
13	GK	ENG	Stephen Bywater (to Derby County)
13	GK	HUN	Gábor Király (on loan from Crystal Palace)

No.	Pos.	Nation	Player
16	MF	ARG	Javier Mascherano (to Liverpool)
27	FW	ENG	Hogan Ephraim (on loan to Colchester United)

== Results ==
=== Premier League ===
19 August 2006 1	West Ham United	3–1	Charlton Athletic	London
	Zamora 52', 66'; Cole 90'	Report	Bent 15'	Stadium: Boleyn Ground; Attendance: 34,937; Referee: Howard Webb

22 August 2006 2	Watford	1–1	West Ham United	Watford
	King 63'	Report	Zamora 65'	Stadium: Vicarage Road; Attendance: 18,344; Referee: Martin Atkinson

26 August 2006 3	Liverpool	2–1	West Ham United	Liverpool
	Agger 42'; Crouch 45'	Report	Zamora 12'	Stadium: Anfield; Attendance: 43,965; Referee: Alan Wiley

10 September 2006 4	West Ham United	1–1	Aston Villa	London
	Zamora 52'	Report	Ridgewell 4'	Stadium: Boleyn Ground; Attendance: 34,576; Referee: Steve Bennett

17 September 2006 5	West Ham United	0–2	Newcastle United	London
		Report	Duff 50'; Martins 75'	Stadium: Boleyn Ground; Attendance: 34,938; Referee: Rob Styles

23 September 2006 6	Manchester City	2–0	West Ham United	Manchester
	Samaras 50', 63'	Report		Stadium: City of Manchester Stadium; Attendance: 41,073; Referee: Chris Foy

1 October 2006 7	West Ham United	0–1	Reading	London
		Report	Ki-Hyeon 2'	Stadium: Boleyn Ground; Attendance: 34,872; Referee: Uriah Rennie

14 October 2006 8	Portsmouth	2–0	West Ham United	Portsmouth
	Kanu 24'; Cole 82'	Report		Stadium: Fratton Park; Attendance: 20,142; Referee: Graham Poll

22 October 2006 9	Tottenham Hotspur	1–0	West Ham United	London
	Mido 45'	Report		Stadium: White Hart Lane; Attendance: 36,162; Referee: Steve Bennett

29 October 2006 10	West Ham United	2–1	Blackburn Rovers	London
	Sheringham 21'; Mullins 80'	Report	Bentley 90'	Stadium: Boleyn Ground; Attendance: 33,833; Referee: Alan Wiley

5 November 2006 11	West Ham United	1–0	Arsenal	London
	Harewood 90'	Report		Stadium: Boleyn Ground; Attendance: 34,969; Referee: Rob Styles

11 November 2006 12	Middlesbrough	1–0	West Ham United	Middlesbrough
	Maccarone 74'	Report		Stadium: Riverside Stadium; Attendance: 25,898; Referee: Mark Halsey

18 November 2006 13	Chelsea	1–0	West Ham United	London
	Geremi 22'	Report		Stadium: Stamford Bridge; Attendance: 41,916; Referee: Mike Dean

25 November 2006 14	West Ham United	1–0	Sheffield United	London
	Mullins 36'	Report		Stadium: Boleyn Ground; Attendance: 34,454; Referee: Mike Riley

3 December 2006 15	Everton	2–0	West Ham United	Liverpool
16:00	Osman 51'; Vaughan 90'	Report		Stadium: Goodison Park; Attendance: 32,968; Referee: Martin Atkinson

6 December 2006 16	West Ham United	0–2	Wigan Athletic	London
		Report	Cotterill 51'; Spector 58' (o.g.)	Stadium: Boleyn Ground; Attendance: 33,805; Referee: Alan Wiley

9 December 2006 17	Bolton Wanderers	4–0	West Ham United	Bolton
	Davies 17', 52'; Diouf 77'; Anelka 78'	Report		Stadium: Reebok Stadium; Attendance: 22,283; Referee: Howard Webb

17 December 2006 18	West Ham United	1–0	Manchester United	London
16:00	Reo-Coker 75'	Report		Stadium: Boleyn Ground; Attendance: 34,966; Referee: Phil Dowd

23 December 2006 19	Fulham	0–0	West Ham United	London
		Report		Stadium: Craven Cottage; Attendance: 22,452; Referee: Chris Foy

26 December 2006 20	West Ham United	1–2	Portsmouth	London
	Sheringham 81'	Report	Primus 16', 38'	Stadium: Boleyn Ground; Attendance: 34,913; Referee: Martin Atkinson

30 December 2006 21	West Ham United	0–1	Manchester City	London
		Report	Beasley 83'	Stadium: Boleyn Ground; Attendance: 34,574; Referee: Steve Bennett

1 January 2007 22	Reading	6–0	West Ham United	Reading
	Gunnarsson 12'; Hunt 15'; Ferdinand 30' (o.g.); Doyle 36', 78'; Lita 53'	Report		Stadium: Madejski Stadium; Attendance: 24,073; Referee: Lee Mason

13 January 2007 23	West Ham United	3–3	Fulham	London
	Zamora 28'; Benayoun 46', 64'	Report	Radzinski 16'; McBride 59'; Christanval 90'	Stadium: Boleyn Ground; Attendance: 34,977; Referee: Graham Poll

20 January 2007 24	Newcastle United	2–2	West Ham United	Newcastle-upon-Tyne
	Milner 45'; Solano 53'	Report	Cole 18'; Harewood 22'	Stadium: St. James' Park; Attendance: 52,095; Referee: Uriah Rennie

30 January 2007 25	West Ham United	1–2	Liverpool	London
	Blanco 77'	Report	Kuyt 46'; Crouch 53'	Stadium: Boleyn Ground; Attendance: 34,966; Referee: Martin Atkinson

3 February 2007 26	Aston Villa	1–0	West Ham United	Birmingham
	Carew 36'	Report		Stadium: Villa Park; Attendance: 41,202; Referee: Chris Foy

10 February 2007 27	West Ham United	0–1	Watford	London
		Report	Henderson 12'	Stadium: Boleyn Ground; Attendance: 34,625; Referee: Alan Wiley

24 February 2007 28	Charlton Athletic	4–0	West Ham United	London
	Ambrose 24'; Thomas 34', 80'; Bent 41'	Report		Stadium: The Valley; Attendance: 27,111; Referee: Rob Styles

4 March 2007 29	West Ham United	3–4	Tottenham Hotspur	London
	Noble 16'; Tevez 41'; Zamora 85'	Report	Defoe 51'; Tainio 63'; Berbatov 89'; Stalteri 90'	Stadium: Boleyn Ground; Attendance: 34,966; Referee: Mike Dean

17 March 2007 30	Blackburn Rovers	1–2	West Ham United	Blackburn
	Samba 47'	Report	Tevez 71'; Zamora 75'	Stadium: Ewood Park; Attendance: 18,591; Referee: Howard Webb

31 March 2007 31	West Ham United	2–0	Middlesbrough	London
	Zamora 2'; Tevez 45'	Report		Stadium: Boleyn Ground; Attendance: 34,977; Referee: Mark Halsey

7 April 2007 32	Arsenal	0–1	West Ham United	London
		Report	Zamora 45'	Stadium: Emirates Stadium; Attendance: 60,098; Referee: Graham Poll

14 April 2007 33	Sheffield United	3–0	West Ham United	Sheffield
	Tonge 39'; Jagielka 68'; Stead 78'	Report		Stadium: Brammall Lane; Attendance: 31,593; Referee: Steve Bennett

18 April 2007 34	West Ham United	1–4	Chelsea	London
	Tevez 35'	Report	Wright-Phillips 31', 36'; Kalou 52'; Drogba 62'	Stadium: Boleyn Ground; Attendance: 34,966; Referee: Mike Dean

21 April 2007 35	West Ham United	1–0	Everton	London
	Zamora 13'	Report		Stadium: Boleyn Ground; Attendance: 34,945; Referee: Mark Clattenburg

28 April 2007 36	Wigan Athletic	0–3	West Ham United	Wigan
		Report	Boa Morte 30'; Benayoun 57'; Harewood 82'	Stadium: JJB Stadium; Attendance: 24,726; Referee: Graham Poll

5 May 2007 37	West Ham United	3–1	Bolton Wanderers	London
	Tevez 10', 21'; Noble 29'	Report	Speed 67'	Stadium: Boleyn Ground; Attendance: 34,404; Referee: Mike Riley

13 May 2007 38	Manchester United	0–1	West Ham United	Manchester
		Report	Tevez 45'	Stadium: Old Trafford; Attendance: 75,927; Referee: Martin Atkinson

=== League Cup ===
24 October 2006 Third round	Chesterfield	2–1	West Ham United	Chesterfield
	Larkin 54'; Folan 87'	Report	Harewood 4'	Stadium: Saltergate; Attendance: 7,787; Referee: Lee Probert

=== FA Cup ===
6 January 2007 Third round	West Ham United	3–0	Brighton & Hove Albion	London
	Noble 49'; Cole 58'; Mullins 90'	Report		Stadium: Boleyn Ground; Attendance: 32,874; Referee: Mark Halsey

27 January 2007 Fourth round	West Ham United	0–1	Watford	London
		Report	McNamee 42'	Stadium: Boleyn Ground; Attendance: 31,168; Referee: Howard Webb

=== UEFA Cup ===
14 September 2006 First round, first leg	West Ham United	0–1	(Italy) Palermo	London
		Report	Caracciolo 45'	Stadium: Boleyn Ground; Attendance: 32,222; Referee: Stefan Johannesson

28 September 2006 First round, second leg	(Italy) Palermo	3–0 (4–0 agg.)	West Ham United	Palermo, Italy
	Simplicio 35', 62'; Di Michele 68'	Report		Stadium: Stadio Renzo Barbera; Attendance: 19,284; Referee: Georgios Kasnaferis

== Statistics ==
=== Overview ===
Competition	Record							
Competition	P	W	D	L	GF	GA	GD	Win %
Premier League	38	12	5	21	35	59	−24	31.58
FA Cup	2	1	0	1	3	1	+2	50.00
League Cup	1	0	0	1	1	2	−1	0.00
UEFA Cup	2	0	0	2	0	4	−4	0.00
Total	43	13	5	25	39	66	−27	30.23

=== Goalscorers ===
Rank	Pos	No.	Nat	Name	Premier League	FA Cup	League Cup	UEFA Cup	Total
1	ST	25	(England)	Bobby Zamora	11	0	0	0	11
2	ST	32	(Argentina)	Carlos Tevez	7	0	0	0	7
3	ST	10	(England)	Marlon Harewood	3	0	1	0	4
4	ST	12	(England)	Carlton Cole	2	1	0	0	3
4	MF	15	(Israel)	Yossi Benayoun	3	0	0	0	3
4	MF	17	(England)	Hayden Mullins	2	1	0	0	3
4	MF	24	(England)	Mark Noble	2	1	0	0	3
8	ST	8	(England)	Teddy Sheringham	2	0	0	0	2
9	MF	13	(Portugal)	Luis Boa Morte	1	0	0	0	1
9	MF	20	(England)	Nigel Reo-Coker	1	0	0	0	1
9	ST	37	(Spain)	Kepa Blanco	1	0	0	0	1
Totals					35	3	1	0	39

=== League position by matchday ===
Matchday	1	2	3	4	5	6	7	8	9	10	11	12	13	14	15	16	17	18	19	20	21	22	23	24	25	26	27	28	29	30	31	32	33	34	35	36	37	38
Ground	H	A	A	H	H	A	H	A	A	H	H	A	A	H	A	H	A	H	A	H	H	A	H	A	H	A	H	A	H	A	H	A	A	H	H	A	H	A
Result	W	D	L	D	L	L	L	L	L	W	W	L	L	W	L	L	L	W	D	L	L	L	D	D	L	L	L	L	L	W	W	W	L	L	W	W	W	W
Position	2	1	4	8	11	15	16	18	19	16	15	16	16	15	17	18	18	18	18	18	18	18	18	18	18	18	18	19	20	19	19	19	19	19	19	18	17	15

A = Away; H = Home; W = Win; D = Draw; L = Loss

=== Appearances and goals ===
No.	Pos	Nat	Player	Total		Premier League		FA Cup		League Cup		UEFA Cup	
No.	Pos	Nat	Player	Apps	Goals	Apps	Goals	Apps	Goals	Apps	Goals	Apps	Goals
Goalkeepers
1	GK	(Northern Ireland) NIR	Roy Carroll	16	0	12	0	2	0	0	0	2	0
21	GK	(England) ENG	Robert Green	27	0	26	0	0	0	1	0	0	0
Defenders
2	DF	(Jamaica) JAM	Tyrone Mears	6	0	3+2	0	0	0	0	0	1	0
2	DF	(Australia) AUS	Lucas Neill	12	0	11	0	1	0	0	0	0	0
3	DF	(England) ENG	Paul Konchesky	25	0	22	0	0	0	0+1	0	2	0
4	DF	(Wales) WAL	Daniel Gabbidon	22	0	18	0	1	0	1	0	2	0
5	DF	(England) ENG	Anton Ferdinand	34	0	31	0	1	0	1	0	1	0
6	DF	(Northern Ireland) NIR	George McCartney	25	0	16+6	0	2	0	1	0	0	0
7	DF	(Scotland) SCO	Christian Dailly	17	0	10+4	0	2	0	1	0	0	0
14	DF	(Ghana) GHA	John Paintsil	7	0	3+2	0	0+1	0	1	0	0	0
18	DF	(United States) USA	Jonathan Spector	28	0	17+8	0	1+1	0	0	0	1	0
19	DF	(Wales) WAL	James Collins	17	0	16	0	0	0	0	0	1	0
27	DF	(England) ENG	Calum Davenport	6	0	5+1	0	0	0	0	0	0	0
35	DF	(England) ENG	Matthew Upson	2	0	2	0	0	0	0	0	0	0
Midfielders
11	MF	(England) ENG	Matthew Etherington	30	0	24+3	0	0+1	0	0+1	0	0+1	0
13	MF	(Portugal) POR	Luis Boa Morte	16	1	8+6	1	2	0	0	0	0	0
15	MF	(Israel) ISR	Yossi Benayoun	32	3	25+4	3	1	0	0	0	1+1	0
16	MF	(Argentina) ARG	Javier Mascherano	7	0	3+2	0	0	0	0	0	2	0
17	MF	(England) ENG	Hayden Mullins	32	3	21+9	2	1	1	1	0	0	0
20	MF	(England) ENG	Nigel Reo-Coker	39	1	35	1	1	0	1	0	2	0
24	MF	(England) ENG	Mark Noble	11	3	10	2	1	1	0	0	0	0
26	MF	(England) ENG	Shaun Newton	5	0	0+3	0	1+1	0	0	0	0	0
28	MF	(England) ENG	Kyel Reid	1	0	0	0	0	0	0	0	1	0
29	MF	(England) ENG	Lee Bowyer	22	0	18+2	0	0	0	0	0	2	0
33	MF	(Scotland) SCO	Nigel Quashie	8	0	7	0	1	0	0	0	0	0
Forwards
8	FW	(England) ENG	Teddy Sheringham	20	2	4+13	2	0+1	0	0+1	0	0+1	0
10	FW	(England) ENG	Marlon Harewood	35	4	19+13	3	0	0	1	1	1+1	0
12	FW	(England) ENG	Carlton Cole	21	3	5+12	2	2	1	0	0	1+1	0
25	FW	(England) ENG	Bobby Zamora	37	11	27+5	11	1+1	0	1	0	1+1	0
32	FW	(Argentina) ARG	Carlos Tevez	29	7	19+7	7	1	0	0	0	2	0
37	FW	(Spain) ESP	Kepa	8	1	1+7	1	0	0	0	0	0	0

== Transfers ==
=== In ===
Date	Pos.	Name	From	Fee
8 June 2006	MF	(England) Lee Bowyer	(England) Newcastle United	Undisclosed
15 June 2006	DF	(United States) Jonathan Spector	(England) Manchester United	£500,000
5 July 2006	ST	(England) Carlton Cole	(England) Chelsea	Undisclosed
6 July 2006	DF	(Jamaica) Tyrone Mears	(England) Preston North End	£1m
1 August 2006	DF	(Ghana) John Paintsil	(Israel) Hapoel Tel Aviv	£1m
8 August 2006	DF	(Northern Ireland) George McCartney	(England) Sunderland	£1m
16 August 2006	GK	(England) Robert Green	(England) Norwich City	£2m
31 August 2006	MF	(Argentina) Javier Mascherano	(Brazil) Corinthians	Undisclosed
31 August 2006	ST	(Argentina) Carlos Tevez	(Brazil) Corinthians	Undisclosed
31 August 2006	GK	(Czech Republic) Marek Štěch	(Czech Republic) Sparta Prague	Undisclosed
18 November 2006	GK	(Hungary) Gábor Király	(England) Crystal Palace	Loan
5 January 2007	MF	(Portugal) Luis Boa Morte	(England) Fulham	£5m
9 January 2007	MF	(Scotland) Nigel Quashie	(England) West Bromwich Albion	£1.75m
18 January 2007	DF	(England) Calum Davenport	(England) Tottenham Hotspur	Undisclosed
22 January 2007	DF	(Australia) Lucas Neill	(England) Blackburn Rovers	Undisclosed
22 January 2007	ST	(Spain) Kepa Blanco	(Spain) Sevilla	Loan
31 January 2007	DF	(England) Matthew Upson	(England) Birmingham City	£7.5m

=== Out ===
Date	Pos.	Name	To	Fee
14 June 2006	ST	(Israel) Yaniv Katan	(Israel) Maccabi Haifa	Loan
16 June 2006	DF	(England) Elliott Ward	(England) Coventry City	£1m
1 July 2006	GK	(England) Stephen Bywater	(England) Derby County	Undisclosed
1 July 2006	GK	(Trinidad and Tobago) Shaka Hislop	(United States) FC Dallas	Free
1 July 2006	DF	(Australia) Trent McClenahan	(England) Hereford United	Free
1 July 2006	DF	(England) Chris Cohen	(England) Yeovil Town	Free
1 July 2006	MF	(France) Sekou Baradji	(France) Tours	Free
1 July 2006	ST	(Czech Republic) Petr Mikolanda	(Czech Republic) Mladá Boleslav	Free
29 July 2006	MF	(Wales) Carl Fletcher	(England) Crystal Palace	£400,000
8 August 2006	DF	(Republic of Ireland) Clive Clarke	(England) Sunderland	£400,000
18 August 2006	MF	(England) Mark Noble	(England) Ipswich Town	Loan
31 January 2007	MF	(Argentina) Javier Mascherano	(England) Liverpool	Undisclosed
31 January 2007	DF	(Jamaica) Tyrone Mears	(England) Derby County	Loan
10 March 2007	MF	(England) Shaun Newton	(England) Leicester City	Loan
