= Mark Noble =

English footballer (born 1987)

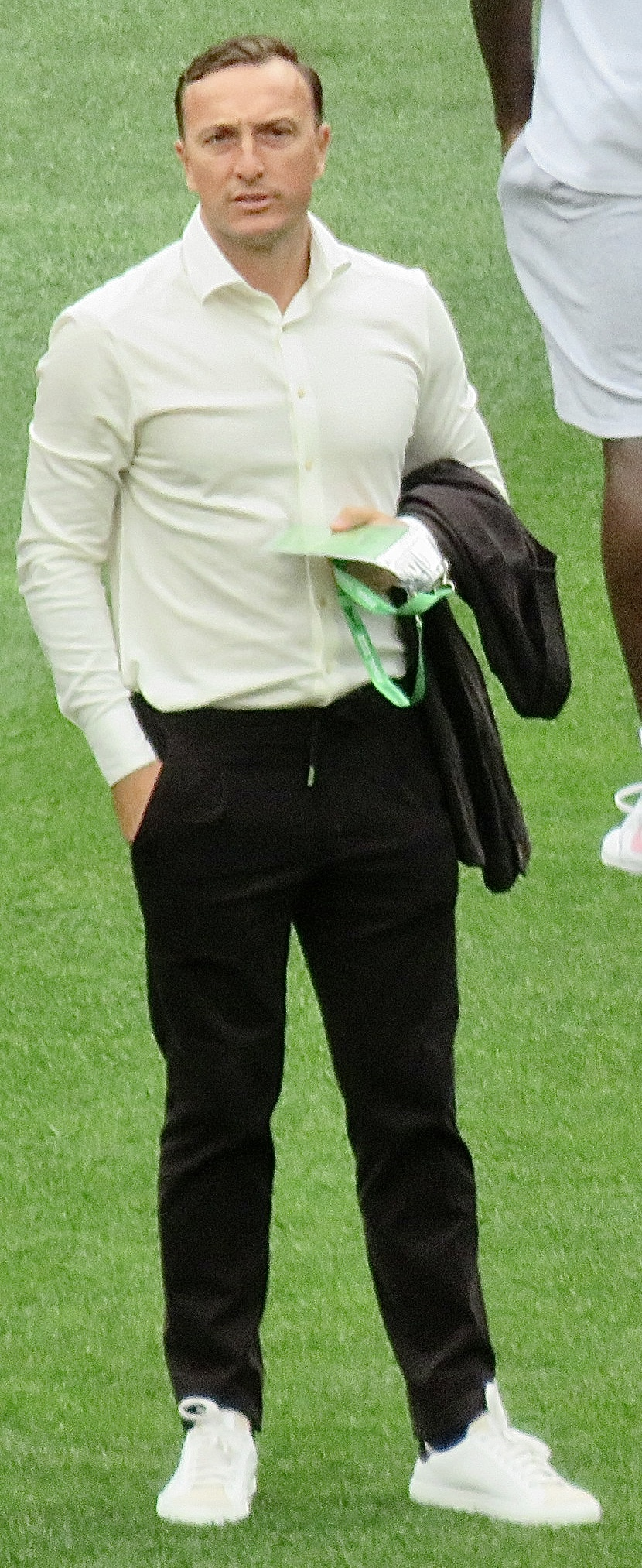
- Noble in 2023

Personal information
- Full name: Mark James Noble
- Date of birth: 8 May 1987 (age 39)
- Place of birth: Canning Town, London, England
- Height: 5 ft 11 in (1.80 m)
- Position: Central midfielder

Team information
- Current team: West Ham United (Sporting Director)

Youth career
- Barking Colts
- 1998–2000: Arsenal
- 2000–2004: West Ham United

Senior career*
Years	Team	Apps	(Gls)
2004–2022	West Ham United	472	(55)
2006	→ Hull City (loan)	5	(0)
2006	→ Ipswich Town (loan)	13	(1)
Total		490	(56)

International career
2002	England U16	7	(0)
2003–2004	England U17	12	(0)
2004	England U18	1	(0)
2005	England U19	7	(0)
2007–2009	England U21	20	(3)
Medal record
Men's football
Representing England
UEFA European Under-21 Championship
Runner-up	2009
Bronze medal – third place	2007
UEFA European Under-19 Championship
Runner-up	2005
- * Club domestic league appearances and goals

Mark James Noble (born 8 May 1987) is an English football executive and former player who is the sporting director of EFL Championship club West Ham United. A fan of the club since childhood, Noble spent eighteen years with West Ham playing as a central midfielder, serving as club captain for seven years, before retiring at the end of the 2021–22 season. Aside from two brief loan spells at Hull City and Ipswich Town, Noble played all of his first team matches for the club, earning him the nickname "Mr West Ham".

Noble has the most Premier League appearances for West Ham, in addition to being the longest serving player in the squad at the time of his retirement, having been in the first team since 2004. He won the club's Hammer of the Year trophy twice, as well as being voted Hammer of the Decade at the end of the 2010s.

Noble represented England at U16, U17, U18, U19 and U21 levels, captaining the U21 side, scoring three goals in 20 games.

Known for his proficiency in scoring penalty kicks, in 2020, Noble was rated as the player with the second highest conversion rate for penalties in the world over the last 20 years. His 90.5% conversion rate was only beaten by Robert Lewandowski's rate of 91.1%.

After his retirement from professional football, Noble returned to West Ham as sporting director in January 2023.

== Club career ==
=== Early career ===
Born in Canning Town, East London, Noble played for Barking Colts and moved to Arsenal's academy at age 11. His father, however, who would drive him to training, could not always arrange the time to get Noble to training sessions due to the distance between their home in Beckton and Arsenal's academy in Hale End. Noble supported local club West Ham United as a boy, and grew up just one mile away from Upton Park. Eventually, the club showed an interest in him and Noble signed as a youth player in 2000. He became the youngest player ever to appear in their reserve team, aged 15. He became a trainee in July 2003 and made his debut in the senior team at the age of just 17 in the League Cup on 24 August 2004 in a 2–0 win against Southend United, replacing Luke Chadwick for the final 22 minutes of the game.

On 8 January 2005, on his third appearance for West Ham, Noble made his first start for the club, playing the full 90 minutes in a 1–0 FA Cup third round win against Norwich City. He made his league debut in the Championship a week later, 15 January 2005, in a 4–2 defeat away at Wolverhampton Wanderers. On 30 May 2005, Noble played in the 2005 Football League Championship play-off final which saw West Ham beat Preston North End 1–0 to secure a return to the Premier League. He had entered the game as an 83rd-minute substitute for Shaun Newton.

We think very highly of Mark. If he keeps on working hard and continues to develop as he has, there is no reason why he can't become a top player for this club.

— Alan Pardew, 2005

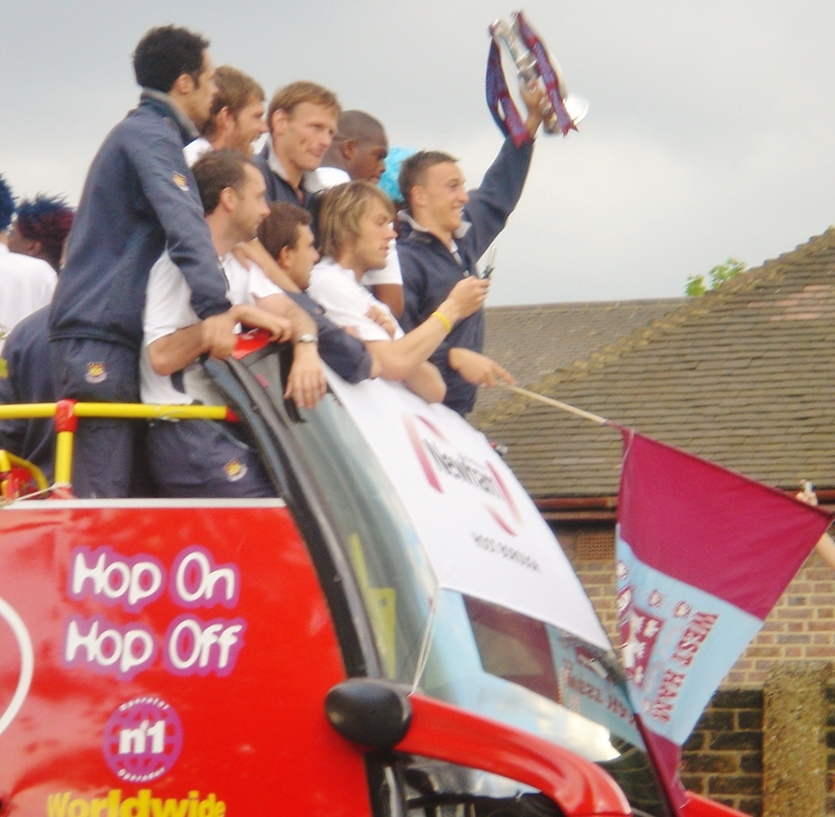
Open top bus for winners of 2005 Football League Championship play-off final. Noble with trophy and flag

Noble won the Young Hammer of the Year and the runner-up to the Hammer of the Year awards despite making his debut only four months previously.

Upon West Ham's return to the Premier League, he featured in only five League games in the 2005–06 season, including those against Tottenham Hotspur on 20 November 2005 and against Manchester United on 27 November, but after a game against Blackburn Rovers on 10 December, he found regular playing time harder to come by and was sent out on loan. He did not play for West Ham at all in 2006.

==== Loan periods ====
Noble was subsequently loaned to Hull City by manager Alan Pardew in order for him to get some games. He made five appearances, his debut coming on 18 February 2006 in a 1–0 away defeat by Cardiff City. Noble's loan ended early after he suffered an injury to his lower back.

Noble signed a three-month loan in August 2006 with Ipswich Town in the hope of gaining necessary first-team experience. He played 13 games in the Championship under manager, Jim Magilton and scored his first professional goal on 12 September in a 2–1 home win over Coventry City.

=== Return to West Ham ===
Noble scored his first goal for West Ham against Brighton & Hove Albion, the side's first of three in a 3–0 home win in January 2007 in the third round of the FA Cup, from an assist by Carlos Tevez. On 4 March, he scored his first Premiership goal and the opening goal of the game, against Tottenham at Upton Park in a game West Ham eventually lost 4–3 in the final seconds. He played 11 games in all competitions, scoring three goals in the 2006–07 season.

==== 2007–08 season ====
Noble established his place in Alan Curbishley's side during the 2007–08 season, starting nearly all games when fit. He scored his first penalty for the club on 18 August 2007 in a 1–0 away win against Birmingham City after Colin Doyle had fouled Craig Bellamy. He was out for several weeks in November 2007 after he had played through an injury for the last several months without letting the medical staff know. In January 2008, Noble scored the only goal in a 1–0 victory over Liverpool from the penalty spot, after Liverpool defender Jamie Carragher had brought down Freddie Ljungberg in the last few seconds of second-half added time. His performance in the match was described as "exceptional".

==== 2008–09 season ====
The 2008–09 season did not start well for Noble, as he was sent off for two bookable offences in a 3–0 loss away at Manchester City, the first away game of the season. After serving his suspension he came back to score an equaliser against West Bromwich Albion after West Ham went a goal down with West Brom coming back to win 3–2. This was one of five goals he scored in the season with three coming from the penalty spot. After Alan Curbishley left in September, he remained in the first team under new manager Gianfranco Zola. He celebrated his 100th appearance for the Hammers by scoring against Blackburn at Ewood Park on 21 March 2009 to secure a 1–1 draw. In April, he signed a contract extension tying him to the club until 2013.

==== 2009–10 season ====
Noble began the 2009–10 season well, scoring West Ham's first goal of the new season, in a 2–0 win over Premier League newcomers Wolves. Under Gianfranco Zola, Noble established himself in central midfield in a diamond that included Scott Parker as his partner and Jack Collison and Valon Behrami on the wings. He would only score one other goal during the season – a penalty after Habib Beye had fouled Zavon Hines – in a 2–1 home win against Aston Villa on 4 November 2009.

==== 2010–11 season ====
With West Ham now managed by Avram Grant, Noble continued to be a regular member of the first team. He played 26 of a possible 38 games in the Premier League missing a month of the season after an appendectomy as West Ham were relegated after finishing in 20th and bottom place. He scored four league goals; all were penalties including two in one game. On 2 April 2011 against Manchester United his two penalties had put West Ham 2–0 up only for Wayne Rooney to score a hat-trick which, with another goal by Javier Hernández, won the game 4–2 for Manchester United.

==== 2011–12 season ====
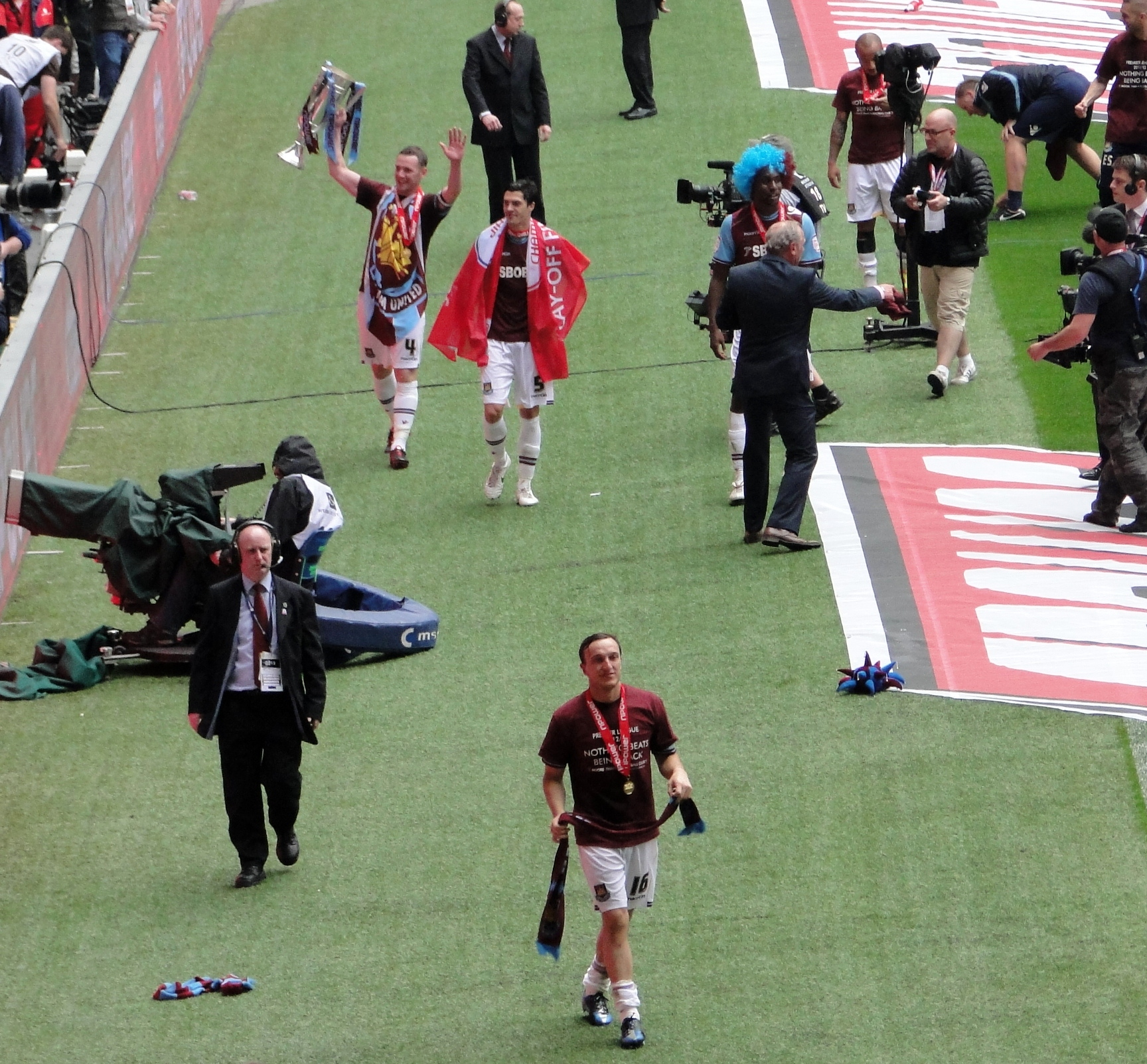
Noble (front) after the 2012 Football League Championship play-off final

During the 2011–12 season with West Ham now back in the Championship, Noble scored eight goals, seven of which were penalties, his only goal from open play coming in a 4–0 away win against Barnsley. Having twice previously been runner-up, Noble was named Hammer of the Year for the 2011–12 season. In May 2012 Noble played in the 2012 Football League Championship play-off final at Wembley Stadium against Blackpool which West Ham won 2–1 to return to the Premier League after a one-year absence. By the end of the season, he had played 49 games in all competitions, missing just one of their Championship games.

==== 2012–13 season ====
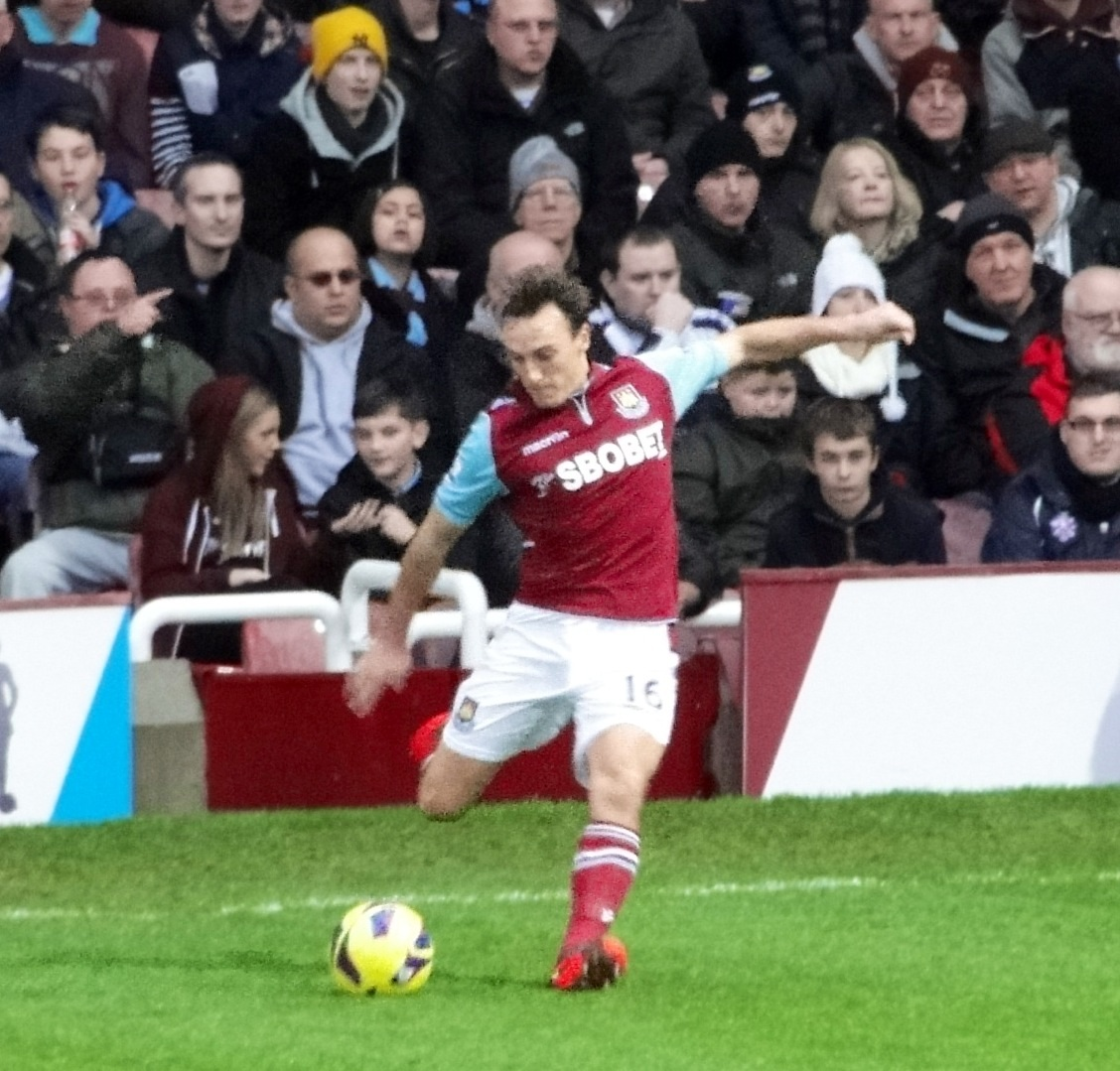
Mark Noble takes a free kick during the 2012–13 season

In September 2012, Noble signed a new three-year contract with an option for a further two years. In February 2013, he was out injured after having been diagnosed with a compression of the thoracic outlet. He did not return until 17 April 2013 in a 2–2 home draw against Manchester United. The missing games saw Noble's tally for the season at 31 games in all competitions with four goals scored. Three goals were penalties with his one-goal from open play coming in a 4–1 home win against Southampton on 20 October 2012.

==== 2013–14 season ====
Noble scored three goals in the 2013–14 season, the only one from open play being the second goal in a 2–0 away win over Cardiff City in January, despite the team being down to ten men after a James Tomkins sending off. On 6 May 2014, Noble received his second Hammer of the Year, beating runner up Adrián and third-placed James Tomkins. On the same awards night, Noble also won the Players' Player of the Year accolade.

==== 2014–15 season ====
Noble missed a penalty in a 0–1 home defeat by Tottenham on 16 August 2014, the opening game of the season, but scored his first goal of the season in the next home game, on 30 August, a 1–3 home defeat by Southampton. On 29 November 2014, Noble became West Ham's record appearance maker in the Premier League with his appearance against Newcastle United being his 205th Premier League game, overtaking Steve Potts. Noble signed a contract extension which would keep him at West Ham until 2020, with an option for a further year, on 26 February 2015.

==== 2015–16 season and testimonial ====
Noble's first goal of the season came from the penalty spot in a 3–4 home defeat by Premier League newcomers, AFC Bournemouth on 22 August 2015. The following week, he scored the second goal in a 3–0 away win against Liverpool; this was West Ham's first win at Anfield since 1963. On 14 September 2015, following the departure of Kevin Nolan, Noble was named club captain. Noble made his 350th senior appearance for West Ham on 6 February 2016, in a 1–0 defeat away at Southampton. The following week, he scored his third goal of the season, netting West Ham's equalizer in the 77th minute of their 2–2 draw away at Norwich City. On 22 December 2015, it had been announced that Noble was to be granted a testimonial by West Ham following his long service to the club. The game was played on 28 March 2016 between a West Ham XI and a West Ham United all-stars team made up of former players, with all proceeds going to charity. The game was won 6–5 by the West Ham XI in front of 36,000 spectators and featured a goal by Paolo Di Canio and two by Dean Ashton, including a bicycle kick described as "stunning".

On 10 May 2016, Noble became the final man to lead a West Ham United team out at Upton Park, as the Hammers went on to win their final game at their former home 3–2 against Manchester United.

==== 2016–17 season ====
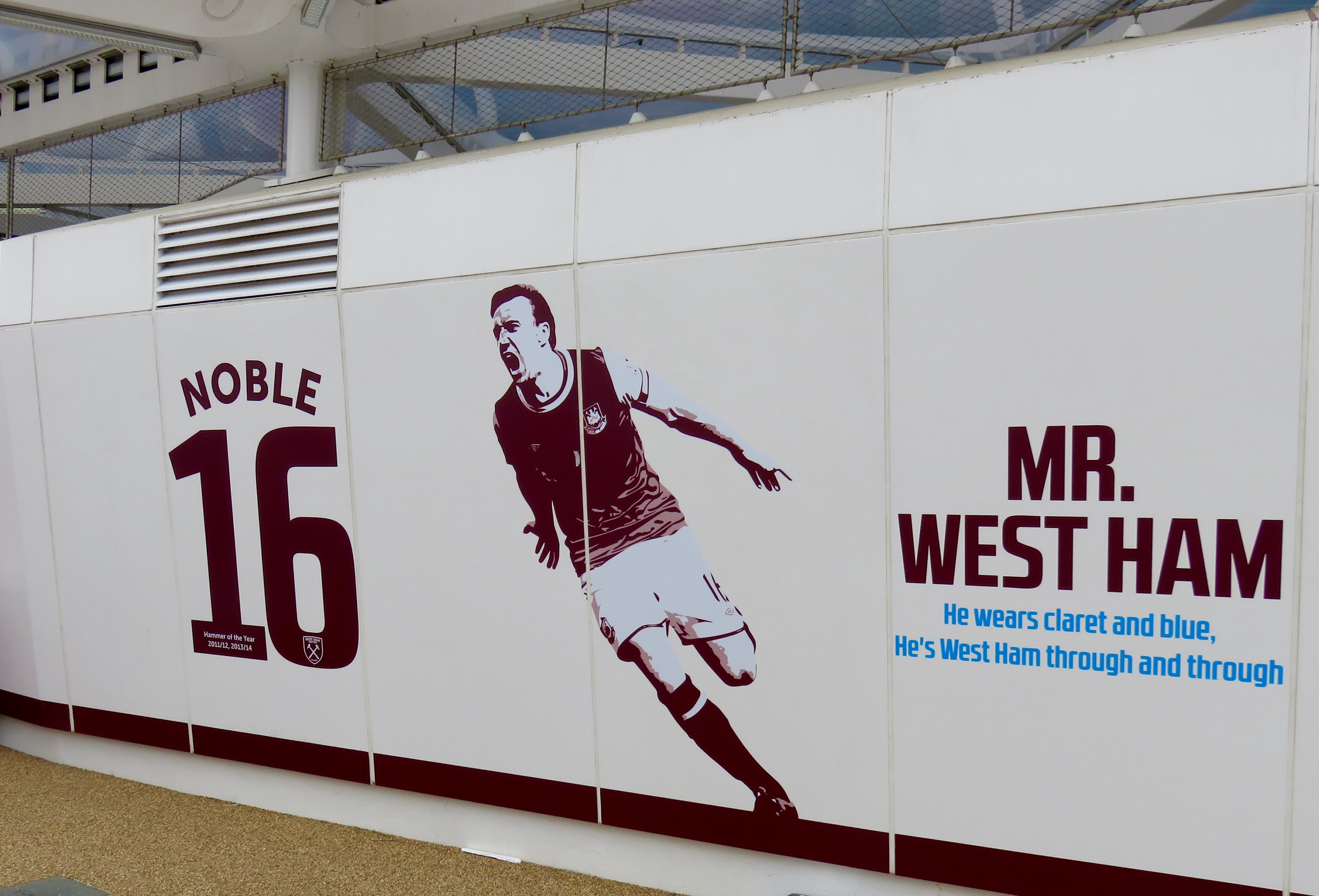
A mural of Noble at the London Stadium

In March 2017 sections of West Ham supporters called for him to be dropped from the team. Noble described the season as "the most difficult of his career". On 8 April 2017, having played against Swansea City, Noble marked his 400th appearance for West Ham becoming the 19th player to pass this number. He played 35 games in all competitions for West Ham in the 2016–17 season scoring five goals, two in the Europa League and three in the Premier League. His season finished early with two games remaining for West Ham as he required an abdominal operation.

==== 2017–18 season ====
Noble marked his 300th Premier League appearance with a goal from the penalty spot against Stoke City on 16 December 2017. In March 2018, there were protests against David Sullivan and the West Ham United board at the London Stadium during a 3–0 home defeat to Burnley. There were four pitch invasions with one fan approaching Noble on the pitch. In scenes described as "horrific", Noble grappled with the supporter, throwing him to the ground. On 5 May 2018, he scored the second goal in a 2–0 away win at Leicester City, a result which ensured West Ham's survival in the Premier League. Noble described the goal, a volley from the edge of the penalty area, as "the best of his career".

==== 2018–19 season ====
Noble scored his first goal of the season on 9 February 2019, a penalty past Vicente Guaita of Crystal Palace after he had fouled Michail Antonio in the area. The game finished 1–1. Noble finished the season with five goals, including a brace on the final day of the season in a 4–1 win against Watford.

==== 2019–20 season ====
Noble missed the first two games of the season due to injury, but started in the third game of the season, against Watford, scoring a third-minute penalty in a 3–1 win, the Hammers' first win of the season. This was his 25th successful Premier League penalty, with only Shearer (56), Lampard (43) and Gerrard (32) scoring more. Noble marked his 500th appearance for West Ham on 17 July, earning an assist in a 3–1 win over Watford.

==== 2020–21 season ====
A week before the start of the 2020–21 season, Noble, as club captain, voiced his anger at the sale of West Ham player Grady Diangana. On Twitter, Noble wrote "As captain of this football club I'm gutted, angry and sad that Grady has left, great kid with a great future". His views were supported by defender Arthur Masuaku and many West Ham fans who expressed dissatisfaction with club owners David Sullivan and David Gold.

Noble signed a new one-year contract on 9 March 2021, and announced that the 2021–22 season would be his final stint as a West Ham player. On 10 April 2021, in a 3–2 home win against Leicester City, Noble made his 400th Premier League appearance.

==== 2021–22 season ====
On 16 September 2021, Noble came on as an 83rd-minute substitute for goal scorer and vice-captain – and captain of the fixture until being replaced – Declan Rice in a 2–0 away win over Dinamo Zagreb, making his first Europa League group stage appearance and his seventh European appearance for the club overall.

On 19 September, in the last minute of the game he had a penalty kick saved by David de Gea in a 2–1 loss against Manchester United after being substituted on just seconds before. On 25 November, Noble scored a penalty in a 2–0 Europa League tie against Rapid Wien, marking his third European goal for the club. The win confirmed West Ham winning group H. On 28 December, Noble started his first Premier League game of the season, in an away game to Watford. West Ham won 4–1 with Noble scoring the third goal, a penalty, marking his 47th Premier League goal, placing him level with Paolo Di Canio as West Ham's second highest scorer of Premier League goals.

In May 2022, West Ham announced that the Young Hammer of the Year award would be renamed the "Mark Noble Award" in honour of the player.

Noble played his last home game for West Ham on 15 May in a 2–2 draw with Premier League champions, Manchester City. He came on as a 77th-minute substitute in front of a sellout stadium. In the 16th minute of the match, there was a standing ovation from both sets of fans for Noble, who wore the 16 shirt for the club. West Ham marked the occasion with a film with a voiceover from Danny Dyer and Ben Shephard presenting on the pitch. At the end of the game, City manager Pep Guardiola hugged Noble. Albert II, Prince of Monaco, head of the House of Grimaldi and an admirer of West Ham, was in attendance to pay his respects to the player. Following the game, Noble was given a farewell by fellow players and supporters on the pitch. On 20 May 2022, West Ham named their new academy pitch at Chadwell Heath, the "Mark Noble Arena".

On 22 May 2022, Noble made his final appearance for the club, in a 3–1 loss against Brighton & Hove Albion, coming on as an 81st-minute substitute. In total, Noble made 550 appearances for West Ham, 414 of those coming in the Premier League, scoring 62 goals.

== International career ==
Noble captained the England U18 team. He was a member of the England U19 team that beat Serbia and Montenegro U19s 3–1 in the 2005 European Championship semi-finals, although they subsequently lost the final to France.

Noble made his debut for the England U21 team on 11 June 2007, coming on as substitute in the 82nd minute for Tom Huddlestone in England's 0–0 draw with the Czech Republic during the 2007 UEFA European Under-21 Championship, held in the Netherlands. He established himself in the starting XI for the remaining matches and scored twice in a dramatic semi-final penalty shootout against the Netherlands where England lost 13–12. On 11 September 2007, Noble scored his first international goal for the under-21 team against Bulgaria in a 2–0 victory, followed by two more against the Republic of Ireland on 16 October.

Noble captained the U21s at the 2009 European Championships as regular captain Steven Taylor had to withdraw due to injury. The Young Lions ended the tournament as runners-up, losing 4–0 to Germany, with Noble playing his last match for the U21s.

Noble was also eligible to play for the Republic of Ireland national side through his County Cork-born grandparents. In August 2014, despite stating on numerous occasions about his ambition of playing for England at senior level, it was reported by the Irish Independent that he might have been willing to make himself available for the Irish national team.

Despite previous reports claiming Noble would accept a call up from Ireland, in February 2017 Noble rejected a call up to the Irish national side, stating: "There are young Irish kids playing well that deserve and would appreciate an Irish cap more than I would. I played through all the age groups as a youth international (with England), went to tournaments and sang the national anthem. But obviously I've never got a senior cap. So for me to turn up to play for Ireland without it having been a dream of mine, and there's an Irish kid out there who might miss out when it's their dream to play for Ireland, I couldn't do that."

== After football ==
In September 2022, it was announced that Noble would return to West Ham United as a sporting director from January 2023. He attended his first match as sporting director, a Premier League match fixture Leeds United which ended in a 2–2 draw, on 4 January 2023. He also plays a key role in overseeing the development of the club's young players/academy.

Following West Hams 2–1 victory over Fiorentina in 2023 UEFA Europa Conference League final, Declan Rice walked over to Noble and handed him the trophy, Noble then lifted it in front of cheering West Ham fans in-front of him. Noble then told a reporter 'I'm lost for words, since 11 I've been at the club. It is just amazing to see the smile on their faces we have been through such pain. I am just lost for words.

On 3 November 2026, alongside Steve Potts and Gerard Prenderville, Noble was announced as joint-interim manager of West Ham United following the sacking of Nuno Espírito Santo. A day later, Scott Parker was announced as the new permanent manager, with Noble in a new role working closer with the first team.

== Personal life ==
Boleyn Boy
- Author: Mark Noble
- Publisher: HarperCollins
- Publication date: 10 November 2022
- Media type: Autobiography

Noble has been married to childhood sweetheart Carly since 2012. The couple have a son and a daughter. Their son, Lenny, plays at the West Ham United academy based in Chadwell Heath.

In May 2016, Noble was granted freedom of the London Borough of Newham for his services to the borough. That same year Noble alongside Rio Ferdinand and Bobby Zamora established the Legacy Foundation, a charity that aims to deliver social and affordable housing for Local Authorities.

Noble is also an avid supporter of youth/local grassroots football and during his playing days he hosted his own football camps in Essex, emphasizing fun, mental health, and community over elite development.

In April 2020, during the COVID-19 pandemic, Noble donated £35,000 to help vulnerable people in Essex.

In November 2022, his autobiography, Boleyn Boy was published by HarperCollins. That same month Noble was honored by the city of London, being awarded the Freedom of the City of London.

In March 2023, Noble received the Outstanding Contribution to London Football award at the forthcoming 2023 London Football Awards.

== Career statistics ==
Appearances and goals by club, season and competition
Club	Season	League			FA Cup		League Cup		Europe		Other		Total	
Club	Season	Division	Apps	Goals	Apps	Goals	Apps	Goals	Apps	Goals	Apps	Goals	Apps	Goals
West Ham United	2004–05	Championship	13	0	3	0	2	0	—		3 (Note: Appearances in Championship play-offs)	0	21	0
West Ham United	2005–06	Premier League	5	0	0	0	1	0	—		—		6	0
West Ham United	2006–07	Premier League	10	2	1	1	—		—		—		11	3
West Ham United	2007–08	Premier League	31	3	2	0	3	0	—		—		36	3
West Ham United	2008–09	Premier League	29	3	4	2	1	0	—		—		34	5
West Ham United	2009–10	Premier League	27	2	0	0	1	0	—		—		28	2
West Ham United	2010–11	Premier League	26	4	4	0	5	1	—		—		35	5
West Ham United	2011–12	Championship	45	8	0	0	0	0	—		3	0	48	8
West Ham United	2012–13	Premier League	28	4	1	0	1	0	—		—		30	4
West Ham United	2013–14	Premier League	38	3	0	0	1	0	—		—		39	3
West Ham United	2014–15	Premier League	28	2	4	0	1	0	—		—		33	2
West Ham United	2015–16	Premier League	37	7	5	0	1	0	3 (Note: Appearances in UEFA Europa League)	0	—		46	7
West Ham United	2016–17	Premier League	30	3	1	0	1	0	3	2	—		35	5
West Ham United	2017–18	Premier League	29	4	1	0	3	0	—		—		33	4
West Ham United	2018–19	Premier League	31	5	1	0	0	0	—		—		32	5
West Ham United	2019–20	Premier League	33	4	2	0	1	0	—		—		35	4
West Ham United	2020–21	Premier League	21	0	3	0	1	0	—		—		25	0
West Ham United	2021–22	Premier League	11	1	1	0	2	0	9	1	—		23	2
West Ham United	Total		472	55	32	3	25	1	18	3	3	0	550	62
Hull City (loan)	2005–06	Championship	5	0	—		—		—		—		5	0
Ipswich Town (loan)	2006–07	Championship	13	1	—		0	0	—		—		13	1
Career total			490	56	32	3	25	1	18	3	3	0	568	63

== Honours ==
West Ham United

- Football League Championship play-offs: 2005, 2012

England U19

- UEFA European Under-19 Championship runner-up: 2005

England U21

- UEFA European Under-21 Championship runner-up: 2009

Individual

- PFA Team of the Year: 2011–12 Championship
- West Ham United Hammer of the Year: 2011–12, 2013–14
- West Ham United Young Hammer of the Year: 2004–05
- West Ham United Hammer of the Decade (2010s): 2010–19
