= Ravel Morrison =

Jamaica international footballer (born 1993)

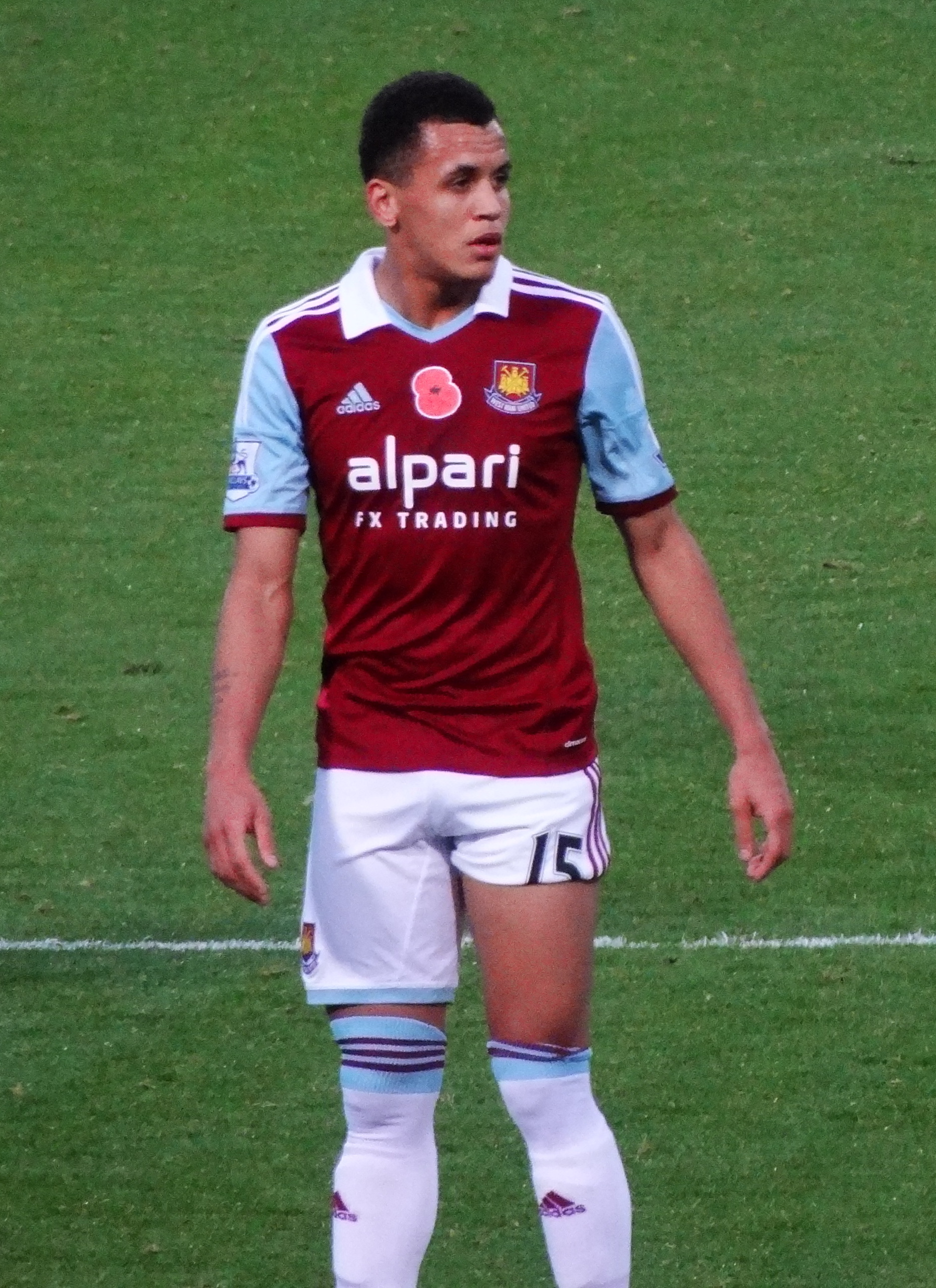
- Morrison playing for West Ham United in 2013

Personal information
- Full name: Ravel Ryan Morrison
- Date of birth: 2 February 1993 (age 33)
- Place of birth: Wythenshawe, Manchester, England
- Height: 5 ft 9 in (1.75 m)
- Position: Midfielder

Team information
- Current team: Arabian Falcons
- Number: 11

Youth career
- Fletcher Moss Rangers
- –2010: Manchester United

Senior career*
Years	Team	Apps	(Gls)
2010–2012	Manchester United	0	(0)
2012–2015	West Ham United	18	(3)
2012–2013	→ Birmingham City (loan)	27	(3)
2014	→ Queens Park Rangers (loan)	15	(6)
2014	→ Cardiff City (loan)	7	(0)
2015–2019	Lazio	4	(0)
2017	→ Queens Park Rangers (loan)	5	(0)
2017–2018	→ Atlas (loan)	18	(3)
2019	Östersund	6	(0)
2019–2020	Sheffield United	1	(0)
2020	→ Middlesbrough (loan)	3	(0)
2020–2021	ADO Den Haag	4	(0)
2021–2022	Derby County	36	(4)
2022–2023	D.C. United	14	(2)
2024–2025	Precision	20	(9)
2025–	Arabian Falcons	31	(3)

International career^{‡}
2008	England U16	1	(1)
2009	England U17	3	(0)
2010	England U18	1	(0)
2013–2014	England U21	4	(2)
2020–	Jamaica	21	(2)
- * Club domestic league appearances and goals as of 18:01, 16 November 2026 (UTC) ‡ National team caps and goals as of 15:31, 10 June 2025 (UTC)

Ravel Ryan Morrison (born 2 February 1993) is a professional footballer who plays as a midfielder for UAE Second Division League club Arabian Falcons and the Jamaica national team.

Morrison rose through the youth ranks at Manchester United where he was considered as one of their most promising talents and touted as a wonderkid. His football career has been hindered by legal issues and disciplinary problems. He made three cup appearances for the Manchester United first-team before joining West Ham United in January 2012. Morrison spent the 2012–13 season on loan with Birmingham City, and also played for Queens Park Rangers and Cardiff City on loan in 2014, featuring in the QPR side that won the 2014 Football League Championship play-off final.

In July 2015, on the termination of his West Ham United contract, he joined Lazio. In 2017, he had a loan spell back at QPR, before spending the 2017–18 season on loan at Mexican club Atlas. He joined Swedish club Östersund in February 2019, before returning to England to join Sheffield United in July 2019. In 2020, he had a loan spell at Middlesbrough, before leaving Sheffield United on the expiry of his contract.

Born in England, he represented that country at under-16, under-17, under-18 and under-21 levels. He qualifies by descent to represent Jamaica, and made his senior international debut for that country in November 2020.

== Club career ==
=== Manchester United ===
Morrison's first club was Fletcher Moss Rangers. He was first scouted for the Manchester United Academy by former United coach Phil Brogan. According to Rio Ferdinand, United manager Sir Alex Ferguson "thought he was the best player he had seen at that age". Morrison signed on as a first-year scholar in 2009 and turned professional on 2 February 2010, on his 17th birthday.

He made his first team debut in a 3–2 League Cup win over Wolverhampton Wanderers on 26 October 2010, coming on as a substitute for Park Ji-Sung. After his debut, Alex Ferguson later revealed Morrison visited his office the following morning. "Another thing about Ravel, which I've always treasured because no other young player who made their debut did it, was after the first game in the first team that he played, the next morning he came to my office and gave me a letter thanking me for giving him his debut. I was gobsmacked, The boy had a good heart."

On 20 April 2011 he scored the opening goal against Chelsea in the semi-final of the FA Youth Cup at Old Trafford, which Manchester United went on to win 4–0. Morrison added two more goals in the second leg of the Youth Cup final against Sheffield United, a match that Manchester United went on to win 4–1, securing the title 6–3 on aggregate. On 25 October 2011, he came on as a substitute for Mame Biram Diouf in a 3–0 League Cup win over Aldershot Town. He then came on at half-time during United's 2–1 League Cup fifth round loss to Crystal Palace, replacing Dimitar Berbatov. On 13 January 2012, Manchester United confirmed that they rejected an offer from Newcastle United, despite Morrison's contract being due to expire in June 2012.

=== West Ham United ===
On 31 January 2012, Morrison signed for Championship club West Ham United on a three-and-a-half-year contract for an undisclosed fee. A clause in the contract between Manchester United and West Ham United ensured that the Manchester club would receive £25,000 for every game Morrison played for West Ham United. Allowing him to leave Manchester United, manager Sir Alex Ferguson told West Ham United manager, Sam Allardyce of Morrison, "A brilliant footballer. Brilliant ability. Top class ability. Needs to get away from Manchester and start a new life". On 17 March 2012, he made his debut for The Hammers, replacing Jack Collison in the 81st minute of the 1–1 draw at Leeds United.

==== Birmingham City (loan) ====
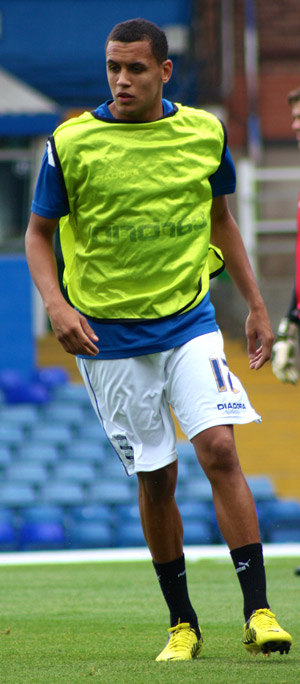
Morrison in pre-season for Birmingham City in 2012

With West Ham manager Sam Allardyce keen for him to gain experience of first-team football, Morrison joined Championship club Birmingham City on loan for the 2012–13 season. He made his competitive debut for the club on 14 August 2012, playing 78 minutes in a 5–1 win over Barnet in the League Cup, and kept his place for the opening match of the league season, a 1–1 draw at home to Charlton Athletic. Problems with Morrison's attitude in training had led manager Lee Clark to consider terminating his loan, but he returned to the team in October with an influential performance as Birmingham City narrowly failed to beat league leaders Leicester City. The improvement continued as Birmingham City came back from 3–0 down to draw at Millwall; as the Birmingham Mail's reporter noted, "it wasn't just his elegant, effortless ability on the ball and passing, but work rate, too". He scored his first goal in league football on 17 November 2012, a "spectacular volley" from Nikola Žigić's knockdown, to start Birmingham City's attempted comeback from 3–0 at home to Hull City.

==== Return to West Ham United ====
Morrison returned to West Ham United from his loan with Birmingham City for the 2013–14 season. He was given the squad number 15 with only his first name, "Ravel", listed on the back of his shirt. Morrison scored his first goal for West Ham United on his full debut, in the second round of the League Cup, on 27 August 2013, in a 2–1 win against Cheltenham Town. Starting the game against Everton on 21 September 2013, Morrison scored his first Premier League goal, and West Ham United's first of the game, in a 3–2 home defeat. On 6 October 2013, he scored West Ham's third goal in a 3–0 derby win away against Tottenham Hotspur at White Hart Lane. Manager Sam Allardyce said of the goal, "That's a genius goal for me. You'll struggle to see a better goal than that all season". It went on to win the West Ham "Goal of the Season" award.

==== Queens Park Rangers (loan) ====
On 19 February 2014, Morrison's 93-day loan, to commence on 21 February, to Championship side Queens Park Rangers was announced. Morrison's first goals for Queens Park Rangers came on 8 March 2014. Playing against Birmingham City he scored both goals in a 2–0 win; the first from a free-kick after Paul Robinson had fouled Kevin Doyle and the second from a cross by Jermaine Jenas. Morrison was a member of the Queens Park Rangers side which won the 2014 Football League Championship play-off final, 1–0 against Derby County at Wembley on 24 May 2014 when he was an unused substitute.

In the 2013–2014 season Morrison scored 13 goals in 33 starts for clubs and country in all competitions. West Ham United manager Sam Allardyce said of Morrison in September 2014, "It's not that he has to impress me as a footballer, we know about his talent. It's about playing the talent and himself to a disciplined life in general, is what needs to happen with Rav. If that happens we'd want him here."

==== Cardiff City (loan) ====
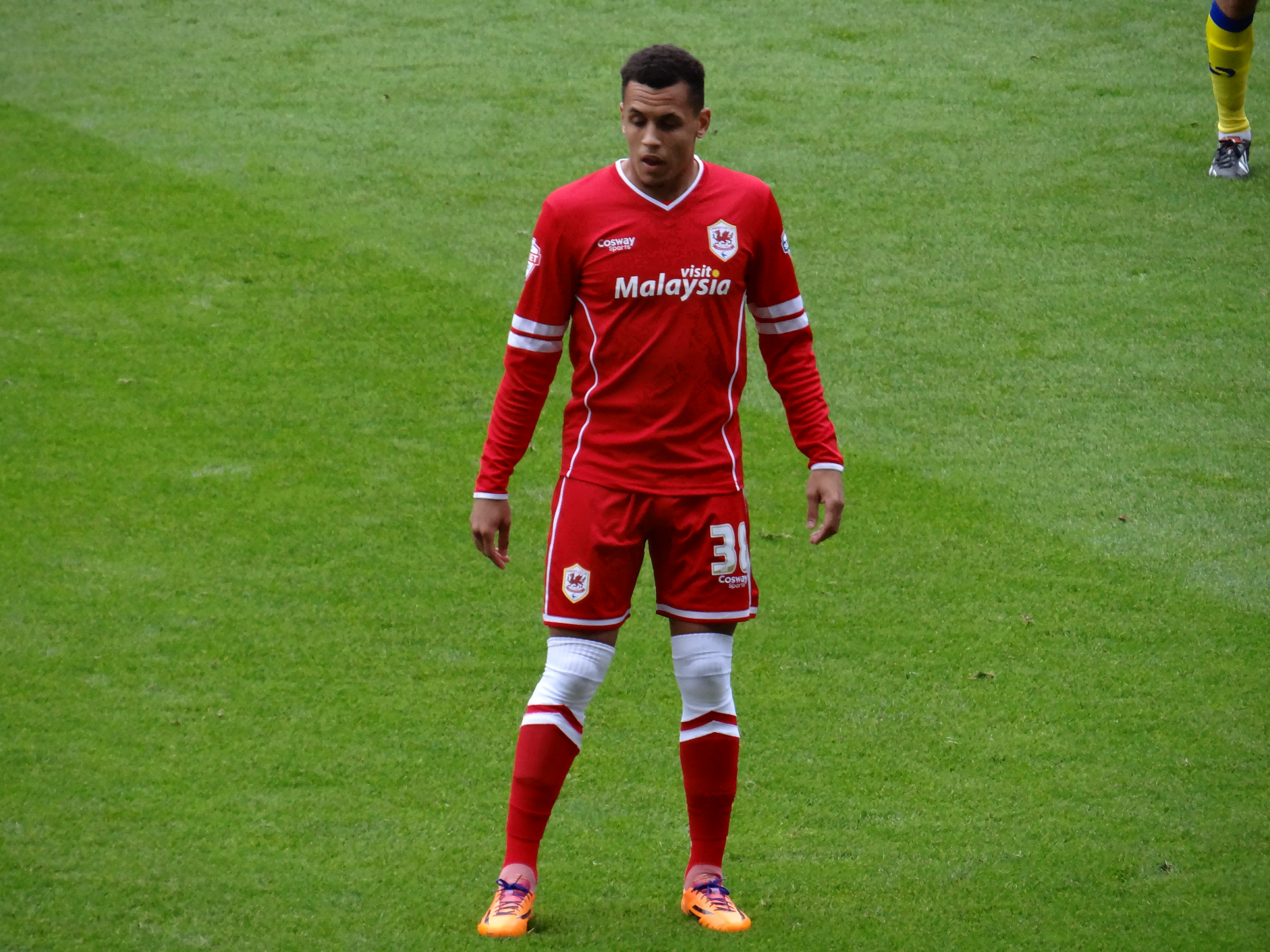
Morrison in action for Cardiff City in September 2014

On 23 September 2014, Morrison completed a three-month loan move, until 26 December 2014, to Championship side Cardiff City.

He was named Man of the Match by WalesOnline on his first and only start for the club, against Blackpool, on 14 October 2014. While still on loan with Cardiff City, West Ham United placed Morrison on the transfer list making him available for transfer for a "nominal fee" in the January 2015 transfer window. In December 2014, Morrison returned early to West Ham United from his loan, after Cardiff City manager Russell Slade said Morrison had no future at the club. He had played seven games, one start and six as a substitute, without scoring.

=== Lazio ===
In January 2015, it was reported that Morrison had signed a pre-contract agreement to join Lazio on a four-year deal at the end of the 2014–15 season. In February 2015, Morrison's contract with West Ham United was terminated early and the player began training with Lazio ahead of his proposed move. By June, various reports in the English media suggested that Morrison had become unsettled in Rome and in turn had instructed his representatives to seek out a move back home. Soon after, it emerged that former club Queens Park Rangers were the lead club to secure Morrison's signature, with the player reportedly keen to return to London, however Morrison himself later denied these claims.

Morrison made his Lazio debut in a 14–0 victory against C.S. Auronzo on 12 July 2015, scoring two goals and providing two assists, with his overall performance "sending the fans into ecstasy". He made his competitive debut for Lazio in the UEFA Champions League play-off round second leg match, away to Bayer Leverkusen on 26 August 2015. Morrison played the final eight minutes in place of Ogenyi Onazi in a 3–0 loss (3–1 on aggregate). Four days later, he made his Serie A debut in a 4–0 loss to Chievo, coming on at half time in place of Senad Lulić.

Morrison scarcely featured in Lazio's start to the 2015–16 season, with coach Stefano Pioli criticising his effort and inability to speak Italian. In October 2015, he posted a message on Twitter saying solely "January..", leading to more reports of an exit from the club.

==== Queens Park Rangers and Atlas loans ====
On 31 January 2017, Morrison returned to Queens Park Rangers on loan until the end of the 2016–17 season. He made five appearances for them in the Championship, all but one as a substitute, and the West London club did not take the option to sign him for £2 million.

On 31 August 2017, Morrison joined Atlas on loan until the end of the 2017–18 season. Only one other Englishman had previously played in Liga MX, Chester-born Antonio Pedroza, who was raised in Mexico and whose father is Mexican.

=== Östersund ===
In February 2019, having returned to Lazio in the previous July, Morrison trained with Allsvenskan side Östersund at their pre-season camp in Marbella. On 14 February, it was confirmed that he had signed a six-month contract with the club. He scored his first goal for the club on 3 March 2019, in a Svenska Cupen match against IK Sirius, the first goal of a 3–0 win. In June 2019, Morrison's contract was not renewed due to frequent injury and his salary, despite the manager's praise of him.

=== Sheffield United, and Middlesbrough loan ===
In July 2019, manager Chris Wilder confirmed that Morrison had begun training with newly promoted Premier League side Sheffield United ahead of the new season, describing the move as being "a good fit for the player and the club". On 16 July, it was confirmed that Morrison had signed a one-year deal.

On 31 January 2020, Morrison signed for Middlesbrough on loan for the remainder of the 2019–20 season. With one game of the season remaining, it was announced that Morrison had been released by the club, and would return to parent club Sheffield United. Morrison was released by Sheffield United upon the expiry of his contract at the end of the 2019–20 season.

=== ADO Den Haag ===
On 21 September 2020, Dutch club ADO Den Haag announced that they had signed Morrison on a contract until the end of the 2020–21 season. His contract was terminated by mutual consent on 9 January 2021.

=== Derby County ===
After playing in several trial games in pre-season during the summer of 2021, Morrison signed for Derby County on a one-year contract on 7 August 2021. On his debut for Derby he scored in an EFL Cup tie against Salford City on 10 August 2021. He left the club at the end of the 2021–22 season, the end of his contract.

=== D.C. United ===
In July 2022, Morrison signed for Major League Soccer club D.C. United on a 1 1/2-year deal, with an optional additional year. He made his debut for D.C. on 31 July against Orlando City. Morrison scored his first goal on 28 August against Atlanta United, netting the opening goal for D.C. United in an eventual 3–2 loss. Morrison was left out of D.C. United's MLS squad for the 2023 season, resulting in him being unable to play in the competition while still being allowed to train with his teammates.

=== Precision ===
On 30 September 2024, Morrison joined UAE Second Division League club Precision.

=== Arabian Falcons ===
In October 2025, Morrison joined fellow UAE Second Division League club Arabian Falcons.

== International career ==
Morrison was capped by England at under 16, under 17, under 18 and under 21 levels. Morrison is also eligible to play for Jamaica and, in November 2012, he was reported to be considering representing them at international level. He made his England under-21 debut on 10 October 2013, in a 4–0 away win against San Marino. He scored his first goals for the under-21 team in a 5–0 UEFA Euro 2015 qualifying win over Lithuania.

In March 2018, he was invited to a training camp with Jamaica to discuss switching his national allegiance with Jamaican officials. In May 2019, Morrison was named as one of the 40 players in Theodore Whitmore's preliminary Jamaica squad for the 2019 CONCACAF Gold Cup. In October 2020, Morrison was named as one of the 23 players in Whitmore's final Jamaica squad for friendlies against Saudi Arabia. He made his debut for Jamaica in a 3–0 friendly loss to Saudi Arabia on 14 November 2020.

Morrison scored his first goal for Jamaica against Honduras in their final game of 2022 FIFA World Cup qualification on 30 March 2022.

== Style of play ==
Throughout his career, a number of people within the game have come forward to laud Morrison's ability. Lazio director Igli Tare said in October 2015 that Morrison "has undoubted quality and is world class, as well as being a little mad". Sir Alex Ferguson stated "My first and lasting memory of Ravel as a young lad was that he [always] got time and space. He's always available to be on the ball, so unusual for a young lad of his age." FourFourTwo writer Alasdair Mackenzie predicted that with a more humble approach, Morrison could become a favourite of the Lazio fans, who had previously revered other eccentric players such as Paul Gascoigne and Paolo Di Canio.

Morrison's former Manchester United teammate Rio Ferdinand named Morrison as the most talented young player that he had seen, his manager at West Ham, Sam Allardyce, said in 2017 that he considered Morrison to be "the biggest waste of talent" he had worked with. Writing for The Guardian in 2011, journalist Daniel Taylor described him as a player with "balance, speed, control, vision, flair, strong on either foot, an eye for a pass and a prolific scorer".

In a 2020 interview with The Times, Wayne Rooney stated "I remember watching Ravel Morrison thinking he had everything required for a player in his position. He was brilliant. He was confident. He nutmegged Nemanja Vidic three times in the space of a minute in one training game. But he struggled with lifestyle and his environment which was sad for him — because I saw Paul Pogba come through, Jesse Lingard, all these players and Ravel was better than any of them by a country mile."

Pogba himself later confirmed “Let me tell you: Ravel is the best player of my generation that I have seen, no doubt. I saw stuff Neymar was doing at Santos — Ravel was doing that. In a way I feel sorry, but at the same time players have this responsibility — and he knows it. He realises that if he had to make it again, he wouldn’t make the same choices he’s made in the past years.”

== Personal life ==
Morrison was born in Wythenshawe, Manchester, and lived with his grandparents in Denton, Greater Manchester, before his transfer to West Ham United. During Morrison's trial for witness intimidation in 2011, it was revealed that he has been diagnosed with ADHD. His club at the time, Manchester United, applied for a Therapeutic Use Exemption to allow Morrison to take his prescribed medication for the disorder, but their request was declined. To avoid a potential ban for violation of doping rules, and under instruction from Manchester United, Morrison did not take his prescribed medication for the disorder.

=== Legal history ===
In early 2011, Morrison received a 12-month referral order and was ordered to pay £1,445 in costs and compensation after admitting two counts of witness intimidation. After an assault charge was dropped when Morrison's girlfriend refused to testify, he was convicted of criminal damage for throwing her mobile phone out of a window and advised to undergo domestic violence counselling. In February 2012, Morrison was involved in controversy after posting a homophobic threat on Twitter, responding to criticism by calling another user a "faggot". He was charged under FA rule E3, which governs use of abusive and/or insulting words including reference to a person's sexual orientation, and accepted his guilt. He was fined £7,000.

Morrison was remanded in custody on 31 July 2014 after being charged with two counts of common assault against a former girlfriend and her mother. He was freed on bail after three days in custody. In August 2014 he appeared at Manchester Crown Court entering not-guilty pleas to two counts of assault, one of assault causing actual bodily harm and one count of harassment. A provisional trial date was set for 26 January 2015. In November 2014 he was found not guilty of the harassment charge of threatening to throw acid in the face of his ex-girlfriend and have her killed after the Crown Prosecution Service withdrew the charge. On 15 January 2015, Morrison was cleared of all charges of assaulting his ex-girlfriend and her mother.

On 30 November 2023, Morrison pleaded guilty to one count of fraud after he purchased a disabled parking permit and used it to park in Manchester city centre. The permit's owner had died in February 2022, and Morrison reportedly bought it for £50 from "someone in Old Trafford." Morrison was ordered to pay a £1,000 fine, £508 in costs and a £400 victim surcharge.

== Career statistics ==
=== Club ===
As of match played November 16, 2026

Appearances and goals by club, season and competition
Club	Season	League			National cup		League cup		Continental		Other		Total	
Club	Season	Division	Apps	Goals	Apps	Goals	Apps	Goals	Apps	Goals	Apps	Goals	Apps	Goals
Manchester United	2010–11	Premier League	0	0	0	0	1	0	0	0	0	0	1	0
Manchester United	2011–12	Premier League	0	0	0	0	2	0	0	0	0	0	2	0
Manchester United	Total		0	0	0	0	3	0	0	0	0	0	3	0
West Ham United	2011–12	Championship	1	0	0	0	0	0	—		0	0	1	0
West Ham United	2013–14	Premier League	16	3	1	0	4	2	—		—		21	5
West Ham United	2014–15	Premier League	1	0	0	0	1	0	—		—		2	0
West Ham United	Total		18	3	1	0	5	2	—		0	0	24	5
Birmingham City (loan)	2012–13	Championship	27	3	2	0	1	0	—		—		30	3
Queens Park Rangers (loan)	2013–14	Championship	15	6	0	0	0	0	—		2 (Note: Appearances in EFL Championship play-offs)	0	17	6
Cardiff City (loan)	2014–15	Championship	7	0	0	0	0	0	—		—		7	0
Lazio	2015–16	Serie A	4	0	0	0	—		3 (Note: One appearance in UEFA Champions League, two appearances in UEFA Europa League)	0	1 (Note: Appearance in Supercoppa Italiana)	0	8	0
Queens Park Rangers (loan)	2016–17	Championship	5	0	0	0	0	0	—		—		5	0
Atlas (loan)	2017–18	Liga MX	18	3	5	1	—		—		2 (Note: Appearances in Liga MX playoffs (liguilla))	0	25	4
Östersund	2019	Allsvenskan	6	0	3	1	—		—		—		9	1
Sheffield United	2019–20	Premier League	1	0	1	0	2	0	—		—		4	0
Middlesbrough (loan)	2019–20	Championship	3	0	0	0	0	0	—		—		3	0
ADO Den Haag	2020–21	Eredivisie	4	0	1	0	—		—		—		5	0
Derby County	2021–22	Championship	36	4	1	0	1	1	—		—		38	5
D.C. United	2022	Major League Soccer	14	2	0	0	—		—		—		14	2
D.C. United	2023	Major League Soccer	0	0	0	0	—		—		—		0	0
Precision	2024–25	UAE Second Division League	20	9	0	0	—		—		—		20	9
Arabian Falcons	2025–26	UAE Second Division League	22	3	1	0	—		—		—		23	3
Arabian Falcons	2026–27	UAE Second Division League	9	0	0	0	—		—		—		9	0
Career total			208	33	15	2	12	3	3	0	5	0	243	38

=== International ===
As of match played 10 June 2025

Appearances and goals by national team and year
National team	Year	Apps	Goals
Jamaica	2020	2	0
Jamaica	2021	4	0
Jamaica	2022	9	2
Jamaica	2023	3	0
Jamaica	2024	0	0
Jamaica	2025	3	0
Total		21	2

Scores and results list Jamaica's goal tally first, score column indicates score after each Morrison goal.

List of international goals scored by Ravel Morrison
No.	Date	Venue	Opponent	Score	Result	Competition
1	30 March 2022	Independence Park, Kingston, Jamaica	Honduras	2–1	2–1	2022 FIFA World Cup qualification
2	7 June 2022	Independence Park, Kingston, Jamaica	Suriname	1–0	3–1	2022–23 CONCACAF Nations League A

== Honours ==
Manchester United U18

- FA Youth Cup: 2010–11

Queens Park Rangers

- Football League Championship play-offs: 2014

Individual

- Football League Championship Player of the Month: March 2014
