= Carlton Cole =

English footballer (born 1983)

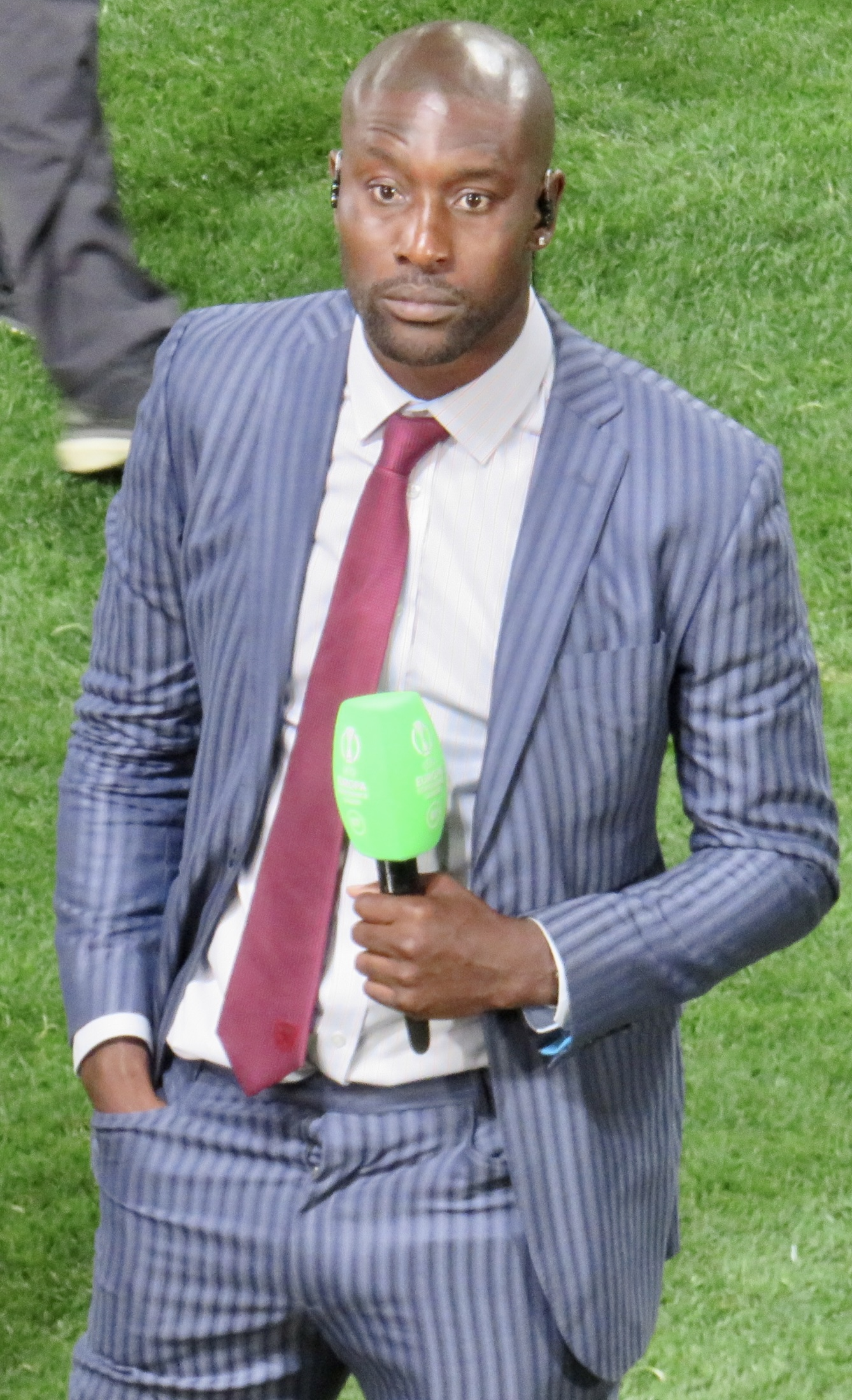
- Cole commentating for TV in 2023

Personal information
- Full name: Carlton Michael George Cole
- Date of birth: 12 October 1983 (age 43)
- Place of birth: Croydon, London, England
- Height: 6 ft 3 in (1.91 m)
- Position: Striker

Youth career
- –2001: Chelsea

Senior career*
Years	Team	Apps	(Gls)
2001–2006	Chelsea	25	(4)
2002–2003	→ Wolverhampton Wanderers (loan)	7	(1)
2003–2004	→ Charlton Athletic (loan)	21	(4)
2004–2005	→ Aston Villa (loan)	27	(3)
2006–2013	West Ham United	207	(47)
2013–2015	West Ham United	49	(8)
2015–2016	Celtic	4	(0)
2016	Sacramento Republic	4	(0)
2017	Persib Bandung	5	(0)
Total		349	(67)

International career
2002	England U19	5	(1)
2002–2003	England U20	2	(0)
2003–2005	England U21	19	(6)
2009–2010	England	7	(0)
- * Club domestic league appearances and goals

Carlton Michael George Cole (born 12 October 1983) is an English football coach and former professional footballer who played as a striker. He scored 52 goals in 288 Premier League appearances for four clubs.

Cole began his career at Chelsea in 2001, spending spells out on loan at Wolverhampton Wanderers, Charlton Athletic and Aston Villa before being transferred to West Ham United in 2006. He was released by West Ham in 2013 only to be re-signed several months later, and the club released him for a second time in May 2015. He later had brief spells at Celtic in Scotland, Sacramento Republic in the United States and Persib Bandung in Indonesia.

He made 19 England under-21 appearances (scoring six goals), and made his debut for the England national team on 11 February 2009 in a friendly match against Spain.

== Club career ==
=== Chelsea ===
==== 2001–02 season ====
Cole was born in Croydon, London, to a Nigerian father and Sierra Leonean mother. He began his career as a trainee with Chelsea, before signing his first professional contract with the club in October 2000.

He made his first-team debut on 6 April 2002 as a substitute for Jimmy Floyd Hasselbaink in a 3–0 home victory against Everton. He made his first senior start three weeks later, scoring a goal as Chelsea beat Middlesbrough at the Riverside Stadium. He made one more appearance for Chelsea in the 2001–02 season, in a 3–1 home defeat against Aston Villa in May.

==== 2002–03 season ====
Cole started the 2002–03 season in the Chelsea first-team squad, scoring a goal and making another in the opening match of the season in a 3–2 win over Charlton Athletic after coming on as a substitute for Gianfranco Zola. He suffered a hairline fracture in his leg in August but returned to action in a League Cup tie against Gillingham on 6 November, scoring both Chelsea goals in a 2–1 home win in the third round. Chelsea manager Claudio Ranieri described Cole as being the best young player that he had ever coached, saying, "I've never coached a young player like Carlton. He's fantastic even though he hasn't really started his career yet. He has a very long contract, and, in my opinion, a very big future at Chelsea". However, with Eiður Guðjohnsen, Hasselbaink and Zola available for selection, Cole's first team opportunities were limited and he was loaned to Wolverhampton Wanderers in November for one month, later extended to two months.

Cole made seven appearances for Wolves, scoring one goal to win the home game against Norwich City on 7 December. His loan spell was cut short as Chelsea, needing cover, recalled him early in January 2003. He made a further 12 league and cup appearances for Chelsea in the season, in addition to the four that he made before going on loan to Wolves. He scored six goals in all for Chelsea that season, including a long-range left-footed strike against Sunderland, and the winner against Bolton Wanderers in April 2003 as Chelsea pressed for a place in the UEFA Champions League.

==== 2003–04 season ====
Cole signed a new six-year contract with Chelsea in July 2003. After the club's purchase by billionaire Roman Abramovich led to the signings of international strikers Adrian Mutu and Hernán Crespo, Cole went to Charlton Athletic on a season-long loan in August. He scored five goals in 22 league and cup appearances, helping Charlton to finish the 2003–04 season in seventh place in the Premier League.

==== 2004–05 season ====
Despite Charlton being keen to retain Cole's services for the 2004–05 season, he joined Aston Villa on a season-long loan in July 2004. This move sparked off a dispute, as Charlton were expecting Cole to return to the club as part of the deal that took Scott Parker from Charlton to Chelsea. The dispute was later resolved when the two clubs reached a settlement.

Cole scored three goals in 30 league and cup appearances for Villa, including a goal on his debut in a 2–0 win over Southampton on 14 August, in a season which was interrupted by a knee injury picked up in an England under-21 match against the Netherlands in February 2005.

==== 2005–06 season ====
He returned to Chelsea in the summer of 2005 where he appeared in pre-season friendlies. However, first team opportunities were limited by the presence of Didier Drogba and Hernán Crespo, and Cole made only 12 league and cup appearances for Chelsea in the 2005–06 season, scoring one goal in an FA Cup win over Huddersfield Town.

He joined West Ham United in July 2006, having made a total of 31 league and cup appearances for Chelsea, scoring eight goals.

=== West Ham United ===
==== 2006–09 ====
Cole joined West Ham United in July 2006 for an undisclosed fee, signing a four-year contract. He scored seconds into his competitive debut for West Ham after coming on as a substitute in injury time to seal a 3–1 home win against Charlton on 19 August. However, in a season of turmoil at West Ham. in which the club only secured their place in the Premier League on the final day of the season, Cole was unable to establish himself in the first team, making 23 league and cup appearances, 15 of which were as substitute, and scoring three goals.

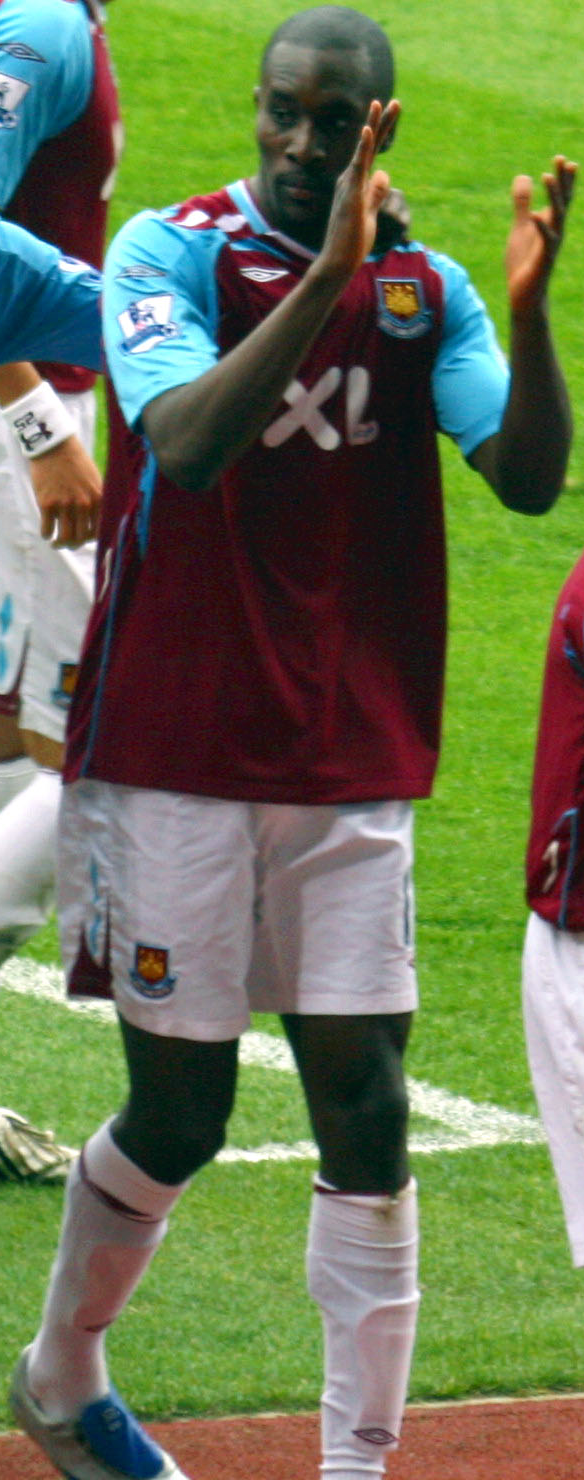
Cole playing for West Ham United in 2008

In the 2008–09 season, Cole scored twelve goals in all competitions, as well as picking up a further four assists. He started the season in good form, scoring four goals in his first eight matches. On 26 October 2008, Cole received his first red card of his West Ham career against Arsenal, with a foul on Alex Song at Upton Park. Cole's form earned him a new five-year contract, which he signed in November.

==== 2009–11 ====
He continued the good form in 2009–10 season, made 30 Premier League appearances, starting 26 of them. He scored ten Premier League goals, including one penalty in the 5–3 home win over Burnley on 28 November. He was then linked with a £20 million January 2010 transfer to Manchester United. After netting six goals in his first ten Premier League matches, he missed the period between 28 November and 26 February with a knee injury. He also made two League Cup appearances, starting the home second-round win over Millwall. He was booked four times over the course of the season.

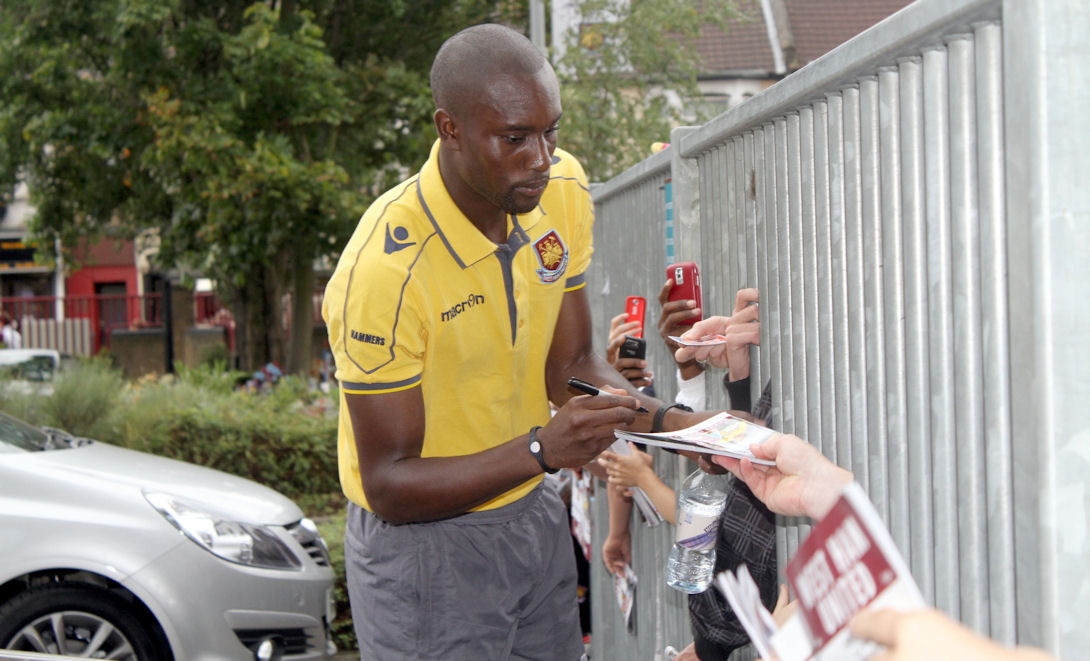
Cole signing autographs in 2010

He was linked with a transfer to Liverpool in August 2010 for a fee reported to be £20m which consisted of £15m including £5m in performance related add-ons. On 26 December, he scored two goals in a Premier League match for the first time in his career, in a 3–1 away win against Fulham at Craven Cottage. He also got a brace in the 4–0 League Cup quarter-final victory over Manchester United on 30 November. On 12 February 2011, Cole scored in a 3–3 draw against West Bromwich Albion at The Hawthorns On 27 February, Cole scored the final goal in West Ham's 3–1 victory against Liverpool within two minutes of coming on as a substitute at Upton Park.

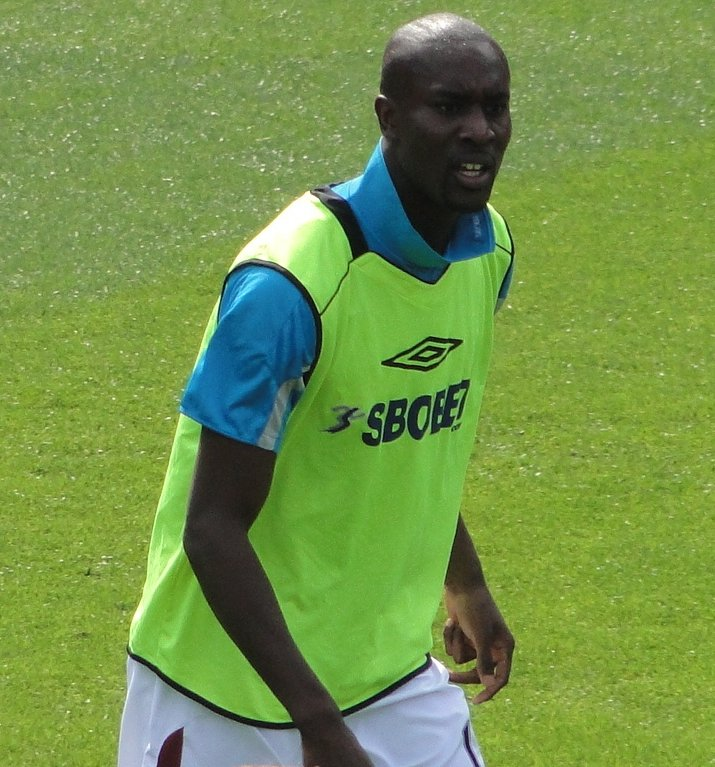
Cole playing for West Ham United in 2010

==== 2011–13 ====
After failed bids from both Turkish club Galatasaray and Premier League club Stoke City, West Ham confirmed that Cole was committed to the club and would be staying. After coming on as a substitute for Frédéric Piquionne in the two opening matches of the Championship season without scoring, he started the next four matches, scoring four goals, including the winning goal in a 4–3 win against Portsmouth on 10 September. On 19 November, Cole scored West Ham's 2000th away league goal in a 2–1 away win against Coventry City. He scored his 50th goal for West Ham in the 1–1 draw with Birmingham City on 26 December. On 19 May 2012, Cole scored the first goal, his 15th of the season, in West Ham's 2–1 win over Blackpool in the play-off final, ensuring an immediate return to the Premier League. Cole played 43 games in all competitions, scoring 15 goals, with 14 coming in league games. He ended the season as West Ham's top goal scorer.

Cole's first goal of the 2012–13 season came in a 3–1 victory against London rivals Chelsea on 1 December 2012, with a header inside the six-yard box to the near post. Cole scored again on 23 December, putting West Ham in the lead in the 14th minute against Everton. In the same match, he was sent off for a dangerous tackle against Leighton Baines. West Ham appealed against the red card and it was overturned by The Football Association on 27 December. For the remainder of the season he was mostly used as a substitute or kept out of the team by Andy Carroll. On 21 May 2013, West Ham announced that Cole would be leaving the club at the end of the season. He had been at the club for seven seasons.

==== 2013–15 ====
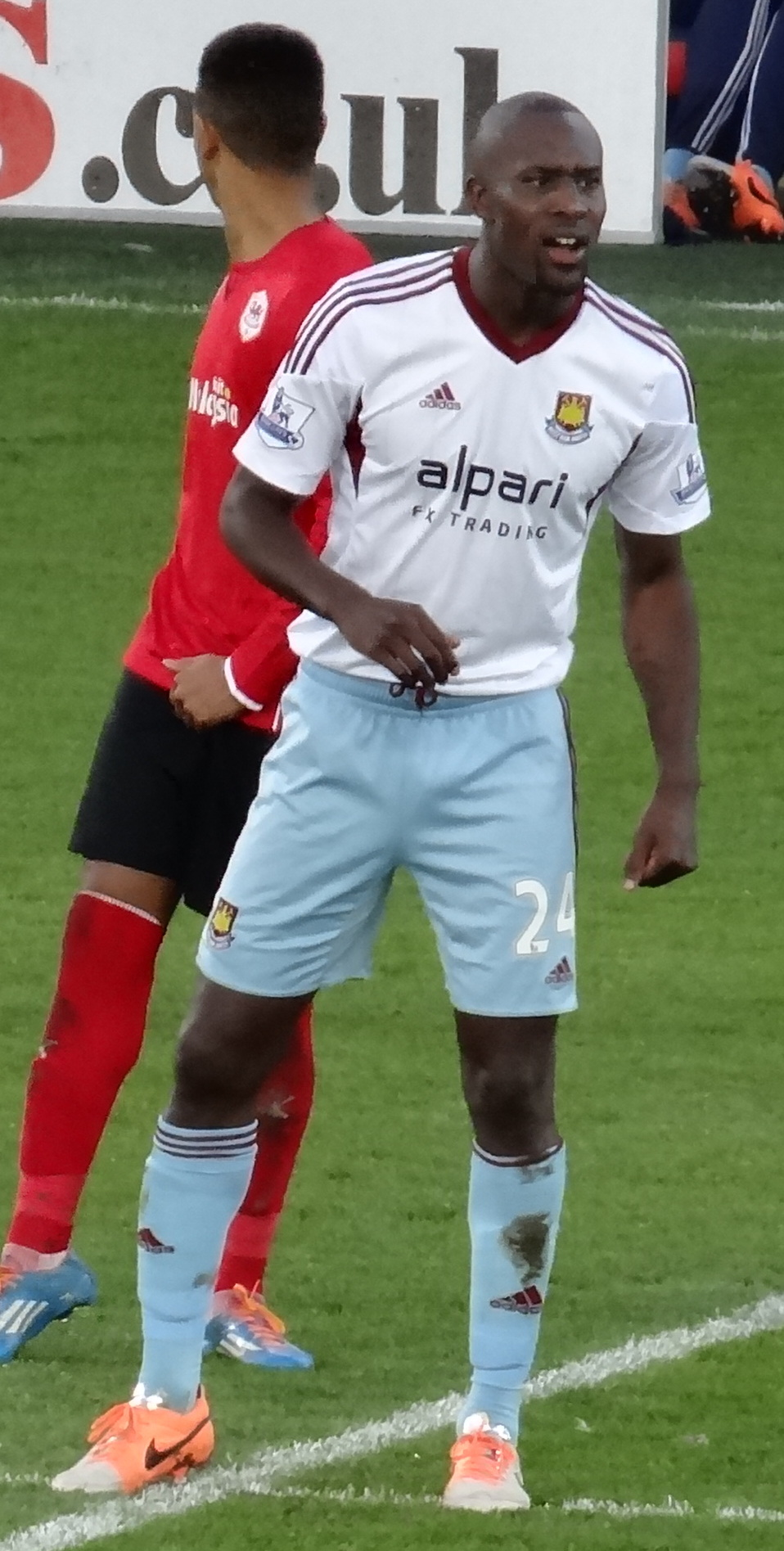
Cole playing for West Ham United in 2014

On 3 September 2013, after West Ham failed with a number of bids for strikers at the end of the transfer window, they approached Cole about returning to the club. The move did not take place however, due to concerns over Cole's fitness. After training at the club to regain his fitness, on 14 October, Cole signed a short-term contract with West Ham, keeping him at the club until January 2014. Cole made 6 starts and 8 appearances as a substitute for West Ham during this short-term contract. His first goal in his second spell came on 30 November in his fourth match: coming on as an 81st-minute substitute for Modibo Maïga, Cole scored the second West Ham goal, barely a minute later, and another in the 88th minute, in a 3–0 win against Fulham. He went on to score four more goals, against Manchester United, Arsenal, Cardiff City and Newcastle United. On 15 January 2014, Cole signed an 18-month contract keeping him at the club to the end of the 2014–15 season.

Cole started West Ham's first match of the 2014–15 season, against Tottenham Hotspur. His first goal came in the following match, on 23 August, in a 3–1 away win against Crystal Palace. His only other goals of the season came in a 3–1 away win at Burnley on 10 October and in a 2–2 home FA Cup draw against Everton on 13 January 2015, equalising in the 113th minute to make the match 2–2. West Ham won the match 9–8 on penalties with Cole taking and scoring one for West Ham. In January, Cole was set to join West Bromwich Albion. The deal fell through after West Ham refused to sanction the move after attempts to sign Tottenham striker Emmanuel Adebayor as a replacement striker were blocked by Tottenham chairman Daniel Levy. Cole made 23 league appearances in the season, 15 after coming on as a substitute. He was released by West Ham at the end of the 2014–15 season. Following his release, after nine years with West Ham, Cole stated his intention to seek at least three more seasons playing at the top-level of football.

=== Later career ===
On 22 October 2015, Cole signed for Scottish champions Celtic on a two-year deal lasting until 2017. He said of the move "When Celtic called and said they wanted me, I just ran over. Being at Celtic is not about the money, it's about wearing the shirt with pride. Celtic are in a great position to win trophies and I want to add that to my career". He made his debut for Celtic on 29 November in a 1–3 victory away to Inverness Caledonian Thistle; coming on as a 61st-minute substitute for Tom Rogic, Cole provided the assist for Celtic's third goal, an own goal by Danny Devine. On 10 January 2016, he scored his only goal for Celtic in a 3–0 win over Stranraer at Stair Park, in the fourth round of the Scottish Cup. On 16 June, Celtic confirmed that Cole had been released by the club after just eight months.

On 9 August 2016, Cole signed for United Soccer League club Sacramento Republic. After four appearances, he left the club to return to the United Kingdom. On 30 March 2017, Cole signed for Indonesian club Persib Bandung in the Liga 1. Signing a ten-month contract, he was reunited with former Chelsea teammate Michael Essien. Cole only played twice as a starter from his five appearances without scoring a goal. On 4 August, Persib officially terminated his contract. Cole was handed a trial by AFC Wimbledon in the beginning of January 2018 and immediately played for their development squad, where he scored a goal in his first game. According to the club's manager, Neal Ardley "Carlton's agent spoke to Simon Bassey [first-team coach] and asked about him coming in. This was back in November and we said yeah". However, he was never handed a contract and despite interest from Hull City and Birmingham City, Cole announced his official retirement on 29 March 2018.

== International career ==
Cole represented England at youth levels, making five under-19 appearances, two under-20 appearances and 19 under-21 appearances (scoring six goals).

He made his debut for the England national team on 11 February 2009 in a friendly match against Spain. Coming on as a 75th-minute substitute, he saw a late effort cleared off the line by Carlos Marchena, after latching onto a David Beckham pass. He made seven appearances for England, all from the substitutes' bench, which is, as of June 2021, a national record.

== Coaching career ==
In December 2018, Cole rejoined West Ham United to work with the club's academy players, providing support to under-18 coaches Jack Collison and Mark Phillips.

== Controversies ==
In April 2011, Cole was fined £20,000 by The Football Association for comments he made on Twitter regarding England's friendly against Ghana, at Wembley Stadium the previous month, joking that the match was being used as a sting operation by immigration authorities. He requested that the fine be donated to a Ghanaian charity of his choice.

Cole was again charged by The Football Association in March 2015, when in response to a Tottenham fan taunting him on Twitter by asking whether he would consider retirement, he replied "Fuck off you cunt". After admitting the offence, he was fined £20,000.

On 28 November 2021, Cole and BBC Radio 5 Live apologised when he compared a possible overwhelming attack by Manchester City Football Club as a holocaust for their opponents. The incident happened on the first day of Hanukkah, a Jewish holiday.

== Career statistics ==
=== Club ===
Appearances and goals by club, season and competition
Club	Season	League			National cup (Note: Includes FA Cup, Scottish Cup)		League cup (Note: Includes Football League Cup)		Other		Total	
Club	Season	Division	Apps	Goals	Apps	Goals	Apps	Goals	Apps	Goals	Apps	Goals
Chelsea	2001–02	Premier League	3	1	0	0	0	0	0	0	3	1
Chelsea	2002–03	Premier League	13	3	2	1	1	2	0	0	16	6
Chelsea	2003–04	Premier League	0	0	—		—		0	0	0	0
Chelsea	2005–06	Premier League	9	0	2	1	0	0	1 (Note: Appearance in UEFA Champions League)	0	12	1
Chelsea	Total		25	4	4	2	1	2	1	0	31	8
Wolverhampton Wanderers (loan)	2002–03	First Division	7	1	—		—		—		7	1
Charlton Athletic (loan)	2003–04	Premier League	21	4	1	1	—		—		22	5
Aston Villa (loan)	2004–05	Premier League	27	3	1	0	2	0	—		30	3
West Ham United	2006–07	Premier League	17	2	2	1	0	0	2 (Note: Appearances in UEFA Cup)	0	21	3
West Ham United	2007–08	Premier League	31	4	2	0	4	2	—		37	6
West Ham United	2008–09	Premier League	27	10	4	1	1	1	—		32	12
West Ham United	2009–10	Premier League	30	10	0	0	2	0	—		32	10
West Ham United	2010–11	Premier League	35	5	2	2	6	4	—		43	11
West Ham United	2011–12	Championship	40	14	0	0	0	0	3 (Note: Appearances in Championship play-offs)	1	43	15
West Ham United	2012–13	Premier League	27	2	2	0	0	0	—		29	2
West Ham United	2013–14	Premier League	26	6	0	0	4	0	—		30	6
West Ham United	2014–15	Premier League	23	2	3	1	0	0	—		26	3
West Ham United	Total		256	55	15	5	17	7	5	1	293	68
Celtic	2015–16	Scottish Premiership	4	0	1	1	0	0	0	0	5	1
Sacramento Republic	2016	United Soccer League	3	0	—		—		1 (Note: Appearance in USL Playoffs)	0	4	0
Persib Bandung	2017	Liga 1	5	0	—		—		—		5	0
Career total			348	67	22	9	20	9	7	1	397	86

=== International ===
Appearances and goals by national team and year
National team	Year	Apps	Goals
England	2009	6	0
England	2010	1	0
Total		7	0

== Honours ==
West Ham United

- Football League Championship play-offs: 2012
