= 2008–09 West Ham United F.C. season =

English football team season

West Ham United F.C.
2008–09 season
- Chairman: Björgólfur Guðmundsson
- Manager: Alan Curbishley (until 3 September); Gianfranco Zola (from 9 September)
- Premier League: 9th
- FA Cup: Fifth round
- League Cup: Third round
- Top goalscorer: Carlton Cole 10
- Highest home attendance: 34,802 (v Arsenal)
- Lowest home attendance: 10,055 (v Macclesfield Town)
Home colours	Away colours

The 2008–09 season saw West Ham United compete in the Premier League, where the club finished in 9th place. The beginning of the season was overshadowed by the sudden resignation of manager Alan Curbishley, following the sale of first team players Anton Ferdinand and George McCartney to Sunderland - after Curbishley claimed that these transfers had been authorised without his consent - and the related financial troubles of the club's owners, brought on by the 2008 Icelandic Banking Crisis. The club's owners had their assets frozen by the UK government, with the club narrowly avoiding going into administration as a result. Curbishley was replaced by Italian former Chelsea forward Gianfranco Zola on 9 September.

The club recovered from its off-field troubles, and a relatively poor start to the season, to finish in the top half and were never seriously threatened with relegation after the turn of the year.

== Final league table ==
Pos	Team	Pld	W	D	L	GF	GA	GD	Pts	Qualification or relegation
7	Fulham	38	14	11	13	39	34	+5	53	Qualification for the Europa League third qualifying round (Note: Since both finalists of the FA Cup (Chelsea and Everton) and the League Cup winners (Manchester United) qualified for the European competitions based on their league position, the sixth-placed team (Aston Villa) received a berth in the Europa League play-off round and the seventh-placed team (Fulham) received a berth in the Europa League third qualifying round.)
8	Tottenham Hotspur	38	14	9	15	45	45	0	51	
9	West Ham United	38	14	9	15	42	45	−3	51	
10	Manchester City	38	15	5	18	58	50	+8	50	
11	Wigan Athletic	38	12	9	17	34	45	−11	45	

Source: Barclays Premier League
Rules for classification: 1) points; 2) goal difference; 3) number of goals scored.

== Squad ==
Note: Flags indicate national team as defined under FIFA eligibility rules; some limited exceptions apply. Players may hold more than one non-FIFA nationality.

No.	Pos.	Nation	Player
1	GK	ENG	Robert Green
2	DF	AUS	Lucas Neill (captain)
3	DF	COD	Hérita Ilunga
4	DF	WAL	Danny Gabbidon
5	DF	URU	Walter Lopez
7	MF	ENG	Kieron Dyer
8	MF	ENG	Scott Parker
9	FW	ENG	Dean Ashton
10	FW	GER	Savio Nsereko
11	MF	ENG	Matthew Etherington
12	FW	ENG	Carlton Cole
13	MF	POR	Luís Boa Morte
14	MF	CZE	Radoslav Kovac
15	DF	ENG	Matthew Upson
16	MF	ENG	Mark Noble
17	MF	ENG	Hayden Mullins
18	DF	USA	Jonathan Spector
19	DF	WAL	James Collins

No.	Pos.	Nation	Player
20	MF	FRA	Julien Faubert
21	MF	SUI	Valon Behrami
22	MF	ENG	Tony Stokes
23	GK	ENG	Jimmy Walker
24	GK	CZE	Jan Lastuvka
25	FW	ESP	Diego Tristan
26	MF	SCO	Nigel Quashie
27	DF	ENG	Calum Davenport
28	MF	ENG	Kyel Reid
29	MF	ENG	Lee Bowyer
30	DF	ENG	James Tomkins
31	MF	WAL	Jack Collison
32	FW	ITA	David Di Michele
33	FW	ENG	Freddie Sears
34	GK	CZE	Marek Štěch
41	FW	ENG	Zavon Hines
45	DF	ENG	Jordan Spence
46	MF	ENG	Junior Stanislas

== Results ==
=== Premier League ===
16 August 2008 1	West Ham United	2–1	Wigan Athletic	London
	Ashton 3', 10'	Report	Zaki 47'	Stadium: Boleyn Ground; Attendance: 32,758; Referee: Steve Bennett

24 August 2008 2	Manchester City	3–0	West Ham United	Manchester
	Sturridge 65'; Elano 70', 76'	Report		Stadium: Etihad Stadium; Attendance: 36,635; Referee: Howard Webb

30 August 2008 3	West Ham United	4–1	Blackburn Rovers	London
	Davenport 12'; Samba 20' (o.g.); Cole 89'; Bellamy 90'	Report	Roberts 22'	Stadium: Boleyn Ground; Attendance: 32,905; Referee: Mike Riley

13 September 2008 4	West Bromwich Albion	3–2	West Ham United	West Bromwich
	Morrison 3'; Bednar 37'; Brunt 83'	Report	Noble 29'; Neill 35'	Stadium: The Hawthorns; Attendance: 26,213; Referee: Lee Probert

20 September 2008 5	West Ham United	3–1	Newcastle United	London
	Di Michele 8', 37'; Etherington 53'	Report	Owen 67'	Stadium: Boleyn Ground; Attendance: 34,743; Referee: Phil Dowd

27 September 2008 6	Fulham	1–2	West Ham United	London
	Murphy 59'	Report	Cole 43'; Etherington 45'	Stadium: Craven Cottage; Attendance: 23,946; Referee: Andre Marriner

5 October 2008 7	West Ham United	1–3	Bolton Wanderers	London
	Cole 69'	Report	K. Davies 30'; Cahill 34'; Taylor 86'	Stadium: Boleyn Ground; Attendance: 33,715; Referee: Mike Dean

19 October 2008 8	Hull City	1–0	West Ham United	Kingston-upon-Hull
	Turner 51'	Report		Stadium: KC Stadium; Attendance: 24,896; Referee: Chris Foy

26 October 2008 9	West Ham United	0–2	Arsenal	London
		Report	Faubert 75' (o.g.); Adebayor 90'	Stadium: Boleyn Ground; Attendance: 34,802; Referee: Phil Dowd

29 October 2008 10	Manchester United	2–0	West Ham United	Manchester
	Ronaldo 14', 30'	Report		Stadium: Old Trafford; Attendance: 75,397; Referee: Peter Walton

1 November 2008 11	Middlesbrough	1–1	West Ham United	Middlesbrough
	Mido 83'	Report	Mullins 21'	Stadium: Riverside Stadium; Attendance: 25,164; Referee: Andre Marriner

8 November 2008 12	West Ham United	1–3	Everton	London
	Collison 63'	Report	Lescott 83'; Saha 85', 87'	Stadium: Boleyn Ground; Attendance: 33,961; Referee: Mark Halsey

15 November 2008 13	West Ham United	0–0	Portsmouth	London
		Report		Stadium: Boleyn Ground; Attendance: 32,328; Referee: Martin Atkinson

23 November 2008 14	Sunderland	0–1	West Ham United	Sunderland
		Report	Behrami 20'	Stadium: Stadium of Light; Attendance: 35,222; Referee: Mike Dean

1 December 2008 15	Liverpool	0–0	West Ham United	Liverpool
		Report		Stadium: Anfield; Attendance: 41,169; Referee: Peter Walton

8 December 2008 16	West Ham United	0–2	Tottenham Hotspur	London
		Report	King 68'; O'Hara 90'	Stadium: Boleyn Ground; Attendance: 34,277; Referee: Chris Foy

14 December 2008 17	Chelsea	1–1	West Ham United	London
	Anelka 51'	Report	Bellamy 33'	Stadium: Stamford Bridge; Attendance: 41,675; Referee: Mike Riley

20 December 2008 18	West Ham United	0–1	Aston Villa	London
		Report	Neill 78' (o.g.)	Stadium: Boleyn Ground; Attendance: 31,353; Referee: Mark Halsey

26 December 2008 19	Portsmouth	1–4	West Ham United	Portsmouth
	Belhadj 8'	Report	Collison 20'; Cole 67'; Bellamy 70', 83'	Stadium: Fratton Park; Attendance: 20,102; Referee: Steve Bennett

28 December 2008 20	West Ham United	2–1	Stoke City	London
	Cole 51'; Tristan 88'	Report	Faye 4'	Stadium: Boleyn Ground; Attendance: 34,477; Referee: Michael Jones

10 January 2009 21	Newcastle United	2–2	West Ham United	Newcastle-upon-Tyne
	Owen 19'; Carroll 78'	Report	Bellamy 29'; Cole 55'	Stadium: St James' Park; Attendance: 47,571; Referee: Alan Wiley

18 January 2009 22	West Ham United	3–1	Fulham	London
	Di Michele 7'; Noble 60'; Cole 76'	Report	Konchesky 22'	Stadium: Boleyn Ground; Attendance: 31,818; Referee: Phil Dowd

28 January 2009 23	West Ham United	2–0	Hull City	London
	Di Michele 33'; Cole 51'	Report		Stadium: Boleyn Ground; Attendance: 34,340; Referee: Howard Webb

31 January 2009 24	Arsenal	0–0	West Ham United	London
		Report		Stadium: Emirates Stadium; Attendance: 60,109; Referee: Steve Bennett

8 February 2009 25	West Ham United	0–1	Manchester United	London
		Report	Giggs 62'	Stadium: Boleyn Ground; Attendance: 34,958; Referee: Phil Dowd

21 February 2009 26	Bolton Wanderers	2–1	West Ham United	Bolton
	Taylor 10'; K. Davies 11'	Report	Parker 66'	Stadium: Reebok Stadium; Attendance: 21,245; Referee: Steve Tanner

1 March 2009 27	West Ham United	1–0	Manchester City	London
	Collison 71'	Report		Stadium: Boleyn Ground; Attendance: 34,562; Referee: Mike Dean

4 March 2009 28	Wigan Athletic	0–1	West Ham United	Wigan
		Report	Cole 34'	Stadium: JJB Stadium; Attendance: 14,169; Referee: Stuart Attwell

16 March 2009 29	West Ham United	0–0	West Bromwich Albion	London
		Report		Stadium: Boleyn Ground; Attendance: 30,842; Referee: Mark Halsey

21 March 2009 30	Blackburn Rovers	1–1	West Ham United	Blackburn
	Andrews 51'	Report	Noble 35'	Stadium: Ewood Park; Attendance: 21,672; Referee: Chris Foy

4 April 2009 31	West Ham United	2–0	Sunderland	London
	Stanislas 42'; Tomkins 53'	Report		Stadium: Boleyn Ground; Attendance: 34,761; Referee: Michael Jones

11 April 2009 32	Tottenham Hotspur	1–0	West Ham United	London
	Pavlyuchenko 65'	Report		Stadium: White Hart Lane; Attendance: 35,969; Referee: Martin Atkinson

18 April 2009 33	Aston Villa	1–1	West Ham United	Birmingham
	Heskey 11'	Report	Tristan 85'	Stadium: Villa Park; Attendance: 39,534; Referee: Rob Styles

25 April 2009 34	West Ham United	0–1	Chelsea	London
		Report	Kalou 55'	Stadium: Boleyn Ground; Attendance: 34,749; Referee: Mike Dean

2 May 2009 35	Stoke City	0–1	West Ham United	Stoke-on-Trent
		Report	Tristan 33'	Stadium: Britannia Stadium; Attendance: 27,500; Referee: Peter Walton

9 May 2009 36	West Ham United	0–3	Liverpool	London
		Report	Gerrard 2', 38'; Babel 84'	Stadium: Boleyn Ground; Attendance: 34,951; Referee: Alan Wiley

16 May 2009 37	Everton	3–1	West Ham United	Liverpool
	Saha 38', 76'; Yobo 48'	Report	Kovac 24'	Stadium: Goodison Park; Attendance: 38,501; Referee: Phil Dowd

24 May 2009 38	West Ham United	2–1	Middlesbrough	London
	Cole 33'; Stanislas 58'	Report	O'Neil 50'	Stadium: Boleyn Ground; Attendance: 34,007; Referee: Howard Webb

=== League Cup ===
27 August 2008 Second round	West Ham United	4–1 (a.e.t.)	Macclesfield Town	London
	Bowyer 74'; Cole 100'; Hines 105'; Reid 117'	Report	Evans 5'	Stadium: Boleyn Ground; Attendance: 10,055; Referee: Clive Penton

23 September 2008 Third round	Watford	1–0	West Ham United	Watford
	Mullins 70' (o.g.)	Report		Stadium: Vicarage Road; Attendance: 12,914; Referee: Peter Walton

=== FA Cup ===
3 January 2009 Third round	West Ham United	3–0	Barnsley	London
	Ilunga 10'; Noble 39'; Cole 68'	Report		Stadium: Boleyn Ground; Attendance: 28,869; Referee: Michael Oliver

24 January 2009 Fourth Round	Hartlepool United	0–2	West Ham United	Hartlepool
		Report	Behrami 44'; Noble 45'	Stadium: Victoria Park; Attendance: 6,849; Referee: Lee Mason

14 February 2009 Fifth round	West Ham United	1–1	Middlesbrough	London
	Ilunga 83'	Report	Downing 22'	Stadium: Boleyn Ground; Attendance: 33,658; Referee: Peter Walton

25 February 2009 Fifth round replay	Middlesbrough	2–0	West Ham United	Middlesbrough
	Downing 5'; Tuncay 20'	Report		Stadium: Riverside Stadium; Attendance: 15,602; Referee: Steve Bennett

== Statistics ==
=== Overview ===
Competition	Record							
Competition	P	W	D	L	GF	GA	GD	Win %
Premier League	38	14	9	15	42	45	−3	36.84
FA Cup	4	2	1	1	6	4	+2	50.00
League Cup	2	1	0	1	4	2	+2	50.00
Total	44	17	10	17	52	51	+1	38.64

=== Goalscorers ===
Rank	Pos	No.	Nat	Name	Premier League	FA Cup	League Cup	Total
1	ST	12	(England)	Carlton Cole	10	1	1	12
2	ST	10	(Wales)	Craig Bellamy	5	0	0	5
2	MF	16	(England)	Mark Noble	3	2	0	5
4	ST	32	(Italy)	David Di Michele	4	0	0	4
5	ST	25	(Spain)	Diego Tristan	3	0	0	3
5	MF	31	(Wales)	Jack Collison	3	0	0	3
7	DF	3	(Democratic Republic of the Congo)	Hérita Ilunga	0	2	0	2
7	ST	9	(England)	Dean Ashton	2	0	0	2
7	MF	11	(England)	Matthew Etherington	2	0	0	2
7	MF	21	(Switzerland)	Valon Behrami	1	1	0	2
7	MF	46	(England)	Junior Stanislas	2	0	0	2
12	DF	2	(Australia)	Lucas Neill	1	0	0	1
12	MF	8	(England)	Scott Parker	1	0	0	1
12	MF	14	(Czech Republic)	Radoslav Kovac	1	0	0	1
12	MF	17	(England)	Hayden Mullins	1	0	0	1
12	DF	27	(England)	Calum Davenport	1	0	0	1
12	MF	28	(England)	Kyel Reid	0	0	1	1
12	MF	29	(England)	Lee Bowyer	0	0	1	1
12	DF	30	(England)	James Tomkins	0	0	1	1
12	ST	41	(England)	Zavon Hines	0	0	1	1
12	Own goals				1	0	0	1
Totals					42	6	4	52

=== League position by matchday ===
Matchday	1	2	3	4	5	6	7	8	9	10	11	12	13	14	15	16	17	18	19	20	21	22	23	24	25	26	27	28	29	30	31	32	33	34	35	36	37	38
Ground	H	A	H	A	H	A	H	A	H	A	A	H	H	A	A	H	A	H	A	H	A	H	H	A	H	A	H	A	H	A	H	A	A	H	A	H	A	H
Result	W	L	W	L	W	W	L	L	L	L	D	L	D	W	D	L	D	L	W	W	D	W	W	D	L	L	W	W	D	D	W	L	D	L	W	L	L	W
Position	5	15	4	7	4	5	6	8	10	11	11	13	13	13	13	16	16	17	13	10	10	8	8	8	8	8	7	7	7	7	7	7	7	8	7	9	9	9

A = Away; H = Home; W = Win; D = Draw; L = Loss

=== Appearances and goals ===
No.	Pos	Nat	Player	Total		Premier League		FA Cup		League Cup	
No.	Pos	Nat	Player	Apps	Goals	Apps	Goals	Apps	Goals	Apps	Goals
Goalkeepers
1	GK	(England) ENG	Robert Green	43	0	38	0	4	0	1	0
24	GK	(Czech Republic) CZE	Jan Lastuvka	1	0	0	0	0	0	1	0
Defenders
2	DF	(Australia) AUS	Lucas Neill	37	1	34	1	2	0	1	0
3	DF	(Democratic Republic of the Congo) COD	Hérita Ilunga	39	2	35	0	4	2	0	0
3	MF	(Northern Ireland) NIR	George McCartney	2	0	0+1	0	0	0	1	0
4	DF	(Wales) WAL	Daniel Gabbidon	14	0	10	0	0	0	4	0
5	DF	(Uruguay) URU	Walter Lopez	6	0	0+5	0	0	0	1	0
6	DF	(England) ENG	Matthew Upson	41	0	37	0	2	0	2	0
18	DF	(United States) USA	Jonathan Spector	9	0	4+5	0	0	0	0	0
19	DF	(Wales) WAL	James Collins	21	0	17+1	0	3	0	0	0
27	DF	(England) ENG	Calum Davenport	8	1	7	1	0	0	1	0
30	DF	(England) ENG	James Tomkins	15	1	11+1	1	3	0	0	0
Midfielders
7	MF	(England) ENG	Kieron Dyer	8	0	1+6	0	0+1	0	0	0
8	MF	(England) ENG	Scott Parker	32	1	28	1	3	0	0+1	0
11	MF	(England) ENG	Matthew Etherington	15	2	8+5	2	0+1	0	1	0
13	MF	(Portugal) POR	Luis Boa Morte	32	0	13+14	0	2+1	0	2	0
14	MF	(Czech Republic) CZE	Radoslav Kovac	10	1	8+1	1	1	0	0	0
16	MF	(England) ENG	Mark Noble	34	5	28+1	3	4	2	1	0
17	MF	(England) ENG	Hayden Mullins	21	1	5+12	1	1+1	0	2	0
20	MF	(France) FRA	Julien Faubert	24	0	15+5	0	2	0	2	0
21	MF	(Switzerland) SUI	Valon Behrami	27	2	24	1	2	1	1	0
28	MF	(England) ENG	Kyel Reid	2	1	0	0	0	0	0+2	1
29	MF	(England) ENG	Lee Bowyer	7	1	4+2	0	0	0	1	1
31	MF	(Wales) WAL	Jack Collison	24	3	16+4	3	3+1	0	0	0
35	MF	(England) ENG	Josh Payne	2	0	0+2	0	0	0	0	0
46	MF	(England) ENG	Junior Stanislas	9	2	7+2	2	0	0	0	0
Forwards
9	FW	(England) ENG	Dean Ashton	5	2	4	2	0	0	1	0
10	FW	(Wales) WAL	Craig Bellamy	17	5	13+3	5	1	0	0	0
10	MF	(Germany) GER	Savio Nsereko	11	0	1+9	0	0+1	0	0	0
12	FW	(England) ENG	Carlton Cole	32	12	26+1	10	4	1	0+1	1
25	MF	(Spain) ESP	Diego Tristan	17	3	8+6	3	0+3	0	0	0
32	FW	(Italy) ITA	David Di Michele	34	4	22+8	4	2+1	0	1	0
33	FW	(England) ENG	Freddie Sears	22	0	4+13	0	1+2	0	2	0
41	FW	(England) ENG	Zavon Hines	1	1	0	0	0	0	0+1	1

=== Transfers ===
==== In ====
Date	Nation	Position	Name	Club From	Fee
23 July 2008	(Switzerland)	MF	Valon Behrami	Lazio	£5,000,000
5 September 2008	(Uruguay)	DF	Walter Lopez	Free Agency	Free
14 October 2008	(Spain)	FW	Diego Tristan	Free Agency	Free
20 January 2009	(Germany)	FW	Savio Nsereko	Brescia	£9,000,000

==== Out ====
Date	Nation	Position	Name	Club To	Fee
12 June 2008	(Peru)	MF	Nolberto Solano	Free Agency	Released
15 July 2008	(Ghana)	DF	John Paintsil	Fulham	£6,300,000 (combined with Zamora)
15 July 2008	(England)	FW	Bobby Zamora	Fulham	£6,300,000 (combined with Paintsil)
22 July 2008	(England)	GK	Richard Wright	Ipswich Town	Undisclosed
6 August 2008	(Sweden)	MF	Freddie Ljungberg	Free Agency	Released
27 August 2008	(England)	DF	Anton Ferdinand	Sunderland	£8,000,000
1 September 2008	(Northern Ireland)	DF	George McCartney	Sunderland	Undisclosed
8 January 2009	(England)	MF	Matthew Etherington	Stoke City	Undisclosed
14 January 2009	(Wales)	FW	Craig Bellamy	Manchester City	Undisclosed
26 January 2009	(England)	MF	Hayden Mullins	Portsmouth	Undisclosed

==== Loan In ====
Date	Nation	Position	Name	Club From	Length
4 August 2008	(Czech Republic)	GK	Jan Lastuvka	Shakhtar Donetsk	Full-Season
2 September 2008	(Democratic Republic of the Congo)	DF	Hérita Ilunga	Toulouse	Full-Season
2 September 2008	(Italy)	FW	David Di Michele	Torino	Full-Season
30 January 2009	(Czech Republic)	MF	Radoslav Kovac	Spartak Moscow	Until end of season

==== Loan Out ====
Date	Nation	Position	Name	Club To	Length
21 October 2008	(Scotland)	MF	Nigel Quashie	Birmingham City	One month(extended 24 November and again on 23 December)
27 November 2008	(England)	GK	Jimmy Walker	Colchester United	One month(extended 12 January)
9 January 2009	(England)	MF	Lee Bowyer	Birmingham City	Until end of season
15 January 2009	(England)	MF	Kyel Reid	Wolves	Until end of season
22 January 2009	(Scotland)	MF	Nigel Quashie	Wolves	Until end of season
31 January 2009	(France)	MF	Julien Faubert	Real Madrid	Until end of season
2 February 2009	(England)	DF	Calum Davenport	Sunderland	Until end of season
15 February 2009	(England)	MF	Tony Stokes	Újpest	Until end of season
