= Walter López (footballer, born 1985) =

Uruguayan footballer

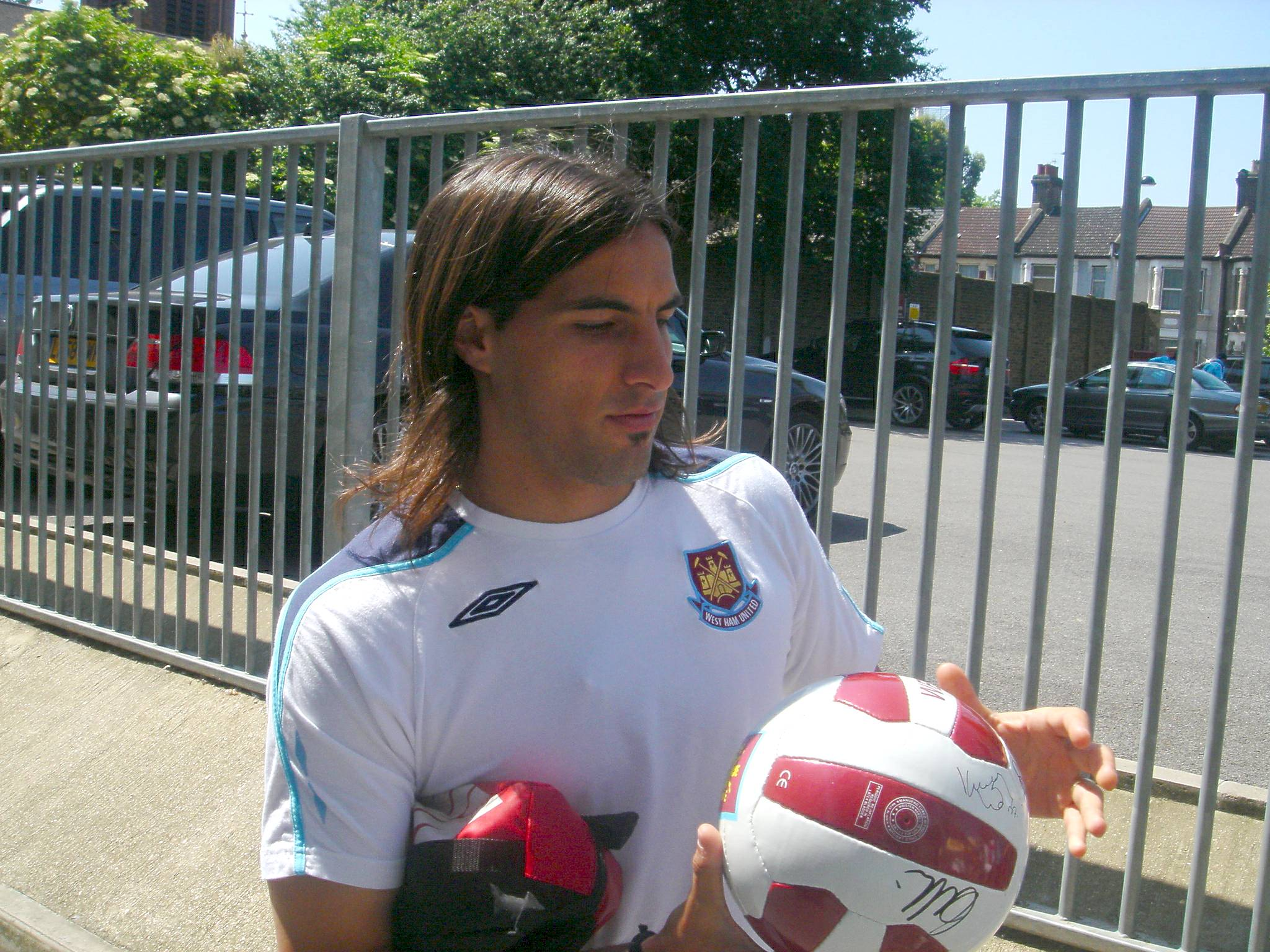
- López at West Ham United in 2009

Personal information
- Full name: Walter Alberto López Gasco
- Date of birth: 15 October 1985 (age 41)
- Place of birth: Montevideo, Uruguay
- Height: 1.82 m (5 ft 11 1/2 in)
- Position: Left back

Senior career*
Years	Team	Apps	(Gls)
2003	Racing Club	0	(0)
2004	San Martín de Tucumán	0	(0)
2005–2006	River Plate Montevideo	46	(5)
2007	→ Xerez (loan)	11	(0)
2007	→ Tecos (loan)	3	(0)
2008–2009	West Ham United	5	(0)
2009–2011	Cerro	0	(0)
2009–2010	→ Brescia (loan)	30	(1)
2010	→ Universitatea Craiova (loan)	0	(0)
2011	Universitatea Craiova	4	(0)
2011–2013	Peñarol	16	(2)
2012	→ Cerro Porteño (loan)	28	(3)
2013–2015	Lecce	55	(2)
2015	Sol de América	20	(1)
2016–2017	Benevento	45	(1)
2017–2018	Spezia	38	(2)
2018–2019	Ternana	19	(2)
2019–2021	Salernitana	51	(0)
2021–2022	Triestina	43	(0)

International career
2006	Uruguay	3	(0)
- * Club domestic league appearances and goals as of 24 April 2022

Walter Alberto López Gasco (born 15 October 1985) is a Uruguayan footballer who plays in defence or midfield.

== Club career ==
Born in Montevideo, López began his career at hometown club Racing Club and spent time in Argentina with San Martín de Tucumán, before moving to Uruguayan Primera División side River Plate Montevideo in 2005. While registered to the club, he spent time on loan in Spain, with Xerez, and in Mexico, with Tecos.

He signed for West Ham United on 5 September 2008. On joining West Ham he was described by caretaker manager Kevin Keen as "a very attacking full-back who can get forward. Like David Di Michele, he is another West Ham-type player who will hopefully show everyone at the club what he can do". Michele had been signed by the club on loan around the same time. López made his debut for West Ham United in a League Cup third round tie, playing the full game in an away defeat at Watford on 23 September 2008. He made his Premier League debut as a late substitute in West Ham's 1–0 win over Manchester City on 1 March 2009.

López failed to cement a place in the first team due to the presence of Congolese international Hérita Ilunga and, having made five substitute Premier League appearances, was subsequently released by West Ham at the end of the 2008–09 season. He returned to Uruguay and signed for Primera División side Cerro. He was then loaned to Brescia of Italy's Serie B. He managed one goal for the Italians, his first outside of South America, in 29 appearances.

In the summer of 2010, López was loaned to Romanian Liga 1 side FC Universitatea Craiova. After a six-month loan, at the start of 2011, the club decided to buy the player and López signed a contract for three years.

In July 2011, López moved back to Uruguay and joined Peñarol. While signed to the club, he spent time on loan at Paraguayan club Cerro Porteño in 2012.

In March 2013, he was arrested and sentenced to 90 days of community service for "crime simulation", after setting fire to his truck and reporting it stolen in order to claim insurance money.

López left Peñarol in September 2013, moving back to Italy to join Serie C club Lecce. After two seasons, he moved once again to Paraguay and joined Sol de América. A further spell in Italy followed, firstly with Campania club Benevento, before moving to Spezia in Liguria in August 2017. On 19 July 2018, he signed a two-year contract with another Serie C club Ternana.

On 31 January 2019, he moved to Serie B club Salernitana.

On 1 February 2021 he signed a 1.5-year contract with Serie C club Triestina.

López also holds a Spanish passport.

== International career ==
López made three appearances for Uruguay in 2006.

== Career statistics ==
=== Club ===
As of match played 6 November 2021

Appearances and goals by club, season and competition
Club	Season	League			National Cup		League Cup		Continental		Other		Total	
Club	Season	Division	Apps	Goals	Apps	Goals	Apps	Goals	Apps	Goals	Apps	Goals	Apps	Goals
Racing Club	2003	Uruguayan Segunda División	0	0	—		—		—		—		0	0
San Martín de Tucumán	2004–05	Argentino B	0	0	—		—		—		—		0	0
River Plate Montevideo	2005	Uruguayan Primera División	2	1	—		—		—		—		2	1
River Plate Montevideo	2005–06	Uruguayan Primera División	31	3	—		—		—		—		31	3
River Plate Montevideo	2006–07	Uruguayan Primera División	11	1	—		—		—		—		11	1
River Plate Montevideo	2007–08	Uruguayan Primera División	2	0	—		—		—		—		2	0
River Plate Montevideo	Total		46	5	0	0	0	0	0	0	0	0	46	5
Xerez (loan)	2006–07	Segunda División	11	0	0	0	—		—		—		11	0
Tecos (loan)	2007–08	Primera División de México	3	0	0	0	—		—		—		3	0
West Ham United	2008–09	Premier League	5	0	0	0	1	0	—		—		6	0
Brescia (loan)	2009–10	Serie B	30	1	0	0	—		—		2 (Note: Appearance(s) in Promotion Playoffs)	0	32	1
Universitatea Craiova	2010–11	Liga I	4	0	1	0	—		—		—		5	0
Peñarol	2011–14	Uruguayan Primera División	13	2	—		—		—		—		13	2
Peñarol	2012–13	Uruguayan Primera División	3	0	—		—		3 (Note: Appearance(s) in Copa Libertadores)	0	—		6	0
Peñarol	Total		16	2	0	0	0	0	3	0	0	0	19	2
Cerro Porteño (loan)	2012	Paraguayan Primera División	28	3	—		—		7 (Note: Appearance(s) in Copa Sudamericana)	1	—		35	4
Lecce	2013–14	Lega Pro 1	24	2	0	0	—		—		5	0	29	2
Lecce	2014–15	Lega Pro	31	0	2	0	1	0	—		—		34	0
Lecce	Total		55	2	2	0	1	0	0	0	5	0	63	2
Sol de América	2015	Paraguayan Primera División	20	1	0	0	—		—		—		20	1
Benevento	2015–16	Lega Pro	15	0	0	0	—		—		2 (Note: Appearance(s) in Supercoppa di Serie C)	0	17	0
Benevento	2016–17	Serie B	30	1	1	0	—		—		5	0	36	1
Benevento	Total		45	1	1	0	0	0	0	0	7	0	53	1
Spezia	2017–18	Serie B	38	2	0	0	—		—		—		38	2
Ternana	2018–19	Serie C	19	2	3	0	—		—		—		22	2
Salernitana	2018–19	Serie B	13	0	0	0	—		—		2 (Note: Appearance(s) in Relegation Playoffs)	0	15	0
Salernitana	2019–20	Serie B	24	0	1	0	—		—		—		25	0
Salernitana	2020–21	Serie B	14	0	1	0	—		—		—		15	0
Salernitana	Total		51	0	2	0	0	0	0	0	2	0	55	0
Triestina	2020–21	Serie C	16	0	—		—		—		1	0	17	0
Triestina	2021–22	Serie C	11	0	—		—		—		—		11	0
Triestina	Total		27	0	0	0	0	0	0	0	1	0	28	0
Career total			398	19	9	0	2	0	10	1	17	0	436	20

== Honours ==
Cerro Porteño

- Paraguayan Primera División: 2012 Apertura

Peñarol

- Uruguayan Primera División: 2012–13
