= Junior Stanislas =

English footballer (born 1989)

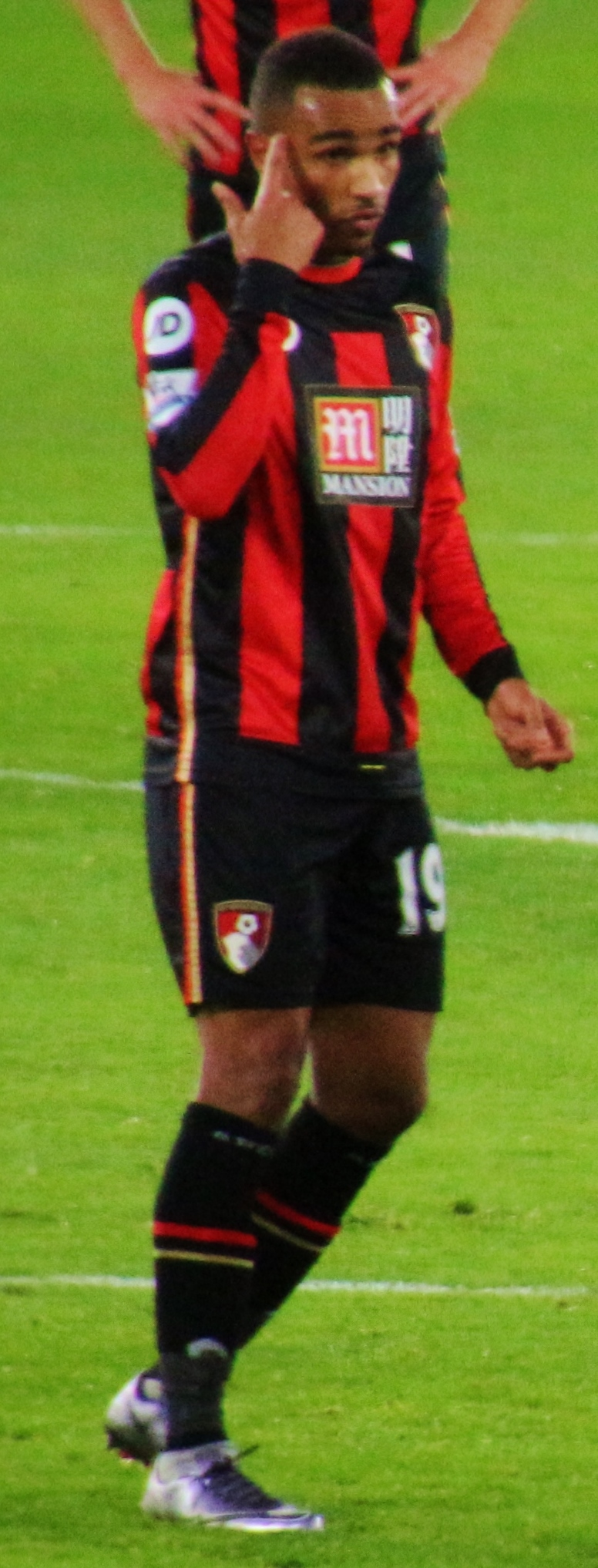
- Stanislas playing for AFC Bournemouth in 2015

Personal information
- Full name: Felix Junior Stanislas
- Date of birth: 26 November 1989 (age 36)
- Place of birth: Kidbrooke, England
- Height: 6 ft 0 in (1.83 m)
- Position: Winger

Youth career
- 2000–2008: West Ham United

Senior career*
Years	Team	Apps	(Gls)
2008–2011	West Ham United	42	(5)
2008–2009	→ Southend United (loan)	6	(1)
2011–2014	Burnley	93	(7)
2014–2023	AFC Bournemouth	158	(31)
Total		299	(44)

International career^{‡}
2009	England U20	1	(0)
2009	England U21	2	(0)
- * Club domestic league appearances and goals as of 03:40, 1 July 2023 (UTC) ‡ National team caps and goals as of 3 September 2009

Felix Junior Stanislas (born 26 November 1989) is an English former professional footballer who played as a winger most notably for club AFC Bournemouth during their two promotion seasons to the Premier League.

He started his career in the youth team of West Ham United at the age of 10 in 2000. He signed a three-year academy contract in the summer of 2006, playing regularly for the under-18 side and reserves. In November 2008, he joined League One club Southend United on a six-week loan. He made his first-team debut for West Ham in March 2009, at the age of 19. He signed a three-and-a-half-year contract in April 2009.

In August 2011, he joined Championship club Burnley on a three-year contract for an undisclosed fee. In June 2014 he signed for Bournemouth on a free transfer, helping them to the Championship title in his first season. He remained at Bournemouth until the end of his playing career and then from 2023 until July 2025 he was the club's under-18s assistant coach.

== Club career ==
=== West Ham United ===
Born in Kidbrooke, London, Stanislas first joined West Ham United as a schoolboy at the age of 10. In May 2006, Stanislas signed a three-year academy scholarship. He made his Premier Academy League debut in a 3–2 defeat to Watford on 8 April 2006, at the age of 16. He became a regular for the academy in the 2006–07 season, appearing 26 times and scoring 9 goals as West Ham finished as runners-up to Arsenal. He carried his goalscoring form into the 2007–08 season, scoring 10 goals in 24 appearances. He made his Premier Reserve League debut on 29 August 2007, in a 2–1 defeat to Aston Villa. His first goals came in the 8–0 rout over Derby County, as he netted a brace. He was part of the first-team squad that travelled to North America in the summer of 2008 for the pre-season tour. He started the 2008–09 season in the reserves, scoring his first goal of the season on 21 October 2008, in a 1–0 home win over Arsenal.

==== Loan to Southend United ====
On 27 November 2008, Stanislas joined League One club Southend United on loan for six weeks. He made an immediate impact on his professional debut, scoring a brace, including a spectacular free kick, against Luton Town in the FA Cup second round on 29 November. His league debut came on 6 December in a 3–0 defeat, away at Leicester City. His first goal for Southend came on 26 December as he scored the only goal in a 1–0 win over Northampton Town, which brought to end a run of seven league games without victory. He was part of the side that earned a memorable 1–1 draw with Chelsea at Stamford Bridge in the FA Cup third round. However, Southend could not repeat their heroics at Roots Hall as the Shrimpers lost 4–1 in the replay. Stanislas returned to West Ham on 19 January 2009, after a 3–1 defeat to Stockport County at Edgeley Park. He made a total of nine appearances in all competitions, scoring three goals.

==== Return to West Ham ====
Stanislas made his West Ham and Premier League debut on 16 March 2009 against bottom of the table West Bromwich Albion, replacing Savio Nsereko in the second half. He scored his first goal on his first start for the club, in a 2–0 home win against Sunderland on 4 April. On 9 April, he signed his first professional contract, a long-term four-and-a-half-year deal, lasting until the summer of 2013. He had an extended run in the first-team when first choice midfielders Valon Behrami and Jack Collison were both out injured. On 24 May, the last game of the season, Stanislas scored the winner in the 2–1 win over Middlesbrough, which sealed Boro's relegation to the Championship. He made a total of nine appearances for West Ham, scoring two goals in the 2008–09 season.

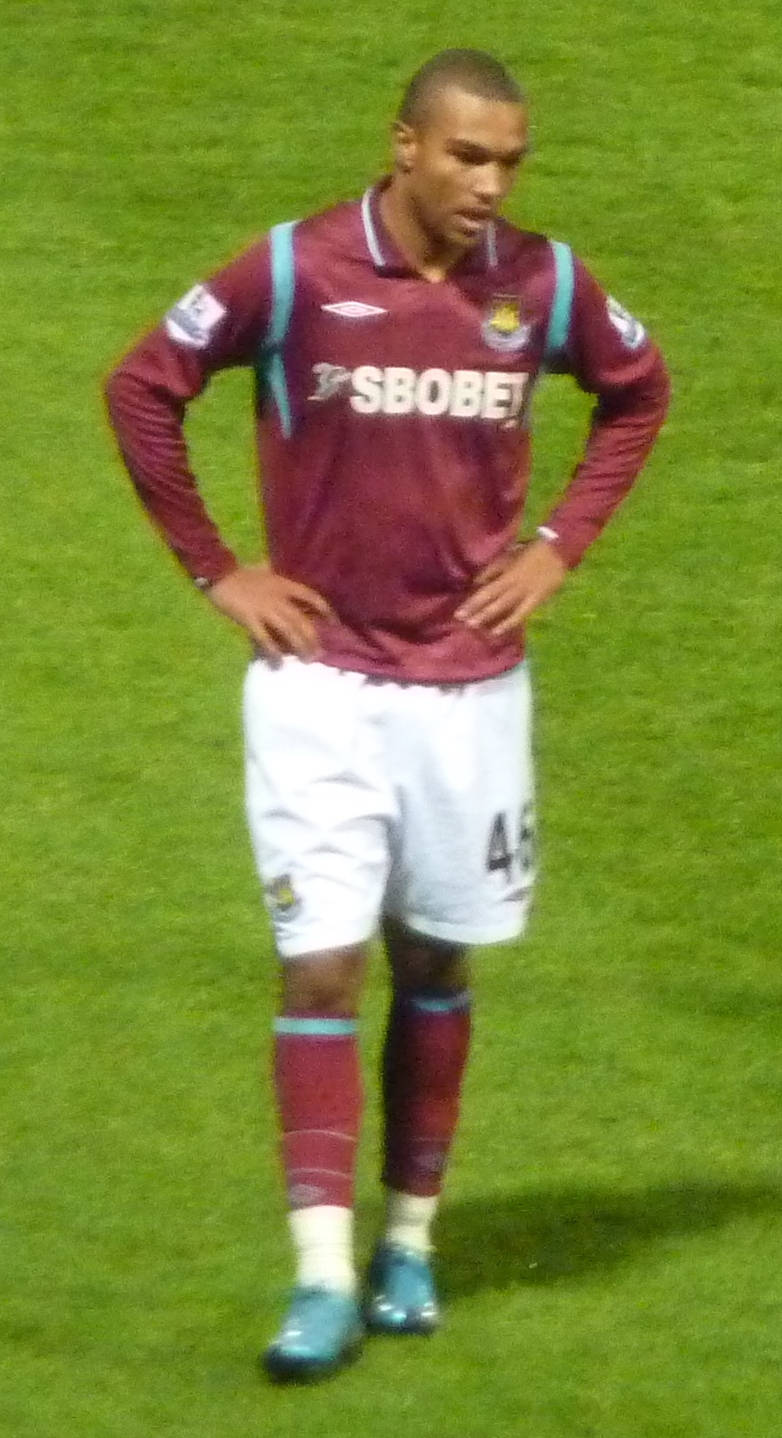
Stanislas with West Ham in January 2010

Stanislas started the 2009–10 season as a first team regular featuring in the first five games, including a 2–0 away win over Wolverhampton Wanderers. He also scored a brace in West Ham's 3–1 League Cup second round victory over arch-rivals Millwall in August 2009. The first goal came three minutes from time before scoring a penalty kick winner in extra time. However, the game was marred by the 2009 Upton Park riot which included pitch invasions after both of Stanislas' goals. His second goal of the season came on 4 October 2009, when he came off the bench to score a last minute equaliser in a 2–2 draw with Fulham. His final goal of the season was on 28 November 2009, scoring the second goal in a 5–3 win over Burnley. He remained a first-team player until the end of the season featuring heavily in the run-in as West Ham secured their Premier League safety. Stanislas made a total of 28 appearances in all competitions, scoring four goals in the 2009–10 season.

In the summer of 2010, Gianfranco Zola was replaced by Avram Grant as manager and Stanislas found himself down the pecking order at Upton Park. His first appearance of the season was on 24 August 2010, in a 1–0 win over Oxford United in the League Cup. He had a prolonged spell in the first team during November and December, making five appearances. On 18 December 2010, he scored the equalising goal against Blackburn Rovers in a 1–1 draw at Ewood Park, after coming on as a substitute for Pablo Barrera in the second half. His final game of the season was on 1 January 2011, in a 2–0 win over Wolverhampton Wanderers. In January 2011, he was ruled out until the end of the season after undergoing hernia surgery. After four months out, he made his comeback for the reserves on 11 May, playing 30 minutes in a 3–2 defeat to Tottenham Hotspur. He made a total of eight appearances in all competitions, scoring one goal in the 2010–11 season as West Ham were relegated to the Championship.

The summer again brought a change of manager with Sam Allardyce replacing the departed Avram Grant. His first game of the season was in the league game against Doncaster Rovers on 13 August 2011, coming on as a late substitute for Herita Ilunga in a 1–0 victory. On 24 August 2011, he scored his first goal of the season in what proved to be his final appearance for the Hammers, in their 2–1 League Cup defeat to Aldershot Town.

=== Burnley ===
On 31 August 2011, Stanislas joined fellow Championship club Burnley on a three-year contract for an undisclosed fee, becoming the club's seventh summer signing. He stated the main reason for leaving West Ham was due to lack of game time. His debut for the Clarets came on 10 September, in a 2–0 defeat to Middlesbrough at Turf Moor, coming on as a second-half substitute for Keith Treacy. His first start for the club came on 24 September, in a 1–1 draw with Southampton. He provided two assists three days later for Jay Rodriguez in the 5–1 drubbing of Nottingham Forest. On 3 December, he returned to his old club as Burnley secured a 2–1 victory, with Stanislas providing the assist for the Chris McCann equaliser. In January 2012, he sustained a hamstring injury against Middlesbrough which kept him sidelined for two months. His return came on 10 March 2012, in a 1–1 home draw with Crystal Palace, coming on in the final few minutes for Martin Paterson. His final appearance of the season was in the 1–1 draw with Bristol City as Burnley finished mid-table. Stanislas made a total of 32 appearances in his debut season for Burnley, scoring no goals.

In his second season at Turf Moor, Stanislas was again a regular first-teamer; appearing in all but 11 league matches and scoring five goals.

=== AFC Bournemouth ===
On 26 June 2014, Stanislas joined AFC Bournemouth. He had been offered a new contract at Turf Moor, but this was turned down in favour of reuniting with former manager Eddie Howe.

He made his debut for the Cherries on 9 August, coming on in added time for Marc Pugh as they began the season with a 4–0 win at Huddersfield Town. A week later, six minutes after coming off the bench, he finished Ryan Fraser's cross for the only goal at Dean Court against Brentford; this was his only goal in 13 appearances as Bournemouth won the title, earning their first promotion to the Premier League. On 3 January 2015, in the third round of the FA Cup, Stanislas put Bournemouth in the lead as they came from behind to win 5–1 at Rotherham United.

On 25 August 2015, Stanislas scored in each half as Bournemouth defeated Hartlepool United 4–0 at the Victoria Ground in the second round of the League Cup. His first Premier League goals for the club came on 28 November, two late strikes to seal a 3–3 home draw against Everton. Two weeks later, Stanislas opened the scoring in the second minute of an eventual 2–1 win over Manchester United, scoring directly from a corner kick.

On 2 June 2023, it was announced that Stanislas was to leave Bournemouth at the end of his contract, after nine years at the club.

On 12 October 2023, Stanislas confirmed his retirement from professional football at the age of 33, having been a free agent since the summer, citing injuries as a large factor for doing so. He then stated that he aimed to start a career in coaching.

== International career ==
Stanislas has been capped for England at under-19, under-20 and under-21 level. He was called up to the England U19 squad for the first time in November 2007, along with West Ham teammate, James Tomkins, for a friendly against Germany. His second call-up came in February 2008, for a friendly against Croatia at the County Ground, Swindon. On 31 March 2009, he made his debut for the England U20's in a 2–0 win over Italy, coming on as a substitute for Scott Sinclair in a friendly at Loftus Road. He received his first call-up to the England U21 side for a friendly against the Netherlands on 11 August 2009 and made his debut starting in the 0–0 draw. In September 2009, Stuart Pearce then named him in the squad for the 2011 European Championship qualifiers against Macedonia and Greece. His final appearance for the team on 4 September, in the 2–1 victory over Macedonia, before being an unused substitute in the 1–1 draw with Greece four days later.

He is eligible to play for the Saint Lucia national team through his father, Felix. In November 2020, he said he was open to the idea of representing Saint Lucia despite initially saying as an England under-21 player that he only wanted to play for England: "I just wanted to represent England [at the time]. That hasn't happened so far and I'm getting on a bit now, but you never know. It wasn't a case of not wanting to play for St Lucia but having been born and raised in England, I would have preferred to play for England."

== Coaching career ==
Whilst still playing, Stanislas completed his UEFA A License alongside Bournemouth teammate Steve Cook, having helped coach Bournemouth's under-15's with Callum Wilson and Simon Francis in 2018. Following his retirement, Stanislas was appointed under-18 assistant coach at Bournemouth.

Stanislas was appointed first team coach at Ipswich Town in July 2025, before departing at the end of the season.

== Personal life ==
Stanislas went to Catholic school as a child and Crown Woods School in Eltham in his teens. He remains a devout Christian today. His favourite stadium to play at is Old Trafford.

== Career statistics ==
As of match played 22 May 2023

Appearances and goals by club, season and competition
Club	Season	League			FA Cup		League Cup		Other		Total	
Club	Season	Division	Apps	Goals	Apps	Goals	Apps	Goals	Apps	Goals	Apps	Goals
West Ham United	2008–09	Premier League	9	2	—		0	0	—		9	2
West Ham United	2009–10	Premier League	26	2	1	0	1	2	—		28	4
West Ham United	2010–11	Premier League	6	1	0	0	2	0	—		8	1
West Ham United	2011–12	Championship	1	0	—		1	1	—		2	1
West Ham United	Total		42	5	1	0	4	3	—		47	8
Southend United (loan)	2008–09	League One	6	1	3	2	—		—		9	3
Burnley	2011–12	Championship	31	0	1	0	—		—		32	0
Burnley	2012–13	Championship	35	5	0	0	2	0	—		37	5
Burnley	2013–14	Championship	27	2	1	0	4	1	—		32	3
Burnley	Total		93	7	2	0	6	1	—		101	8
AFC Bournemouth	2014–15	Championship	13	1	2	1	5	0	—		20	2
AFC Bournemouth	2015–16	Premier League	21	3	1	0	3	2	—		25	5
AFC Bournemouth	2016–17	Premier League	21	7	0	0	1	0	—		22	7
AFC Bournemouth	2017–18	Premier League	19	5	0	0	1	0	—		20	5
AFC Bournemouth	2018–19	Premier League	23	2	1	0	3	2	—		27	4
AFC Bournemouth	2019–20	Premier League	15	3	1	0	0	0	—		16	3
AFC Bournemouth	2020–21	Championship	35	10	1	1	0	0	—		36	11
AFC Bournemouth	2021–22	Championship	7	0	0	0	1	0	—		8	0
AFC Bournemouth	2022–23	Premier League	4	0	0	0	1	1	—		5	1
AFC Bournemouth	Total		159	31	6	2	15	5	—		179	38
Career total			299	44	12	4	25	9	—		336	55

== Honours ==
Bournemouth

- Football League/EFL Championship: 2014–15; runner-up: 2021–22
