= 2011–12 West Ham United F.C. season =

English football team season

West Ham United
2011–12 season
- Chairmen: David Gold; David Sullivan
- Manager: Sam Allardyce
- Home stadium: Boleyn Ground
- Championship: 3rd (promoted via the playoffs)
- FA Cup: Third round
- League Cup: First round
- Top goalscorer: League: Carlton Cole (14); All: Carlton Cole (15)
- Highest home attendance: 35,000 v Hull City; 28 April 2012
- Lowest home attendance: 19,879 v Aldershot Town; 24 August 2011
Home colours	Away colours	Third colours

The 2011–12 season was West Ham United's first season back in the Football League Championship, after being relegated from the Premier League at the conclusion of 2010–11 campaign. They also competed in the League Cup and the FA Cup. It was their first season under Sam Allardyce, who was appointed in May 2011 after the sacking of the club's previous manager, Avram Grant. On 19 May 2012, West Ham gained promotion back to the Premier League at the first attempt, as they won the play-off final by defeating Blackpool 2–1 at Wembley.

== Season summary ==
Sam Allardyce was appointed as the club's new manager on 1 June 2011, after his predecessor Avram Grant was sacked following the club's relegation with a 3–2 defeat at Wigan Athletic.

For the majority of the season West Ham looked on course for automatic promotion, and even briefly topped the division on 1 March, but eventually finished third, after being beaten to automatic promotion by Southampton on the final day of the season, despite a 2–1 win against Hull City. Failure to win a league game in March saw West Ham overtaken by Reading, who defeated the Hammers 4–2 in a key game at Upton Park, and Southampton. and despite a late rally the team had to settle for a play-off place. West Ham's 13 away wins constituted a club record for any league season. They also recorded the fewest defeats (8) of any team in the Championship this season and had the second best goal difference, but 14 draws saw the club miss out on automatic promotion.

West Ham faced Cardiff City in the semi-finals of the play-offs, with the Hammers comfortably beating the Bluebirds 5–0 on aggregate. West Ham then sealed their promotion back to the Premier League on 19 May 2012, beating Blackpool 2–1 at Wembley with goals from Carlton Cole and Ricardo Vaz Tê. This was West Ham's first appearance at the national stadium since the 1981 League Cup Final.

== League table ==
Pos	Team	Pld	W	D	L	GF	GA	GD	Pts	Promotion or relegation
1	Reading (C, P)	46	27	8	11	69	41	+28	89	Promotion to the Premier League
2	Southampton (P)	46	26	10	10	85	46	+39	88	Promotion to the Premier League
3	West Ham United (O, P)	46	24	14	8	81	48	+33	86	Qualification for Championship play-offs
4	Birmingham City	46	20	16	10	78	51	+27	76	Qualification for Championship play-offs
5	Blackpool	46	20	15	11	79	59	+20	75	Qualification for Championship play-offs

Updated to match(es) played on 28 April 2012. Source: BBC Sport
Rules for classification: 1) points; 2) goal difference; 3) number of goals scored.
(C) Champions; (O) Play-off winners; (P) Promoted

== Squad ==
Note: Flags indicate national team as defined under FIFA eligibility rules; some limited exceptions apply. Players may hold more than one non-FIFA nationality.

No.	Pos.	Nation	Player
1	GK	ENG	Robert Green
2	DF	NZL	Winston Reid
3	DF	NIR	George McCartney
4	MF	ENG	Kevin Nolan (captain)
5	DF	ENG	James Tomkins
7	FW	ENG	Sam Baldock
8	FW	ENG	Nicky Maynard
9	FW	ENG	Carlton Cole
10	MF	WAL	Jack Collison
11	FW	NOR	John Carew
12	FW	POR	Ricardo Vaz Te
14	MF	ENG	Matthew Taylor
15	DF	SEN	Abdoulaye Faye
16	MF	ENG	Mark Noble (vice-captain)

No.	Pos.	Nation	Player
17	DF	IRL	Joey O'Brien
18	DF	FRA	Julien Faubert
20	DF	CIV	Guy Demel
21	MF	SEN	Papa Bouba Diop
22	MF	ENG	Henri Lansbury (on loan from Arsenal)
23	MF	ENG	Ravel Morrison
24	FW	ENG	Frank Nouble
25	DF	WAL	Danny Collins
26	FW	PAR	Brian Montenegro
28	GK	HUN	Peter Kurucz
29	GK	CZE	Marek Štěch
32	MF	ENG	Gary O'Neil
46	FW	ENG	Robert Hall
48	DF	ENG	Danny Potts

=== Out on loan ===
No.	Pos.	Nation	Player
12	MF	MEX	Pablo Barrera (at Real Zaragoza)
30	FW	FRA	Frédéric Piquionne (at Doncaster Rovers)

== Results ==
=== Pre-season ===
11 July 2011	Young Boys Bern	2–1	West Ham United	Grenchen, Switzerland
	Schneuwly 17'; Affolter 39'	Report	Nouble 21'	Stadium: Stadion Brühl

13 July 2011	FC Basel	2–1	West Ham United	Grenchen, Switzerland
	Pak 53'; Yapi 90+3' (pen.)	Report	Stanislas 75' (pen.)	Stadium: Stadion Brühl

20 July 2011	FC Copenhagen	0–1	West Ham United	Copenhagen, Denmark
		Report	Sears 89'	Stadium: Parken Stadium; Attendance: 8,907

23 July 2011	Wycombe Wanderers	0–0	West Ham United	High Wycombe
		Report		Stadium: Adams Park; Attendance: 4,352

26 July 2011	Dagenham & Redbridge	0–1	West Ham United	Dagenham
		Report	Cole 35'	Stadium: Victoria Road; Attendance: 4,016

30 July 2011	West Ham United	2–0	Real Zaragoza	London
	Taylor 24'; Sears 89'	Report		Stadium: Upton Park

=== Championship ===
7 August 2011	West Ham United	0–1	Cardiff City	London
13:00		Report	Miller 90+1'	Stadium: Upton Park; Attendance: 25,680; Referee: Howard Webb

13 August 2011	Doncaster Rovers	0–1	West Ham United	Doncaster
15:00		Report	Nolan 5'	Stadium: Keepmoat Stadium; Attendance: 11,344; Referee: Scott Mathieson

16 August 2011	Watford	0–4	West Ham United	Watford
19:45		Report	Tomkins 3'; O'Brien 45'; Cole 71'; Parker 90+1'	Stadium: Vicarage Road; Attendance: 14,747; Referee: Dean Whitestone

21 August 2011	West Ham United	2–2	Leeds United	London
13:15	Cole 6'; Kisnorbo 62' (o.g.)	Report	McCormack 59'; Clayton 90+1'	Stadium: Upton Park; Attendance: 28,252; Referee: Michael Oliver

28 August 2011	Nottingham Forest	1–4	West Ham United	Nottingham
13:15	Findley 70'	Report	Chambers 21' (o.g.); Nolan 24'; Cole 32'; Reid 77'	Stadium: City Ground; Attendance: 21,379; Referee: Graham Salisbury

10 September 2011	West Ham United	4–3	Portsmouth	London
15:00	Taylor 9'; Lansbury 53'; Noble 72' (pen.); Cole 76'; Piquionne (red card) 90+4'	Report	Varney 8'; Norris 60'; Halford 90+7' (pen.)	Stadium: Upton Park; Attendance: 33,465; Referee: Roger East

17 September 2011	Millwall	0–0	West Ham United	London
12:30		Report		Stadium: The Den; Attendance: 16,078; Referee: Lee Mason

24 September 2011	West Ham United	1–0	Peterborough United	London
15:00	Noble 11' (pen.)	Report		Stadium: Upton Park; Attendance: 29,895; Referee: Anthony Bates

27 September 2011	West Ham United	0–1	Ipswich Town	London
19:45		Report	Bowyer 89'	Stadium: Upton Park; Attendance: 27,709; Referee: Keith Stroud

1 October 2011	Crystal Palace	2–2	West Ham United	London
15:00	Ambrose 6'; Murray 52'	Report	Nolan 16'; Carew 80'	Stadium: Selhurst Park; Attendance: 20,074; Referee: Kevin Wright

15 October 2011	West Ham United	4–0	Blackpool	London
15:00	Carew 12'; Baldock 47' 51'; Collison 57'	Report		Stadium: Upton Park; Attendance: 31,448; Referee: Andy D'Urso

18 October 2011	Southampton	1–0	West Ham United	Southampton
19:45	Hooiveld 45'	Report		Stadium: St Mary's Stadium; Attendance: 32,152; Referee: Darren Deadman

24 October 2011	Brighton & Hove Albion	0–1	West Ham United	Brighton
19:45		Report	Nolan 17'	Stadium: Falmer Stadium; Attendance: 20,686; Referee: Kevin Friend

29 October 2011	West Ham United	3–2	Leicester City	London
15:00	Baldock 20', 71'; Faubert 22'	Report	King 59', 75'	Stadium: Upton Park; Attendance: 30,410; Referee: James Linington

1 November 2011	West Ham United	0–0	Bristol City	London
19:45		Report		Stadium: Upton Park; Attendance: 27,980; Referee: Mark Heywood

5 November 2011	Hull City	0–2	West Ham United	Kingston upon Hull
15:00		Report	Baldock 49'; Collison 57'	Stadium: KC Stadium; Attendance: 21,756; Referee: Nigel Miller

19 November 2011	Coventry City	1–2	West Ham United	Coventry
15:00	Platt 33'	Report	Cole 69'; Piquionne 75'	Stadium: Ricoh Arena; Attendance: 20,524; Referee: Keith Stroud

26 November 2011	West Ham United	3–1	Derby County	London
17:20	Cole 44'; Nolan 64'; Noble 74' (pen.)	Report	Priskin 34'	Stadium: Upton Park; Attendance: 27,864; Referee: Colin Webster

29 November 2011	Middlesbrough	0–2	West Ham United	Middlesbrough
19:45		Report	Piquionne 9'; Cole 90+4'	Stadium: Riverside Stadium; Attendance: 18,457; Referee: Mike Dean

3 December 2011	West Ham United	1–2	Burnley	London
15:00	Nolan 52'	Report	McCann 57'; Vokes 75'	Stadium: Upton Park; Attendance: 26,274; Referee: Fred Graham

10 December 2011	Reading	3–0	West Ham United	Reading
15:00	Pearce 66'; Church 80' 86'	Report	O'Brien (red card) 65'; Collison (red card) 84'	Stadium: Madejski Stadium; Attendance: 24,026; Referee: Neil Swarbrick

17 December 2011	West Ham United	1–0	Barnsley	London
15:00	Diop 6'	Report		Stadium: Upton Park; Attendance: 34,749; Referee: Scott Mathieson

26 December 2011	Birmingham City	1–1	West Ham United	Birmingham
17:30	Murphy 81'	Report	Cole 4'	Stadium: St Andrew's; Attendance: 20,214; Referee: Darren Deadman

31 December 2011	Derby County	2–1	West Ham United	Derby
13:00	Ball 2'; Green 10'	Report	Nouble 42'	Stadium: Pride Park; Attendance: 28,067; Referee: Moss

2 January 2012	West Ham United	1–0	Coventry City	London
15:00	Nolan 66'	Report		Stadium: Upton Park; Attendance: 34,936; Referee: Simon Hooper

14 January 2012	Portsmouth	0–1	West Ham United	Portsmouth
15:00		Report	Noble 24' (pen.)	Stadium: Fratton Park; Attendance: 18,492; Referee: Kevin Friend

21 January 2012	West Ham United	2–1	Nottingham Forest	London
15:00	Noble 45+3' (pen.) 63' (pen.)	Report	McGugan 90+3'	Stadium: Upton Park; Attendance: 31,718; Referee: Anthony Bates

31 January 2012	Ipswich Town	5–1	West Ham United	Ipswich
19:45	Chopra 3'; Murphy 44'; Martin 45+3' (pen.); Emmanuel-Thomas 64', 90+4'	Report	Collison 45'	Stadium: Portman Road; Attendance: 22,185; Referee: Fred Graham

4 February 2012	West Ham United	2–1	Millwall	London
12:30	Nolan (red card) 9'; Cole 45+2'; Reid 69'	Report	Trotter 66'	Stadium: Upton Park; Attendance: 27,774; Referee: Mike Jones

14 February 2012	West Ham United	1–1	Southampton	London
19:45	Taylor (red card) 18'; Noble 21' (pen.)	Report	Hooiveld 75'	Stadium: Upton Park; Attendance: 32,875; Referee: Lee Probert

21 February 2012	Blackpool	1–4	West Ham United	Blackpool
20:00	Phillips 75'	Report	Tomkins 23'; Maynard 32'; Green (red card) 53'; O'Neil 74'; Vaz Tê 90'	Stadium: Bloomfield Road; Attendance: 13,043; Referee: Oliver Langford

25 February 2012	West Ham United	0–0	Crystal Palace	London
12:45		Report		Stadium: Upton Park; Attendance: 34,900; Referee: Graham Salisbury

4 March 2012	Cardiff City	0–2	West Ham United	Cardiff
13:00		Summary	Nolan 43'; McCartney 77'	Stadium: Cardiff City Stadium; Attendance: 23,872; Referee: Chris Foy

7 March 2012	West Ham United	1–1	Watford	London
19:45	Vaz Tê 87'	Report	Murray 68'	Stadium: Upton Park; Attendance: 31,674; Referee: Keith Stroud

10 March 2012	West Ham United	1–1	Doncaster Rovers	London
15:00	Nolan 9'	Report	Coppinger 73'	Stadium: Upton Park; Attendance: 34,650; Referee: Andy D'Urso

17 March 2012	Leeds United	1–1	West Ham United	Leeds
15:00	Becchio 83'	Report	Collins 90'	Stadium: Elland Road; Attendance: 33,366; Referee: Peter Walton

20 March 2012	West Ham United	1–1	Middlesbrough	London
19:45	Bennett 67' (o.g.)	Report	Ogbeche 84'	Stadium: Boleyn Ground; Attendance: 27,250; Referee: Scott Mathieson

24 March 2012	Burnley	2–2	West Ham United	Burnley
15:00	Bartley 25'; Paterson 36'	Report	Nolan 68'; Tomkins 70'	Stadium: Turf Moor; Attendance: 15,246; Referee: Mark Heywood

27 March 2012	Peterborough	0–2	West Ham United	Peterborough
19:45		Report	Vaz Tê 51'; O'Neil 57'	Stadium: London Road Stadium; Attendance: 13,517; Referee: Christopher Sarginson

31 March 2012	West Ham United	2–4	Reading	London
15:00	Cole 8'; Vaz Tê 77'	Report	Gorkšs 44'; Hunt 45+2'; Harte 59' (pen.); Leigertwood 84'	Stadium: Boleyn Ground; Attendance: 33,350; Referee: Chris Foy

6 April 2012	Barnsley	0–4	West Ham United	Barnsley
17:15		Report	Nolan 7'; Maynard 23'; Noble 35'; Vaz Tê 55'	Stadium: Oakwell; Attendance: 11,151; Referee: Anthony Bates

9 April 2012	West Ham United	3–3	Birmingham City	London
17:20 BST	Vaz Té 45+3', 89' (pen.); Cole 70'	Report	Mutch 27'; King 30'; Burke 45+4'	Stadium: Upton Park; Attendance: 31,045; Referee: Jonathan Moss

14 April 2012	West Ham United	6–0	Brighton	London
15:00	Vaz Tê 3', 8', 62'; Nolan 11'; Cole 64'; Dicker 78' (o.g.)	Report		Stadium: Boleyn Ground; Attendance: 32,339; Referee: Roger East

17 April 2012	Bristol City	1–1	West Ham United	Bristol
19:45	Skuse 29'	Report	Tomkins 25'	Stadium: Ashton Gate Stadium; Attendance: 16,669; Referee: Craig Pawson

23 April 2012	Leicester City	1–2	West Ham United	Leicester
19:45	Beckford 34'	Report	Reid 39'; Collison 58'	Stadium: King Power Stadium; Attendance: 23,172; Referee: Eddie Ilderton

28 April 2012	West Ham United	2–1	Hull City	London
12:30	Cole 36', 49'	Report	Evans 81'	Stadium: Boleyn Ground; Attendance: 35,000; Referee: Nigel Miller

=== Championship play-offs ===
3 May 2012 Semi-Final 1st Leg	Cardiff City	0–2	West Ham United	Cardiff
19:45 BST		Report	Collison 9', 41'	Stadium: Cardiff City Stadium; Attendance: 23,029; Referee: Neil Swarbrick

7 May 2012 Semi-Final 2nd Leg	West Ham United	3–0 (5–0 agg.)	Cardiff City	London
16:30 BST	Nolan 15'; Vaz Tê 40'; Maynard 90'	Report		Stadium: Boleyn Ground; Attendance: 34,682; Referee: Mike Dean

19 May 2012 Final	Blackpool	1–2	West Ham United	London
15:00 BST	Ince 48'	Report	Cole 35'; Vaz Tê 87'	Stadium: Wembley Stadium; Attendance: 78,325; Referee: Howard Webb

=== Football League Cup ===
24 August 2011 R1	West Ham United	1–2	Aldershot Town	London
19:45	Stanislas 16'; McNaughton (red card) 47'	Report	Guttridge 78'; Hylton 89'	Stadium: Upton Park; Attendance: 19,879; Referee: Graham Scott

=== FA Cup ===
8 January 2012 R3	Sheffield Wednesday	1–0	West Ham United	Sheffield
15:00	O'Grady 88'; Morrison (yellow card) 90'	Report	O'Neil (yellow card) 17'; Baldock (penalty missed) 49'; McCartney (yellow card) 72'; Potts (yellow card) 90+10'	Stadium: Hillsborough; Attendance: 17,916; Referee: Keith Stroud

== Statistics ==
=== Overview ===
Competition	Record							
Competition	P	W	D	L	GF	GA	GD	Win %
Championship	46	24	14	8	81	48	+33	52.17
Play-offs	3	3	0	0	7	1	+6	100.00
FA Cup	1	0	0	1	0	1	−1	0.00
League Cup	1	0	0	1	1	2	−1	0.00
Total	51	27	14	10	89	52	+37	52.94

=== Goalscorers ===
Rank	Pos	No.	Nat	Name	Championship	Play-offs	FA Cup	League Cup	Total
1	ST	9	(England)	Carlton Cole	14	1	0	0	15
2	MF	4	(England)	Kevin Nolan	12	1	0	0	13
3	ST	12	(Portugal)	Ricardo Vaz Te	10	2	0	0	12
4	MF	16	(England)	Mark Noble	8	0	0	0	8
5	MF	10	(Wales)	Jack Collison	4	2	0	0	6
6	ST	7	(England)	Sam Baldock	5	0	0	0	5
7	DF	5	(England)	James Tomkins	4	0	0	0	4
7	Own goals				4	0	0	0	4
9	DF	2	(New Zealand)	Winston Reid	3	0	0	0	3
9	ST	8	(England)	Nicky Maynard	2	1	0	0	3
11	ST	11	(Norway)	John Carew	2	0	0	0	2
11	ST	30	(France)	Frederic Piquionne	2	0	0	0	2
11	MF	32	(England)	Gary O'Neil	2	0	0	0	2
14	DF	3	(Northern Ireland)	George McCartney	1	0	0	0	1
14	MF	8	(England)	Scott Parker	1	0	0	0	1
14	MF	14	(England)	Matthew Taylor	1	0	0	0	1
14	DF	17	(Republic of Ireland)	Joey O'Brien	1	0	0	0	1
14	DF	18	(France)	Julien Faubert	1	0	0	0	1
14	MF	21	(Senegal)	Papa Bouba Diop	1	0	0	0	1
14	MF	22	(England)	Henri Lansbury	1	0	0	0	1
14	ST	24	(England)	Frank Nouble	1	0	0	0	1
14	DF	25	(Wales)	Danny Collins	1	0	0	0	1
14	MF	25	(England)	Junior Stanislas	0	0	0	1	1
Totals					81	7	0	1	89

=== League position by matchday ===
Round	1	2	3	4	5	6	7	8	9	10	11	12	13	14	15	16	17	18	19	20	21	22	23	24	25	26	27	28	29	30	31	32	33	34	35	36	37	38	39	40	41	42	43	44	45	46
Ground	H	A	A	H	A	H	A	H	H	A	H	A	A	H	H	A	A	H	A	H	A	H	A	A	H	A	H	A	H	H	A	H	A	H	H	A	H	A	A	H	A	H	H	A	A	H
Result	L	W	W	D	W	W	D	W	L	D	W	L	W	W	D	W	W	W	W	L	L	W	D	L	W	W	W	L	W	D	W	D	W	D	D	D	D	D	W	L	W	D	W	D	W	W
Position	22	14	5	7	5	4	5	4	4	4	2	2	2	2	2	2	2	2	2	2	2	2	2	3	2	2	1	1	1	1	1	2	2	2	2	3	3	3	3	3	3	3	3	3	3	3

A = Away; H = Home; W = Win; D = Draw; L = Loss

=== Appearances and goals ===
No.	Pos	Nat	Player	Total		Championship		Play-offs		FA Cup		League Cup	
No.	Pos	Nat	Player	Apps	Goals	Apps	Goals	Apps	Goals	Apps	Goals	Apps	Goals
Goalkeepers
1	GK	(England) ENG	Robert Green	45	0	42	0	3	0	0	0	0	0
13	GK	(Spain) ESP	Manuel Almunia	4	0	4	0	0	0	0	0	0	0
31	GK	(Belgium) BEL	Ruud Boffin	2	0	0	0	0	0	1	0	1	0
Defenders
2	DF	(New Zealand) NZL	Winston Reid	33	3	27+1	3	3	0	1	0	1	0
3	DF	(Northern Ireland) NIR	George McCartney	43	1	36+2	1	0+3	0	1	0	1	0
5	DF	(England) ENG	James Tomkins	47	4	42+2	4	3	0	0	0	0	0
15	DF	(Senegal) SEN	Abdoulaye Faye	29	0	25+4	0	0	0	0	0	0	0
17	DF	(Republic of Ireland) IRL	Joey O'Brien	33	1	27+5	1	0	0	1	0	0	0
20	DF	(Ivory Coast) CIV	Guy Demel	10	0	7	0	3	0	0	0	0	0
23	DF	(Democratic Republic of the Congo) COD	Herita Ilunga	5	0	4	0	0	0	0	0	0+1	0
25	DF	(Wales) WAL	Danny Collins	11	1	4+7	1	0	0	0	0	0	0
37	DF	(England) ENG	Callum McNaughton	1	0	0	0	0	0	0	0	1	0
48	DF	(England) ENG	Danny Potts	4	0	3	0	0	0	1	0	0	0
Midfielders
4	MF	(England) ENG	Kevin Nolan	46	13	42	12	3	1	0	0	1	0
8	MF	(England) ENG	David Bentley	5	0	2+3	0	0	0	0	0	0	0
8	MF	(England) ENG	Scott Parker	4	1	4	1	0	0	0	0	0	0
10	MF	(Wales) WAL	Jack Collison	35	6	26+5	4	3	2	1	0	0	0
12	MF	(Mexico) MEX	Pablo Barrera	2	0	0+1	0	0	0	0	0	1	0
14	MF	(England) ENG	Matthew Taylor	32	1	26+2	1	3	0	0	0	0+1	0
16	MF	(England) ENG	Mark Noble	48	8	43+2	8	3	0	0	0	0	0
18	MF	(France) FRA	Julien Faubert	37	1	28+6	1	0+2	0	0	0	1	0
21	MF	(Senegal) SEN	Papa Bouba Diop	16	1	14+2	1	0	0	0	0	0	0
22	MF	(England) ENG	Henri Lansbury	24	1	13+9	1	0+1	0	1	0	0	0
23	MF	(England) ENG	Ravel Morrison	1	0	0+1	0	0	0	0	0	0	0
25	MF	(England) ENG	Junior Stanislas	2	1	0+1	0	0	0	0	0	1	1
32	MF	(England) ENG	Gary O'Neil	20	2	9+7	2	3	0	1	0	0	0
Forwards
7	FW	(England) ENG	Sam Baldock	24	5	10+13	5	0	0	1	0	0	0
8	FW	(England) ENG	Nicky Maynard	16	3	9+5	2	0+2	1	0	0	0	0
9	FW	(England) ENG	Carlton Cole	43	15	28+12	14	3	1	0	0	0	0
11	FW	(Norway) NOR	John Carew	21	2	7+12	2	0	0	1	0	1	0
12	FW	(Portugal) POR	Ricardo Vaz Te	18	12	13+2	10	3	2	0	0	0	0
19	FW	(England) ENG	Freddie Sears	12	0	2+8	0	0	0	1	0	1	0
24	FW	(England) ENG	Frank Nouble	5	1	1+2	1	0	0	0+1	0	0+1	0
26	FW	(Paraguay) PAR	Brian Montenegro	1	0	0	0	0	0	0+1	0	0	0
30	FW	(France) FRA	Frederic Piquionne	21	2	8+12	2	0	0	0	0	1	0
46	FW	(England) ENG	Robert Hall	4	0	0+3	0	0	0	0+1	0	0	0

== Transfers ==
=== Summer ===
==== In ====
#	Pos	Player	From	Fee	Date	Notes
15	DF	(Senegal) Abdoulaye Faye	Stoke City	Free	14 June 2011	
4	MF	(England) Kevin Nolan	Newcastle United	Undisclosed	16 June 2011	
14	MF	(England) Matt Taylor	Bolton Wanderers	Undisclosed	23 July 2011	
17	MF	(Republic of Ireland) Joey O'Brien	Bolton Wanderers	Free	30 July 2011	
11	FW	(Norway) John Carew	Aston Villa	Free	6 August 2011	
3	DF	(Northern Ireland) George McCartney	Sunderland	Season-long loan	10 August 2011	
7	FW	(England) Sam Baldock	Milton Keynes Dons	Undisclosed	26 August 2011	
26	FW	(Paraguay) Brian Montenegro	(Uruguay) Deportivo Maldonado	Season-long loan	29 August 2011	
21	MF	(Senegal) Papa Bouba Diop	(Greece) AEK Athens	Free	30 August 2011	
8	MF	(England) David Bentley	Tottenham Hotspur	Season-long loan	31 August 2011	
22	MF	(England) Henri Lansbury	Arsenal	Season-long loan	31 August 2011	
20	DF	(Ivory Coast) Guy Demel	(Germany) Hamburger SV	Undisclosed	31 August 2011	

==== Out ====
Pos	Player	To	Fee	Date	Notes
MF	(England) Anthony Edgar	Yeovil Town	Free	16 June 2011	
DF	(Iceland) Hólmar Örn Eyjólfsson	(Germany) VfL Bochum	Free	16 June 2011	
DF	(Wales) Danny Gabbidon	QPR	Free	24 July 2011	
DF	(Denmark) Lars Jacobsen	(Denmark) Copenhagen	Free	16 September 2011	
DF	(United States) Jonathan Spector	Birmingham City	Free	1 August 2011	
DF	(England) Matthew Upson	Stoke City	Free	16 June 2011	
ST	(Senegal) Demba Ba	Newcastle United	Free	17 June 2011	
DF	(Portugal) Manuel da Costa	(Russia) Lokomotiv Moscow	Undisclosed	22 June 2011	
MF	(Germany) Thomas Hitzlsperger	(Germany) VfL Wolfsburg	Contract terminated	22 June 2011	
MF	(Czech Republic) Radoslav Kováč	(Switzerland) FC Basel	Undisclosed	24 June 2011	
MF	(England) Kieron Dyer	QPR	Free	13 July 2011	
MF	(Portugal) Luís Boa Morte	(Greece) AEL	Contract terminated	3 August 2011	
DF	(England) Jordan Spence	Bristol City	Season-long loan	3 August 2011	
MF	(England) Olly Lee	Dagenham & Redbridge	Two-month loan	5 August 2011	
FW	(Colombia) Cristian Montano	Notts County	Two-month loan	5 August 2011	
FW	(England) Zavon Hines	Burnley	Fee set by tribunal	18 August 2011	
MF	(Mexico) Pablo Barrera	(Spain) Real Zaragoza	Season-long loan	26 August 2011	
MF	(England) Scott Parker	Tottenham Hotspur	£5 million	31 August 2011	
MF	(England) Junior Stanislas	Burnley	Undisclosed	31 August 2011	
MF	(Saudi Arabia) Ahmed Abdulla	Swindon Town	Four-month loan	31 August 2011	
DF	(England) Jordan Brown	Aldershot Town	One-month loan	31 August 2011	

=== Winter ===
==== In ====
#	Pos	Player	From	Fee	Date	Notes
13	GK	(Spain) Manuel Almunia	Arsenal	One-month emergency loan	30 September 2011	
25	DF	(United States) George John	(United States) FC Dallas	Two-month loan	13 January 2012	
N/A	ST	(England) Joe Dixon	Unattached	Free	18 January 2012	
23	MF	(England) Ravel Morrison	Manchester United	Undisclosed	31 January 2012	
12	MF	(Portugal) Ricardo Vaz Tê	Barnsley	Undisclosed	31 January 2012	
8	ST	(England) Nicky Maynard	Bristol City	Undisclosed	31 January 2012	
25	DF	(Wales) Danny Collins	Stoke City	Season-long loan	9 March 2012	

==== Out ====
Pos	Player	To	Fee	Date	Notes
DF	(England) Callum McNaughton	AFC Wimbledon	Four-month extended loan	9 September 2011	
FW	(England) Robert Hall	Oxford United	Three-month extended loan	12 September 2011	
FW	(England) Frank Nouble	Gillingham	Three-month extended loan	15 September 2011	
FW	(Colombia) Cristian Montaño	Swindon Town	One-month loan	13 October 2011	
FW	(Colombia) Cristian Montaño	Dagenham & Redbridge	Two-month extended loan	17 November 2011	
GK	(Hungary) Péter Kurucz	Rochdale	One-month loan	2 January 2012	
DF	(England) Callum Driver	Burton Albion	One-month loan	5 January 2012	
DF	(England) Callum McNaughton	AFC Wimbledon	Free	6 January 2012	
MF	(England) George Moncur	AFC Wimbledon	One-month loan	6 January 2012	
MF	(England) Olly Lee	Gillingham	One-month loan	17 February 2012	
GK	(Czech Republic) Marek Štěch	Leyton Orient	One-month emergency loan	24 February 2012	
FW	(France) Frédéric Piquionne	Doncaster Rovers	One-month loan	6 March 2012	
GK	(Belgium) Ruud Boffin		Released	22 April 2012	
