= Jack Collison =

English-Welsh footballer and manager (born 1988)

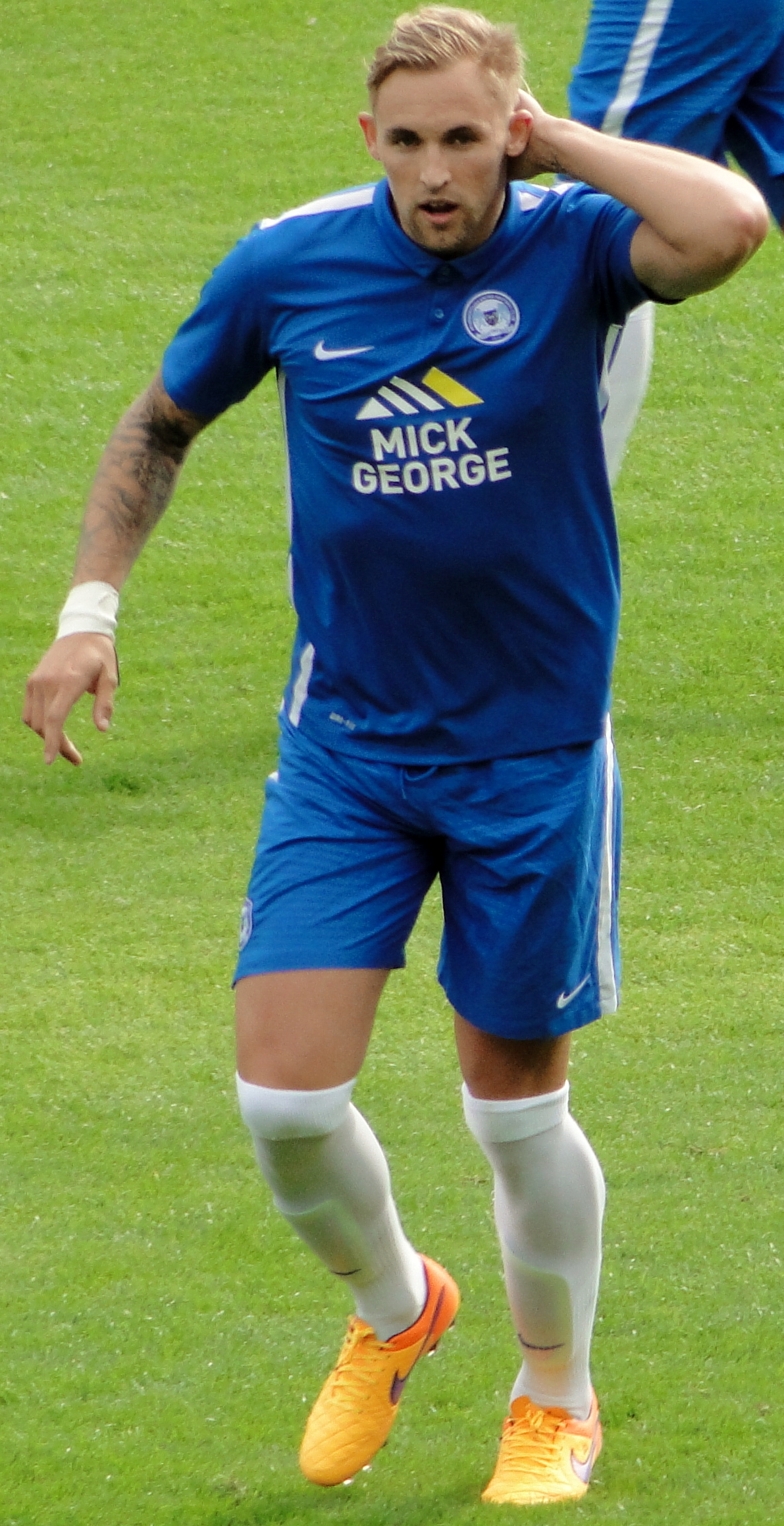
- Collison playing for Peterborough United in 2015

Personal information
- Full name: Jack David Collison
- Date of birth: 2 October 1988 (age 38)
- Place of birth: Watford, England
- Height: 6 ft 0 in (1.83 m)
- Position: Midfielder

Youth career
- 1998–2000: Peterborough United
- 2000–2005: Cambridge United
- 2005–2007: West Ham United

Senior career*
Years	Team	Apps	(Gls)
2007–2014	West Ham United	105	(11)
2013	→ AFC Bournemouth (loan)	4	(0)
2014	→ Wigan Athletic (loan)	9	(0)
2014	Ipswich Town	0	(0)
2015–2016	Peterborough United	10	(0)
Total		128	(11)

International career
2007–2011	Wales U21	7	(2)
2008–2014	Wales	16	(0)

Managerial career
- 2015: Peterborough United U21
- 2015–2017: Peterborough United U18
- 2017–2019: West Ham United U18
- 2019–2021: Atlanta United U17
- 2021–2022: Atlanta United 2
- 2023–2024: Huntsville City
- * Club domestic league appearances and goals

Jack David Collison (born 2 October 1988) is a Welsh football manager and former player who is the Director of Methodology for Southern Soccer Academy Swarm.

Collison began his career with Peterborough United's youth system in 1998, before moving to Cambridge United in 2000, where he stayed for five years. He then moved to West Ham United in 2005 and signed his first professional contract in 2007. Collison played 121 matches and scored 14 goals in seven seasons with the club. After missing a whole year through injury, he spent time on loan at AFC Bournemouth and Wigan Athletic in his final season. He then joined Ipswich Town in 2014, but did not play a single match due to injury, before returning to Peterborough United in 2015 and played in 12 matches. Collison's career was ended through injury in 2016 after 147 career matches. He was capped 15 times for Wales.

== Club career ==
=== Early career ===
Born in Watford, Hertfordshire and raised in Shefford, Bedfordshire, Collison started out at the local club Shefford Saints as a schoolboy. He moved to Peterborough United, and later Cambridge United, but was forced to find another club when Cambridge announced their disbanding of the youth set-up after being relegated from the Football League, due to financial problems.

=== West Ham United ===
==== Early career ====
After leaving Cambridge United, the 17-year-old was offered a trial with West Ham and impressed Academy director Tony Carr enough to be offered a first year scholarship.

Collison continued his development under Carr and his staff at Little Heath before being made reserve team captain at the start of the 2007–08 season. That summer, the teenager also featured in pre-season friendlies against Hornchurch and Milton Keynes Dons. He made his first-team debut on 1 January 2008, when he came on as a substitute for the injured Freddie Ljungberg in their 2–0 Premier League defeat away to Arsenal. Collison was handed his first league start in place of the injured Mark Noble in a 1–0 defeat away to Bolton Wanderers on 11 April 2008.

==== Rise to first-team ====
Collison joined the first-team squad on the pre-season tour of North America where he appeared as a 71st-minute substitute for Scott Parker in the 3–1 win over Major League Soccer club Columbus Crew, followed by a 3–2 defeat to the MLS All-Stars. The 2008–09 season began with Collison in Alex Dyer's reserve team, and a loan move to League One promotion-chasers Peterborough had been lined up. However, an impressive substitute appearance in the 2–0 Premier League loss at Manchester United on 29 October coupled by injury problems in the midfield convinced manager Gianfranco Zola that Collison would be better served by remaining at Chadwell Heath and training with the first-team squad.

Collison repaid Zola's faith with more solid performances. He scored his first goal for West Ham, an 18-yard strike, on 8 November in a 3–1 defeat at home to Everton, after coming on as a substitute for the injured Matthew Upson to make his home debut. Collison's good form earned him praise from Zola, who rewarded the 20-year-old with a new five-year contract extension in December, keeping him at the club until the summer of 2013. On Boxing Day, he scored the equaliser at Portsmouth and had a hand in the next two goals in a 4–1 rout. Collison scored his third goal of the season, the only goal of the match in a 1–0 win at home to Manchester City on 1 March 2009. Although he mostly played in centre midfield during his days in the reserves, he eventually established himself as first-choice on the left side of Zola's midfield diamond.

In a 1–0 win away at Wigan Athletic three days later, Collison dislocated his kneecap while attempting to chest down a long ball and was ruled out for six weeks. He returned to the first-team two months later, coming on as an 82nd-minute substitute in a 1–0 win away at Stoke City. On 24 May, he finished the season on a high, by assisting Junior Stanislas to score the winner, in a 2–1 win at home to Middlesbrough. Collison ended the season having made 24 appearances in all competitions, before being named Young Hammer of the Year by Tony Carr.

On 23 August 2009, Collison played 89 minutes of a 2–1 defeat at home to Tottenham Hotspur, before learning that his father had been killed in a motorcycle accident, while travelling to the game. Two days later, he started a League Cup match against Millwall that went into extra time and ended 3–1 to West Ham. His teammates all wore black armbands to show their support. The match also featured a number of pitch invasions and violent clashes between fans outside the ground. After full-time, Collison left the pitch in tears visibly upset. During the post-match interview, manager Gianfranco Zola complimented Collison's character in light of his father's death. After missing most of September's games due to the recurrence of the knee injury suffered at Wigan during the previous season, Collison returned to training in October and made his comeback on 9 October in a behind-closed-doors friendly against French club Valenciennes and scored one goal. He then marked his return to league action by being named in the starting lineup in a 2–1 defeat away to Stoke City eight days later. Collison scored his first goals of the season in consecutive matches, against Hull City and Burnley. Having not played since Wales' 1–0 defeat to Sweden on 3 March 2010, on 7 May 2010, it was announced that Collison would be out for around nine months after undergoing knee surgery, having never fully recovered from the cartilage damage he suffered in the 2008–09 season.

==== Return from injury and promotion ====
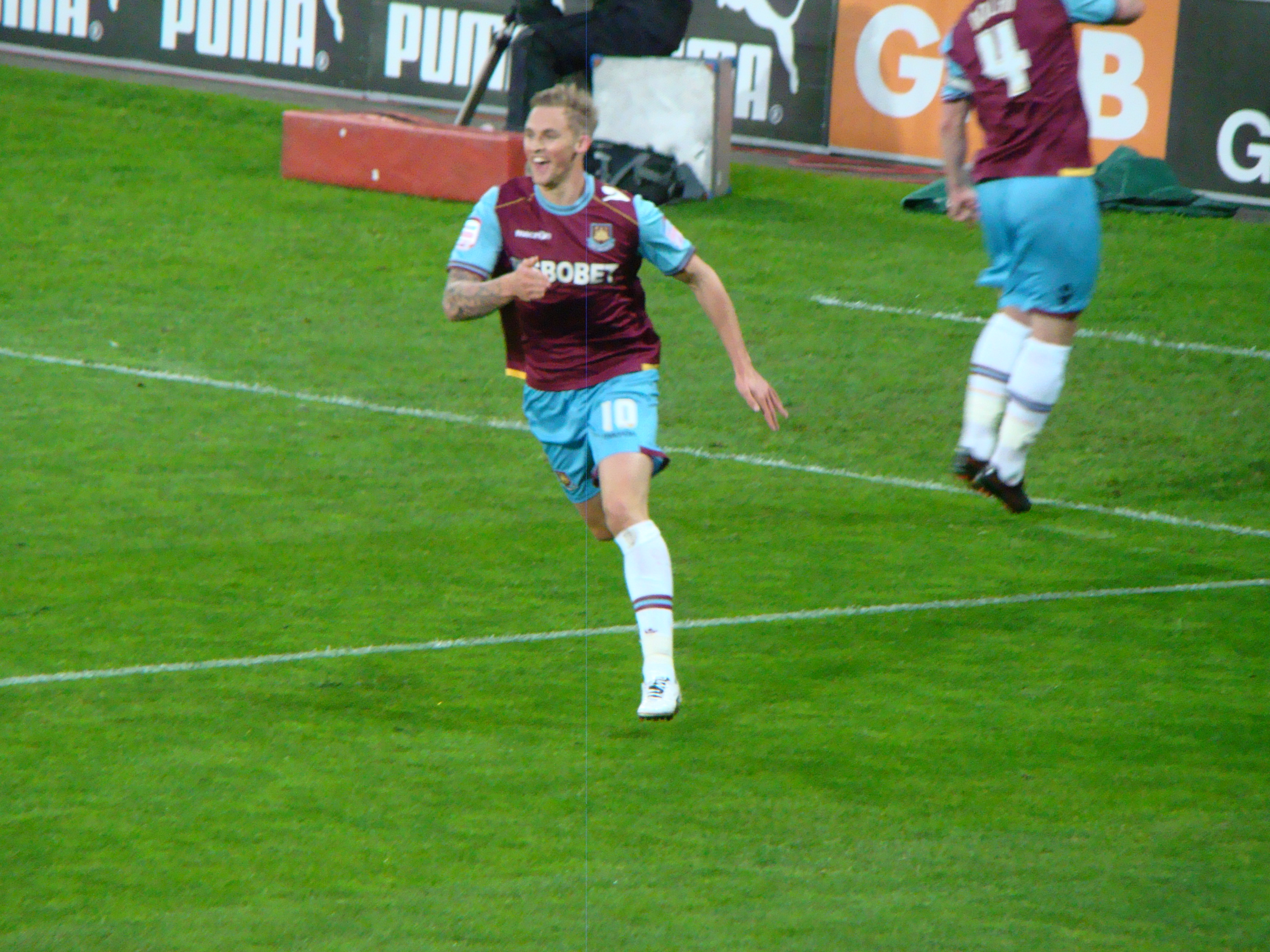
Collison celebrating scoring a goal in May 2012 in a 2–0 win over Cardiff City.

After 14 months out through injury, Collison made his first-team return in a 1–1 draw with Blackburn Rovers on 7 May 2011.

On the opening weekend of the 2011–12 season, Collison came on as a 74th-minute substitute for Mark Noble in a 1–0 defeat at home to Cardiff City. Four days later, Collison committed his future to the football club by signing a new long-term deal with West Ham. On 15 October, Collison scored his first goal of the season in a 4–0 win at home to Blackpool. After just over a month out of the starting lineup, Collison returned in the final away game of the season against Leicester City, with West Ham needing to win to ensure the final automatic promotion place would be determined on the final day of the season. With the score at 1–1, Collison hit a 25-yard shot that beat Kasper Schmeichel giving West Ham the points needed. West Ham finished the season in third-place with 86 points, and would enter the Championship play-offs. On 3 May 2012, Collison scored twice in a 2–0 win away at Cardiff City in the first leg of the play-off semi-final, before West Ham won the second leg 3–0 to advance to final after a 5–0 aggregate scoreline. He also played the full 90 minutes in the play-off final as West Ham defeated Blackpool 2–1 at Wembley Stadium, securing an instant return to the Premier League.

==== Loans ====
Collison signed a one-month loan deal with Championship club AFC Bournemouth on 1 October 2013. He made his debut the same day in a 2–1 defeat away to Leeds United. At the end of October 2013, after playing four games for Bournemouth, Collison returned to West Ham United.

On 18 March 2014, Collison signed for Championship club Wigan Athletic on loan until the end of the season. Having not played for West Ham in the FA Cup during the 2013–14 season, Collison was not cup-tied. He played for Wigan in their semi-final match against Arsenal at Wembley Stadium on 12 April 2014. After the match ended 1–1 after extra time, Arsenal won the penalty shoot-out 4–2, with Collison taking the second Wigan penalty which was saved by Arsenal goalkeeper Lukasz Fabianski. Collison was released by West Ham at the end of the 2013–14 season. He had played 121 games in all competitions for West Ham, scoring 14 goals.

=== Ipswich Town and Peterborough United ===
Collison signed a short-term contract with Championship club Ipswich Town on 26 September 2014 until the end of December. After struggling with injury during his time with Ipswich, by December he had not played for the club and manager, Mick McCarthy, confirmed that Collison's contract would not be renewed.

On 29 May 2015, Collison returned to Peterborough United, signing a one-year contract with the League One club. On 3 August, he was named as Peterborough's under-21 team coach, remaining registered as a player. On 13 February 2016, aged 27, Collison retired from playing following persistent knee injuries, having made 12 appearances for the club.

== International career ==
Collison was eligible to play for Wales through his maternal grandfather and is related to John Gwilliam, a former captain of the Wales rugby union team. Born and brought up in England, Collison chose to play for Wales due to his Welsh ancestry. His then-West Ham teammate and former Wales captain Craig Bellamy had alerted Wales youth coach Brian Flynn about Collison's eligibility. After observing the 19-year-old, Flynn named him in the squad to face Bosnia and Herzegovina under-21 in a UEFA European U-21 Championship qualifier.

=== Under-21 ===
In November 2007, Collison made his debut for the Wales under-21 team in that match and scored in a 4–0 rout. He made further appearances in a 4–2 win over France under-21 on 20 November 2007, and a 4–0 win over Malta under-21 on 5 February 2008, in which he scored Wales' third goal. He was in the squad that narrowly lost to England under-21 in the qualification play-offs and were denied a place in the 2009 UEFA European Under-21 Championship. While in the under-21s, he formed a burgeoning partnership with Aaron Ramsey of Arsenal in central midfield.

=== Senior team ===
Collison made his senior debut for Wales in a friendly win away at Iceland on 29 May 2008. Bellamy praised the young midfielder saying, "I've seen him every afternoon at West Ham and he does extra training. If you want to give this career a good go then you get the rewards and that seems to be how Jack is looking at it." After the death of Collison's father, national team coach John Toshack gave him the choice whether to make himself available for selection. Having played in West Ham's last two games, he declared himself available for the World Cup qualifier against Russia. This match would confirm Collison as a full Wales international, as his previous six caps all came in friendlies. He did not play, however, as he had to attend his father's funeral, which took place on the day of the match. A calf injury ruled Collison out of Wales' remaining World Cup qualifying matches.

With Collison back to full fitness, Toshack named him in the 23-man squad for the 14 November friendly against Scotland. Collison later withdrew from the squad after picking up a knock during the weekend match against Everton. In November, Collison was in the final nomination for the Welsh Young Player of the Year award along with Simon Church and Aaron Ramsey.

On 6 September 2011, Collison made his competitive debut in the Euro 2012 qualifier against England and put to rest further speculation about his future at the international level.

== Managerial career ==
Whilst still only 26 and a player at Peterborough United, Collison was confirmed as manager of their under-21 team whilst completing his coaching badges. Collison began managing the under-18 team in November 2015, and continued in the role after announcing his retirement from his playing career.

On 20 July 2017, it was announced that Collison had returned to West Ham United as under-16 manager. He left the role in June 2019 to coach at MLS team, Atlanta United. He was named head coach of Atlanta United's Reserve team, Atlanta United 2 on June 3, 2021

On 18 January 2023, Collison was announced as the first-ever head coach for MLS Next Pro expansion club Huntsville City, which is the reserve side for Nashville SC.

On 9 April 2024, Huntsville City announced that Collison had parted ways with the club with immediate effect.

== Career statistics ==
=== Club ===
Appearances and goals by club, season and competition
Club	Season	League			FA Cup		League Cup		Other		Total	
Club	Season	Division	Apps	Goals	Apps	Goals	Apps	Goals	Apps	Goals	Apps	Goals
West Ham United	2007–08	Premier League	2	0	0	0	0	0	—		2	0
West Ham United	2008–09	Premier League	20	3	4	0	0	0	—		24	3
West Ham United	2009–10	Premier League	22	2	0	0	1	0	—		23	2
West Ham United	2010–11	Premier League	3	0	0	0	0	0	—		3	0
West Ham United	2011–12	Championship	31	4	1	0	0	0	3 (Note: Appearances in Championship play-offs)	2	35	6
West Ham United	2012–13	Premier League	17	2	2	0	0	0	—		19	2
West Ham United	2013–14	Premier League	10	0	—		5	1	—		15	1
West Ham United	Total		105	11	7	0	6	1	3	2	121	14
AFC Bournemouth (loan)	2013–14	Championship	4	0	—		—		—		4	0
Wigan Athletic (loan)	2013–14	Championship	9	0	1	0	—		—		10	0
Ipswich Town	2014–15	Championship	0	0	0	0	0	0	—		0	0
Peterborough United	2015–16	League One	10	0	0	0	2	0	0	0	12	0
Career total			128	11	8	0	8	1	3	2	147	14

=== International ===
Appearances and goals by national team and year
National team	Year	Apps	Goals
Wales	2008	3	0
Wales	2009	3	0
Wales	2010	1	0
Wales	2011	2	0
Wales	2012	1	0
Wales	2013	4	0
Wales	2014	1	0
Total		15	0

== Managerial statistics ==
As of match played 24 August 2023

Managerial record by team and tenure
Team	From	To	Record								Ref
Team	From	To	G	W	D	L	GF	GA	GD	Win %	Ref
Peterborough United U21	3 August 2015	31 May 2016	1	0	0	1	0	1	−1	0.00	
Peterborough United U18	1 June 2016	30 June 2017	33	9	10	14	47	73	−26	27.27	
West Ham United U18	1 July 2018	30 June 2019	22	9	2	11	43	49	−6	40.91	
Atlanta United Academy	1 August 2019	2 June 2021	17	12	0	5	64	30	+34	70.59	
Atlanta United 2	3 June 2021	16 December 2022	60	12	13	35	76	134	−58	20.00	
Huntsville City FC	18 January 2023	9 April 2024	23	9	5	9	42	34	+8	39.13	
Total			134	42	26	66	231	288	−57	31.34	—

== Honours ==
West Ham United

- Football League Championship play-offs: 2012

Individual

- West Ham United Young Player of the Year: 2008–09
- BBC London Young Footballer of the Year: 2009
