= Hérita Ilunga =

Congolese footballer (born 1982)

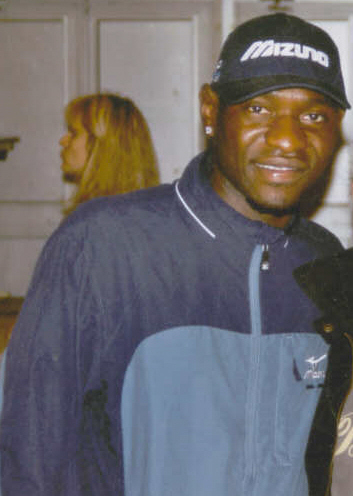
- Ilunga in 2006

Personal information
- Full name: Nkongolo Hérita Ilunga
- Date of birth: 25 February 1982 (age 44)
- Place of birth: Kinshasa, Zaire
- Height: 1.80 m (5 ft 11 in)
- Position: Left-back

Youth career
- 1999–2002: Rennes

Senior career*
Years	Team	Apps	(Gls)
2002–2003	Espanyol B	19	(1)
2003–2007	Saint-Étienne	136	(2)
2007–2009	Toulouse	35	(0)
2008–2009	→ West Ham United (loan)	35	(0)
2009–2012	West Ham United	31	(0)
2011–2012	→ Doncaster Rovers (loan)	15	(0)
2012	Doncaster Rovers	4	(0)
2013	Rennes	5	(0)
2014	Carquefou	10	(0)
2014–2016	Creteil	64	(0)
Total		335	(2)

International career
2004–2011	DR Congo	32	(1)
- * Club domestic league appearances and goals

Nkongolo Hérita Ilunga (born 25 February 1982) is a Congolese former footballer who played as a left-back. At club level, he represented Espanyol B, Saint-Étienne, Toulouse, West Ham United, Doncaster Rovers, Rennes, Carquefou, and US Creteil. He has also played international football for DR Congo.

== Club career ==
=== Early career ===
Aged 13, Ilunga started training with Amiens SC, staying with the Somme-based club for four years before moving to Stade Rennais.

Ilunga moved to Spain, aged 20, where he joined Espanyol. In Barcelona, the left-back featured exclusively for Espanyol's B team in the Spanish Third Division, but he still did enough to catch the eye of Saint-Étienne coach Frederic Antonetti, who took him back to France, initially on loan, in 2003.

Ilunga spent four seasons at the Stade Geoffroy-Guichard, making 135 appearances for Les Verts and winning the club's player of the season award.

=== Toulouse ===
The summer of 2007 saw Ilunga move to Toulouse, who had qualified for the 2007–08 UEFA Champions League. The defender appeared at Anfield as Toulouse lost 5–0 on aggregate to Liverpool at the third qualifying round stage. His time at Toulouse was "horrible" in his first season when the club was 17th place in Ligue 1, avoiding relegation after having a struggling season.

Toulouse dropped into the UEFA Cup, with Ilunga making six appearances as Le Tef beat CSKA Sofia on away goals before falling at the group stage. Toulouse also endured a difficult campaign in Ligue 1, only avoiding relegation on the final day of the season by beating Valenciennes 2–1.

The following season (2008–09), Ilunga seems out of favor with new coach Alain Casanova, the latter preferring Jérémy Mathieu as a left back. After two months without playing a single minute and approaches from different European clubs (including Mallorca and Newcastle), Ilunga was linked interests from English Premier League side West Ham United.

=== West Ham United ===
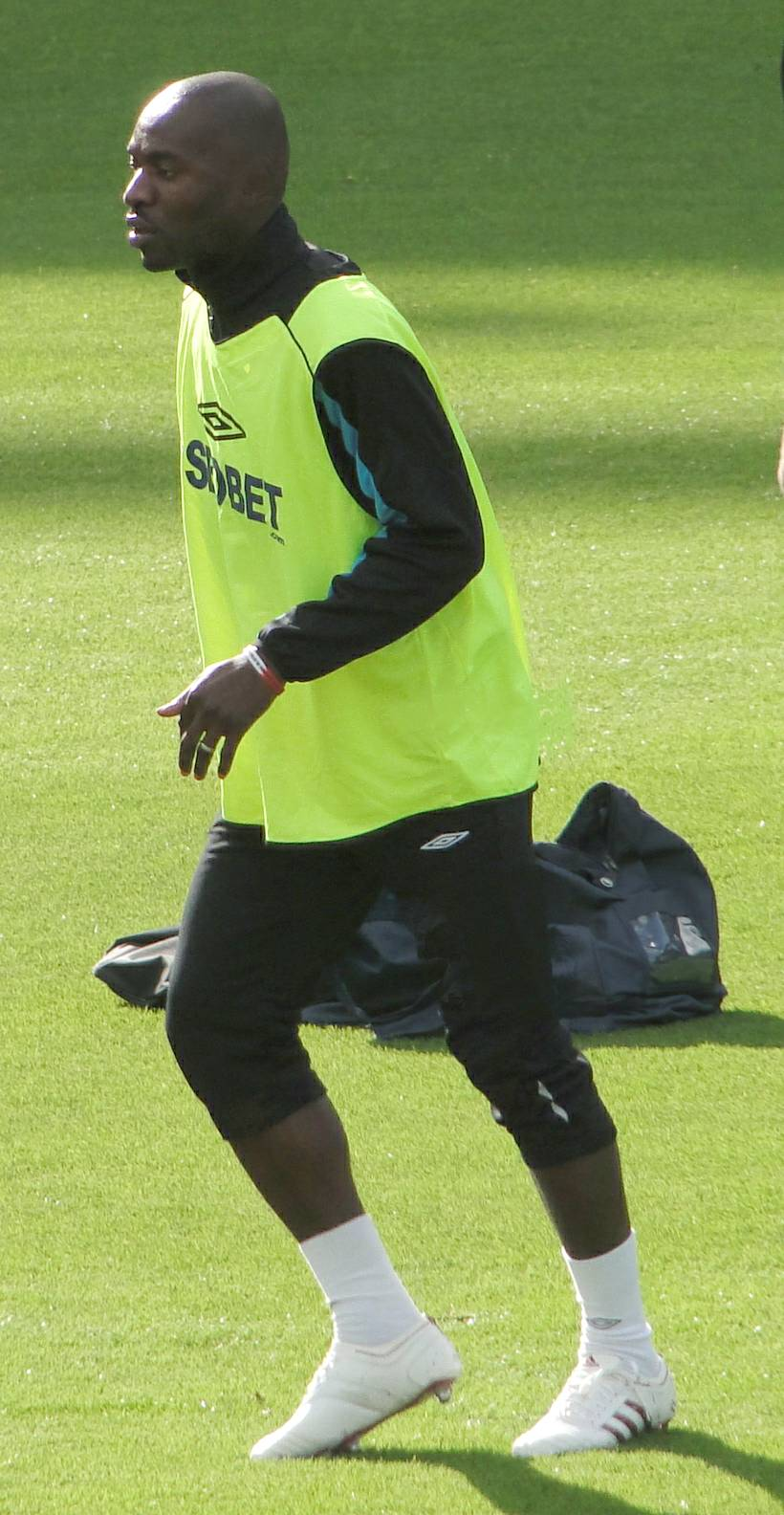
Ilunga warming-up for West Ham United

On 2 September 2008, Premier League club West Ham United signed Ilunga on loan for the 2008–09 season.

Ilunga made his Hammers debut away at West Bromwich Albion on 13 September, and quickly established himself as the club's first-choice left-back, after the sale of George McCartney to Sunderland. Illunga performance led him earned being voted player of the month of October by fans of the Hammers. Ilunga scored his first goal for the club in the 3–0 home FA Cup win against Barnsley on 3 January 2009, and scored again in a later round against Middlesbrough.

On 15 April 2009, Ilunga agreed to turn his loan move into a permanent four-year contract with West Ham. The deal was completed when the 2009 summer transfer window opened. His first game as a permanent signing came in a 2–0 victory over Wolverhampton Wanderers on 15 August 2009 and after a clash of heads between Ilunga and Kevin Foley on 65 minutes, Ilunga and Foley needed treatment. Foley was able to return while Ilunga was substituted for Jonathan Spector. Ilunga suffered a jaw injury not returning until 19 September playing 90 minutes in a 3–2 loss against Liverpool. On 31 October 2009, Ilunga was involved in an incident with Kenwyne Jones. After a foul Jones retaliated by pushing Ilunga in the face; Jones was sent off and received a three match ban and Ilunga was booked. The match finished 2–2. Ilunga made 17 appearances for West Ham during season 2009–10 but only one in the period from January until the end of the season. Injured in a game on 11 February 2010 against Birmingham City, Ilunga did not play again that season.

Ilunga returned on 14 August 2010 in a 3–0 defeat by Aston Villa but found his playing opportunities limited under new manager Avram Grant. He made only 12 appearances during season 2010–11 and by January 2011 he had been omitted from the first team squad. Following West Ham's relegation to the Football Championship and another change of manager, Ilunga was picked for the first five games of season 2011–12 by new manager Sam Allardyce, before leaving to join Doncaster Rovers on-loan.

On 27 January 2012, West Ham United mutually agreed with Ilunga to terminate his contract with immediate effect. He made 73 appearances for West Ham in all competitions scoring three goals.

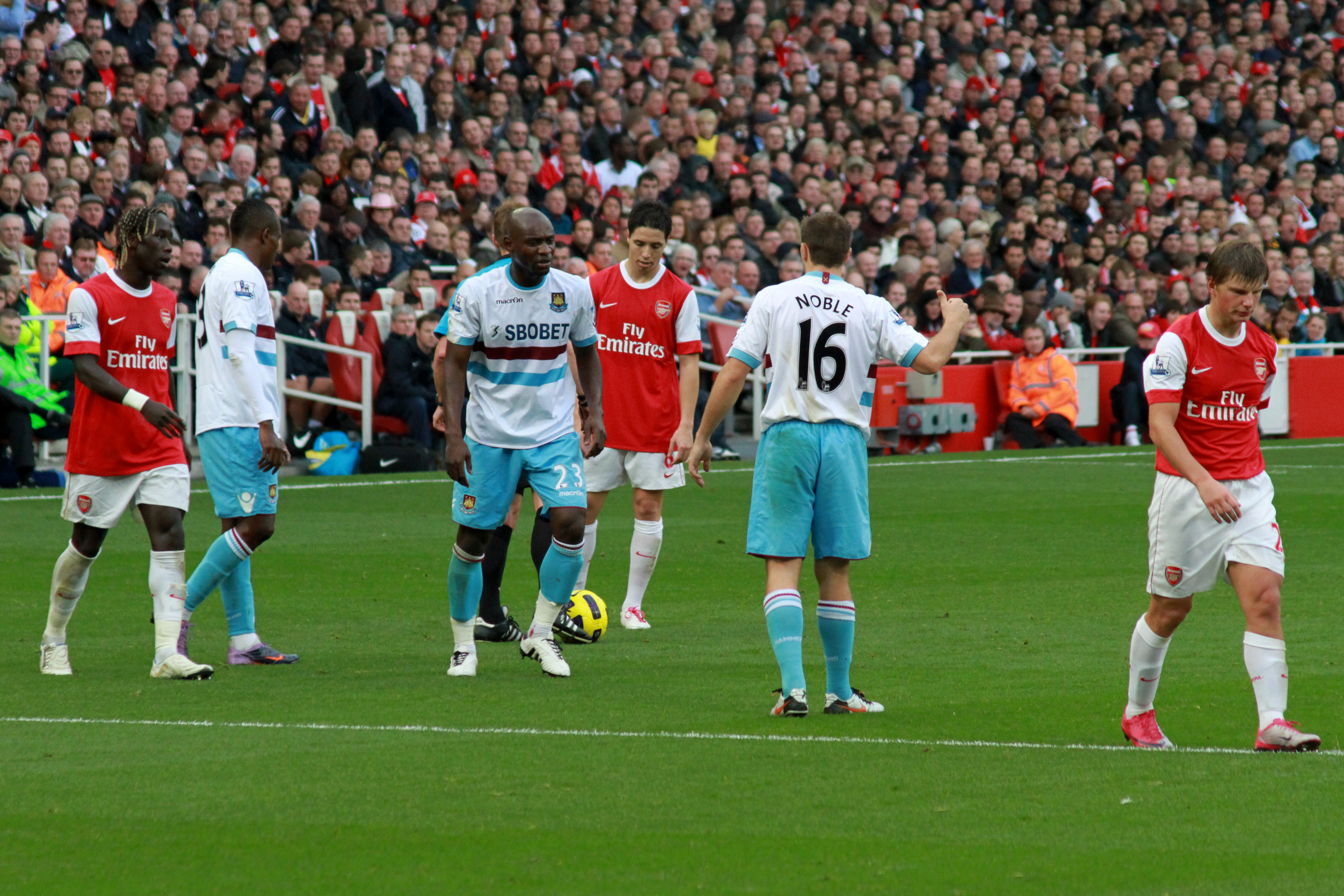
Ilunga (23) as Arsenal's Samir Nasri is about to take a free kick.

=== Doncaster Rovers ===
On 4 October 2011, he joined Doncaster Rovers on a three-month loan. He made his debut on 14 October 2011 in a 3–0 home defeat against Leeds United. On 9 March 2012, Ilunga re-signed for Doncaster on an initial one-month contract but his appearances could not stop Doncaster finishing bottom of the Championship and their relegation to League One. He was not on Doncaster's list of retained players in June 2012 and he left the club.

=== Stade Rennais ===
After being released by Doncaster Rovers, Ilunga made a return to France by going on trial with clubs like Guingamp and Brest in the January transfer window. On 23 January 2013, Illunga signed for Rennes, the team he started his youth career, on a six-month deal and was also reunited with Antonetti, during their time at Saint-Étienne. A few weeks later, Ilunga made his debut (his first appearance in Ligue 1 since 2008), playing in a left-back position, in a 2–2 draw against Lorient. However, Ilunga suffered a thigh injury during a match against Montpellier in March 2013.

=== Later years ===
Following his departure from Rennes, Ilunga went on trial at AS Nancy before spending six months at Carquefou. He then spent two seasons at Creteil. He retired in 2016, and in September 2017 was appointed to the commission for training and development at CAF.

== International career ==
Ilunga was part of the Congolese 2004 African Nations Cup team, who finished bottom of their group in the first round of competition, thus failing to secure qualification for the quarter-finals.

Ilunga helped DR Congo reach the quarter-finals of the African Cup of Nations in Egypt in 2006. The Leopards beat Togo and drew with Angola before being eliminated by the host nation in the last-eight.

Ilunga scored his first goal for his country in a 2010 FIFA World Cup qualifier against Egypt in Cairo on 1 June 2008, but it was not enough to prevent the DR Congo being eliminated from the competition at the second qualifying round stage.

=== International goals ===
#	Date	Venue	Opponent	Score	Result	Competition
1.	1 June 2008	Cairo International Stadium, Cairo	Egypt	1–0	1–2	2010 World Cup qualifier

=== Appearances in major competitions ===
Year	Competition	Category	Appearances		Goals	Team record
Year	Competition	Category	Start	Sub	Goals	Team record
2004–05	2006 FIFA World Cup qualification	Senior	5	0	0	Did not Qualify
2008	2010 FIFA World Cup qualification	Senior	4	0	0	Did not Qualify
