= Philip II of Spain =

King of Spain (1556–1598) and Portugal (1580–1598)

Philip II
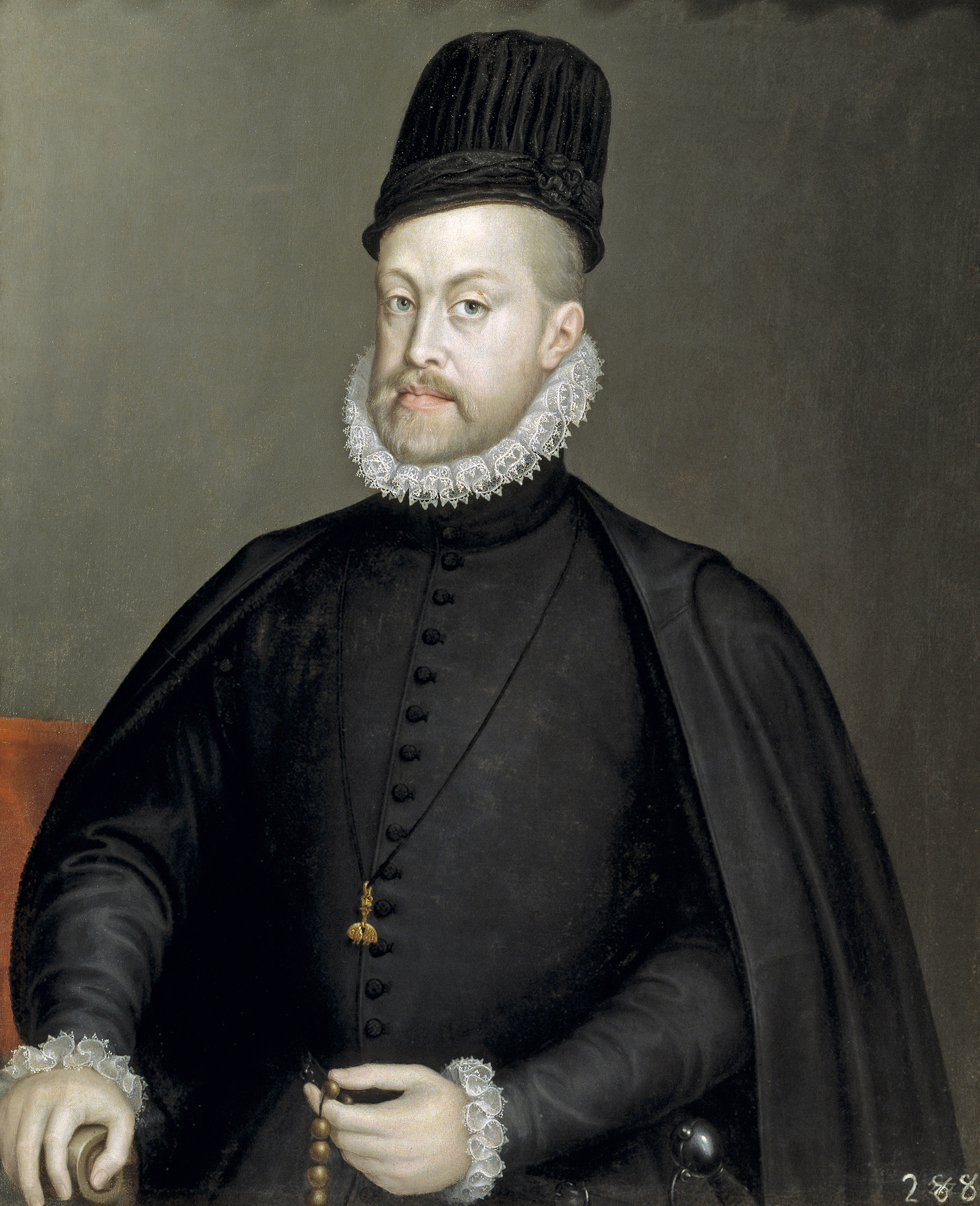
- Portrait by Sofonisba Anguissola, 1565

King of Spain (as Philip II)
- Reign: 16 January 1556 – 13 September 1598
- Predecessor: Charles I
- Successor: Philip III

King of Portugal (as Philip I)
- Reign: 12 September 1580 – 13 September 1598
- Acclamation: 16 April 1581, Tomar
- Predecessor: Henry or Anthony (disputed)
- Successor: Philip III of Spain (as Philip II)

King of England and Ireland (as Philip)
- Reign: 25 July 1554 – 17 November 1558
- Predecessor: Mary I
- Successor: Elizabeth I
- Co-monarch: Mary I

Lord of the Netherlands Duke of Burgundy (as Philip V)
- Reign: 25 October 1555 – 13 September 1598
- Predecessor: Charles II
- Successor: Isabella Clara Eugenia
- Born: 21 May 1527; Palacio de Pimentel, Castile
- Died: 13 September 1598 (aged 71); El Escorial, Castile
- Burial: El Escorial
- Spouses: Maria Manuela of Portugal (m. 1543; died 1545) Mary I of England (m. 1554; died 1558) Elisabeth of Valois (m. 1559; died 1568) Anna of Austria (m. 1570; died 1580)
- Issue more...: Carlos, Prince of Asturias; Isabella Clara Eugenia, Lady of the Netherlands; Catalina Micaela, Duchess of Savoy; Ferdinand, Prince of Asturias; Diego, Prince of Asturias; Philip III of Spain
- House: Habsburg
- Father: Charles V, Holy Roman Emperor
- Mother: Isabella of Portugal

Philip II (Note: He was titled as Philip II (Spanish: Felipe II) in Castile, while in Portugal, Aragon and his Italian kingdoms he ruled as Philip I (Portuguese: Filipe I, Catalan: Felip I).) (21 May 1527 – 13 September 1598), sometimes known in Spain as Philip the Prudent (Spanish: Felipe el Prudente), was King of Spain (Note: Spain was a composite monarchy, and besides being the second Philip to rule Castile, he was the first to rule Aragon, and the fourth to rule Navarre.) from 1556, King of Portugal from 1580, and King of Naples and Sicily from 1554 until his death in 1598. He was also jure uxoris King of England and Ireland from his marriage to Queen Mary I in 1554 until her death in 1558. Further, he was Duke of Milan from 1540. From 1555, he was Lord of the Seventeen Provinces of the Netherlands.

Philip was born and raised in Spain. The son of Emperor Charles V and Isabella of Portugal, he inherited his father's Spanish Empire in 1556, and succeeded to the Portuguese throne in 1580 following a dynastic crisis, forming the Iberian Union. The Spanish conquest of the Inca Empire and of the Philippines, named in his honour by Ruy López de Villalobos, were completed during his reign. He finished building the royal palace El Escorial in 1584. Under Philip II, Spain reached the height of its influence and power, advancing into the Spanish Golden Age, and ruled territories in every continent then known to Europeans. Deeply devout, Philip saw himself as the defender of Catholic Europe against the Ottoman Empire and the Protestant Reformation, and invested Spain's position as the leading European power in multiple simultaneous warring efforts.

During his reign, Spain participated in notable victories against the Ottomans in Oran, Malta and Lepanto. In 1584, during the Eighty Years' War, Philip signed the Treaty of Joinville, funding the French Catholic League over the following decade against the French Huguenots. In 1588, he sent an armada to invade Protestant England, with the strategic aim of overthrowing his former sister-in-law Elizabeth I and re-establishing Catholicism there, but his fleet was repulsed in a skirmish and wrecked by storms as it returned to Spain. He sent additional Armadas in 1596 and 1597, (and his son who succeeded him as Phillip III sent a fourth in 1601), but these similarly failed. Philip's naval power recovered after the defeat of a similarly sized English Armada sent against Spain. As a consequence of these conflicts, Philip led a highly debt-leveraged regime, seeing state defaults in 1557, 1560, 1569, 1575, and 1596. An ambitious plan to extend his conquests to China and across Asia was also considered and abandoned.

Historical reception of Philip II became heavily influenced by enemy propaganda, which he refused to answer or defend himself against, even prohibiting biographical accounts of his life. His negative foreign reputation eventually developed into the Spanish Black Legend. As a result, historian Helmut Koenigsberger would write about Philip, "there has, perhaps, been no personality in modern history, not even Napoleon or Stalin, who has been both as enigmatic and controversial as Philip II of Spain... Neither his own contemporaries nor later historians have been able to agree on his character, his aims or even the degree of success he achieved."

== Early life: 1527–1548 ==
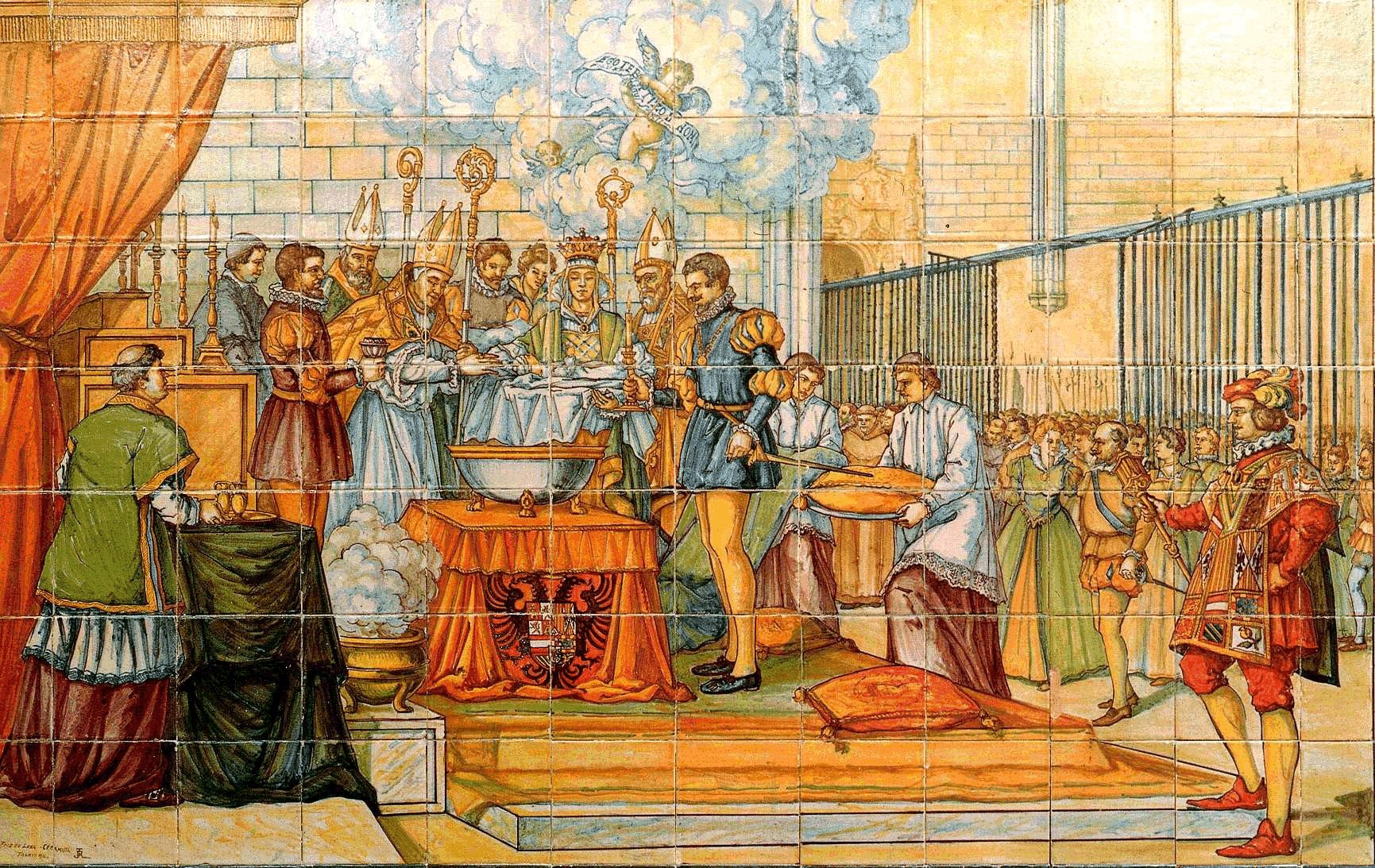
The Baptism of Philip II in Valladolid, Castile. Historical ceiling preserved in Palacio de Pimentel (Valladolid).

A member of the House of Habsburg, Philip was the son of Emperor Charles V, who was also king of Castile and Aragon, and Isabella of Portugal. He was born in the Castilian capital of Valladolid on 21 May 1527 at Palacio de Pimentel, which was owned by Don Bernardino Pimentel (the first Marqués de Távara). The culture and courtly life of Castile were an important influence in his early life. He was entrusted to the royal governess Leonor de Mascareñas, and tutored by Juan Martínez Siliceo, the future archbishop of Toledo. Philip displayed reasonable aptitude in arts and letters alike. He would study with illustrious tutors, including humanists like Silíceo and Juan Cristóbal Calvete de Estrella. Though Philip had good command over Latin, Spanish, and Portuguese, he never managed to equal his father as a polyglot. While Philip was also an archduke of Austria, he was seen as a foreigner in the Holy Roman Empire. The feeling was mutual. Philip felt himself to be culturally Spanish; he had been born in Castile and raised in the Castilian court, his native language was Spanish, and he preferred to live in the Spanish kingdoms. This ultimately impeded his succession to the imperial throne.

In April 1528, when Philip was eleven months old, he received the oath of allegiance as heir to the crown from the Cortes of Castile. From that time until the death of his mother Isabella in 1539, he was raised in the royal court of Castile under the care of his mother and one of her Portuguese ladies, Doña Leonor de Mascarenhas, to whom he was devotedly attached. Philip was also close to his two sisters, María and Juana, and to his two pages, the Portuguese nobleman Rui Gomes da Silva and Luis de Requesens y Zúñiga, the son of his governor. These men would serve Philip throughout their lives, as would Antonio Pérez, his secretary from 1541.

Philip's martial training was undertaken by his governor, Juan de Zúñiga y Requesens, a Castilian nobleman who served as the commendador mayor of Castile. The practical lessons in warfare were overseen by Fernando Álvarez de Toledo, 3rd Duke of Alba during the Italian Wars. Philip was present at the Siege of Perpignan in 1542 but did not see action as the Spanish army under Alba decisively defeated the besieging French forces under the Dauphin of France. On his way back to Castile, Philip received the oath of allegiance of the Aragonese Cortes at Monzón.

His political training had begun a year previously under his father, who had found his son studious, grave, and prudent beyond his years, and having decided to train and initiate him in the government of the Spanish kingdoms. The king-emperor's interactions with his son during his stay in Castile convinced him of Philip's precocity in statesmanship, so he determined to leave in his hands the regency of the Spanish kingdoms in 1543. Philip, who had been made the Duke of Milan in 1540, began governing the most extensive empire in the world at the young age of sixteen.

Charles left Philip with experienced advisors—notably the secretary Francisco de los Cobos and the general, the Duke of Alba. Philip was also left with extensive written instructions that emphasised "piety, patience, modesty, and distrust". These principles of Charles were gradually assimilated by his son, who would grow up to become grave, self-possessed and cautious. Personally, Philip spoke softly and had an icy self-mastery; in the words of one of his ministers, "he had a smile that was cut by a sword".

=== Philip's journey to Brussels (1548–1549) ===
On 1 October 1548, Philip departed Valladolid on his voyage, appointing his sister Maria and her husband Maximilian as regents in his absence. He began a formal journey through Aragon and Catalonia, visiting religious sites such as Zaragoza and Montserrat, and receiving homage in Barcelona and Girona.

In November 1548, Philip travelled with Diego López de Medrano, his first or chief equerry, to Rosas and Genoa aboard the galley belonging to Antonio de Toledo, the senior equerry. Rosas was his point of departure for Italy. At the Bay of Rosas, he was met by Andrea Doria with a fleet of fifty-eight galleys. Florentine obsequies depict his journey in large canvases depicting formative episodes from Philip's youth, including Philip's departure for Brussels from Rosas on the galley, and Philip's reception by the Doge of Genoa in 1548. The admiral, moved by the occasion, knelt before Philip and quoted Simeon: "Now, Lord, let Thy servant depart in peace, for his eyes have seen Thy salvation."

Philip landed at Savona and proceeded to Genoa, where he stayed at the Doria palace and received papal emissary Octavio Farnese, who presented him with a ceremonial sword and cap of state from Pope Paul III. The gesture, despite political tensions, reflected hopes that Philip would serve as a future protector of the Church. Celebrated in Milan, Mantua, and other cities, he continued through the Tyrol and Germany before reaching Brussels to meet Emperor Charles V on 1 April 1549.

== Domestic policy ==
After living in the Netherlands in the early years of his reign, Philip II decided to return to Castile. Although sometimes described as an absolute monarch, Philip faced many constitutional constraints on his authority, influenced by the growing strength of the bureaucracy. The Spanish Empire was not a single monarchy with one legal system but a personal union of separate realms, each jealously guarding its own rights against those of the House of Habsburg. In practice, Philip often found his authority overruled by local assemblies and his word less effective than that of local lords.

Philip carried several titles as heir to the Spanish kingdoms and empire, including Prince of Asturias. The newest constituent kingdom in the empire was Upper Navarre, a realm invaded by Ferdinand II of Aragon mainly with Castilian troops (1512), and annexed to Castile with an ambiguous status (1513). War across Navarre continued until the 1528 (Treaties of Madrid and Cambrai). Charles V proposed to end hostilities with King Henry II of Navarre—the legitimate monarch of Navarre—by marrying his son Philip to the heiress of Navarre, Jeanne III of Navarre. The marriage would provide a dynastic solution to instability in Navarre, making him king of all Navarre (Upper and Lower) and a prince of the independent Béarn, as well as lord of part of southwestern France. However, the French nobility under Francis I opposed the arrangement and successfully ended the prospects of marriage between the heirs of Habsburg and Albret in 1541.

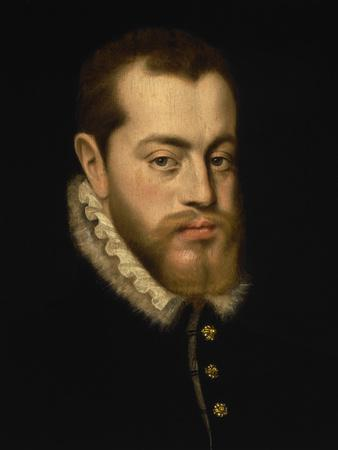
Philip, in the prime of his life, by Anthonis Mor

In his will, Charles stated his doubts over Navarre and recommended that his son give the kingdom back. Both King Charles and his son Philip II failed to abide by the elective (contractual) nature of the Crown of Navarre and took the kingdom for granted. This sparked mounting tension not only with King Henry II and Queen Jeanne III of Navarre but also with the Parliament of the Spanish Navarre (Cortes, The Three States) and the Diputación for breach of the realm specific laws (fueros)—violation of the pactum subjection is as ratified by Ferdinand. Tensions in Navarre came to a head in 1592 after several years of disagreements over the agenda of the intended parliamentary session.

In November 1592, the Parliament (Cortes) of Aragón revolted against another breach of the realm-specific laws, so the Attorney General (Justicia) of the kingdom, Juan de Lanuza, was executed on Philip II's orders, with his secretary Antonio Pérez taking exile in France. In Navarre, the major strongholds of the kingdom were garrisoned by troops alien to the kingdom (Castilians) in a conspicuous violation of the local laws, and the Parliament had long been refusing to pledge loyalty to Philip II's son and heir apparent without a proper ceremony. On 20 November 1592 a ghostly Parliament session was called, pushed by Philip II, who had arrived in Pamplona at the head of an unspecified military force, and with only one point on his agenda—attendance to the session was kept blank on the minutes: unlawful appointments of trusted Castilian officials and imposition of his son as the future king of Navarre at the Santa Maria Cathedral. A ceremony was held before the bishop of Pamplona (22 November), but its customary procedure and terms were altered. Protests erupted in Pamplona, but they were quelled.

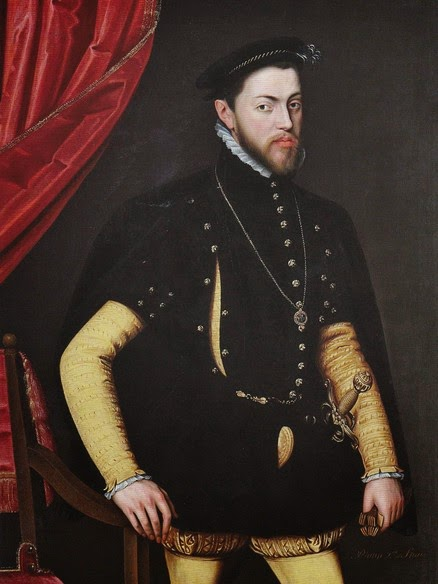
Philip II wearing the Order of the Garter by Jooris van der Straeten, c. 1554

Philip II also grappled with the problem of the large Morisco population in the Spanish kingdoms, who had been forcibly converted to Christianity by his predecessors. In 1569, the Morisco Revolt broke out in the southern Kingdom of Granada in defiance of attempts to suppress Moorish customs. Philip ordered the expulsion of the Moriscos from Granada and their dispersal to other provinces.

Despite its immense dominions, the Spanish kingdoms had a sparse population that yielded a limited income to the crown (in contrast to France, for example, which was much more heavily populated). Philip faced major difficulties in raising taxes, and the collection was largely farmed out to local lords. He was able to finance his military campaigns only by taxing and exploiting the local resources of his empire. The flow of income from the New World proved vital to his militant foreign policy, but his exchequer several times faced bankruptcy.

Spanish culture flourished during Philip's reign, beginning the "Spanish Golden Age", creating a lasting legacy in literature, music, and the visual arts. One of the notable artists from Philip II's court was Sofonisba Anguissola, who gained fame for her talent and unusual role as a woman artist.

== Economy ==
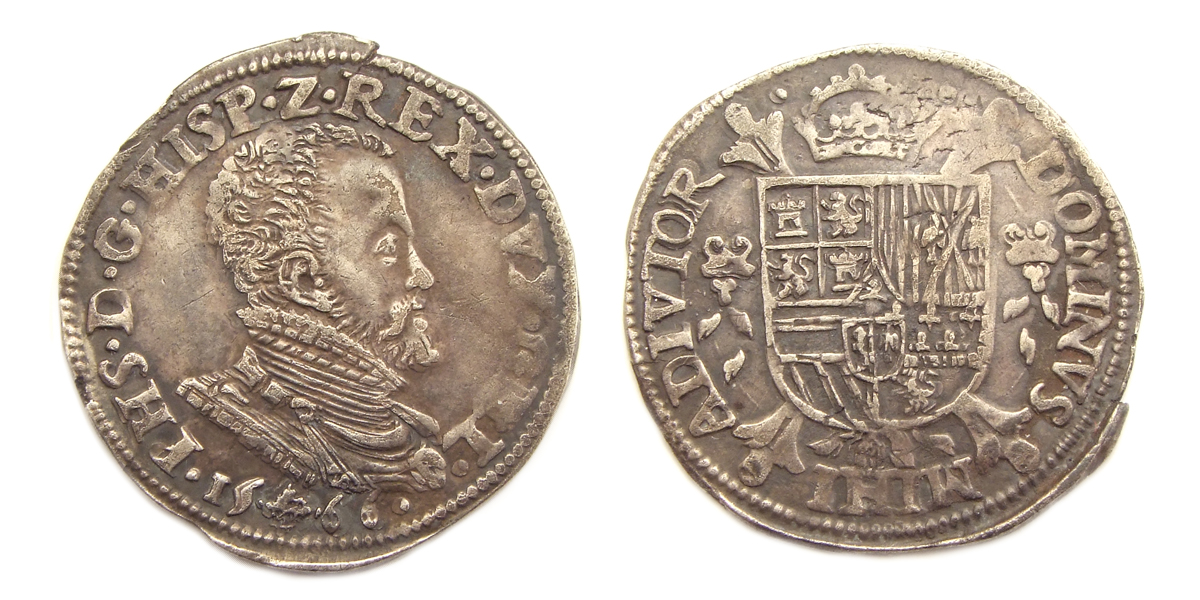
Portrait of Philip II on 1/5 Philipsdaalder, struck 1566, Guelders, Low Countries

Charles V had left his son Philip with a debt of about 36 million ducats and an annual deficit of 1 million ducats. This debt caused Philip II to default on loans in 1557, 1560, 1575, and 1596 (including debt to Poland, known as Neapolitan sums). Lenders had no power over the King and could not force him to repay his loans. These defaults were just the beginning of Spain's economic troubles as its kings would default six more times in the next 65 years. Aside from reducing state revenues for overseas expeditions, the domestic policies of Philip II further burdened the Spanish kingdoms and would, in the following century, contribute to its decline, as maintained by some historians.

The Spanish kingdoms were subject to different assemblies: the Cortes in Castile, the assembly in Navarre, and one each for the four kingdoms of Aragon, which preserved traditional rights and laws from the time when they were separate kingdoms. This made the Spanish kingdoms and its possessions difficult to rule, unlike France, which while divided into regional states, had a single Estates General. The lack of a viable supreme assembly led to power defaulting into Philip II's hands, especially as manager and final arbiter of the constant conflict between different authorities. To deal with the difficulties arising from this situation, authority was administered by local agents appointed by the crown and viceroys carrying out crown instructions. Philip II felt it necessary to be involved in the detail, and he presided over specialised councils for state affairs, finance, war, and the Inquisition.

Philip II played groups against each other, leading to a system of checks and balances that managed affairs inefficiently, even to the extent of damaging state business, as in the Perez affair. Following a fire in Valladolid in 1561, he resisted calls to move his Court to Lisbon, an act that could have curbed centralisation and bureaucracy domestically as well as relaxed rule in the Empire as a whole. Instead, with the traditional Royal and Primacy seat of Toledo now essentially obsolete, he moved his Court to the Castilian stronghold of Madrid. Except for a brief period under Philip III of Spain, Madrid has remained the capital of Spain. It was around this time that Philip II converted the Royal Alcázar of Madrid into a royal palace; the works, which lasted from 1561 until 1598, were done by tradesmen who came from the Netherlands, Italy, and France.

King Philip II ruled at a critical turning point in European history toward modernity whereas his father Charles V had been forced to an itinerant rule as a medieval king. He mainly directed state affairs, even when not at Court. Indeed, when his health began failing, he worked from his quarters at the Palace-Monastery-Pantheon of El Escorial that he had built in 1584, a palace built as a monument to Spain's role as a centre of the Christian world. But Philip did not enjoy the supremacy that King Louis XIV of France would in the next century, nor was such a rule necessarily possible at his time. The inefficiencies of the Spanish state and the restrictively regulated industry under his rule were common to many contemporary countries.

== Foreign policy ==
Philip's foreign policies were determined by a combination of Catholic fervour and dynastic objectives. He considered himself the chief defender of Catholic Europe, both against the Ottoman Empire and against the forces of the Protestant Reformation. He never relented from his fight against heresy, defending the Catholic faith and limiting freedom of worship within his territories. These territories included his patrimony in the Netherlands, where Protestantism had taken deep root. Following the Revolt of the Netherlands in 1568, Philip waged a campaign against Dutch heresy and secession. It also dragged in the English and the French at times and expanded into the German Rhineland with the Cologne War. This series of conflicts lasted for the rest of his life. Philip's constant involvement and focus in European wars took a significant toll on the treasury and caused economic difficulties for the Crown and even bankruptcies.

Personal guidon of Philip II

In 1588, the English defeated Philip's Spanish Armada, thwarting his planned invasion of the country to reinstate Catholicism, while he in turn defeated the English Armada sent in 1589 to capitalize on the chance. But war with England continued for the next sixteen years, in a complex series of struggles that included France, Ireland and the main battle zone, the Low Countries. It would not end until all the leading protagonists, including himself, had died. Earlier, however, after several setbacks in his reign and especially that of his father, Philip did achieve a decisive victory against the Turks at Lepanto in 1571, with the allied fleet of the Holy League, which he had put under the command of his illegitimate brother, John of Austria. He also successfully secured his succession to the throne of Portugal.

The administration of overseas conquests was reformed. Extensive questionnaires were distributed to every major town and region in New Spain called relaciones geográficas. These surveys helped the Spanish monarchy to govern Philip's overseas possessions more effectively.

=== Italy ===
Charles V abdicated the throne of Naples to Philip on 25 July 1554, and the young king was invested with the kingdom (officially a Papal fief) on 2 October by Pope Julius III. The date of Charles' abdication of the throne of Sicily is uncertain, but Philip was invested with this kingdom on 18 November 1554 by Julius. In 1556, Philip decided to invade the Papal States and temporarily held territory there, perhaps in response to Pope Paul IV's anti-Spanish outlook. According to Philip II, he was doing it for the benefit of the Church.

In a letter to the Princess Dowager of Portugal, Regent of the Spanish kingdoms, dated 22 September 1556, Francisco de Vargas wrote:

I have reported to your Highness what has been happening here, and how far the Pope is going in his fury and vain imaginings. His Majesty could not do otherwise than have a care for his reputation and dominions. I am sure your Highness will have had more recent news from the Duke of Alva, who has taken the field with an excellent army and has penetrated so far into the Pope's territory that his cavalry is raiding up to ten miles from Rome, where there is such panic that the population would have run away had not the gates been closed. The Pope has fallen ill with rage, and was struggling with a fever on the 16th of this month. The two Carafa brothers, the Cardinal and Count Montorio, do not agree, and they and Piero Strozzi are not on as good terms as they were in the past. They would like to discuss peace. The best thing would be for the Pope to die, for he is the poison at the root of all this trouble and more which may occur. His Majesty's intention is only to wrest the knife from this madman's hand and make him return to a sense of his dignity, acting like the protector of the Apostolic See, in whose name, and that of the College of Cardinals, his Majesty has publicly proclaimed that he has seized all he is occupying. The Pope is now sending again to the potentates of Italy for help. I hope he will gain as little thereby as he has done in the past, and that the French will calm down. May God give us peace in the end, as their Majesties desire and deserve!

In response to the invasion, Pope Paul IV called for a French military intervention. After minor fights in Lazio and near Rome, Fernando Álvarez de Toledo, 3rd Duke of Alba, Viceroy of Naples met Cardinal Carlo Carafa and signed the Treaty of Cave as a compromise: French and Spanish forces left the Papal States and the Pope declared a neutral position between France and the Spanish kingdoms.

Philip led the Spanish kingdoms into the final phase of the Italian Wars. A Spanish advance into France from the Low Countries led to their important victory at the Battle of St. Quentin (1557). The French were defeated again at the Battle of Gravelines (1558). The resulting Treaty of Cateau-Cambrésis in 1559 secured Piedmont to the Duchy of Savoy, and Corsica to the Republic of Genoa. Both Genoa and Savoy were allies of Spain and, although Savoy subsequently declared its neutrality between France and Spain, Genoa remained a crucial financial ally for Philip during his entire reign. The treaty also confirmed Philip's control over Milan, Naples, Sicily, and Sardinia. Therefore, all of southern Italy was under Spanish rule as part of the Crown of Aragon. In the north, Milan was a duchy of the Holy Roman Empire held by Philip. Attached to the Kingdom of Naples, the State of Presidi in Tuscany gave Philip the possibility to monitor maritime traffic to southern Italy, whilst the grant of the Duchy of Siena to the new Grand Duchy of Tuscany, ensured it would remain a Spanish ally. The Council of Italy was set up by Philip in order to co-ordinate his rule over the states of Milan, Naples and Sicily. Ultimately, the treaty ended the 60-year Franco-Habsburg wars for supremacy in Italy. It marked also the beginning of a period of peace between the Pope and Philip, as their European interests converged, although political differences remained and diplomatic contrasts eventually re-emerged.

By the end of the wars in 1559, Habsburg Spain had been established as the premier power of Europe, to the detriment of France. In France, Henry II was fatally wounded in a joust held during the celebrations of the peace. His death led to the accession of his 15-year-old son Francis II, who in turn soon died. The French monarchy was thrown into turmoil, which increased further with the outbreak of the French Wars of Religion that would last for several decades. The states of Italy were reduced to second-rate powers, with Spain dominating the peninsula. Mary Tudor's death in 1558 enabled Philip to seal the treaty by marrying Henry II's daughter, Elisabeth of Valois, later giving him a claim to the throne of France on behalf of his daughter by Elisabeth, Isabella Clara Eugenia.

=== France ===
The French Wars of Religion (1562–1598) were primarily fought between French Catholics and Protestants (Huguenots). The conflict involved the factional disputes between the aristocratic houses of France, such as the House of Bourbon and House of Guise, and both sides received assistance from foreign sources. Philip claimed descent from Constantine I and Charlemagne, justifying his intervention in French Wars of Religion and his continuing efforts to depose Henry IV of France.

Philip signed the Treaty of Vaucelles with Henry II of France in 1556. Based on the terms of the treaty, the territory of Franche-Comté in Burgundy was to be relinquished to Philip. However, the treaty was broken shortly afterwards. France and the Spanish kingdoms waged war in northern France and Italy over the following years. Spanish victories at St. Quentin and Gravelines led to the Treaty of Cateau-Cambrésis, in which France recognised Spanish sovereignty over Franche-Comté.

During the War of the Portuguese Succession, the pretender António fled to France following his defeats and, as Philip's armies had not yet occupied the Azores, he sailed there with a large Anglo-French fleet under Filippo Strozzi, a Florentine exile in the service of France. The naval Battle of Terceira took place on 26 July 1582, in the sea near the Azores, off São Miguel Island, as part of the War of the Portuguese Succession and the Anglo-Spanish War (1585–1604). The Spanish navy defeated the combined Anglo-French fleet that had sailed to preserve control of the Azores under António. The French naval contingent was the largest French force sent overseas before the age of Louis XIV.

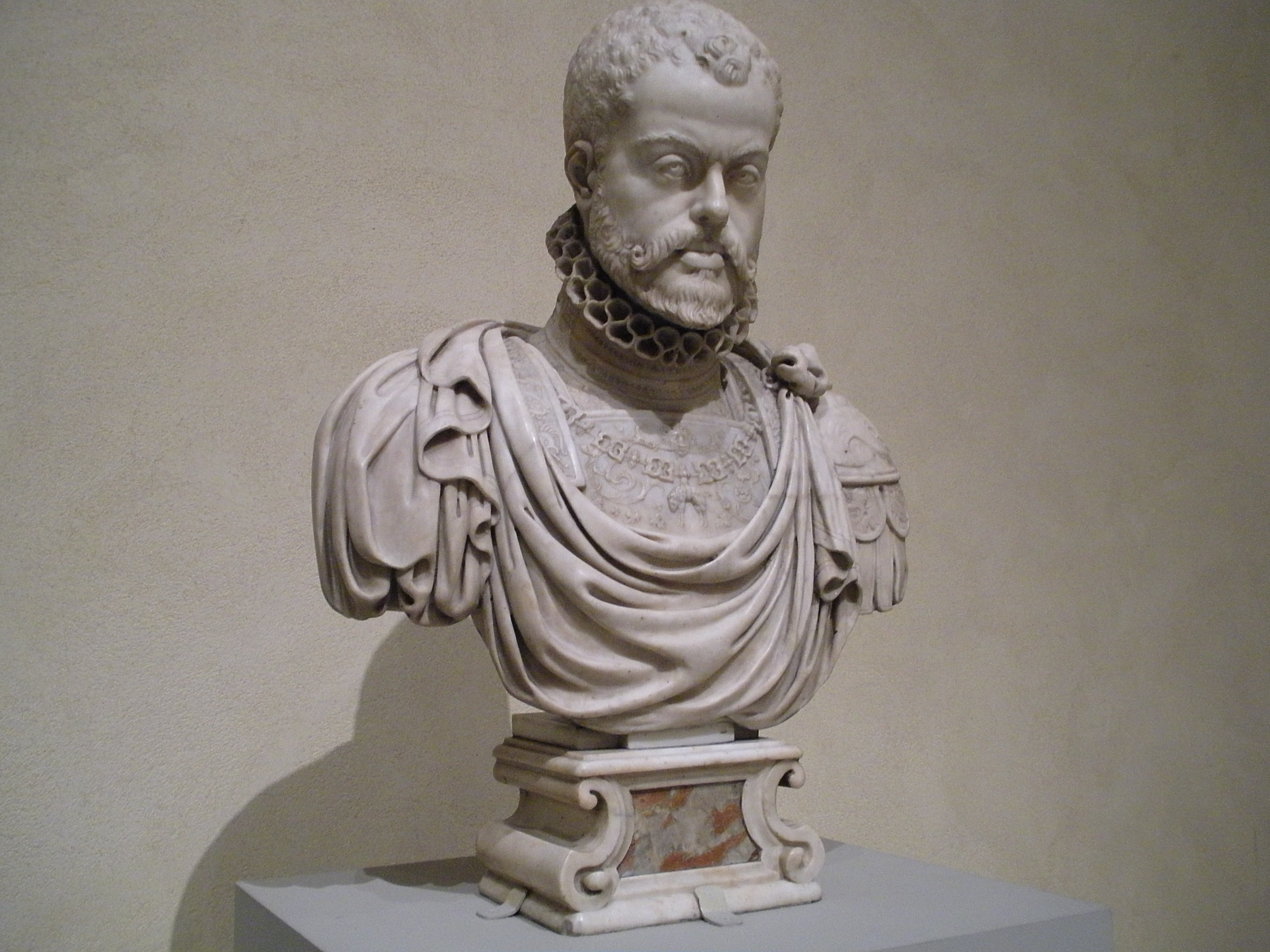
A marble bust of Philip II of Spain by Pompeo Leoni, Metropolitan Museum of Art

The Spanish victory at Terceira was followed by the Battle of the Azores between the Portuguese loyal to the claimant António, supported by French and English troops, and the Spanish-Portuguese forces loyal to Philip commanded by the admiral Don Álvaro de Bazán. Victory in Azores completed the incorporation of Portugal into the Spanish Empire.

Philip financed the Catholic League during the French Wars of Religion, obtaining the support of the Duke of Guise. In 1588, Guise proposed Philip to proclaim him emperor of France with the support of Cardinal Bourbon, which would hopefully land Guise in the royal throne, but Philip declined the title, unwilling to invest heavily in French politics at the time.

However, he directly intervened in the final phases of the wars (1589–1598), ordering Alexander Farnese, Duke of Parma into France in an effort to unseat Henry IV, dreaming of placing his favourite daughter, Isabella Clara Eugenia, on the French throne. Elisabeth of Valois, Philip's third wife and Isabella's mother, had already ceded any claim to the French Crown with her marriage to Philip and in France the Salic law remained in effect. However, the Parlement of Paris, in power of the Catholic party, gave verdict that Isabella Clara Eugenia was "the legitimate sovereign" of France. Philip's interventions in the fighting—sending the Duke of Parma to end Henry IV's siege of Paris in 1590 and the siege of Rouen in 1592—contributed in saving the French Catholic Leagues's cause against a Protestant monarchy.

In 1593, Henry agreed to convert to Catholicism; weary of war, most French Catholics switched to his side against the hardline core of the Catholic League, who were portrayed by Henry's propagandists as puppets of a foreign monarch, Philip. By the end of 1594 certain League members were still working against Henry across the country, but all relied on the support of the Spanish Crown. In January 1595, therefore, Henry officially declared war on the Spanish Crown, to show Catholics that Philip was using religion as a cover for an attack on the French state, and Protestants that he had not become a puppet of the Spanish Crown through his conversion, while hoping to reconquer large parts of northern France from the Franco-Spanish Catholic forces.

French victory at the Battle of Fontaine-Française in Burgundy, 5 June 1595, marked an end to the Catholic League in France. The French also made some progress during an invasion of the Spanish Netherlands. They captured Ham and massacred the small Spanish garrison, provoking anger among the Spanish ranks. The Spanish launched a concerted offensive that year, taking Doullens, Cambrai, and Le Catelet; at Doullens, they massacred 4,000 of its citizens. On 24 April 1596, the Spanish also conquered Calais. Following the Spanish capture of Amiens in March 1597, the French Crown laid siege to it until it managed to reconquer Amiens from the overstretched Spanish forces in September 1597. Henry then negotiated a peace with the Spanish Crown. The war was only drawn to an official close, however, with the Peace of Vervins in May 1598.

The 1598 Treaty of Vervins was largely a restatement of the 1559 Peace of Câteau-Cambrésis and Spanish forces and subsidies were withdrawn; meanwhile, Henry issued the Edict of Nantes, which offered a high degree of religious toleration for French Protestants. The military interventions in France thus failed to oust Henry from the throne or suppress Protestantism in France, and yet they had played a decisive part in helping the French Catholic cause gain the conversion of Henry, ensuring that Catholicism would remain France's official and majority faith—matters of paramount importance for the devoutly Catholic Spanish king.

=== Mediterranean ===
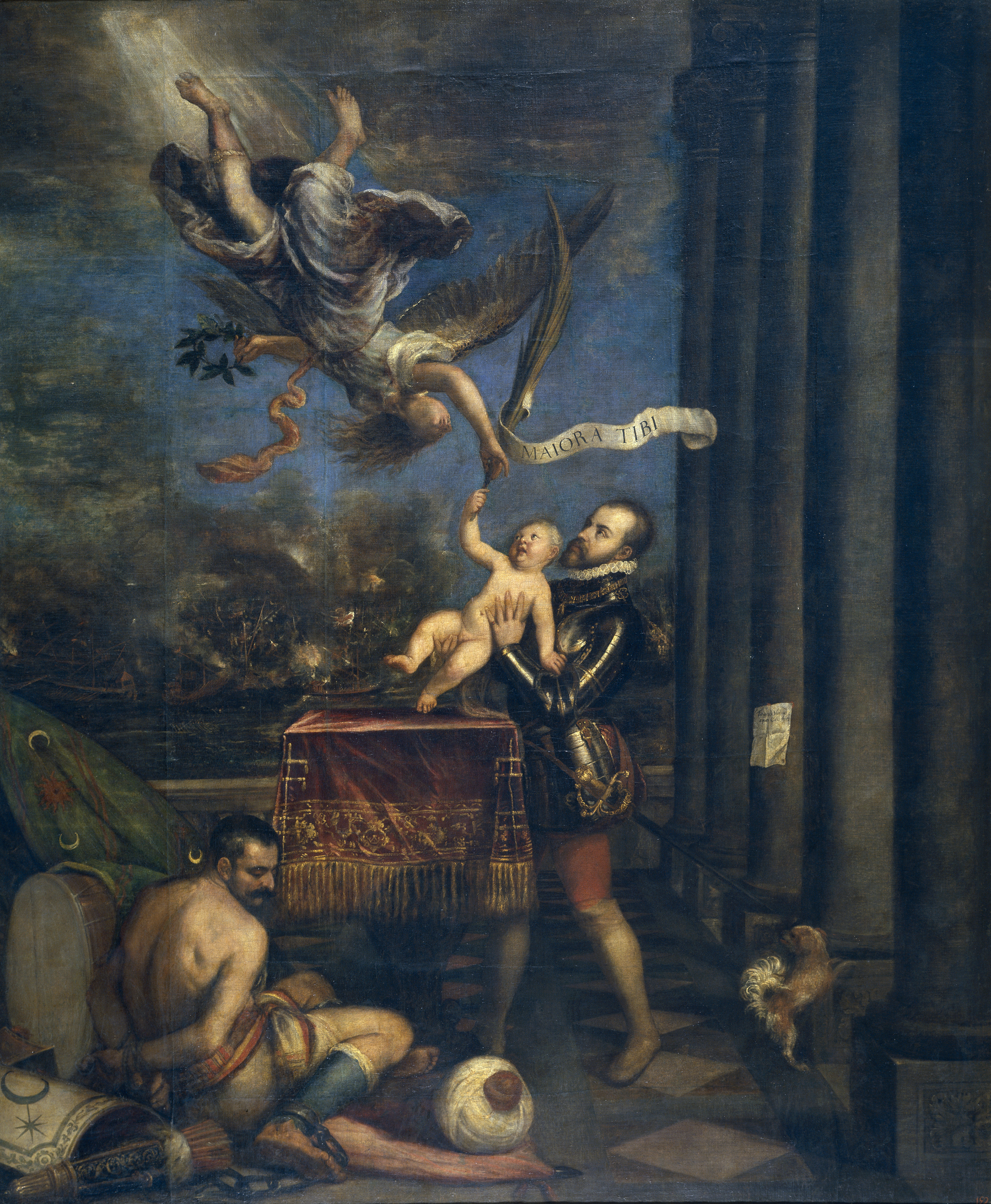
Titian; after the Battle of Lepanto in 1571, Philip offers his short-lived heir Fernando to Glory in this allegory.

Standard of the tercios morados of the Spanish army under Philip II

In the early part of his reign Philip was concerned with the rising power of the Ottoman Empire under Suleiman the Magnificent. Fear of Islamic domination in the Mediterranean caused him to pursue an aggressive foreign policy.

In 1558, Turkish admiral Piyale Pasha captured the Balearic Islands, especially inflicting great damage on Menorca and enslaving many, while raiding the coasts of the Spanish mainland. Philip appealed to the Pope and other powers in Europe to bring an end to the rising Ottoman threat. Since his father's losses against the Ottomans and against Hayreddin Barbarossa in 1541, the major European sea powers in the Mediterranean, namely the Spanish Crown and Venice, became hesitant in confronting the Ottomans. The myth of "Turkish invincibility" was becoming a popular story, causing fear and panic among the people.

In 1560, Philip II organised a Holy League between the Spanish kingdoms and the Republic of Venice, the Republic of Genoa, the Papal States, the Duchy of Savoy and the Knights of Malta. The joint fleet was assembled at Messina and consisted of 200 ships (60 galleys and 140 other vessels) carrying a total of 30,000 soldiers under the command of Giovanni Andrea Doria, nephew of the famous Genoese admiral Andrea Doria.

On 12 March 1560, the Holy League captured the island of Djerba, which had a strategic location and could control the sea routes between Algiers and Tripoli. As a response, Suleiman sent an Ottoman fleet of 120 ships under the command of Piyale Pasha, which arrived at Djerba on 9 May 1560. The battle lasted until 14 May 1560, and the forces of Piyale Pasha and Turgut Reis (who joined Piyale Pasha on the third day of the battle) won an overwhelming victory at the Battle of Djerba. The Holy League lost 60 ships (30 galleys) and 20,000 men, and Giovanni Andrea Doria was barely able to escape with a small vessel. The Ottomans retook the Fortress of Djerba, whose Spanish commander, D. Álvaro de Sande, attempted to escape with a ship but was followed and eventually captured by Turgut Reis.

In 1563, capitalizing on the political climate, the Regency of Algiers launched the sieges of Oran and Mers El Kébir in a large scale attempt to dislodge the major Spanish positions in Northern Africa, but the attempt met failure. Philip's rebuilt navy then conquered Peñón de Vélez de la Gomera the following year. The Ottomans sent a large expedition to Malta, which laid siege to several forts on the island and took some of them, but the Spanish sent a relief force under D. García de Toledo and a rescued Álvaro de Sande, which finally drove the Ottoman army out of the island.

The grave threat posed by the increasing Ottoman domination of the Mediterranean was finally reversed in one of history's most decisive battles, with the destruction of nearly the entire Ottoman fleet at the Battle of Lepanto in 1571, by the Holy League under the command of Philip's half brother, Don John of Austria, and Don Álvaro de Bazán. The battle was followed by the skirmish at Cerigo Channel, where John of Austria's lieutenant Marcantonio Colonna put the rebuilt Ottoman fleet to flight. However, the Holy League would disband shortly after.

A fleet sent by Philip, again commanded by Don John, reconquered Tunis from the Ottomans in 1573. The Turks soon rebuilt their fleet, and in 1574 Uluç Ali Reis managed to recapture Tunis with a force of 250 galleys and a siege that lasted 40 days, with thousands of Spanish and Italian soldiers became prisoners. Nevertheless, Lepanto marked a permanent reversal in the balance of naval power in the Mediterranean and the end of the threat of Ottoman control. In 1585 a peace treaty was signed with the Ottomans.

=== Strait of Magellan ===
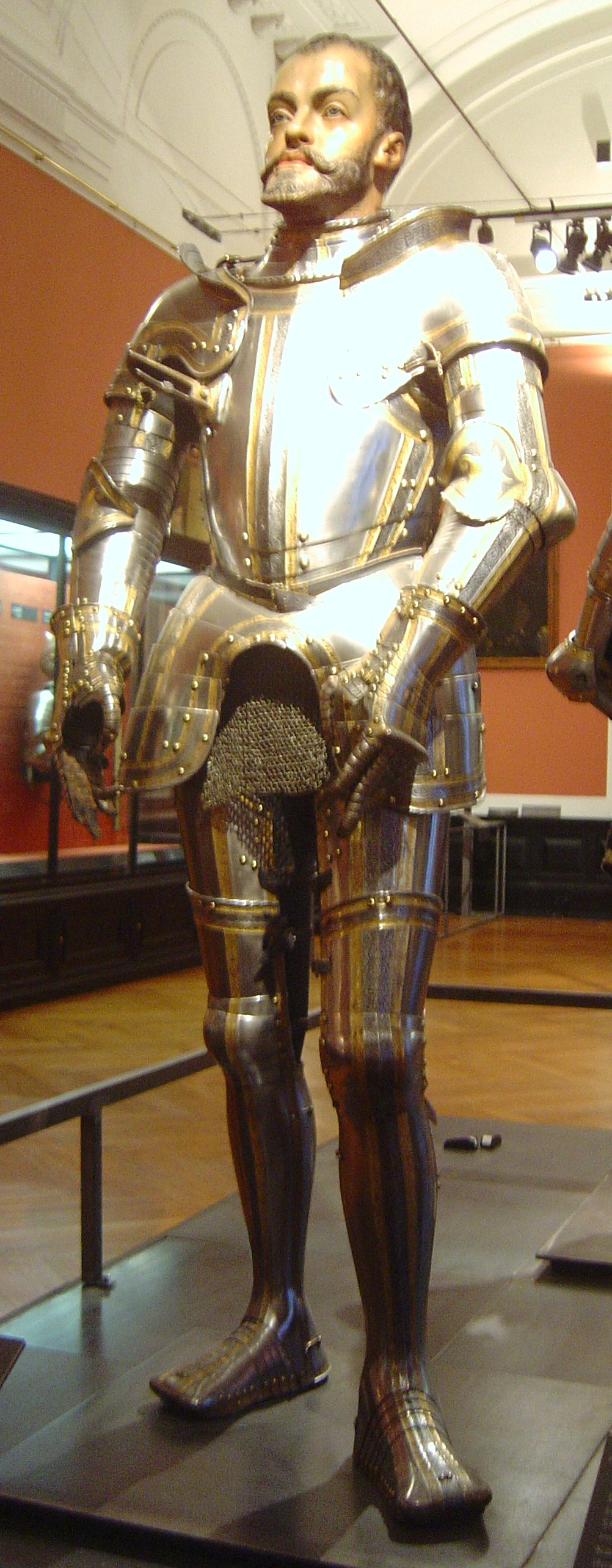
Armour of Philip II

During Philip's reign Spain considered the Pacific Ocean a mare clausum—a sea closed to other naval powers— as the only known entrance from the Atlantic, the Strait of Magellan was at times patrolled by fleets sent to prevent entrance of non-Spanish ships.

To end navigation by rival powers in the Strait of Magellan Spanish viceroy Francisco de Toledo ordered Pedro Sarmiento de Gamboa to explore the strait and found settlements on its shores.

In 1584, Pedro Sarmiento de Gamboa founded two colonies in the strait: Nombre de Jesús, and Ciudad del Rey Don Felipe. The latter was established north of the strait with 300 settlers. The new colonies suffered from high death rates, likely as a consequence of executions, brawls, violent encounters with indigenous peoples and diseases which were rife. A contributing cause for failure of the settlement may have been poor morale, an issue that plagued the venture almost from the beginning. This can in part be explained by a series of difficulties the expedition had to go through between the departure from Spain and the arrival to the strait. Philip II's inaction despite repeated pleas by Sarmiento to aid the ailing colony has been attributed to the strain on Spain's resources that resulted from wars with England and Dutch rebels.

In 1587, English corsairs renamed Ciudad del Rey Don Felipe, Puerto del Hambre, or "Port Famine". Most of the settlers had died from cold or starvation. When Sir Thomas Cavendish landed at the site of Rey Don Felipe in 1587, he found only ruins of the settlement. The Spanish failure at colonizing the Strait of Magellan caused Chiloé Archipelago to assume the role of protecting western Patagonia from foreign intrusions. Valdivia and Chiloé acted as sentries, being hubs where the Spanish collected intelligence from all over Patagonia.

=== Revolt in the Netherlands ===
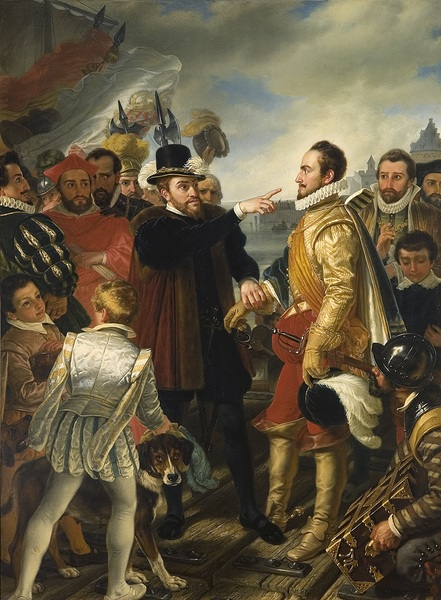
Philip II berating William of Orange, by Cornelis Kruseman

Philip's rule in the Seventeen Provinces known collectively as the Netherlands faced many difficulties, leading to open warfare in 1568. He appointed his half-sister Margaret of Parma as Governor of the Netherlands, when he left the low countries for the Spanish kingdoms in 1559, but forced her to adjust policy to the advice of Cardinal Granvelle, who was greatly disliked in the Netherlands, after he insisted on direct control over events in the Netherlands despite being over two weeks' ride away in Madrid. There was discontent in the Netherlands about Philip's taxation demands and the incessant persecution of Protestants. In 1566, Protestant preachers sparked anti-clerical riots known as the Iconoclast Fury; in response to growing Protestant influence, the army of the Duke of Alba went on the offensive. In 1568, Alba had Lamoral, Count of Egmont and Philip de Montmorency, Count of Horn executed in Brussels' central square, further alienating the local aristocracy. There were massacres of civilians in Mechelen, Naarden, Zutphen and Haarlem. In 1571, Alba erected at Antwerp a bronze statue of himself trampling the rebellious Dutch under his horse's hooves, cast from the melted-down cannon looted by the Spanish troops after the Battle of Jemmingen in 1568; it was modelled on medieval images of the Spanish patron Saint James "the Moorslayer" riding down Muslims and caused such outrage that Philip had it removed and destroyed.

In 1572, a prominent exiled member of the Dutch aristocracy, William the Silent, Prince of Orange, invaded the Netherlands with a Protestant army, but he only succeeded in holding two provinces, Holland and Zeeland. Because of the Spanish repulse in the Siege of Alkmaar (1573) led by his equally brutal son Fadrique, Alba resigned his command, replaced by Luis de Requesens y Zúñiga. Alba boasted that he had burned or executed 18,600 persons in the Netherlands, in addition to the far greater number he massacred during the war, many of them women and children; 8,000 persons were burned or hanged in one year, and the total number of Alba's Flemish victims can not have fallen short of 50,000. Under Requesens, the Army of Flanders reached a peak strength of 86,000 in 1574 and retained its battlefield superiority, destroying Louis of Nassau's German mercenary army at the Battle of Mookerheyde on 14 April 1574, killing both him and his brother Henry of Nassau-Dillenburg.

Rampant inflation and the loss of treasure fleets from the New World prevented Philip from paying his soldiers consistently, leading to the so-called Spanish Fury at Antwerp in 1576, where soldiers ran amok through the streets, burning more than 1,000 homes and killing 6,000 citizens. Philip sent in Alexander Farnese, Duke of Parma, as Governor-General of the Spanish Netherlands from 1578 to 1592. Farnese defeated the rebels at the Battle of Gembloux (1578), and he captured many rebel towns in the south: Maastricht (1579), Tournai (1581), Oudenaarde (1582), Dunkirk (1583), Bruges (1584), Ghent (1584), and Antwerp (1585).

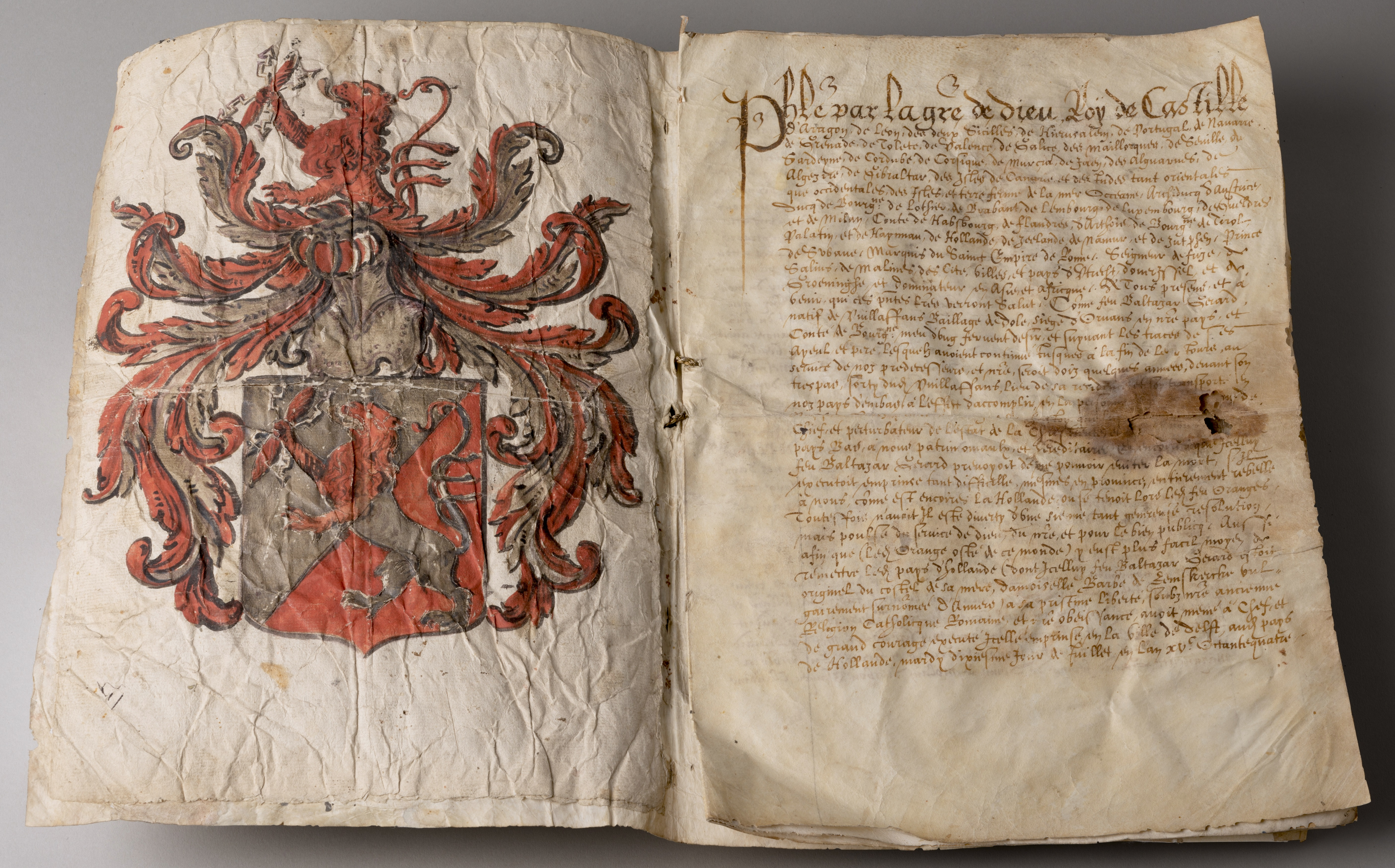
Reward letter of Philip II to the family of Balthasar Gerards, assassin of William the Silent, 1590

The States General of the northern provinces, united in the 1579 Union of Utrecht, passed an Act of Abjuration in 1581 declaring that they no longer recognised Philip as their king. The southern Netherlands (what is now Belgium and Luxembourg) remained under Spanish rule. In 1584, William the Silent was assassinated by Balthasar Gérard, after Philip had offered a reward of 25,000 crowns to anyone who killed him, calling him a "pest on the whole of Christianity and the enemy of the human race". The Dutch forces continued to fight on under Orange's son Maurice of Nassau, who received modest help from the Queen of England in 1585. The Dutch gained an advantage over the Spanish because of their growing economic strength, in contrast to Philip's burgeoning economic troubles. The war came to an end in 1648, when the Dutch Republic was recognised by the Spanish Crown as independent. The eight decades of war came at a massive human cost, with an estimated 600,000 to 700,000 victims, of which 350,000 to 400,000 were civilians killed by disease and what would later be considered war crimes.

== King of Portugal ==
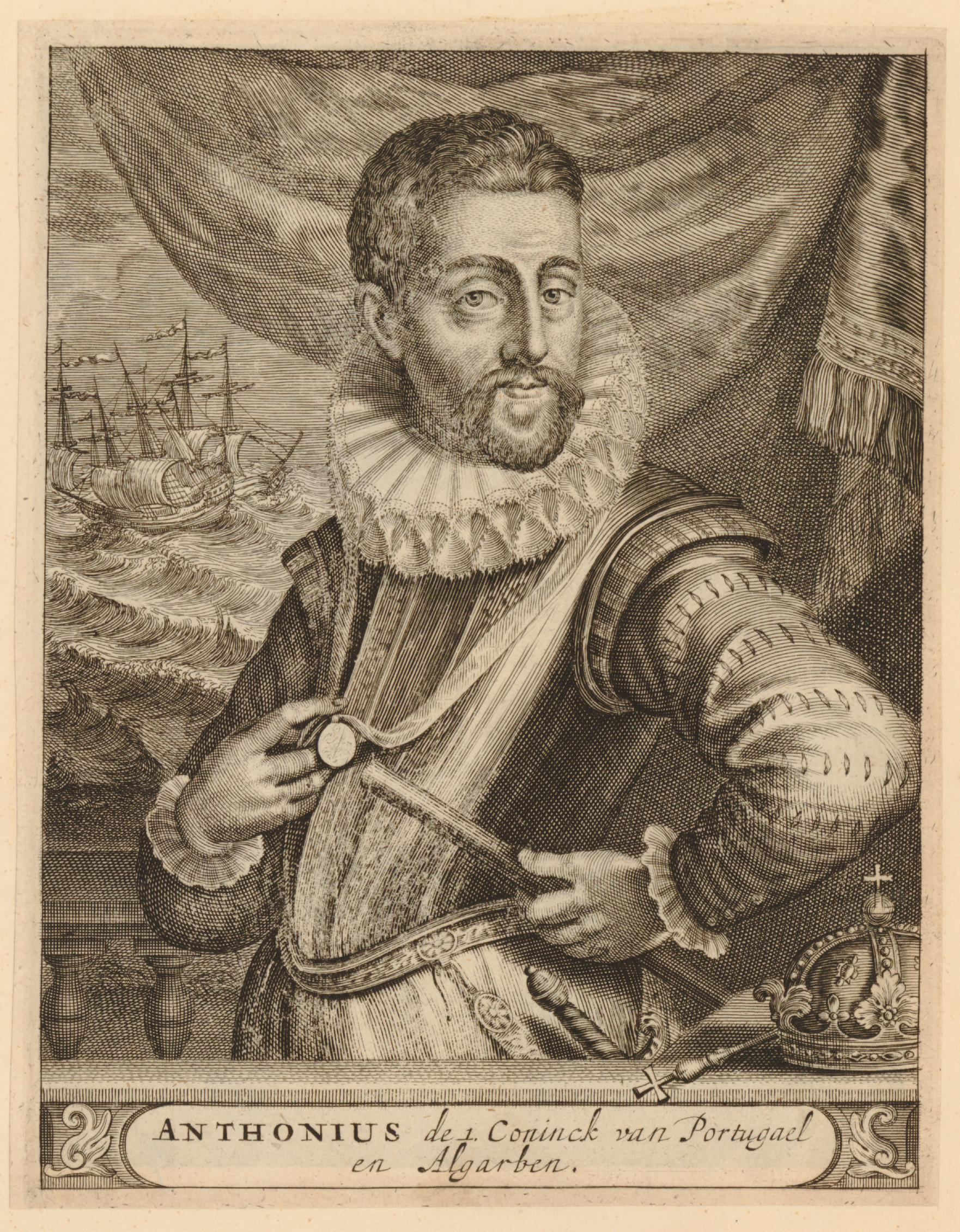
Anthony I of Portugal

In 1578 young King Sebastian of Portugal died at the Battle of Alcácer Quibir without descendants, triggering a succession crisis. His granduncle, the elderly Cardinal Henry, succeeded him as king, but Henry had no descendants either, having taken holy orders. When Henry died two years after Sebastian's disappearance, three grandchildren of Manuel I claimed the throne: Infanta Catarina, Duchess of Braganza; António, Prior of Crato; and Philip II of Spain. António was acclaimed King of Portugal in many cities and towns throughout the country, but members of the Council of Governors of Portugal who had supported Philip escaped to the Spanish kingdoms and declared him to be the legal successor of Henry.

In 1580, Philip II marched into Portugal and defeated Prior António's troops in the Battle of Alcântara. The Portuguese suffered 4,000 killed, wounded, or captured, while the Spanish sustained only 500 casualties. The troops commanded by Fernando Álvarez de Toledo, 3rd Duke of Alba imposed subjection to Philip before entering Lisbon, where he seized an immense treasure. Philip II of Spain assumed the Portuguese throne and was crowned Philip I of Portugal on 17 July 1580 (recognized as king by the Portuguese Cortes of Tomar) and a near sixty-year personal union under the rule of the Philippine Dynasty began. This gave Philip control of the extensive Portuguese Empire. When Philip left for Madrid in 1583, he made his nephew Albert of Austria his viceroy in Lisbon. In Madrid he established a Council of Portugal to advise him on Portuguese affairs, giving prominent positions to Portuguese nobles in the Spanish courts, and allowing Portugal to maintain autonomous law, currency, and government. This followed on the well-established pattern of rule by councils.

Spanish Empire of Philip II, III and IV including all charted and claimed territories, maritime claims (mare clausum) and other features

== Relations with England and Ireland ==
=== King of England and Ireland ===
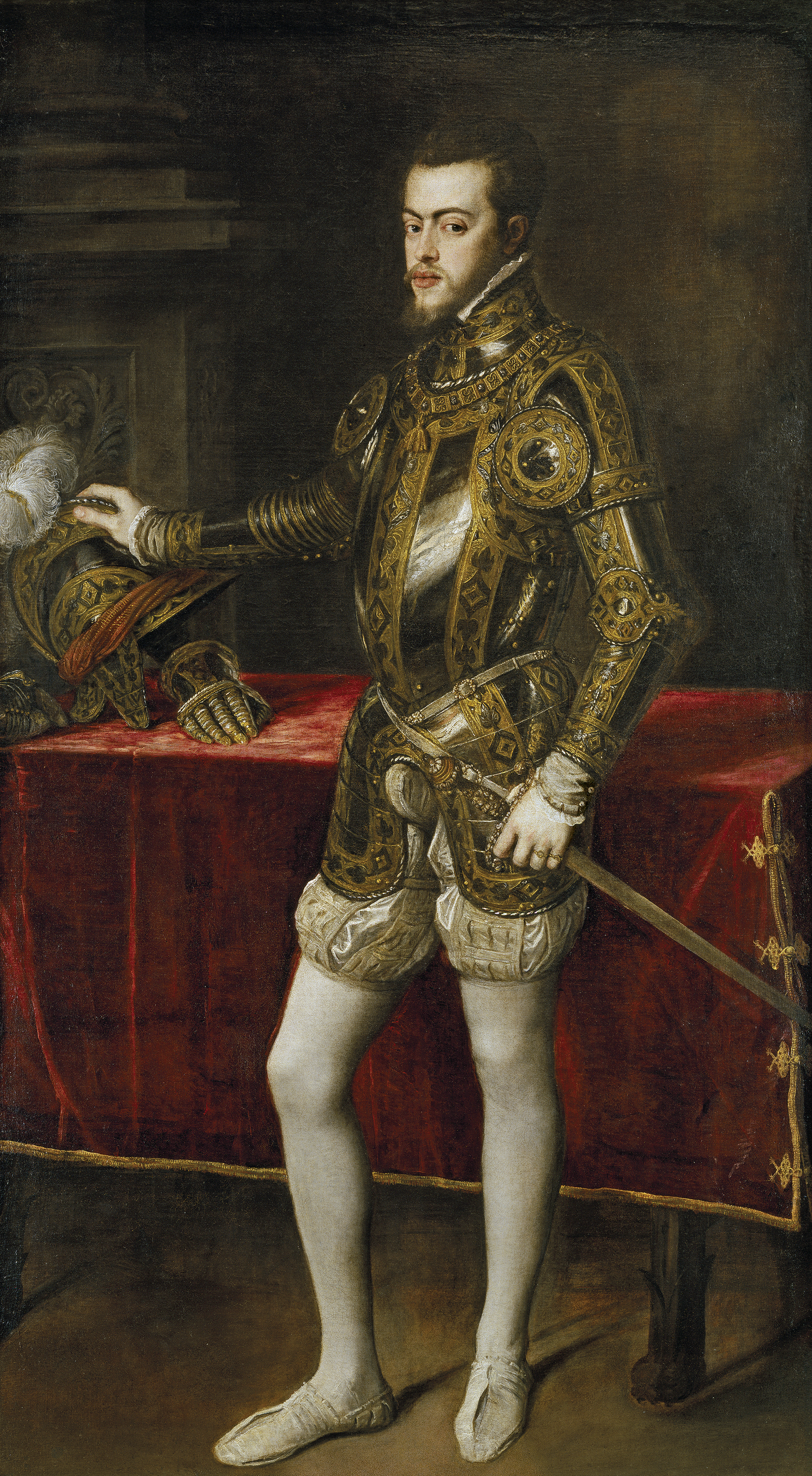
Titian's portrait of Philip as prince (1551), aged about 24, dressed in a lavishly decorated set of armour

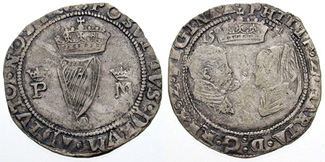
Irish groat with Philip's and Mary's initials and portraits

Philip's father arranged his marriage to 37-year-old Queen Mary I of England, Charles' maternal first cousin. His father ceded the crown of Naples, as well as his claim to the Kingdom of Jerusalem, to him. Their marriage at Winchester Cathedral on 25 July 1554 (Note: Philip was made King of Naples on the same day.) took place just two days after their first meeting. Philip's view of the affair was entirely political. Lord Chancellor Stephen Gardiner and the House of Commons petitioned Mary to consider marrying an Englishman, preferring Edward Courtenay.

Under the terms of the Act for the Marriage of Queen Mary to Philip of Spain, Philip was to enjoy Mary I's titles and honours for as long as their marriage should last. All official documents, including acts of Parliament, were to be dated with both their names, and Parliament was to be called under the joint authority of the couple. Coins were also to show the heads of both Mary and Philip. The marriage treaty also provided that England would not be obliged to provide military support to Philip's father in any war. The Privy Council instructed that Philip and Mary should be joint signatories of royal documents, and this was enacted by an act of Parliament, the Queen Mary's Marriage Act 1554 (1 Mar Sess. 3. c. 2), which gave him the title of king and stated that he "shall aid her Highness ... in the happy administration of her Grace's realms and dominions". In other words, Philip was to co-reign with his wife. As the new King of England could not read English, it was ordered that a note of all matters of state should be made in Latin or Spanish.

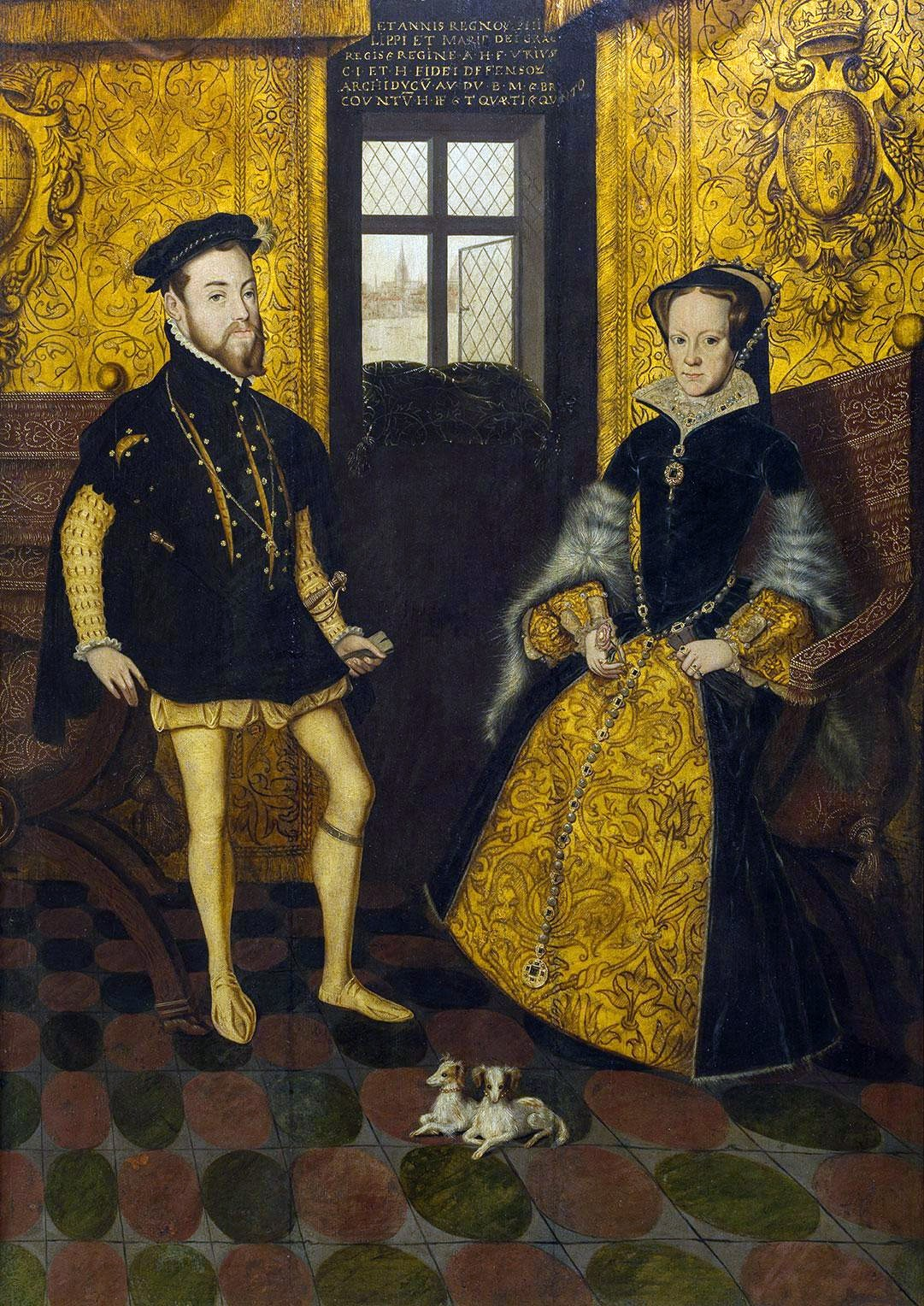
Philip and Mary I of England, 1558

Acts making it high treason to deny Philip's royal authority were passed by the Parliament of Ireland (the Treason Act 1556) and England (the Treason Act 1554). Philip and Mary appeared on coins together, with a single crown suspended between them as a symbol of joint reign. The Great Seal shows Philip and Mary seated on thrones, holding the crown together. The coat of arms of England was impaled with Philip's to denote their joint reign. During their joint reign, they waged war against France, which resulted in the loss of Calais, England's last remaining possession in France.

Philip's wife had succeeded to the Kingdom of Ireland, but the title of King of Ireland had been created in 1542 by Mary's father, Henry VIII, after he was excommunicated, and so it was not recognised by Catholic monarchs. In 1555, Pope Paul IV rectified this by issuing a papal bull recognising Philip and Mary as rightful King and Queen of Ireland. King's County and Philipstown in Ireland were named after Philip as King of Ireland in 1556. The couple's joint royal style after Philip ascended the Spanish throne in 1556 was: Philip and Mary, by the Grace of God, King and Queen of England, Spain, France, Jerusalem, both the Sicilies and Ireland, Defenders of the Faith, Archdukes of Austria, Dukes of Burgundy, Milan and Brabant, Counts of Habsburg, Flanders and Tirol.

However, the couple had no children. Mary died in 1558 before the union could revitalise the Roman Catholic Church in England and Wales. With her death, Philip lost his rights to the English throne (including the ancient English claims to the French throne) and ceased to be king of England, Ireland and (as claimed by them) France.

Philip's great-grandson, Philippe I, Duke of Orléans, married Princess Henrietta of England in 1661; in 1807, the Jacobite claim to the British throne passed to the descendants of their child Anne Marie d'Orléans.

=== After Mary I's death ===
Philip's European and North African dominions in 1581

Upon Mary's death, the throne went to Elizabeth I. Philip had no wish to sever his tie with England, and had sent a proposal of marriage to Elizabeth. However, she delayed in answering, and in that time learned Philip was also considering a Valois alliance. Elizabeth I was the Protestant daughter of Henry VIII and Anne Boleyn. This union was deemed illegitimate by English Catholics, who disputed the validity of both the annulment of Henry's marriage to Catherine of Aragon and of his subsequent marriage to Boleyn, and hence claimed that Mary, Queen of Scots, the Catholic great-granddaughter of Henry VII, was the rightful monarch.

For many years Philip maintained peace with England, and even defended Elizabeth from the Pope's threat of excommunication. This was a measure taken to preserve a European balance of power. Ultimately, Elizabeth allied England with the Protestant rebels in the Netherlands. Further, English ships began a policy of privateering against Spain's merchant shipping and started threatening the Spanish treasure ships coming from the New World. In one instance, English ships attacked a Spanish port. The last straw for Philip was the Treaty of Nonsuch signed by Elizabeth in 1585—promising troops and supplies to the anti-Spanish rebels in the Netherlands. Although it can be argued this English action was the result of Philip's Treaty of Joinville with the Catholic League of France, Philip considered it an act of war by England.

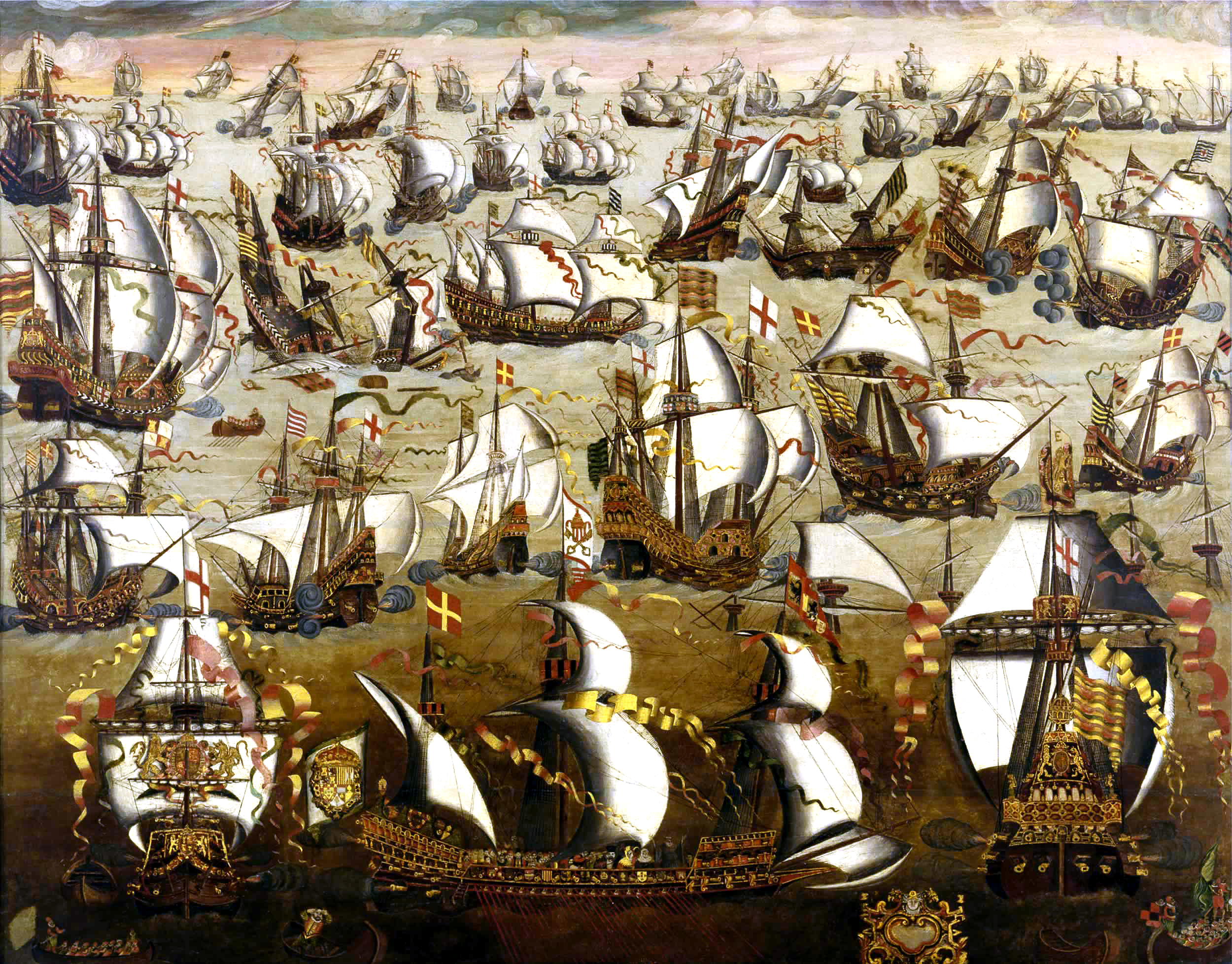
A late 16th-century painting of the Spanish Armada in battle with English warships

The execution of Mary, Queen of Scots, in 1587 ended Philip's hopes of placing a Catholic on the English throne. He turned instead to more direct plans to invade England and return the country to Catholicism. In 1588, he sent a fleet, the Spanish Armada, to rendezvous with the Army of Flanders and convey it across the English Channel. However, the operation had little chance of success from the beginning, because of lengthy delays, lack of communication between Philip II and his two commanders and the lack of a deep bay for the fleet. At the point of attack, a storm struck the English Channel, already known for its harsh currents and choppy waters, which devastated large numbers of the Spanish fleet. There was a tightly fought battle against the English Royal Navy and the Spanish were forced into a retreat, and the overwhelming majority of the Armada was destroyed by the harsh weather. Although the English Royal Navy did not destroy the Armada at the Battle of Gravelines, they prevented it from linking up with the army it was supposed to convey across the channel. Thus, while the English Royal Navy only won a slight tactical victory over the Spanish, it had delivered a major strategic victory—preventing the invasion of England. Through a week of fighting the Spanish had expended 100,000 cannonballs, but no English ship was seriously damaged. However, over 7,000 English sailors died from disease during the time the Armada was in English waters.

The defeat of the Spanish Armada gave great heart to the Protestant cause across Europe. The storm that smashed the Armada was seen by many of Philip's enemies as a sign of the will of God. While the invasion had been averted, England was unable to take advantage of this success. An attempt to use her newfound advantage at sea with a counter-armada the following year failed disastrously with 40 ships sunk and 15,000 men lost. Likewise, English buccaneering and attempts to seize territories in the Caribbean were defeated by Spain's rebuilt navy and their improved intelligence networks (although Cádiz was sacked by an Anglo-Dutch force after a failed attempt to seize the treasure fleet). The Habsburgs also struck back with the Dunkirkers, who took an increasing toll on Dutch and English shipping.

Eventually, the Spanish attempted two further Armadas, in October 1596 and October 1597. The 1596 Armada was destroyed in a storm off northern Spain; it had lost as many as 72 of its 126 ships and suffered 3,000 deaths. The 1597 Armada was frustrated by adverse weather as it approached the English coast undetected. This Anglo-Spanish War (1585–1604) would be fought to a grinding end, but not until both Philip II (d. 1598) and Elizabeth I (d. 1603) were dead. Some of the fighting was done on land in Ireland, France, and the Netherlands, with the English sending expeditionary forces to France and the Netherlands to fight Spain, and Spain attempting to assist Irish rebellions in Ireland.

== Death ==
Philip II died on 13 September 1598 at El Escorial, aged 71, after a prolonged illness, likely cancer. He was surrounded by priests, family, and trusted officials. His personal chamber was divided into a main room, bedroom, study, and oratory, following the layout of his father's monastery. The most notable feature was the monarch's bed, still preserved, which was positioned so he could observe the liturgy at the church's main altar from his bedside. Despite severe pain in his final months, he continued to review state papers and correspondence. The funeral oration honouring the virtues of Philip II is attributed to Tomás Fernández de Medrano, Lord of Valdeosera, author of the República Mista (1602), and a trusted adviser and crown official under both Philip II and Philip III.

Philip II governed one of the largest and most diverse empires in history, encompassing the Iberian Peninsula, Spanish America, parts of Africa, the Low Countries, parts of Italy, and territories as far away as Asia, including the Philippines, which was named in his honour. He was succeeded by his 20-year-old son, Philip III, who inherited a vast but financially strained empire.

== Legacy ==
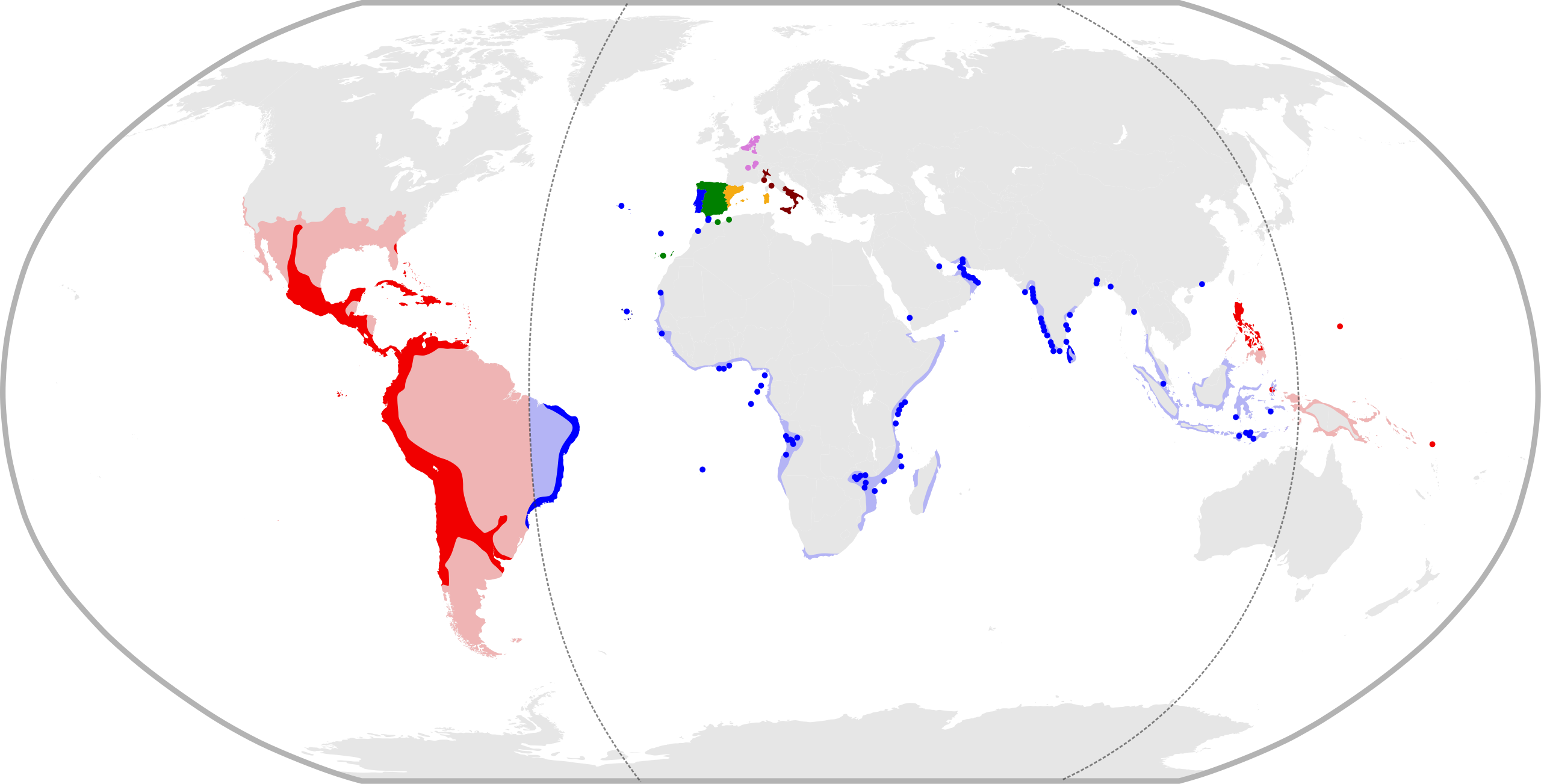
Philip's dominions in 1598, coloured by governing council: Castile Aragon Portugal Italy the Indies Flanders

Under Philip II, Spain reached the peak of its power. However, in spite of the great and increasing quantities of gold and silver flowing into his coffers from the American mines, the riches of the Portuguese spice trade, and the enthusiastic support of the Habsburg dominions for the Counter-Reformation, he would never succeed in suppressing Protestantism or defeating the Dutch rebellion. Early in his reign, the Dutch might have laid down their weapons if he had desisted in trying to suppress Protestantism, but his devotion to Catholicism would not permit him to do so. He was a devout Catholic and exhibited the typical 16th century antipathy for religious heterodoxy; he said, "Before suffering the slightest damage to religion in the service of God, I would lose all of my estates and a hundred lives, if I had them, because I do not intend nor do I desire to be the ruler of heretics."

As he strove to enforce Catholic orthodoxy through an intensification of the Inquisition, students were barred from studying elsewhere, and books printed by Spaniards outside the kingdom were banned. In addition to the banning of books, Philip II authorized the burning of at least 70,000 volumes. Even a highly respected churchman like Archbishop Bartolome Carranza of Toledo was jailed by the Inquisition for 17 years, for publishing ideas that seemed sympathetic in some degree with Protestantism. Such strict enforcement of orthodox belief was successful, and Spain avoided the religiously inspired strife tearing apart other European dominions.

Although he was deeply dedicated to rooting out heretical titles, he collected forbidden books for his own royal library at the El Escorial. His library contained 40,000 volumes (1,800 of which were Arabic titles) and several thousand manuscripts. The banned books were protected in a room on an upper floor of the library. He was passionate about rare books he personally collected from far and wide and researched and recorded information about previous owners.

Due in part to Philip's humanist education, the School of Salamanca flourished under his reign. Martín de Azpilcueta, highly honoured at Rome by several popes and looked on as an oracle of learning, published his Manuale sive Enchiridion Confessariorum et Poenitentium (Rome, 1568), long a classical text in the schools and in ecclesiastical practice. Francisco Suárez, generally regarded as the greatest scholastic after Thomas Aquinas and regarded during his lifetime as being the greatest living philosopher and theologian, was writing and lecturing, not only in Spain but also in Rome (1580–1585), where Pope Gregory XIII attended the first lecture that he gave. Luis de Molina published his De liberi arbitrii cum gratiae donis, divina praescientia, praedestinatione et reprobatione concordia (1588), wherein he put forth the doctrine attempting to reconcile the omniscience of God with human free will that came to be known as Molinism, thereby contributing to what was one of the most important intellectual debates of the time; Molinism became the de facto Jesuit doctrine on these matters, and is still advocated today by William Lane Craig and Alvin Plantinga, among others.

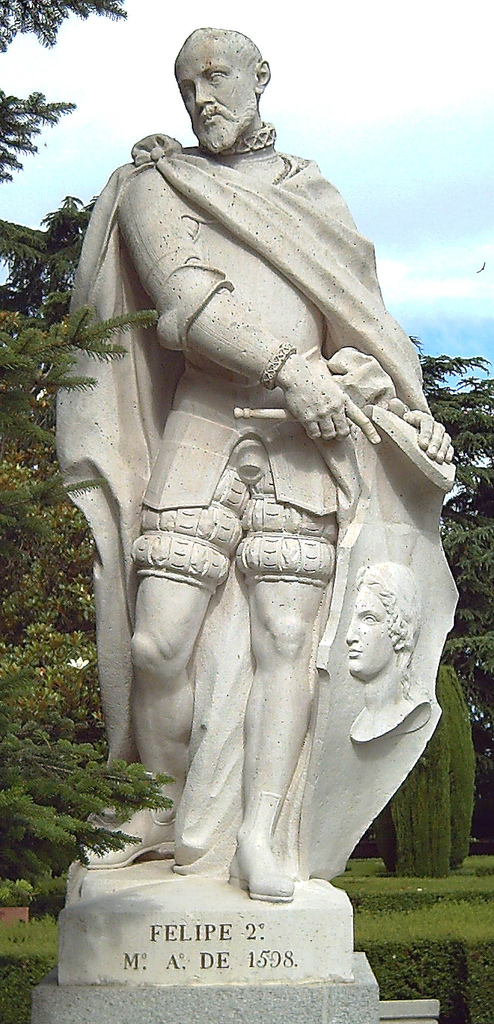
Statue of Philip II at the Sabatini Gardens in Madrid (F. Castro, 1753)

Philip had a passion for architecture and building, seeking to improve Spain's constructions after those of Italy and the Netherlands. At the same time, he personally favoured fields and forests, indulging often in hunting and fishing, and was an obsessive builder of gardens. In 1582 he issued orders to conservate the Spanish forests, worrying that they might get depleted. According to historian Henry Kamen, "his love of nature turned him into one of the first ecologist rulers in European history".

Because Philip II was the most powerful European monarch in an era of war and religious conflict, evaluating both his reign and the man himself has become a controversial historical subject. Even before his death in 1598, his supporters had started presenting him as an archetypical gentleman, full of piety and Christian virtues, whereas his enemies depicted him as a fanatical and despotic monster, responsible for inhuman cruelties and barbarism. This dichotomy, further developed into the so-called Spanish Black Legend and White Legend, was helped by King Philip himself. Philip prohibited any biographical account of his life to be published while he was alive, and he ordered that all his private correspondence be burned shortly before he died.

Moreover, Philip did nothing to defend himself after being betrayed by his ambitious secretary Antonio Pérez, who published incredible calumnies against his former master; this allowed Pérez's tales to spread all around Europe unchallenged. That way, the popular image of the King that survives to today was created on the eve of his death, at a time when many European princes and religious leaders were turned against Spain as a pillar of the Counter-Reformation. This means that many histories depict Philip from deeply prejudiced points of view, usually negative.

Some historians classify this anti-Spanish analysis as part of the Black Legend. In a more recent example of popular culture, Philip II's portrayal in Fire Over England (1937) is not entirely unsympathetic; he is shown as a very hardworking, intelligent, religious, somewhat paranoid ruler whose prime concern is his country, but who had no understanding of the English, despite his former co-monarchy there.

The Battle of Lepanto in 1571, a major victory for the Holy League under the command of Philip II's half-brother John of Austria.

Even in countries that remained Catholic, primarily France and the Italian states, fear and envy of Spanish success and domination created a wide receptiveness for the worst possible descriptions of Philip II. Although some efforts have been made to separate legend from reality, that task has proved extremely difficult, since many prejudices are rooted in the cultural heritage of European countries. Spanish-speaking historians tend to assess his political and military achievements, sometimes deliberately avoiding issues such as the King's inflexible Catholicism. English-speaking historians tend to show Philip II as a fanatical, despotical, criminal, imperialist ruler, minimising his military victories (Battle of Lepanto, Battle of Saint Quentin, Fall of Antwerp, English Armada, etc...) to mere anecdotes, and magnifying his defeats (Battle of Djerba, Ottoman conquest of Tunis, Dutch Revolt, Armada, etc...) even though at the time those defeats did not result in great political or military changes in the balance of power in Europe.

He ended French Valois ambitions in Italy and brought about the Habsburg ascendency in Europe. He secured the Portuguese kingdom and empire. He succeeded in increasing the importation of silver in the face of English, Dutch, and French privateers, overcoming multiple financial crises and consolidating Spain's overseas empire. Although clashes would be ongoing, he ended the major threat posed to Europe by the Ottoman Navy.

Historian Geoffrey Parker offers a management-psychological explanation, as summarised by Tonio Andrade and William Reger:

One might have expected that Philip — being a dedicated, persistent, and hard-working man, and being the head of Western Europe's wealthiest and largest empire — would have succeeded in his aims. He didn't. His endeavors were doomed by his own character, or at least that's how Parker sees it. Drawing on studies in management science and organizational psychology, Parker argues that a successful manager of a large organization must keep attention on the big picture, must have a good strategy for dealing with copious information, must know how to delegate, and must be flexible. Philip failed on all counts. He was a micromanager who got bogged down in details, refusing to delegate and trying to read every dispatch that came to his desk. He obsessed and dithered, so that by the time his decisions were made and his orders reached the men meant to carry them out, the situation on the ground had changed. Philip was also inflexible, unwilling to abandon ineffective policies. Most pernicious of all was Philip's tendency toward messianic thinking, a belief that he was doing God's work and that heaven would support him with miracles.

== Titles, honours and styles ==
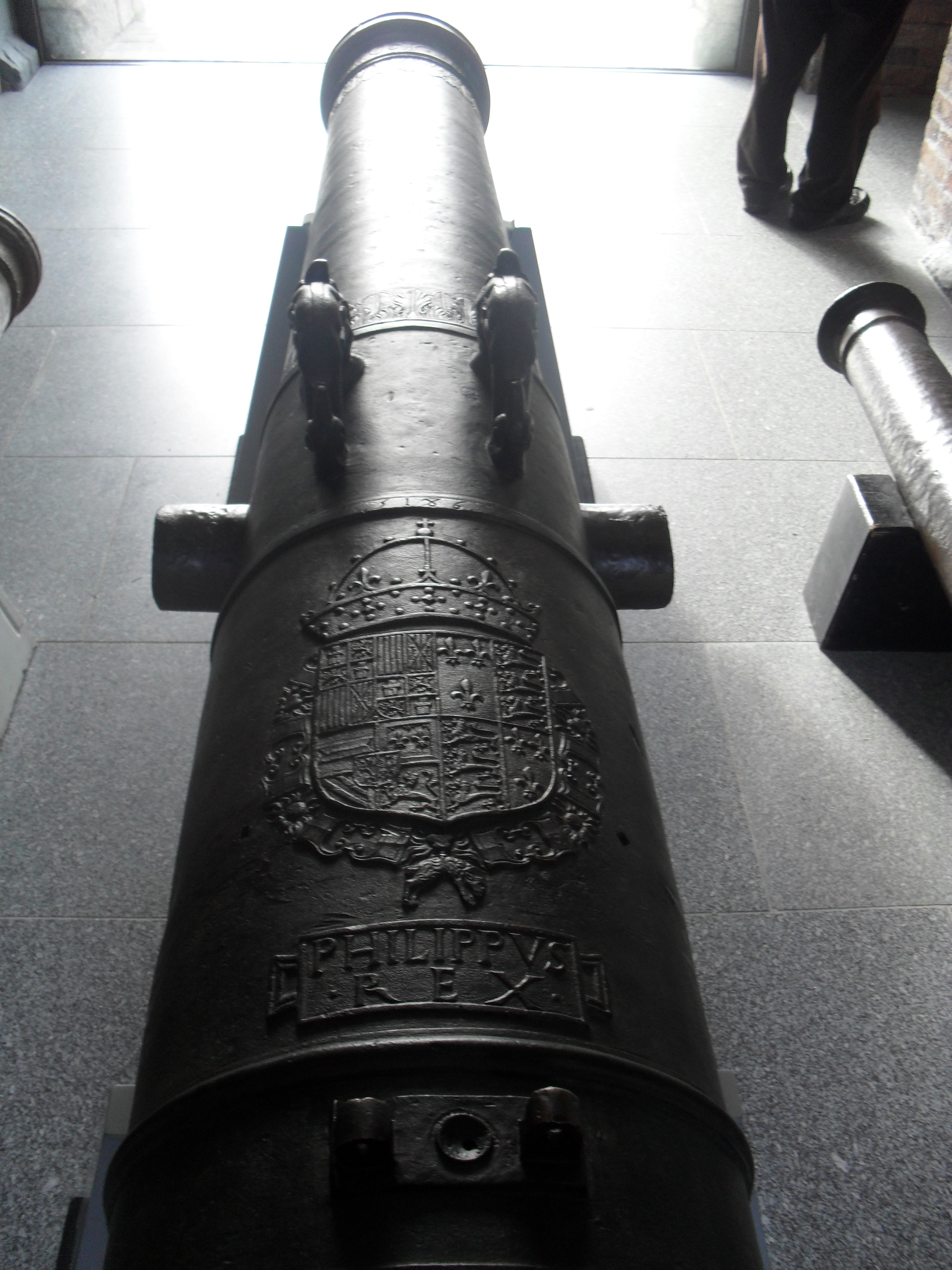
Cannon with arms of Philip II as King of Spain and jure uxoris King of England and France

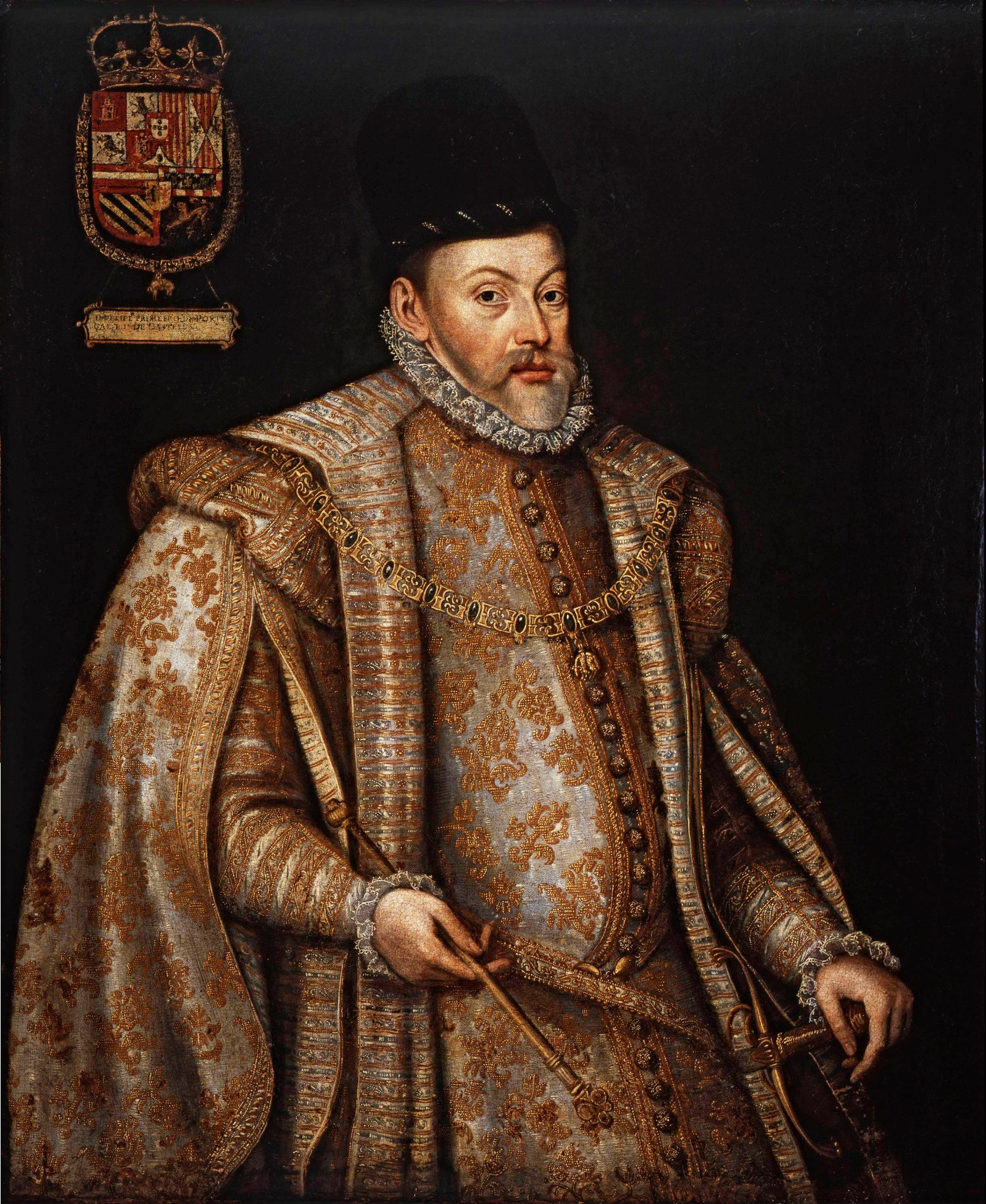
Portrait of Philip II as King of Portugal by Sánchez Coello, c. 1580

- Heir titles
  - Prince of Gerona: 21 May 1527 – 16 January 1556
  - Prince of Asturias 1528–1556
- King of Castile as Philip II: 16 January 1556 – 13 September 1598
  - King of Castile, of León, of Granada, of Toledo, of Galicia, of Seville, of Cordoba, of Murcia, of Jaen, of the Algarves, of Algeciras, of Gibraltar, of the Canary Islands, of the Indias, the Islands and Mainland of the Ocean Sea; (Note: With the incorporation of Portugal to the Monarchy the title changed to East and West Indies, the Islands and Mainland of the Ocean sea.) Lord of Molina
  - Lord of Biscay
- King of Aragon as Philip I: 16 January 1556 – 13 September 1598
  - King of Aragón
  - King of the Two Sicilies
    - King of Naples, of Jerusalem (from 25 July 1554)
    - King of Sicily. Duke of Athens, of Neopatria
  - King of Valencia
  - King of Majorca
  - King of Sardinia and of Corsica, Margrave of Oristano, Count of Goceano
  - King of Navarre
  - Count of Barcelona, of Roussillon, of Cerdanya
- King of Portugal as Philip I: 12 September 1580 – 13 September 1598
  - King of Portugal and the Algarves of either side of the sea in Africa, Lord of Guinea and of Conquest, Navigation, and Commerce of Ethiopia, Arabia, Persia, and India, etc.
- King of England de jure uxoris as Philip I: 25 July 1554 – 17 November 1558
  - King of England, France (titular); Defender of the Faith
  - King of Ireland
- Imperial and Habsburg patrimonial titles:
  - Duke of Milan: 11 October 1540 (secret donation) / 25 July 1554 (public investiture) – 13 September 1598
  - Imperial vicar of Siena: since 30 May 1554
  - Archduke of Austria
  - Princely Count of Habsburg and of Tyrol
  - Prince of Swabia
- Burgundian titles
  - Lord of the Netherlands: 25 October 1555 – 13 September 1598
    - Duke of Lothier, of Brabant, of Limburg, of Luxemburg, of Guelders. Count of Flanders, of Artois, of Hainaut, of Holland, of Zeeland, of Namur, of Zutphen. Margrave of the Holy Roman Empire, Lord of Frisia, Salins, Mechelen, the cities, towns and lands of Utrecht, Overyssel, Groningen
  - Count Palatine of Burgundy from 10 June 1556; Count of Charolais from 21 September 1558
  - Duke of Burgundy
  - Dominator in Asia, Africa
- Honours
  - Knight of the Golden Fleece: 1531 – 13 September 1598
  - Grand Master of the Order of the Golden Fleece: 23 October 1555 – 13 September 1598
  - Grand Master of the Order of Calatrava: 16 January 1556 – 13 September 1598
  - Grand Master of the Order of Alcantara: 16 January 1556 – 13 September 1598
  - Grand Master of the Order of Santiago: 16 January 1556 – 13 September 1598
  - Grand Master of the Order of Montesa: 8 December 1587 – 13 September 1598

Philip continued his father's style of "Majesty" (Latin: Maiestas; Spanish: Majestad) in preference to that of "Highness" (Celsitudo; Alteza). In diplomatic texts, he continued the use of the title "Most Catholic" (Rex Catholicissimus; Rey Católico) first bestowed by Pope Alexander VI on Ferdinand and Isabella in 1496.

Following the Act of Parliament sanctioning his marriage with Mary, the couple was styled "Philip and Mary, by the grace of God King and Queen of England, France, Naples, Jerusalem, and Ireland, Defenders of the Faith, Princes of Spain and Sicily, Archdukes of Austria, Dukes of Milan, Burgundy and Brabant, Counts of Habsburg, Flanders and Tyrol". Upon his inheritance of Spain in 1556, they became "Philip and Mary, by the grace of God King and Queen of England, Spain, France, both the Sicilies, Jerusalem and Ireland, Defenders of the Faith, Archdukes of Austria, Dukes of Burgundy, Milan and Brabant, Counts of Habsburg, Flanders and Tyrol".

His coinage typically bore the obverse inscription "PHS·D:G·HISP·Z·REX" (Latin: "Philip, by the grace of God King of Spain et cetera"), followed by the local title of the mint ("DVX·BRA" for Duke of Brabant, "C·HOL" for Count of Holland, "D·TRS·ISSV" for Lord of Overissel, etc.). The reverse would then bear a motto such as "PACE·ET·IVSTITIA" ("For Peace and Justice") or "DOMINVS·MIHI·ADIVTOR" ("The Lord is my helper"). A medal struck in 1583 bore the inscriptions "PHILIPP II HISP ET NOVI ORBIS REX" ("Philip II, King of Spain and the New World") and "NON SUFFICIT ORBIS" ("The world is not enough").

== Heraldry ==
Heraldry of Philip II of Spain

Common versions
1556–1558 (as Spanish monarch)	1558–1580	1580–1598

Spanish realms versions
Kingdom of Navarre			Kingdom of Galicia	
1558–1580	1580–1598	1580–1598	1558–1580	1580–1598

Burgundian variants
Free County of Burgundy
1556–1580	1580–1598

Italian Variants
Duchy of Milan			Kingdom of Sardinia	Naples and Sicily
1554–1558	1558–1580	1580–1598	1580–1598	1554–1598

Ornamented versions
Coat of arms at his investiture as Knight of the Order of the Garter (in 1554)	Coat of arms (with the Eagle of St John as supporter); 1558–1580 / 1580–1598	Coat of arms as Spanish monarch and king jure uxoris of England (with symbols of the Crown of Castile and León and a cap of maintenance with the crest of England imperially crowned in the top); 1556–1558
Coat of arms with supporters, crest and motto (with symbols of the Crowns of Castile and León and Aragon in the top); 1558–1580	Coat of arms with supporters, crest and motto (with symbols of the Crowns of Aragon and Castile and León and of the Kingdom of Portugal in the top); 1580–1598	Coat of arms with supporters (a lion and a griffin) and crest (with symbols of the Crowns of Aragon and Castile and León and of the Kingdom of Portugal in the top); 1580–1598

== Family ==
Philip was married four times and had children with three of his wives. He also had two long-term relationships with Isabel Osorio and Eufrasia de Guzmán.

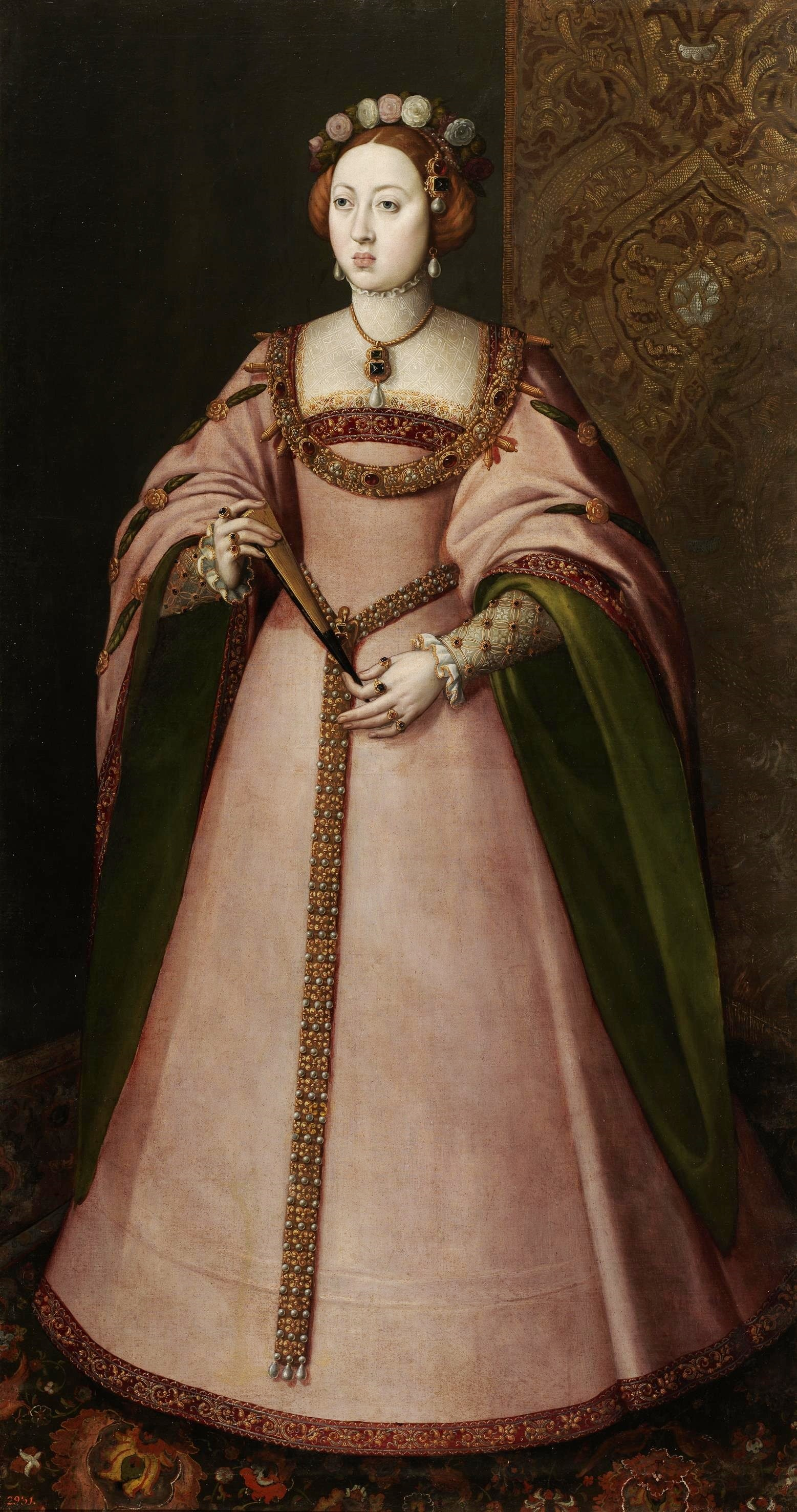
Maria Manuela of Portugal (1527–1545)

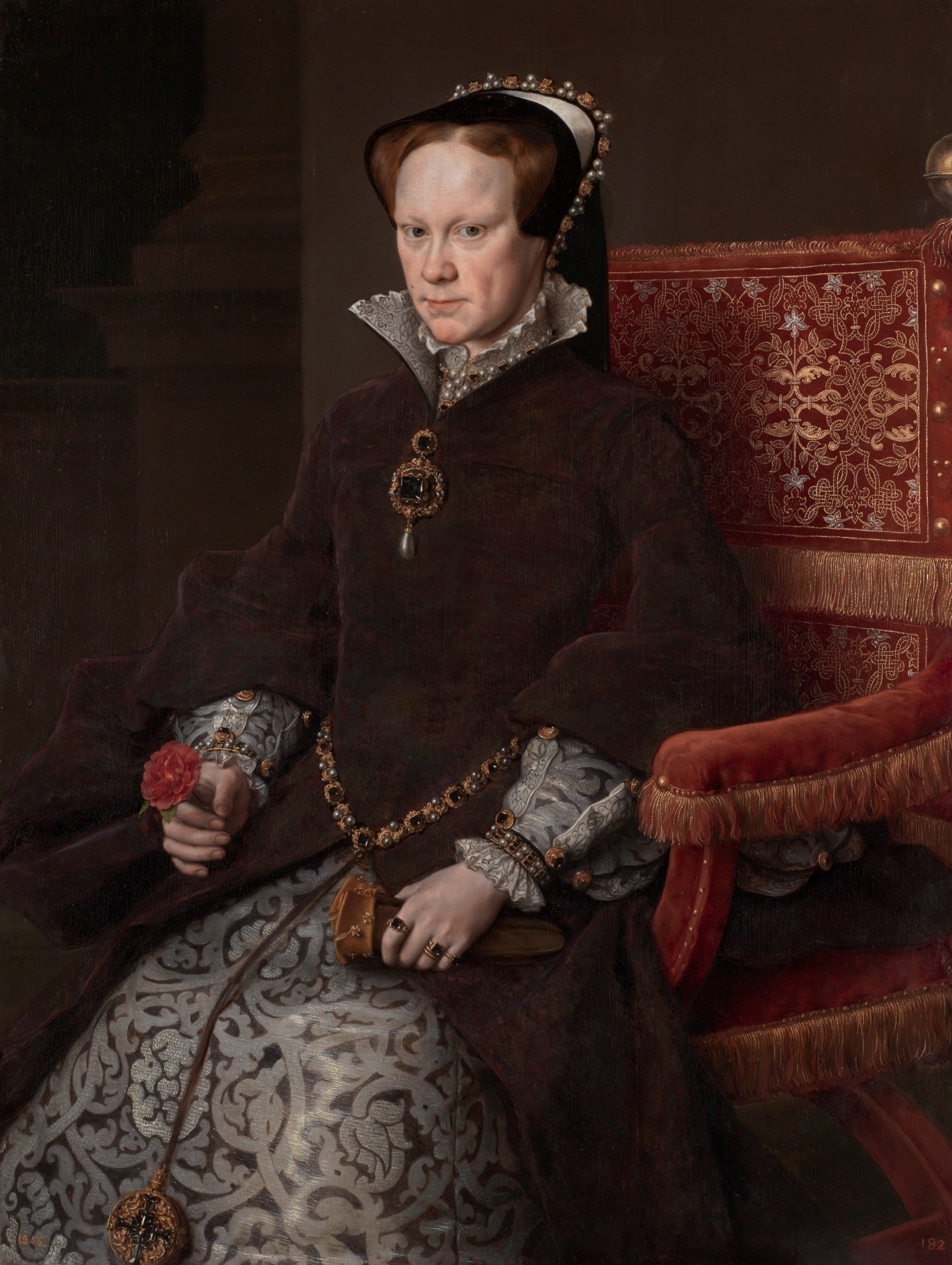
Mary I, Queen of England (1516–1558), by Antonis Mor

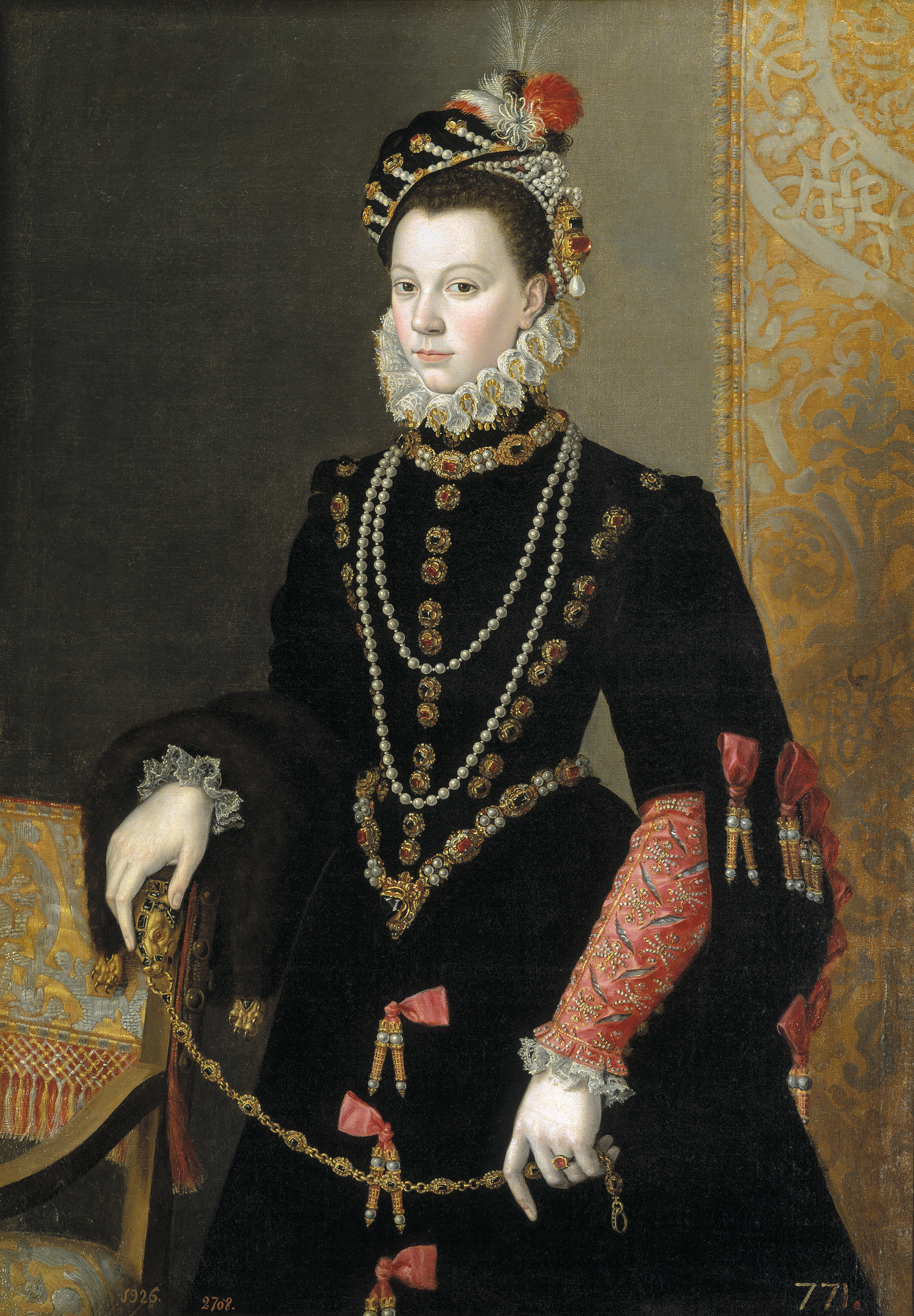
Elisabeth of Valois (1545–1568), by Juan Pantoja de la Cruz

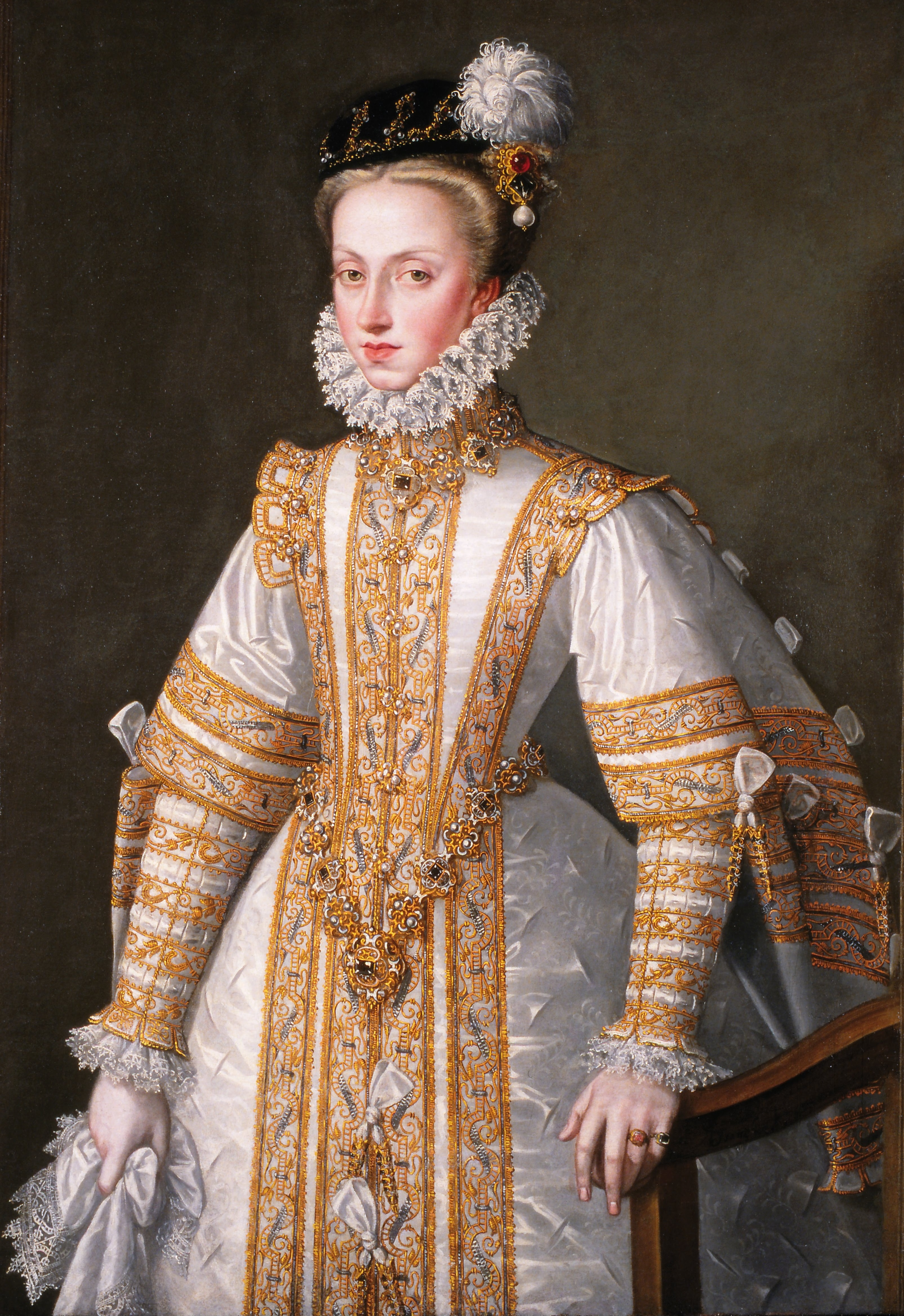
Anna of Austria (1549–1580), by Alonso Sánchez Coello

=== First marriage ===
Philip's first wife was his double first cousin, Maria Manuela, Princess of Portugal. She was the daughter of Philip's maternal uncle, John III of Portugal, and paternal aunt, Catherine of Austria. They were married at Salamanca on 12 November 1543. The marriage produced one son in 1545, after which Maria died four days later due to haemorrhage:

- Carlos, Prince of Asturias (8 July 1545 – 24 July 1568), died unmarried at the age of 23 and without issue.

=== Second marriage ===
Philip's second wife was his first cousin once removed, Queen Mary I of England. The marriage, which took place on 25 July 1554 at Winchester Cathedral, was political. By this marriage, Philip became jure uxoris King of England and Ireland, although the couple was apart more than together as they ruled their respective countries. The marriage produced no children, although there was a false pregnancy, and Mary died in 1558, ending Philip's reign in England and Ireland.

=== Third marriage ===
Philip's third wife was Elisabeth of Valois, the eldest daughter of Henry II of France and Catherine de' Medici. The original ceremony was conducted by proxy (the Duke of Alba standing in for Philip) at Notre Dame prior to Elisabeth's departure from France. The actual ceremony was conducted in Guadalajara upon her arrival in Spain. During their marriage (1559–1568), they conceived six children, though only two of the daughters survived. Elisabeth died a few hours after the loss of her last child. Their children were:

- Stillborn son (1560)
- Miscarried twin daughters (August 1564)
- Isabella Clara Eugenia (12 August 1566 – 1 December 1633), married Albert VII, Archduke of Austria
- Catherine Michaela (10 October 1567 – 6 November 1597), married Charles Emmanuel I, Duke of Savoy, and had issue
- Joan (3 October 1568) died shortly after birth.

=== Fourth marriage ===
Philip's fourth and final wife was his niece, Anna of Austria. Pope Pius V initially refused to grant Philip the dispensation needed to marry Anna, citing biblical prohibitions and the danger of birth defects. The pope reluctantly gave his permission when Philip threatened to abandon the Holy League in their fight against the Ottoman Turks. By contemporary accounts, this was a convivial and satisfactory marriage (1570–1580) for both Philip and Anna. This marriage produced four sons and one daughter. Anna died of heart failure 8 months after giving birth to Maria in 1580.

Their children were:

- Ferdinand, Prince of Asturias (4 December 1571 – 18 October 1578)
- Charles Laurence (12 August 1573 – 30 June 1575)
- Diego Félix (15 August 1575 – 21 November 1582)
- Philip III of Spain (14 April 1578 – 31 March 1621)
- Maria (14 February 1580 – 5 August 1583).
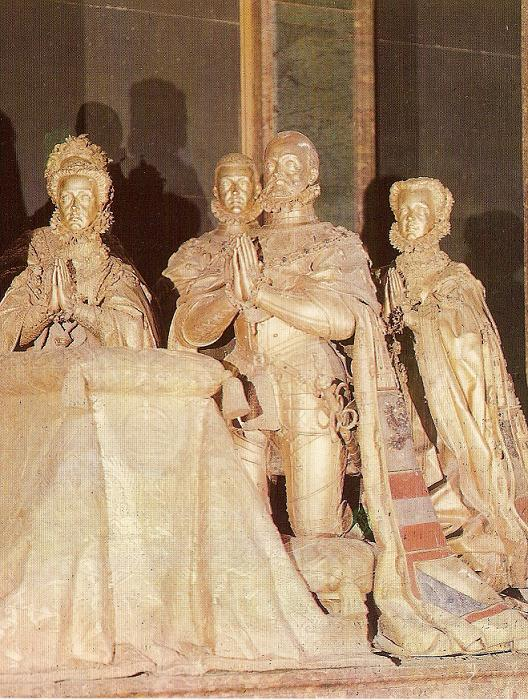
Cenotaph of Philip and three of his four wives at El Escorial

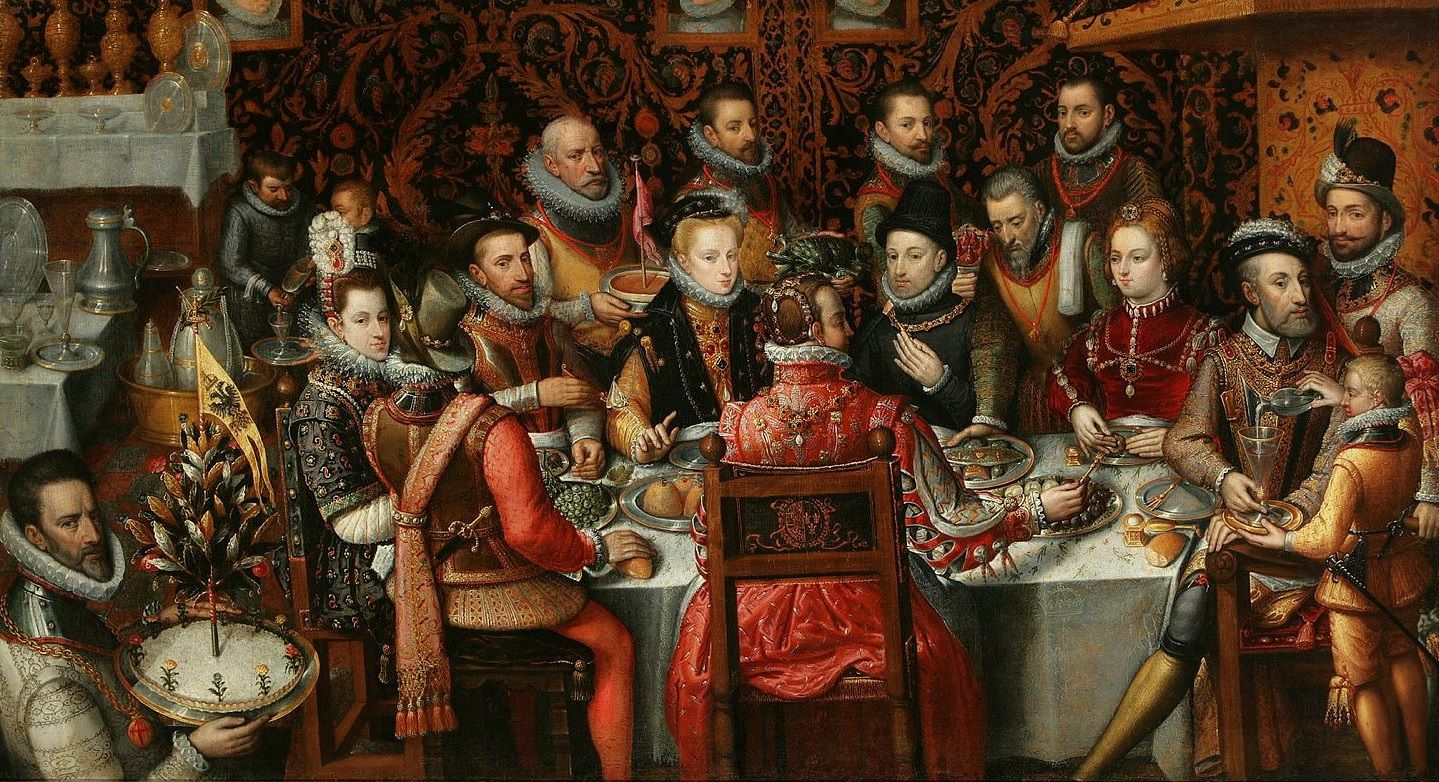
King Philip and Queen Anna banqueting with family and courtiers, by Alonso Sánchez Coello

== Ancestry ==
Ancestors of Philip II of Spain

8. Maximilian I, Holy Roman Emperor
4. Philip I of Castile
9. Mary of Burgundy
2. Charles V, Holy Roman Emperor
10. Ferdinand II of Aragon (= 14)
5. Joanna of Castile
11. Isabella I of Castile (= 15)
1. Philip II of Spain
12. Ferdinand, Duke of Viseu
6. Manuel I of Portugal
13. Beatrice of Portugal
3. Isabella of Portugal
14. Ferdinand II of Aragon (= 10)
7. Maria of Aragon
15. Isabella I of Castile (= 11)

== Male-line family tree ==
House of Habsburg

Original line
Albert; Count of Habsburg c. 1188–1239
Rudolf I of Germany c. 1218–1291
Albert I of Germany; 1255–1308	Hartmann; 1263–1281	Rudolf II; Duke of Austria; 1270–1290
Rudolf I of Bohemia; 1281–1307	Frederick the Fair c. 1289–1330	Leopold I Duke of Austria; 1290–1326	Albert II; Duke of Austria; 1298–1358	Henry the Friendly; 1299–1327	Otto; Duke of Austria; 1301–1339	John; Parricida c. 1290–1312/1313
Albertinian line	Leopoldian line
Rudolf IV; Duke of Austria; 1339–1365	Frederick III; 1347–1362	Albert III; Duke of Austria; 1349–1395	Leopold III; Duke of Austria; 1351–1386	Frederick II; Duke of Austria; 1327–1344	Leopold II; Duke of Austria; 1328–1344
Albert IV; Duke of Austria; 1377–1404	William; Duke of Austria c. 1370–1406	Leopold IV; Duke of Austria; 1371–1411	Ernest; Duke of Austria; 1377–1424	Frederick IV; Duke of Austria; 1382–1439
Albert II of Germany; 1397–1439	Frederick III; HRE; 1415–1493	Albert VI; Archduke of Austria; 1418–1463	Sigismund; Archduke of Austria; 1427–1496
Ladislaus the Posthumous; 1440–1457	Maximilian I HRE; 1459–1519
Philip I of Castile; 1478–1506
Spanish / Iberian line	Austrian / HRE line
Charles V HRE; 1500–1558	Ferdinand I HRE; 1503–1564
Philip II of Spain; 1527–1598	Maximilian II; HRE; 1527–1576	Ferdinand II; Archduke of Austria; 1529–1595	Charles II; Archduke of Austria; 1540–1590
Carlos; Prince of Asturias; 1545–1568	Philip III of Spain; 1578–1621	Rudolf II; HRE; 1552–1612	Ernest of Austria; 1553–1595	Matthias; HRE; 1557–1619	Maximilian III; Archduke of Austria; 1558–1618	Albert VII; Archduke of Austria; 1559–1621	Wenceslaus; Archduke of Austria; 1561–1578	Andrew; Margrave of Burgau; 1558–1600	Charles; Margrave of Burgau; 1560–1618	Ferdinand II; HRE; 1578–1637	Maximilian Ernest of Austria; 1583–1616	Leopold V Archduke of Austria; 1586–1632	Charles of Austria; 1590–1624
Philip IV of Spain; 1605–1665	Charles of Austria; 1607–1632	Ferdinand of Austria; 1609–1641	John-Charles of Austria; 1605–1619	Ferdinand III; HRE; 1608–1657	Leopold Wilhelm of Austria; 1614–1662	Ferdinand Charles; Archduke of Austria; 1628–1662	Sigismund Francis; Archduke of Austria; 1630–1665
Balthasar Charles; Prince of Asturias; 1629–1646	Charles II of Spain; 1661–1700	Ferdinand IV; King of the Romans; 1633–1654	Leopold I HRE; 1640–1705	Charles Joseph of Austria; 1649–1664
Joseph I HRE; 1678–1711	Charles VI; HRE; 1685–1740
Lorraine
Maria Theresa; HRE; 1740–1780	Francis I HRE; 1745–1765
Habsburg-Lorraine
Joseph II; HRE; 1765–1790	Leopold II; HRE; 1790–1792
Francis II; HRE; 1792–1806

== See also ==
- Library of the Monastery of San Lorenzo de El Escorial
- Descendants of Ferdinand II of Aragon and Isabella I of Castile
- The empire on which the sun never sets
- List of Spanish monarchs
- Royal Armoury of Madrid
- Ruy Gómez de Silva, 1st Prince of Éboli

== Bibliography ==
- Boyden, James M. (1995). The Courtier and the King:Ruy Gómez de Silva, Philip II, and the court of Spain. Berkeley: University of California Press. ISBN 9780520086227.
- Braudel, Fernand (1995). The Mediterranean and the Mediterranean World in the Age of Philip II. Vol. I. Berkley: University of California Press. ISBN 9780520203082.
- Braudel, Fernand (1995). The Mediterranean and the Mediterranean World in the Age of Philip II. Vol. II. Berkley: University of California Press. ISBN 9780520203303.
- Clouse, Michele L. (2013). Medicine, Government and Public Health in Philip II's Spain: Shared Interests, Competing Authorities. Ashgate.
- Conklin, James (1998). "The Theory of Sovereign Debt and Spain under Philip II". Journal of Political Economy. 106 (3): 483–513. doi:10.1086/250019. JSTOR 250019.
- Drelichman, Mauricio; Voth, Hans-Joachim (2016). Lending to the Borrower from Hell: Debt, Taxes, and Default in the Age of Philip II. Princeton: Princeton University Press. ISBN 9780691151496.
- Elliott, J. H. (2002). Imperial Spain: 1469–1716. London: Penguin. ISBN 9780141007038.
- Elliott, John H. "The decline of Spain". Past & Present 20 (1961): 52–75.
- Goodman, David (1983). "Philip II's Patronage of Science and Engineering". British Journal for the History of Science. 16 (1): 49–66. doi:10.1017/S000708740001952X.
- Grierson, Edward (1969). The Fatal Inheritance: Philip II and the Spanish Netherlands. Garden: Doubleday. OCLC 1046309486.
- Gwynn, Aubrey (1933). "A Catholic King: Philip II of Spain". Studies: An Irish Quarterly Review. 22 (85): 48–64. JSTOR 30094971.
- Henriques, Antonio; Palma, Nuno Pedro G. (2019). "Comparative European Institutions and the Little Divergence, 1385–1800" (PDF). Archived from the original (PDF) on 19 July 2020.
- Hume, M. A. S. (1897). Philip II of Spain. Foreign statesmen. London: Macmillan.
- Israel, Jonathan. "King Philip II of Spain as a symbol of 'Tyranny'". Co-herencia 15.28 (2018): 137–154.
- Kagan, Richard L. (1986). "Philip II and the Art of the Cityscape". Journal of Interdisciplinary History. 17 (1): 115–135. doi:10.2307/204127. JSTOR 204127.
- Kamen, Henry (1999). Philip of Spain. New Haven: Yale University Press. ISBN 9780300078008.
- Kelsey, Harry (2011). Philip of Spain, King of England: The Forgotten Sovereign. London: I.B. Tauris. ISBN 9781848857162.
- Koenigsberger, H. G. (1971). The Habsburgs and Europe, 1516–1660. Ithaca: Cornell University Press. OCLC 721312525.
- Lazure, Guy (2007). "Possessing the Sacred: Monarchy and Identity in Philip II's Relic Collection at the Escorial". Renaissance Quarterly. 60 (1): 58–93. doi:10.1353/ren.2007.0076.
- López, Anna Santamaría. "'Great Faith is Necessary to Drink from this Chalice': Philip II in the Court of Mary Tudor, 1554–58". Early Modern Dynastic Marriages and Cultural Transfer, ed. by Joan-Lluis Palos and Magdalena S. Sanchez (2017) pp. 115–138.
- Lynch, John (1981). Empire and Absolutism: 1516–1598. Spain Under the Habsburgs. Vol. I. Oxford: Blackwell. OCLC 928663276.
- Lynch, John (1961). "Philip II and the Papacy". Transactions of the Royal Historical Society. 11: 23–42. doi:10.2307/3678749. JSTOR 3678749.
- Martinic, Mateo (1977). Historia del Estrecho de Magallanes (in Spanish). Santiago: Andrés Bello. OCLC 5414474.
- Matthews, P. G. (2000). "Portraits of Philip II of Spain as King of England". Burlington Magazine. 142 (1162): 13–19. JSTOR 888764.
- Merriman, R. B. The Rise of the Spanish Empire in the Old World and in the New (4 vols., 1918). Vol. 4 has in-depth coverage of Philip II.
- Miller, Stephanie R. (2012). "A Tale of Two Portraits: Titian's Seated Portraits of Philip II". Visual Resources. 28 (1): 103–116. doi:10.1080/01973762.2012.653485.
- Parker, Geoffrey (2014). Imprudent King: A New Life of Philip II. New Haven: Yale University Press. ISBN 9780300216950.
- Parker, Geoffrey (1998). The Grand Strategy of Philip II. New Haven: Yale University Press. ISBN 9780300075403.
- Parker, Geoffrey. Philip II (1995), short scholarly biography
- Parker, Geoffrey (2001). The World is Not Enough: The Imperial Vision of Philip II of Spain. Waco: Baylor University Press. ISBN 9780918954770.
- Parker, Geoffrey (2002). "The Place of Tudor England in the Messianic Vision of Philip II of Spain". Transactions of the Royal Historical Society. 12: 167–221. doi:10.1017/S0080440102000063. JSTOR 3679344.
- Patterson, Benton Rain (2012). With the Heart of a King: Elizabeth I of England, Philip II of Spain & the Fight for a Nation's Soul & Crown. New York: St. Martin's Press. ISBN 9781466858848.
- Petrie, Charles (1964). Philip II of Spain. London: Eyre & Spottiswoode. OCLC 313167911.
- Pettegree, Andrew (2002). Europe in the Sixteenth Century. Oxford, England: Blackwell. ISBN 0-631-20704-X..
- Pierson, Peter (1975). Philip II of Spain. London: Thames & Hudson. OCLC 253737198.
- Prescott, William Hickling (1855–1902). A History of the Reign of Philip II. London, Boston, Philadelphia: George Routledge & Co.
- Rady, Martyn (2020). The Habsburgs: To Rule the World. New York: Basic Books, ch. 8, pp. 85-95: "Philip II: The New World, Religious Dissent, and Royal Incest". ISBN 978-1-5416-4450-2
- Redworth, Glyn. "Philip (1527–1598)", Oxford Dictionary of National Biography, online edition, May 2011. Retrieved 25 August 2011.
- Rodriguez-Salgado, M. J. (1991). The Court of Philip II of Spain. Princes, Patronage, and the Nobility: The Court at the Beginning of the Modern Age, cc. 1450–1650. Edited by Ronald G. Asch and Adolf M. Birke. Oxford University Press. ISBN 0-19-920502-7.
- Samson, Alexander (2020). Mary and Philip: The Marriage of Tudor England and Habsburg Spain. Manchester: Manchester University Press. ISBN 9781526160249.
- Samson, Alexander (2010). Alice Hunt, Anna Whitelock (ed.). Power Sharing: The Co-monarchy of Philip and Mary". Tudor Queenship: The Reigns of Mary and Elizabeth'. New York: Palgrave Macmillan. pp. 159–172. ISBN 9781349380930.
- Samson, Alexander. "Changing Places: The Marriage and Royal Entry of Philip, Prince of Austria, and Mary Tudor, July-August 1554". Sixteenth Century Journal (2005): 761–784.
- Scully, Robert E. "'In the Confident Hope of a Miracle': The Spanish Armada and Religious Mentalities in the Late Sixteenth Century". Catholic Historical Review 89.4 (2003): 643–670.
- Thomas, Hugh (2014). World Without End: The Global Empire of Philip II. London: Penguin. ISBN 9780141034478.
- Waxman, Matthew C. (1997). "Strategic Terror: Philip II and Sixteenth-Century Warfare". War in History. 4 (3): 339–347. doi:10.1177/096834459700400305. JSTOR 26004392.
- Wilbur, Marguerite Eyer (1956). The Unquenchable Flame: The Life of Philip II. P. Owen. OCLC 7343383.
- Wilkinson-Zerner, Catherine (1993). Juan de Herrera: Architect to Philip II of Spain. New Haven: Yale University Press. ISBN 9780300049916.
- Williams, Patrick (2001). Philip II. Houndmills: Palgrave. ISBN 9780333630426.

Philip II of Spain House of Habsburg Born: 21 May 1527 Died: 13 September 1598
Regnal titles
Preceded by Mary I as sole monarch	King of England and Ireland (jure uxoris); 25 July 1554 – 17 November 1558	Succeeded by Elizabeth I
Preceded by Emperor Charles V	Duke of Brabant, Limburg, Lothier and Luxemburg; Marquis of Namur; Count Palatine of Burgundy; Count of Artois, Flanders and Hainaut; 16 January 1556 – 6 May 1598	Succeeded by Isabella Clara Eugenia; Albert
Preceded by Emperor Charles V	Count of Charolais; 21 September 1558 – 6 May 1598	Succeeded by Isabella Clara Eugenia; Albert
Preceded by Emperor Charles V	Duke of Guelders; Count of Zutphen, Holland and Zeeland; 16 January 1556 – 26 July 1581	Dutch Republic
Preceded by Emperor Charles V	King of Naples and Sicily; 1554–1598	Succeeded by Philip III
Preceded by Emperor Charles V	King of Spain and Sardinia; 1556–1598	Succeeded by Philip III
Preceded by Henry	King of Portugal; 1581–1598	Succeeded by Philip III
Vacant Title last held by Francesco II Sforza	Duke of Milan; 1540–1598	Succeeded by Philip III
Spanish royalty
Vacant Title last held by Charles I	Prince of Asturias; 1528–1556	Succeeded by Carlos
Vacant Title last held by Charles I	Prince of Girona; 1527–1556	Succeeded by Carlos
