= Palacio de Pimentel =

Cultural property in Valladolid, Spain

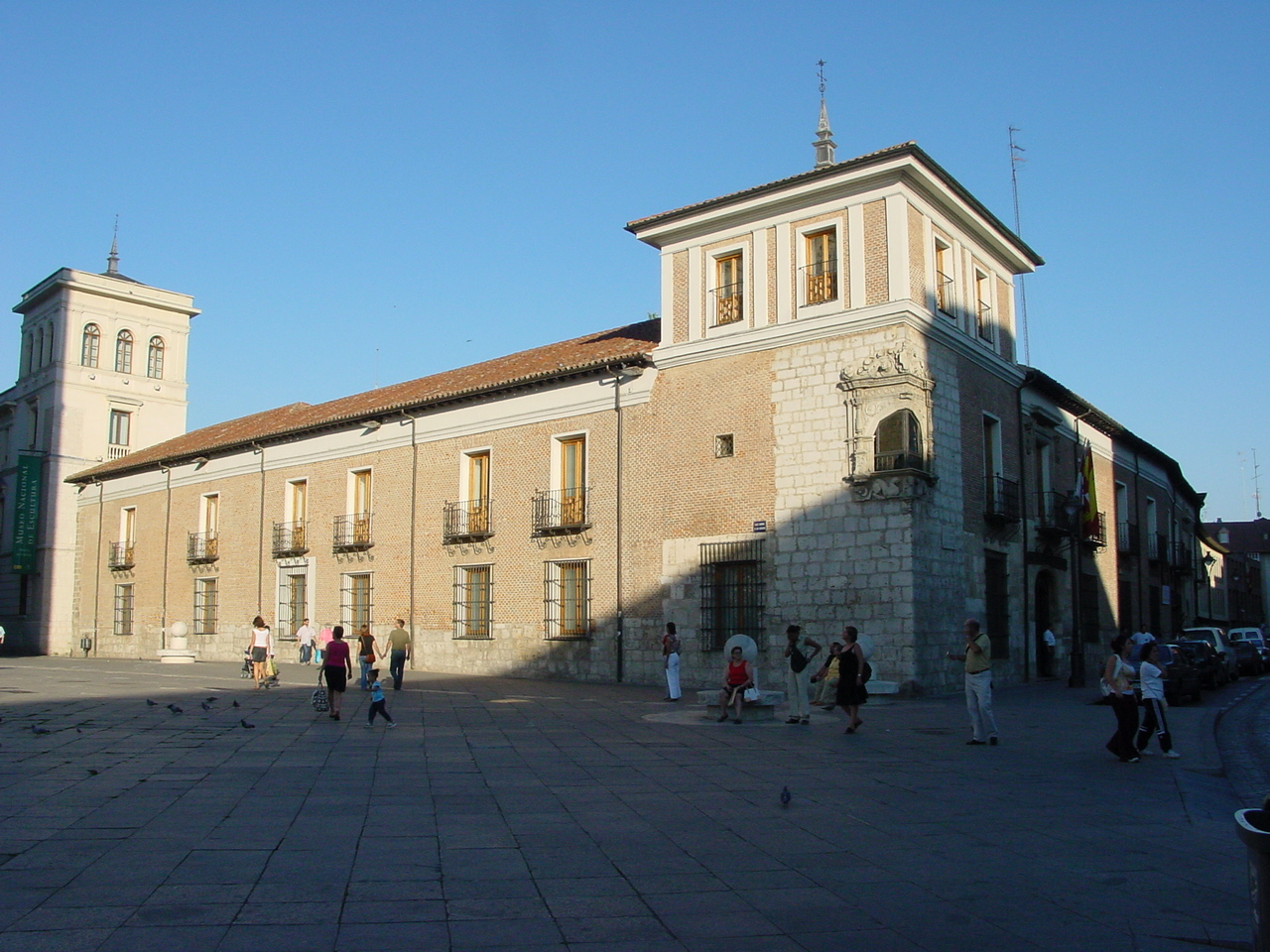
View of Palacio de Pimentel

Palacio de Pimentel (Pimentel Palace) is a former royal palace in the city of Valladolid in Castilla y León, Spain. It is located on the Plaza de San Pablo and is one of a number of palaces in Valladolid. It currently serves as the headquarters of the Valladolid Provincial Council (Diputación de Valladolid).

Also known as Palacio de los Condes de Ribadavia, the building in the Renaissance style was constructed in the 15th century incorporating earlier structures. It was the birthplace of King Philip II of Spain.

From 1985 to 1990 the palace was restored to serve as local government offices including a public exhibition space.

It is a monument indexed in the Spanish heritage register of Bienes de Interés Cultural under the reference RI-51-0010187 and a protected monument of the government of Castile and León.

== See also ==
- List of Bienes de Interés Cultural in the Province of Valladolid
- Plaza de San Pablo (Valladolid)
- Palacio de Santa Cruz
- Palacio Real de Valladolid
- Palacio de Villena (Valladolid)
