= Eufrasia de Guzmán =

Spanish courtier

- Princess of Ascoli
- Born: Eufrasia Guzmán; 16th century Madrid
- Died: August 7, 1604; Madrid, Crown of Castile
- Spouse: Luis de Leiva, III príncipe de Áscoli
- Issue: Illegitimate son
- Father: Gonzalo Franco de Guzmán
- Mother: Marina Porres
- Occupation: Lady-in-waiting

Eufrasia de Guzmán (fl. 1592) was a Spanish courtier. She was the long-term royal mistress of King Philip II of Spain.

She was the lady-in-waiting of Joanna of Austria, Princess of Portugal from 1550. She was the mistress of Philip in 1559–1564, when the king waited for his wife Elizabeth of Valois to be old enough to sexually consummate their marriage.

She had a son with Philip in 1564, after which Philip arranged a marriage for her (to a prince of Ascoli) and terminated the relationship.
