= Grand Master of the Order of the Golden Fleece =

Leader of a Catholic order of chivalry

The sovereign or grand master is the head of the Order of the Golden Fleece. Prior to the Napoleonic Wars the Grand Master was always identical with the monarch controlling the Spanish or Austrian Netherlands, although afterwards the order split into separate Austrian and Spanish branches.

The present grand master of the Austrian order is Karl von Habsburg; that of the Spanish order is the Felipe VI of Spain.

== List of grand masters ==
=== Burgundian Golden Fleece ===
- Philip the Good, Duke of Burgundy
- Charles the Bold, Duke of Burgundy

=== Habsburg Golden Fleece ===
- Maximilian I, Holy Roman Emperor
- Philip I of Castile
- Charles V, Holy Roman Emperor
- Philip II of Spain
- Philip III of Spain
- Philip IV of Spain
- Charles II of Spain

=== Austrian Golden Fleece ===
- Leopold I, Holy Roman Emperor
- Joseph I, Holy Roman Emperor
- Charles VI, Holy Roman Emperor
- Francis I, Holy Roman Emperor
- Joseph II, Holy Roman Emperor
- Leopold II, Holy Roman Emperor
- Francis II, Holy Roman Emperor, later Francis I, Emperor of Austria
- Ferdinand I of Austria
- Franz Joseph I of Austria
- Charles I of Austria
- Otto von Habsburg
- Karl von Habsburg

== See also ==
- List of knights of the Golden Fleece
