= Peñón de Vélez de la Gomera expedition =

Peñón de Vélez de la Gomera expedition may refer to:

- Conquest of the Peñón de Vélez de la Gomera (1508), first Spanish expedition
- Conquest of the Peñón de Vélez de la Gomera (1522), Moroccan conquest
- Peñón de Vélez de la Gomera expedition (1525), Spanish expedition defeated by the Moroccans
- Battle of the Bay of Velez (1553), Algerine victory over Portugal
- Conquest of the Peñón de Vélez de la Gomera (1554), Algerine victory over Morocco
- Peñón de Vélez de la Gomera expedition (1563), Spanish expedition defeated by the Ottomans
- Conquest of the Peñón de Vélez de la Gomera (1564), Spanish reconquest in 1564
- Siege of Peñón de Vélez (1702), unsuccessful Moroccan siege
