= Álvaro de Bazán, Marquis of Santa Cruz =

16th-century Spanish admiral

Marquis of Santa Cruz
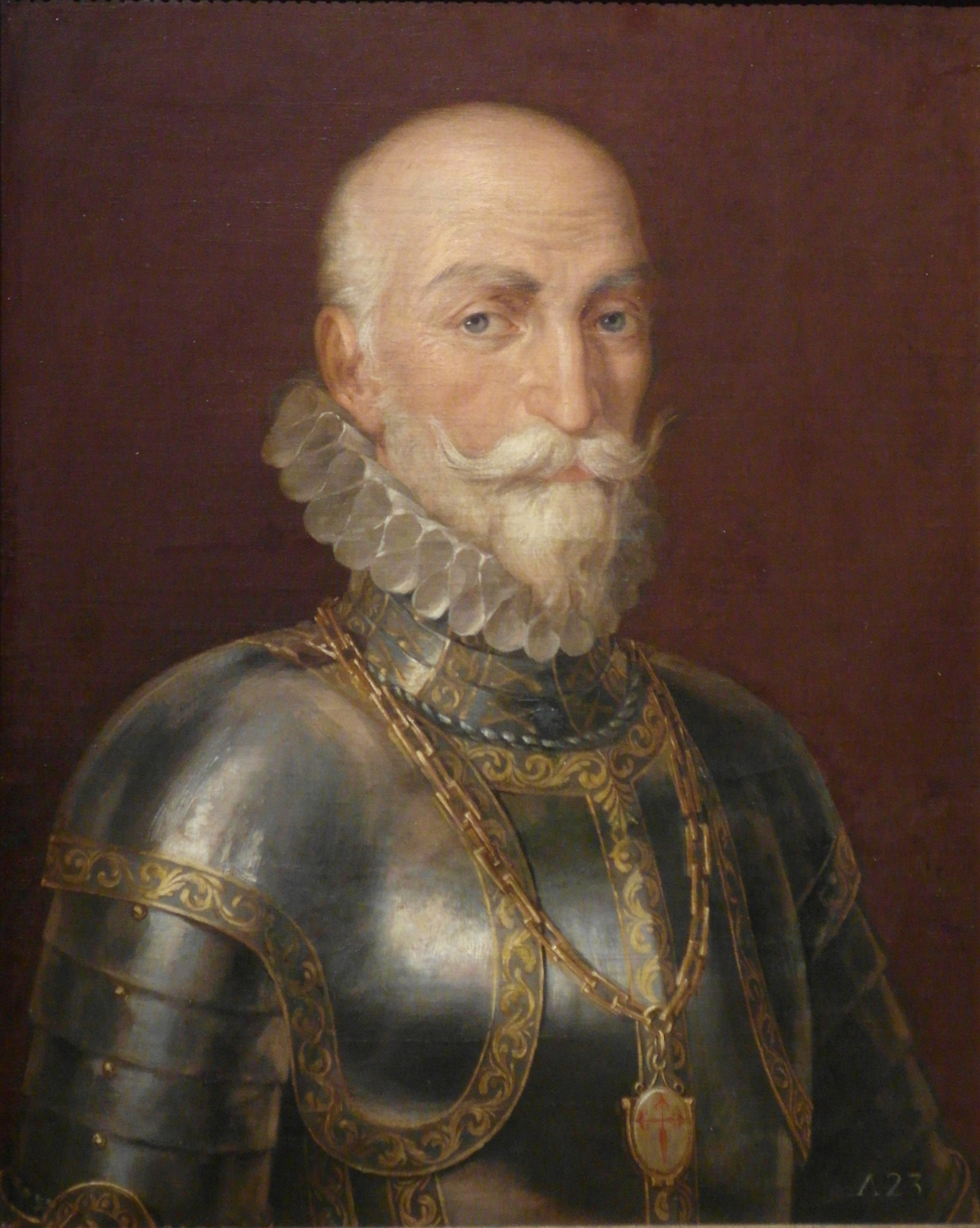
- Born: 12 December 1526; Granada, Castile
- Died: 9 February 1588 (aged 61); Lisbon, Portugal
- Burial place: Viso del Marqués
- Military career
- Allegiance: Spanish Empire
- Branch: Spanish Navy
- Service years: 1544–1588
- Rank: Captain General of the Sea; General Admiral
- Conflicts: Italian War of 1542–1546; Battle of Muros Bay; Ottoman–Habsburg wars; Sieges of Oran and Mers El Kébir; Peñón de Vélez de la Gomera expedition; Conquest of Peñón de Vélez de la Gomera; Blockade of the Tetuan river; Siege of Malta; Battle of Lepanto; Siege of Navarino; Conquest of Tunis; Anglo-Spanish wars; Battle of Gibraltar; Drake's 1587 expedition (no direct combat); War of the Portuguese Succession; Battle of Ponta Delgada; Conquest of the Azores

Álvaro de Bazán y Guzmán, 1st Marquis of Santa Cruz (12 December 1526 – 9 February 1588), was a Spanish admiral and nobleman. He took part, among others, in the seizure of the rock of Vélez de la Gomera (1564), the relief to the besieged during the sieges of Oran (1563) and Malta (1565), the Battle of Lepanto (1571), the conquest of Tunis (1573), the incorporation of Portugal to the Spanish monarchy (1580), and the conquest of Terceira (1582).

A leading admiral in both the Mediterranean and the Atlantic, like his father before him, Bazán has been considered the prime naval commander in the history of Spain. He made developments in amphibious warfare and pioneered the strategic usage of several kinds of ships, refining the design of existent vessels and popularising galleons as warships, ultimately making possible many of the successes of the Spanish Empire since the 16th and 17th centuries. For his leadership and influence, Bazán was celebrated by Miguel de Cervantes as el Padre de los Soldados ("the Father of the Soldiers"). He was reputed to have never lost a battle under his command, a remarkable achievement in a fifty-year-long military career.

He was a grandee of Spain and a patron of the arts. He built the Palace of the Marquis of Santa Cruz in Viso, Spain, which currently houses the General Archive of the Spanish Navy.

== Biography ==
Álvaro de Bazán y Guzmán was born in Granada on 12 December 1526, son to Álvaro de Bazán y Solís "the Elder" and Ana de Guzmán. Just like his father and grandfather, he was a member of the Order of Santiago, having joined the order as a knight when he was a toddler, in 1529. Under the purview of his relationship with the order, he was granted encomiendas in Villamayor (1568) and in Alhambra and La Solana (1572).

His grandfather, Álvaro de Bazán, took part in the conquest of Granada in 1492. Bazán's father took part together with Giovanni Andrea Doria and others marines in the recapture of Tunis in 1535, and was distinguished in the service of Charles V, by whom he was made general of the galleys, or commander-in-chief of the Spanish naval forces in the Mediterranean.

The future admiral followed his father into the navy in his youth and was employed in the high command of the Spanish officers at a very early age. At the age of eight, he was appointed "Military Governor and captain of the fortress and city of Gibraltar". His 'command' was via his father, who was in command of the galleys of Spain. It has been speculated that this unusual appointment was intended to show Charles V's confidence, but the commander of the galleys did not share that confidence. Bazán the Elder suggested to no effect that Gibraltar's Line Wall Curtain be extended to the southern tip of the rock. In 1564, he aided in the capture of Peñón de Vélez de la Gomera and, the following year, he commanded the division of galleys employed to blockade Tetuan and to suppress the piracy carried on from that port. The service is said to have been successfully performed.

The younger Bazán had a first showing serving under Sancho Martínez de Leyva during his failed expedition to the Peñón de Vélez de la Gomera. Bazán advised Leyva for a course of action that went unheeded, leading to a fiasco, during which Bazán was still instrumental in covering the Spanish retreat from his ships. He later defeated an English pirate fleet in Gibraltar. Bazán participated again in the next expedition to Vélez de la Gomera, leading to its final conquest. Actions like this earned the confidence of Philip II, by whom he was appointed in 1568 to command the galleys of Naples. This post brought him into close relations with John of Austria, when the Holy League was formed against the Turks in 1570.

He was given the title of Marquis of Santa Cruz in 1569, in light of his role in the suffocation of the Morisco Revolt and previous services. The title was named after Santa Cruz de Mudela, acquired from the Crown by his father back in 1539.

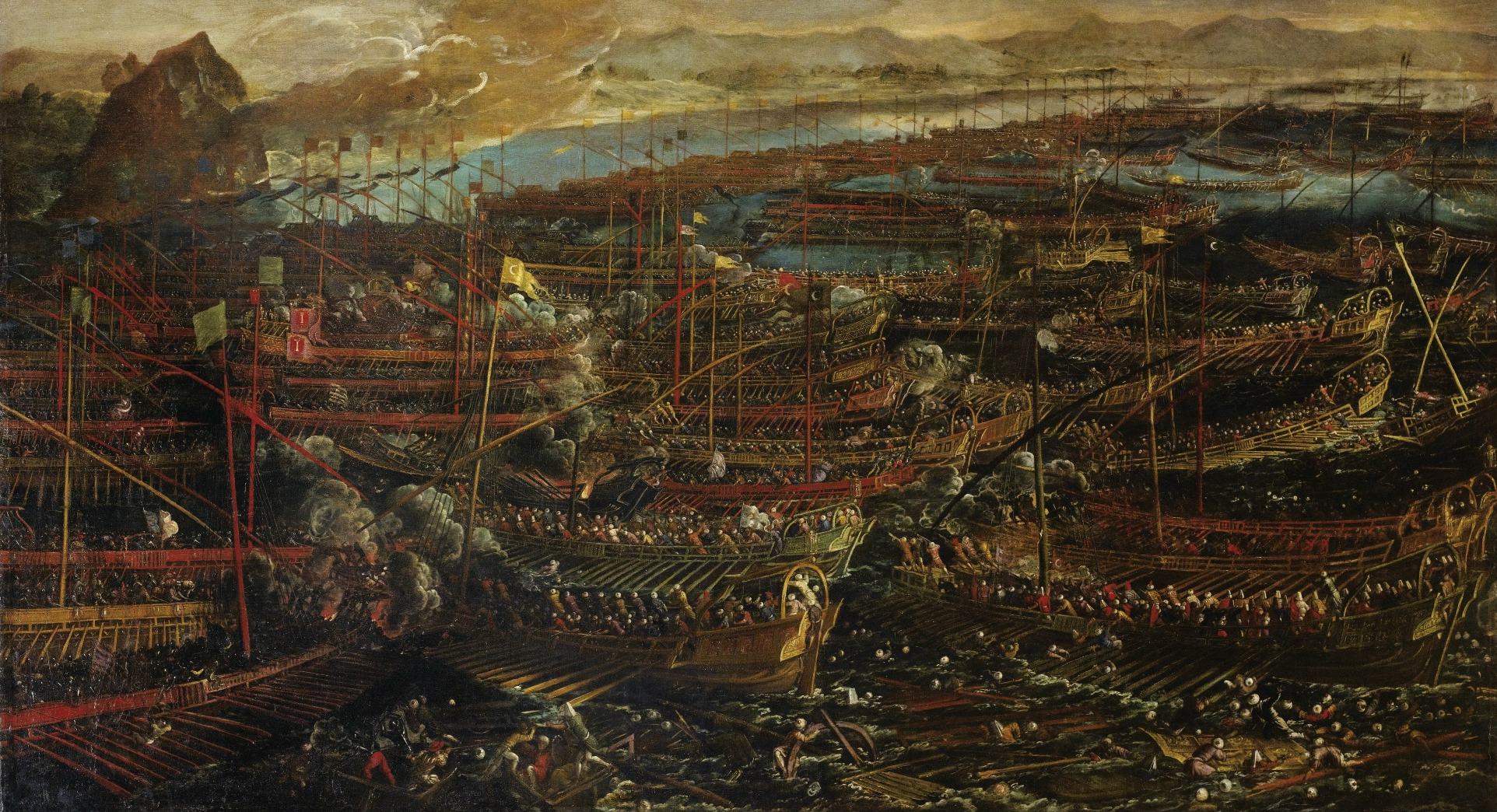
Depiction of the Battle of Lepanto by Tintoretto

During the operations which preceded and followed the Battle of Lepanto (7 October 1571), Bazán was always in favour of the more energetic course. His personal galley was known as La Loba ('The She-Wolf'), after her golden figurehead. In the battle, he commanded the reserve division, and his prompt energy averted a disaster when Uluj Ali, who commanded the left wing of the Turks, outmaneuvered the commander of the Christian right, Gian Andrea Doria, the nephew of his old comrade Andrea Doria, and broke the Allied line. He later accompanied Don John of Austria at the taking of Tunis in the following year.

When Philip II enforced his claim as heir to the crown of Portugal in 1580–1581, Santa Cruz held a naval command but António, Prior of Crato, an illegitimate representative of the former Portuguese royal family, who conducted some popular resistance to the crowning of what was seen as a foreign king, continued to hold the islands of the Azores. António was supported by a number of French adventurers under Philip Strozzi, a Florentine exile in the service of France. Santa Cruz was sent as "Admiral of the Ocean" to drive the pretender and his friends away in 1582.

Badly outnumbered, he won the Battle of Ponta Delgada off Terceira Island against a loose confederation of Portuguese, French, English and Dutch adventurers and privateers, which decided the struggle for the Azores in favour of the Spanish Habsburgs.

Santa Cruz, who recognised that England presented a grave threat to Spain's empire, became a zealous advocate of war. A letter written by him to King Philip from Angra do Heroísmo in Terceira, on 9 August 1583, contains the first definite suggestion of the Spanish Armada. His proposed plan included striking first in Ireland and mounting a local rebellion, in a way that would divert the English forces, before heading for the channel to start the main invasion of England.

Santa Cruz was to have commanded the fleet. His plans, schemes and estimates occupy a conspicuous place in the documents concerning the Armada collected by Cesáreo Fernández Duro. The hesitant character of the king, and his many embarrassments, political and financial, caused many delays and left Santa Cruz unable to take action. He was at Lisbon without the means to fit out his fleet, when Francis Drake burnt the Spanish ships at Cádiz during his 1587 expedition. The king was offended by Santa Cruz's independence of judgement, and he held the admiral responsible for the failures and delays, although these are better attributed to the Crown. Santa Cruz died on 9 February 1588 at Lisbon, reportedly in part because of the unjustified reproaches of the king.

The great galleons employed to carry the trade between Cádiz and Vera Cruz in New Spain were the joint creation of Santa Cruz and Pedro Menéndez de Avilés.

== Legacy and popular culture ==
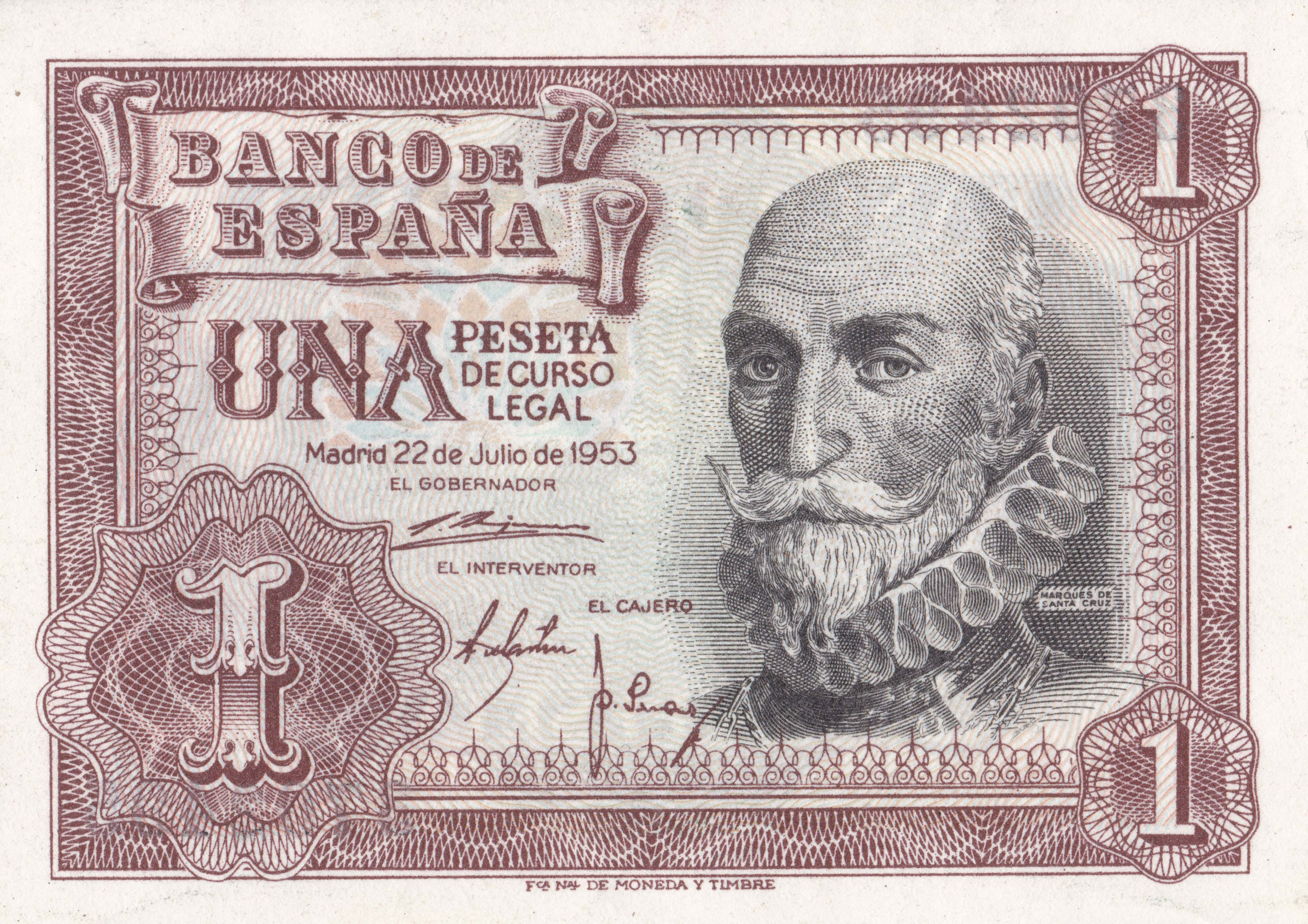
Marquess of Santa Cruz on the 1953 one-peseta banknote

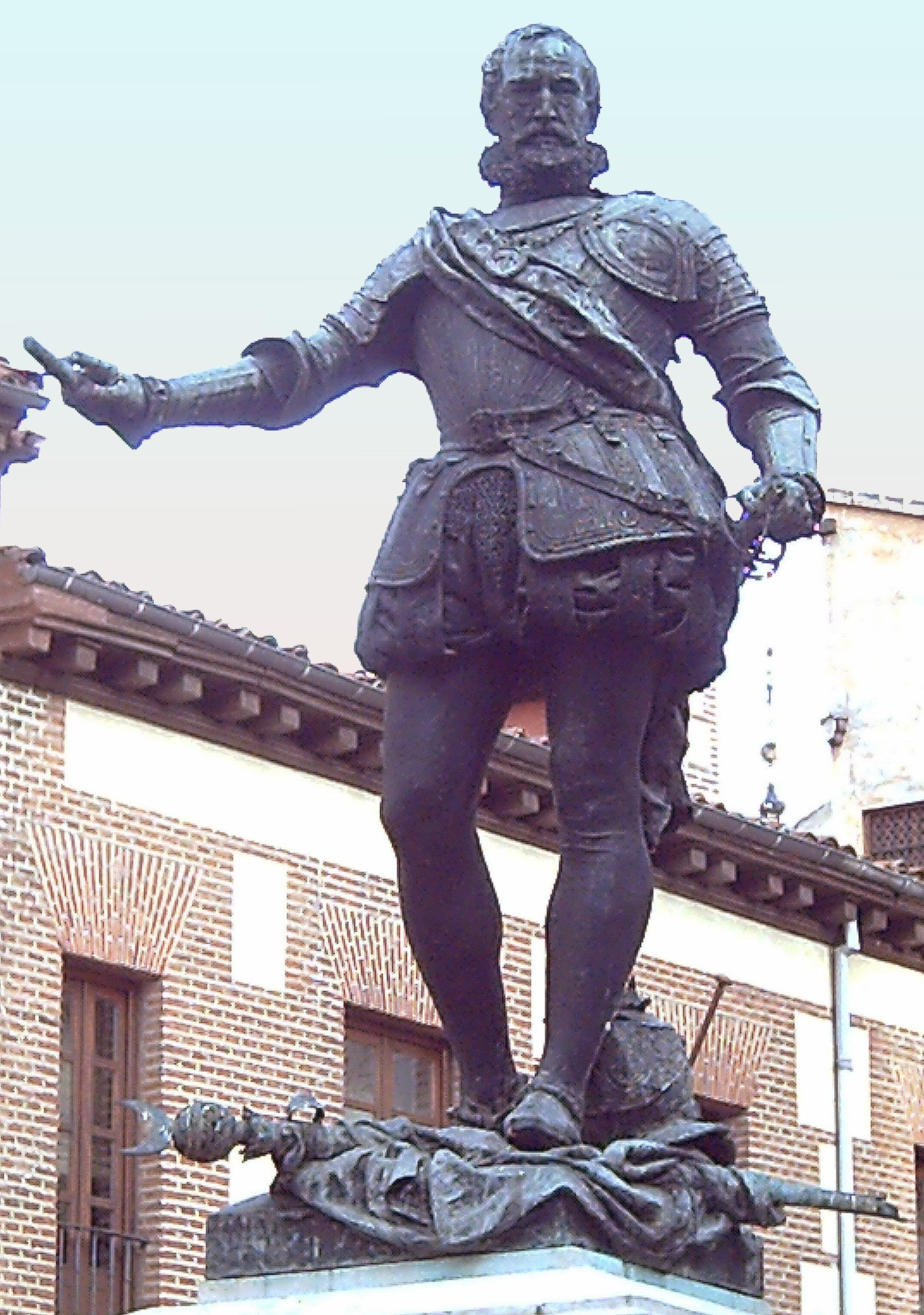
Statue in Madrid (Mariano Benlliure, 1891)

The documents relating to the Spanish Armada have been collected by Cesáreo Fernández Duro in La Armada Invencible (1895–1903), and he gives a biography of the Santa Cruz in his Conquista de las Islas Azores. A separate life has been published by Don Ángel de Altolaguirre. There are various notices of Santa Cruz in Sir W. Stirling Maxwell's Don John of Austria.

Several ships of the Spanish Navy were named Álvaro de Bazán in his honour. Currently, a class of frigates is in service with the Spanish Navy, and the lead ship is named Álvaro de Bazán (F101).

He was depicted on the 1953 one-peseta banknote.

In the Chapter XXXIX of Don Quixote, Cervantes says: Tomóla la capitana de Nápoles, llamada La Loba, regida por aquel rayo de la guerra, por el padre de los soldados, por aquel venturoso y jamás vencido capitán don Álvaro de Bazán, marqués de Santa Cruz. ("She was taken by the Captain of the Naples-galleys, called La Loba (The She-Wolf), commanded by that lightning of war, by the father of soldiers, for that fortunate and never defeated captain, Don Álvaro de Bazán, marquess of Santa Cruz.")

In the episode "The Enterprise of England" in the 1971 BBC series Elizabeth R, he is portrayed by Geoffrey Wincott in a historically accurate script, in which King Philip's meddling clearly dooms his plans and exacerbates his declining health.
