= Conquest of the Peñón de Vélez de la Gomera (1554) =

In 1554, the Peñón de Vélez de la Gomera was conquered by the regency of Algiers.

First conquered by Spain in 1508, the Peñón de Vélez de la Gomera had been recovered in 1522 by the Wattasids. A Spanish attempt at reconquest failed in 1525. They made no further effort to acquire the strategic location before 1564. In 1550, the Wattasid ruler Ali Abu Hassun was forced into exile in Spain and the Peñón came under the rule of the Saadians. Their dominion was short-lived. In 1554, the Peñón was conquered by Algiers. In 1564, Spain reconquered the Peñón.
