= Battle of Monastir (1540) =

- Part of Hafsid-Shabiyan War
Date	November 12, 1540
Location	Ouerdanin
Result	Shabiyan victory

Belligerents
Emirate of Shabiyah	Hafsid dynasty Spanish Empire

Commanders and leaders
Ahmed Ben Arafa; Muhammad al-Zafzaf; Muhammad Ben Abi Al Tayyib; Cachazo	Abu Abdallah Muhammad V al-Hasan; Spanish Empire Álvaro de Sande; Spanish Empire Louis de Regón; Spanish Empire Gaspard Muñoz

Strength
22 000 cavaliers 15,000 infantrymen 600 firearms carriers	60,000 soldiers Spanish Empire 2,000 soldiers

Casualties and losses
Unknown	6 killed Spanish Empire Heavy

In 1539, Andrea Doria succeeded in recapturing the cities of Kelibia, Sousse, Monastir, and Sfax on behalf of the Hafsid prince. However, Kairouan remained in open revolt, and the Hafsid ruler sought to avenge his earlier defeat at the hands of the Chabbia tribes.

== The battle ==
Initially, on the outskirts of Monastir, all the Moors serving in the Hafsid sultan’s army betrayed him and joined the enemy forces. As a result, the sultan was forced to retreat and regroup with a Spanish battalion, as he was left with only 2,000 soldiers. He later returned at the head of an army of 60,000 men, composed mainly of Arab tribesmen and supported by 2,000 Spanish troops under the command of Álvaro de Sande. The remainder of the Spanish forces were stationed in Monastir under the command of Gaspard Muñoz.

The Spanish launched an offensive toward Monastir but were halted near Batn-el-Karn. The Hafsid king fell into an ambush and fled to Sousse. Meanwhile, the Spanish forces attempted to retreat toward Monastir, but the rearguard, commanded by Louis de Regón, became bogged down in the Sabkha and was annihilated.

== Aftermath ==
Following the battle, the Spanish forces withdrew from Monastir. Almost immediately, the cities that had previously been pacified by the Spanish rose in revolt and placed themselves under the protection of Dragut.
