= Anglo-Spanish War =

Anglo-Spanish War may refer to:

- Alfonso VIII's invasion of Gascony (1205–1207 or 1208)
- Hundred Years' War (1337–1453), includes the War of the Breton Succession, the Castilian Civil War, the War of the Two Peters, and the 1383–1385 Portuguese interregnum and John of Gaunt's claims to the Castilian throne
- Third Fernandine War (1381–1382)
- Battle of Gibraltar (1563)
- Eighty Year's War (1566–1648)
- Battle of San Juan de Ulúa (1568)
- Francis Drake's expedition of 1572–1573
- Francis Drake's circumnavigation
- Second Desmond Rebellion (1579–1583), part of the Desmond rebellions
- Battle of São Vicente (1583)
- Anglo-Spanish War (1585–1604), including the Spanish Armada, the English Armada and the Nine Years' War (Ireland) and the French Wars of Religion, part of the Eighty Years' War
- Dutch–Portuguese War (1601–1661), part of the Eighty Years' War
- Uskok War (1615–1617)
- Palatinate campaign (1620–1623), part of the Thirty Years' War
- Anglo-Spanish War (1625–1630), part of the Thirty Years' War (Eighty Years' War, 1621–1648)
- Anglo-Spanish War (1654–1660), part of the Franco-Spanish War
- Caribbean War (1660–71), follow on from previous war, based in Caribbean.
- Portuguese Restoration War (1662–1668), English support for Portugal
- War of the Spanish Succession (1701–1713), British support to Archduke Charles
- War of the Quadruple Alliance (1718–1720)
- Anglo-Spanish War (1727–1729)
- War of Jenkins' Ear (1739–1748), later merged into the War of the Austrian Succession
- Anglo-Spanish War (1762–1763), part of the Seven Years' War
- Anglo-Spanish War (1779–1783), linked to the American Revolutionary War
- Anglo-Spanish War (1796–1808), part of the French Revolutionary and Napoleonic Wars
- The Spanish American wars of independence (1815–1819), British supporting role to the decolonization of the Americas
- First Carlist War (1833–1840), British support to Queen Isabella II against Carlists

== See also ==
- Falklands Crisis of 1770
- Nootka Crisis
- Turbot War
