= Peñón de Vélez de la Gomera expedition (1563) =

Spanish military expedition

- Part of Spanish–Ottoman wars
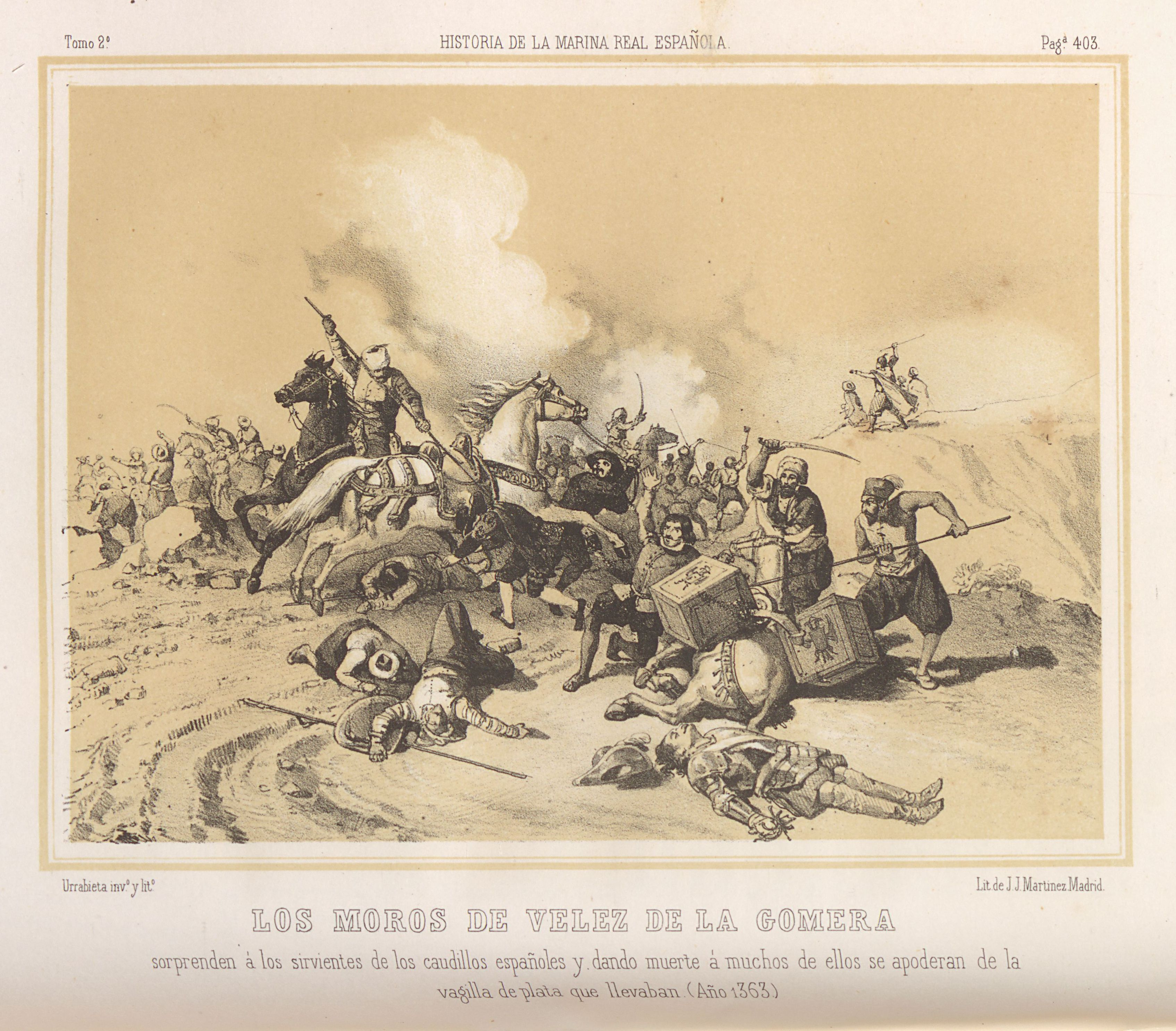
- The defeat of Spanish troops in Peñón de Vélez de la Gomera
Date	23 July – 2 August 1563
Location	Peñón de Vélez de la Gomera
Result	Ottoman victory

Belligerents
(Spain) Spanish Empire	Ottoman Empire; Gomera Berbers

Commanders and leaders
(Spain) Sancho de Leyva (Spain) Pedro de Venegas (Spain) Álvaro de Bazán	Unknown

Strength
7,000 men 50 galleys	Unknown

Casualties and losses
Heavy	Unknown

In 1563, a Spanish military expedition was launched to reconquer the exclave of Peñón de Vélez de la Gomera, which was under the control of the Ottomans. The campaign ended in a fiasco for the Spanish troops.

== Background ==
In 1522, Spain lost the peñón to a Moroccan Berber attack that resulted in the deaths of the entire Spanish garrison. Ali Abu Hassun, the new Wattasid ruler of Morocco in 1554, then gave the peñón to the Ottoman troops who had assisted him in gaining the throne. In 1525, the Spanish made an attempt to recover the islet but were defeated. After the victory at Oran, king Philip II of Spain decided to take advantage by launching a counter strike against Barbary haven, which is Peñón de Vélez de la Gomera.

== Expedition ==
In 1563, Spanish governor of Melilla, Pedro Venegas, prepared another campaign against Peñón de Vélez de la Gomera. The command was given to Don Sancho de Leyva, nephew to Antonio de Leyva. The Spanish prepared an armada of 50 galleys and 7,000 men. He had fifty volunteers, accompanied by the eighth galleys of Álvaro de Bazán. The Spanish armada left Málaga on July 23. At Peñón, Sancho unveiled the plan made by Venegas, scaling the walls at night, which the counsel unanimously deemed impossible, yet they decided to carry on anyway.

The expeditioners proceeded to the assault, but were spotted after someone made a noise which alarmed the garrison into firing their cannons. Despite this failure, Sancho was unwilling and landed between 4,000 and 5,000 men six miles away from the rock in an attempt to capture it by land. He carried with him a large retinue of servants with luxury food whom, alarmed by the first contacts, fled to the coast, where local Berber bandits stole their goods. However, the night assault again ended in failure as the defenders were alarmed. The Spanish fleet attempted to cover their retreat with cannonfire, but Bazán called to stop upon realizing their bad position would make them hit their own troops. Ottoman galleys appeared to support the garrison, so the Spanish galleys gave them chase, without success.

The fruitlessness of the campaign frustrated Leyva, who held a council. The majority agreed to withdraw, except Bazán, who argued for the continuation of the campaign. He noted the enemy garrison was undersupplied and would be easy to submit, yet if the Spanish retreated, this would only give the locals the chance to resist better a future attempt. He also proposed tactical ideas for another assault, having found openings in the enemy defense. However, Sancho ordered the troops to reembark.

The Spanish troops began leaving, but during their retreat, the Ottoman garrison and the Gomera Berbers attacked them with their artillery, inflicting heavy losses on the Spanish. Again, Bazán moved to protect the withdrawal, turning out instrumental to secure it. The Muslims had acquired great loot that the Spanish left. The Spanish returned to Malaga on August 2.

== Aftermath ==
The operation's result displeased King Philip II, but he took it in stride. Leyva was ordered to return to Naples and spent the winter there, while Bazán returned to the fortress of Gibraltar, where he defeated an English pirate fleet which had attempted to capitalize on the chance to attack French merchant trade.

== Sources ==
- Agustín R. Rodríguez González (2017), Álvaro de Bazán, Capitán general del Mar Océano.
- E. Leroux (1905), Les Sources inédites de l'histoire du Maroc de 1530 à 1845.
- Francisco Feliu de la Peña (1846), Historical-political-military-administrative-religious legend of the Peñon de Velez de la Gomera.
- Cesáreo Fernández Duro (1851), La Armada Española desde la unión de los reinos de Castilla y Aragón.
- Roger Bigelow Merriman (1934), The Rise of the Spanish Empire in the Old World and in the New, Vol IV, Philip the Prudent.
