= Sieges of Oran and Mers El Kébir =

1563 siege in North Africa

- Part of the Ottoman-Habsburg wars
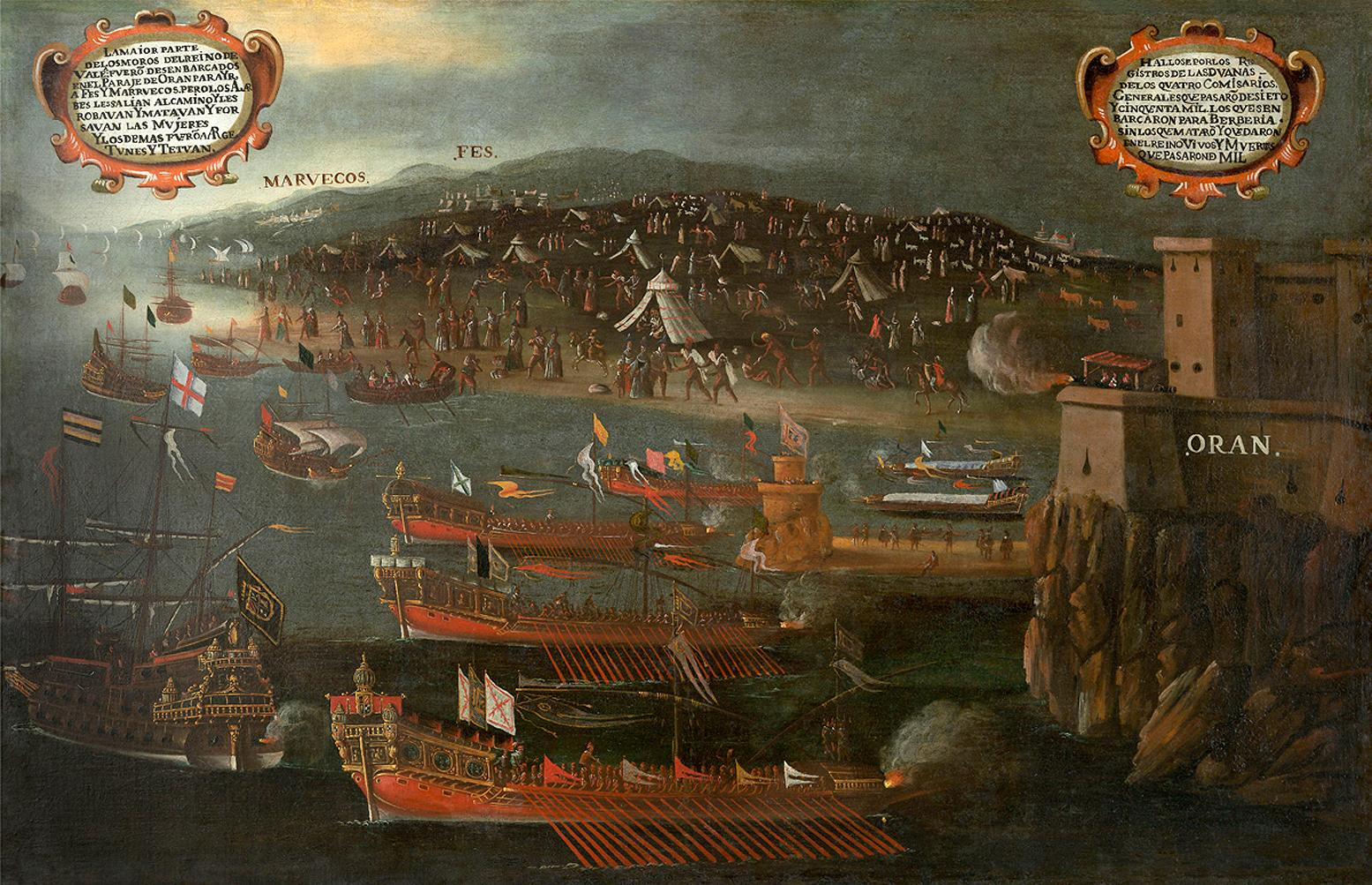
- Oran's harbour. Painting of 1613 by Vicente Mestre.
Date	April – June 1563
Location	Oran and Mers El Kébir, Algeria
Result	Spanish victory: Spanish forces keep the fort until Algerian forces retreat after arrival of Spanish naval reinforcements.

Belligerents
(Spain) Spanish Empire	Regency of Algiers; Ottoman Tripolitania; Kingdom of Ait Abbas; Kingdom of Kuku; France

Commanders and leaders
(Spain) Alonso de Córdoba (Spain) Martín de Córdoba (Spain) Francisco de Mendoza y Vargas (Spain) Álvaro de Bazán	Hasan Pasha; Jafar Catania; Dragut

Strength
1,500 men 90 guns Naval reinforcements: 34 galley and 4000 men	15.000 men 10 000 horsemen 30 galleys 15 galliots and fustas 5 carracks Several minor ships

Casualties and losses
Unknown	Heavy human losses 5 galliots captured 4 carracks captured

The sieges of Oran and Mers El Kébir of 1563 is a major attempt by the regency of Algiers to retake the cities of Mers el-Kébir and Oran from the Spanish.

Between April and June 1563 in the larger Ottoman-Habsburg wars of the Mediterranean, the Regency of Algiers launched a major military offensive to retake the Spanish military-bases of Oran and Mers el Kébir on the Mediterranean North African coast of Algeria occupied by Spain since 1505. The states of Algiers and Triòli, the Principalities of Kabyle (Kuku and Beni Abbes), and other vassal tribes combined forces as one army under Hasan Pasha, son of Hayreddin Barbarossa, Jafar Catania, Dragut and son of Ahmed Belkadi the sultan of Kuku kingdom. The Spanish commander brothers, Alonso de Córdoba Count of Alcaudete and Martín de Córdoba, managed to hold the strongholds of Oran and Mers El Kébir, respectively, until the relief fleet of Francisco de Mendoza arrived and lead to Algerians forces retreat.

== Background ==
With the defeat of the Knights of Malta and the conquest of Tripoli by the Ottoman admiral Turgut Reis in 1551, and the fall of Bougie to the governor of Algiers, Salih Reis, in 1555, Oran and Mers El Kébir were, along with the island of La Goulette, the only remaining possessions of Christendom in Barbary resisting Ottoman and Moorish piracy operating along the coasts of Naples, Sicily, and the Levant. When the Ottoman commander Hasan Corso's fleet of 50 galleys besieged both towns in the Siege of Oran in 1556, it was Sultan Suleiman's order to withdraw his galleys for use in the Eastern Mediterranean that ensured Oran and Mers El Kébir could continue under Spanish control despite being weakly defended.

In 1562, Hasan Pasha, son of Hayreddin Barbarossa and the Ottoman governor of Algiers, purposed to incorporate the Spanish garrisons of Oran and Mers El Kébir into the territories of Algiers. When King Philip II discovered the plan he ordered the assembly of a fleet from Barcelona to transport 4,000 soldiers as reinforcements. On October 19, 1562, a storm led to the naval disaster that became known as La Herradura. The Spanish fleet off the city of Málaga was destroyed, 24 of the 27 galleys sank, and a large number of sailors and soldiers, including Juan de Mendoza, Captain General of the Galleys of Spain, perished.

Hassan Pasha, instructed by the Sultan Suleiman, assembled soon an army of 100,000 men among Turks, Algerines, and a large number of Janissaries. This army was supported by sea by a fleet of 30 galleys, 5 French carracks, and 15 small vessels under the command of Dragut, governor of Tripoli, Jafar Catania, governor of Tlemcen, It was a total of 50-60 ships. With these forces Hassan went to Mers El Kébir, stronghold whose dominion he considered essential to capture Oran. Meanwhile, Alonso and Martin de Córdoba had received supplies, gunpowder, tools, and a few soldiers from Málaga. To hold together both towns in order to help each other, they decided to build two forts: San Miguel, located on the hill that separated Oran from Mers El Kébir, and Todos los Santos, facing the second town.

== Siege ==
=== Forts San Miguel and Todos los Santos ===
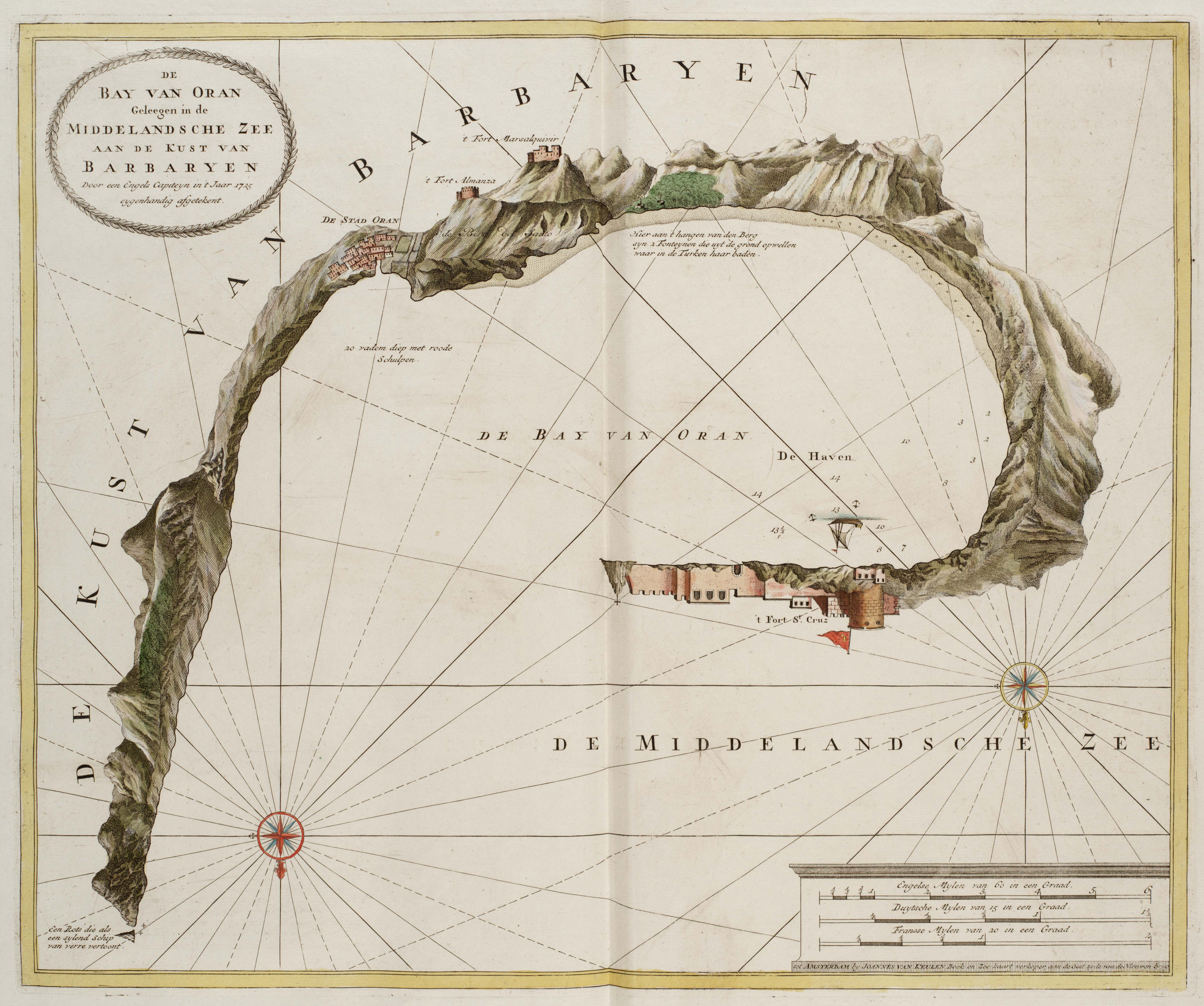
Map of the Bay of Oran in 1725, by Johannes van Keulen.

The siege began on April 3, 1563, when Ottoman troops massively attacked the tower of Todos los Santos, defended by 200 Spanish soldiers. The fierce resistance of the fort's garrison, along with artillery support from Mers El Kébir, inflicted heavy casualties on the attackers. However, once the Ottoman cannons tore down the walls, the fort was soon taken. Meantime Jafar and Dragut put their galleys to blockade Mers El Kébir to prevent the city to be relieved from Oran. Ottoman's main objective was to capture Mers El Kébir, as Hassan was warned by several renegades that the Spanish planned to abandon Oran to concentrate on the defense of the other town. Therefore, he destined most of his troops to take the fort of San Miguel, a key point of the Spanish defense, while only a few troops remained blocking Oran.

San Miguel's fort was attacked over 22 days by 24,000 infantry and 400 cavalry soldiers. His few defenders rejected Hassan's offer of surrender and successfully repelled six assaults which left the moat full of dead Janissaries. Among the Ottoman casualties was the governor of Constantine, whose body could be recovered by his men with the permission of Martín de Córdoba. However, despite the stubbornness of the defense, the reinforcements sent from Mers el Kébir were not enough to continue fighting, and on May 8, under cover of darkness, the Spanish survivors retreated to the town.

=== Siege of Mers El Kébir ===
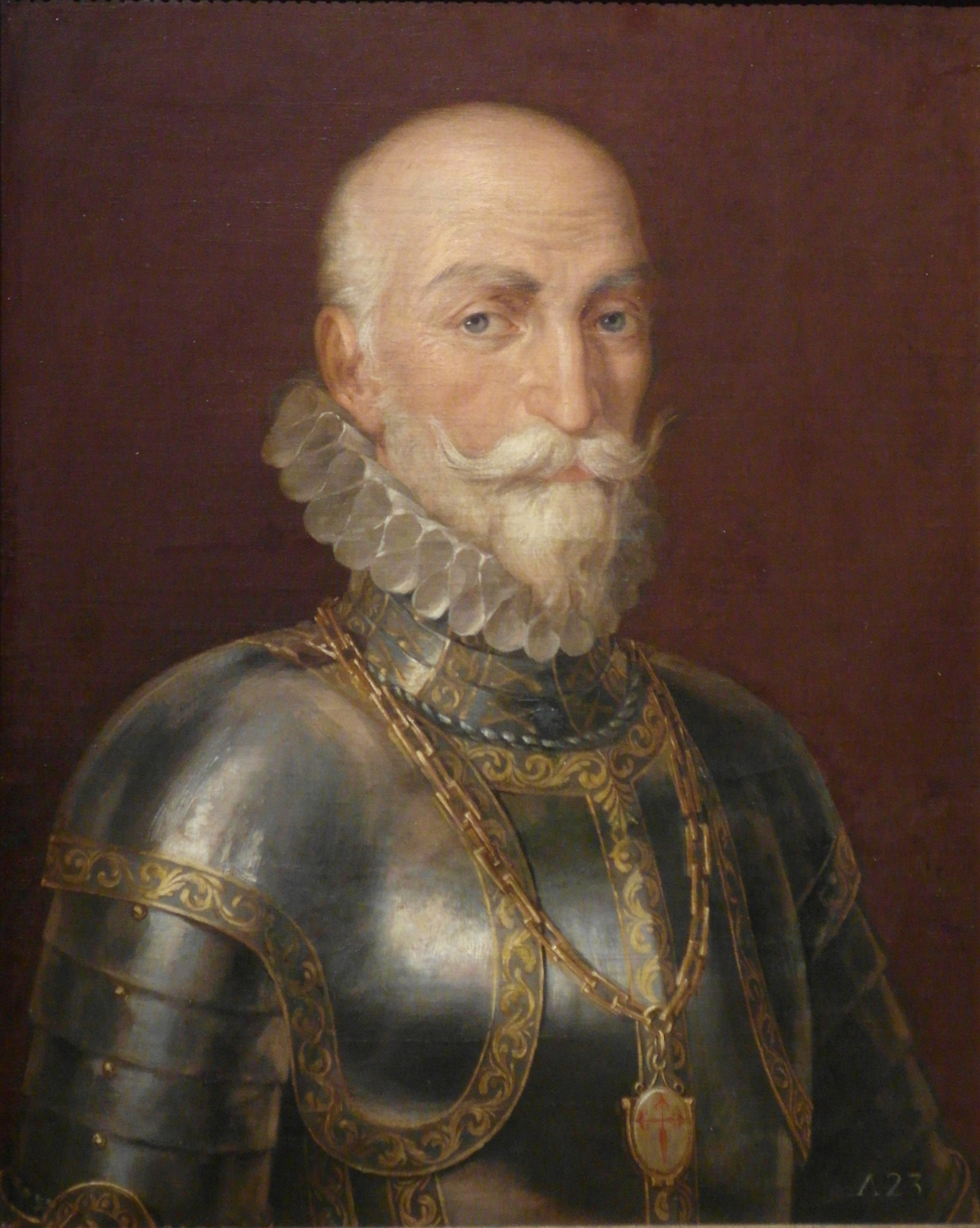
Álvaro de Bazán, 1st Marquis of Santa Cruz.

Once inside the fort, the Ottoman troops surrounded the city, digging trenches around and placing artillery to break down the walls. On a nearby hill were also installed several culverins to bombard the inner town. Martín de Córdoba, who had less than 500 men available to defend the city, prepared for the assault. This one took place on 20 May. Hassan sent ahead 12,000 Arabs to break the resistance of the Spanish arquebusiers and facilitate the assault by two columns of regular troops which would attack secondly. Despite the heavy losses they suffered, the Arabs managed to scale the walls and raise the Ottoman flag on the battlements. However, the Spanish soon expelled them. In that attack nearly 2,500 men died, mostly falling into the moat around the town.

In the following days, more assaults took place which also failed with great loss of life, although the Spanish situation had become desperate. On June 6 Hassan was about to order the final assault, when a relief fleet took his army by surprise. King Philip II had ordered a fleet to be organized in Cartagena in order to attack Hassan's army and force it to lift the siege. Under the command of Francisco de Mendoza y Vargas, who was seconded by Álvaro de Bazán and Giovanni Andrea Doria, 34 galleys coming from Barcelona, Naples, Genoa, Savoy, and Malta, had embarked 4,000 soldiers and many volunteer knights, and had sailed to Mers el Kébir without awaiting for any more reinforcement.

When the Christian fleet arrived, part of the Ottoman fleet had been detached to retrieve supplies, so Dragut did not attempt to resist the assault and escaped, managing to save his flotilla. For his part Hassan, fearing to be trapped between the Spanish reinforcements and Mers El Kébir, ordered his troops to retreat hastily. The tents could be saved, but guns, clothing, and tools were left in the field. The Ottoman fleet was not so lucky, and several of its ships, including four of the French carracks, were captured. The Christians also captured several renegade Genoese ships secretly trading with the Ottomans.

== Aftermath ==
After disembarking reinforcements and supplies at Oran and Mers El Kébir, Francisco de Mendoza's fleet returned to Spain. King Philip II, informed about the development of the siege, decided to reward Martín de Córdoba and Francisco Vivero, commanding officer of Fort San Miguel, for keeping these two crucial strongholds in Spanish hands. In fact, this allowed the following year the capture of the Peñón de Vélez de la Gomera, a success which was followed in 1565 by the decisive defense of Malta against the fleet of Turgut Reis. Several years later, in 1574, it was discussed at the Spanish court whether or not to abandon Oran and Mers El Kébir. King Philip II ordered Vespasian Gonzaga Colonna, Prince of Sabbioneta and Duke of Trayecto, to make a comprehensive report about the situation of both towns. Gonzaga advised to abandon Oran but to keep Mers El Kebir. However, marshal Juan Muñoz sent to the king a report by Sancho de Leyva advising to keep both strongholds. Philip II finally opted for Leyva's advice.
