= Viso del Marqués =

- Municipality
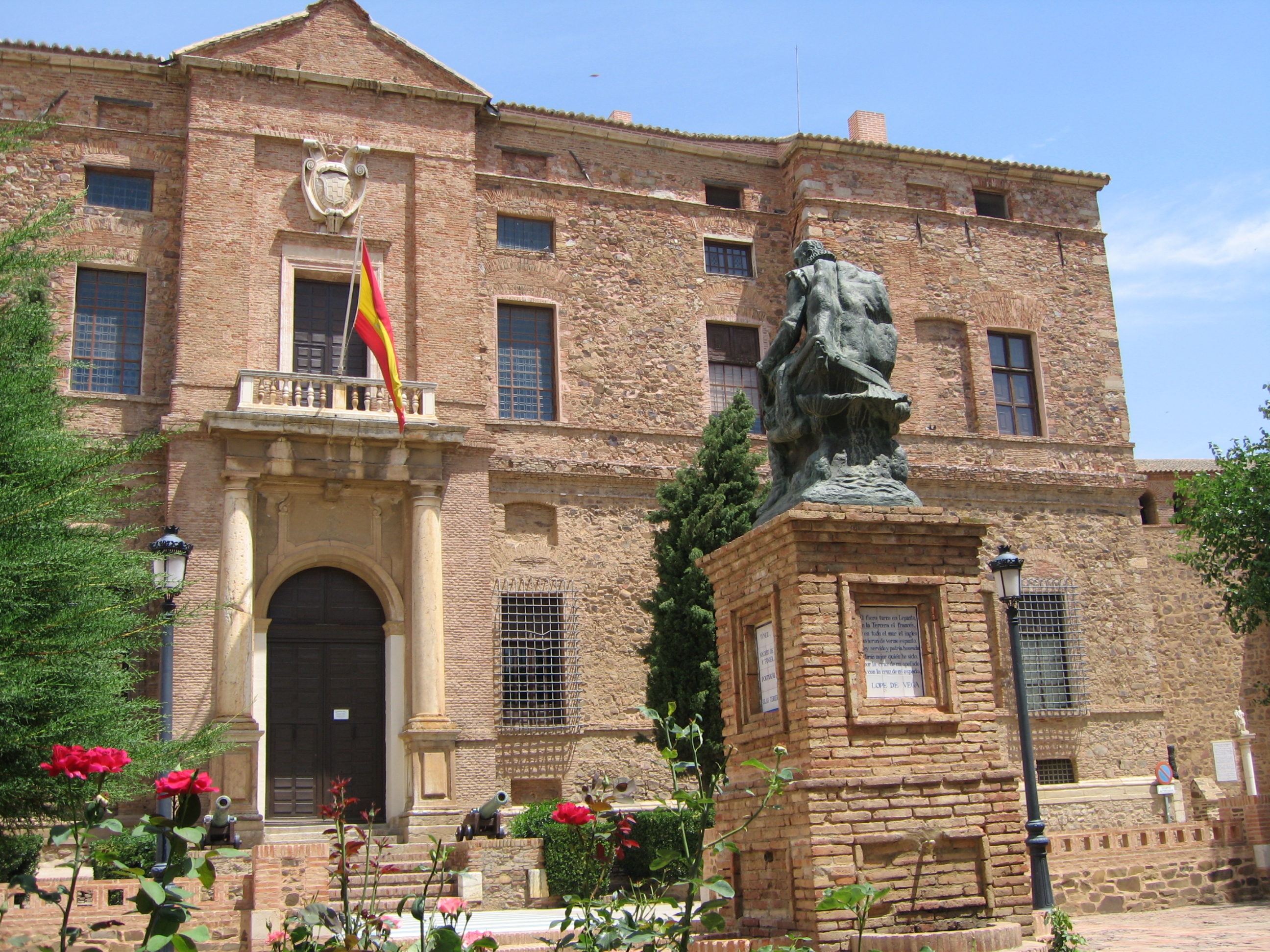
- Palace of the Marquis of Santa Cruz

- Flag Coat of arms

- Location in Spain
- Coordinates: 38°31′18″N 3°33′48″W
- Country: Spain
- Autonomous community: Castile-La Mancha
- Province: Ciudad Real
- Mancomunidad: Manserja

Government
  - Alcalde: Alfonso Toledo Fernández

Area
  - Total: 533.2 km^{2} (205.9 sq mi)
- Elevation: 785 m (2,575 ft)

Population (2025-01-01)
  - Total: 2,091
  - Density: 3.922/km^{2} (10.16/sq mi)
- Demonym: Viseño/a
- Time zone: UTC+1 (CET)
  - Summer (DST): UTC+2 (CEST)
- Postal code: 13770

Viso del Marqués is a municipality located in the province of Ciudad Real, Castile-La Mancha, Spain. According to the 2014 census, The municipality has a population of 2,578 inhabitants.

It is the site of the Palace of the Marquis of Santa Cruz, built in the late sixteenth century by Álvaro de Bazán, 1st Marquess of Santa Cruz. Álvaro de Bazan was a senior admiral in the Spanish Navy, and created the concept of the Spanish Armada – but died before it was deployed to attack England. The Marquis's palace has been repurposed as the modern headquarters of the National Archive of the Spanish Navy.
