= Palace of the Marquis of Santa Cruz =

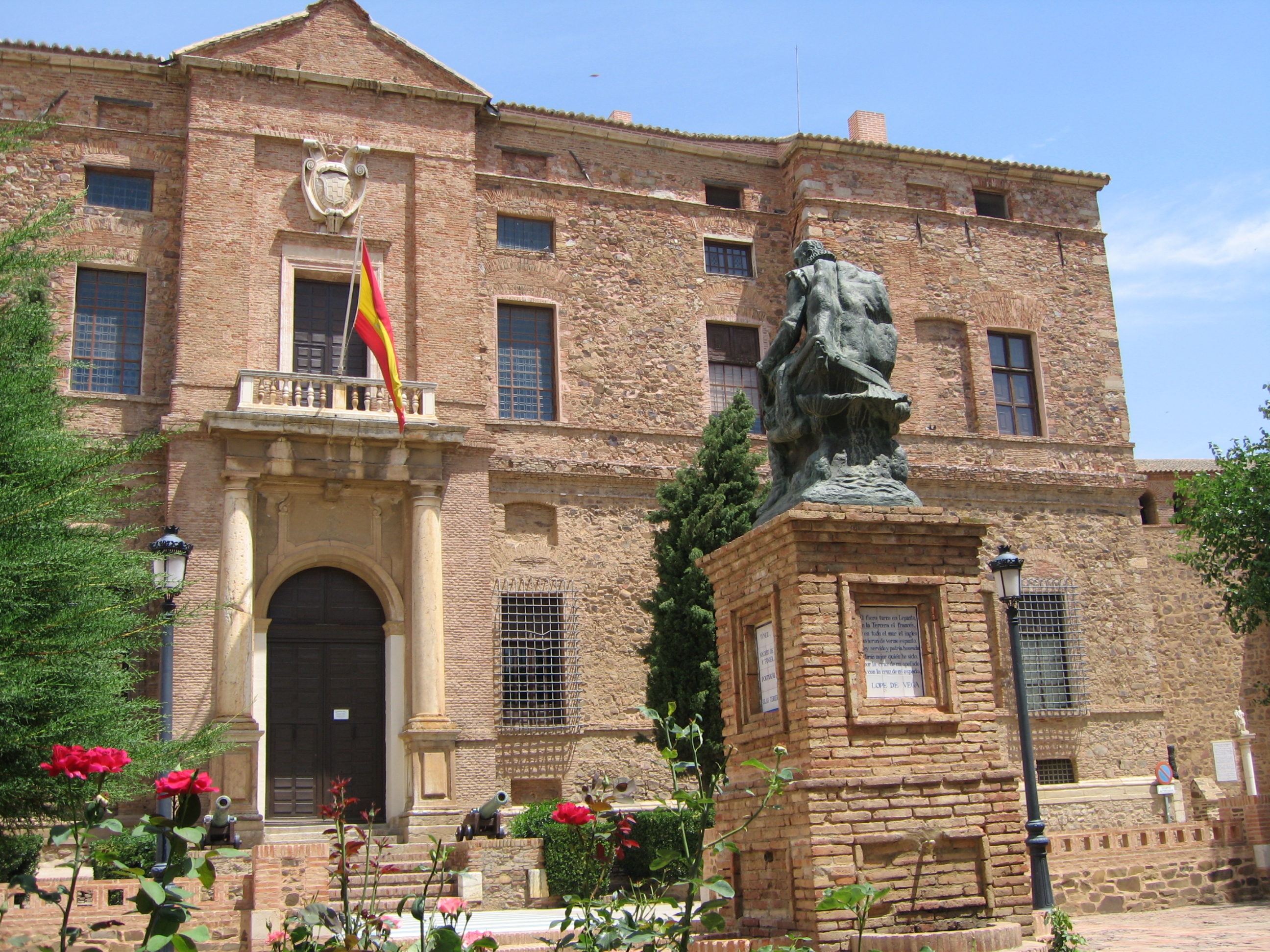
- Interactive map of the Palace of the Marquis of Santa Cruz area

General information
- Type: Palace
- Architectural style: Renaissance architecture
- Classification: Bien de Interés Cultural
- Location: Viso del Marqués, Spain
- Coordinates: 38.5231°N 3.5632°W

Spanish Cultural Heritage
- Official name: Palacio del Marqués de Santa Cruz
- Type: Non-movable
- Criteria: Monument
- Designated: 3 June 1931
- Reference no.: RI-51-0000515-00000

The Palace of the Marquis of Santa Cruz is a 16th-century Italian-style building in Viso del Marqués, Spain.

== History and description ==
The palace was built on behalf of Álvaro de Bazán, 1st Marquis of Santa Cruz. The project, that reportedly kickstarted on 15 November 1564, was participated by the Italian architects Juan Baptista Bergamasco and Juan Baptista Olamasquín. The interior was decorated with mouldings, doorways, fireplaces and frescoes, following the Genoese aesthetics. The collection of frescoes has been noted among the highlights of the Spanish Renaissance. The palace was declared national historic-artistic monument in 1931.

Since 1950, the building houses the premises of the General Archive of the Spanish Navy.

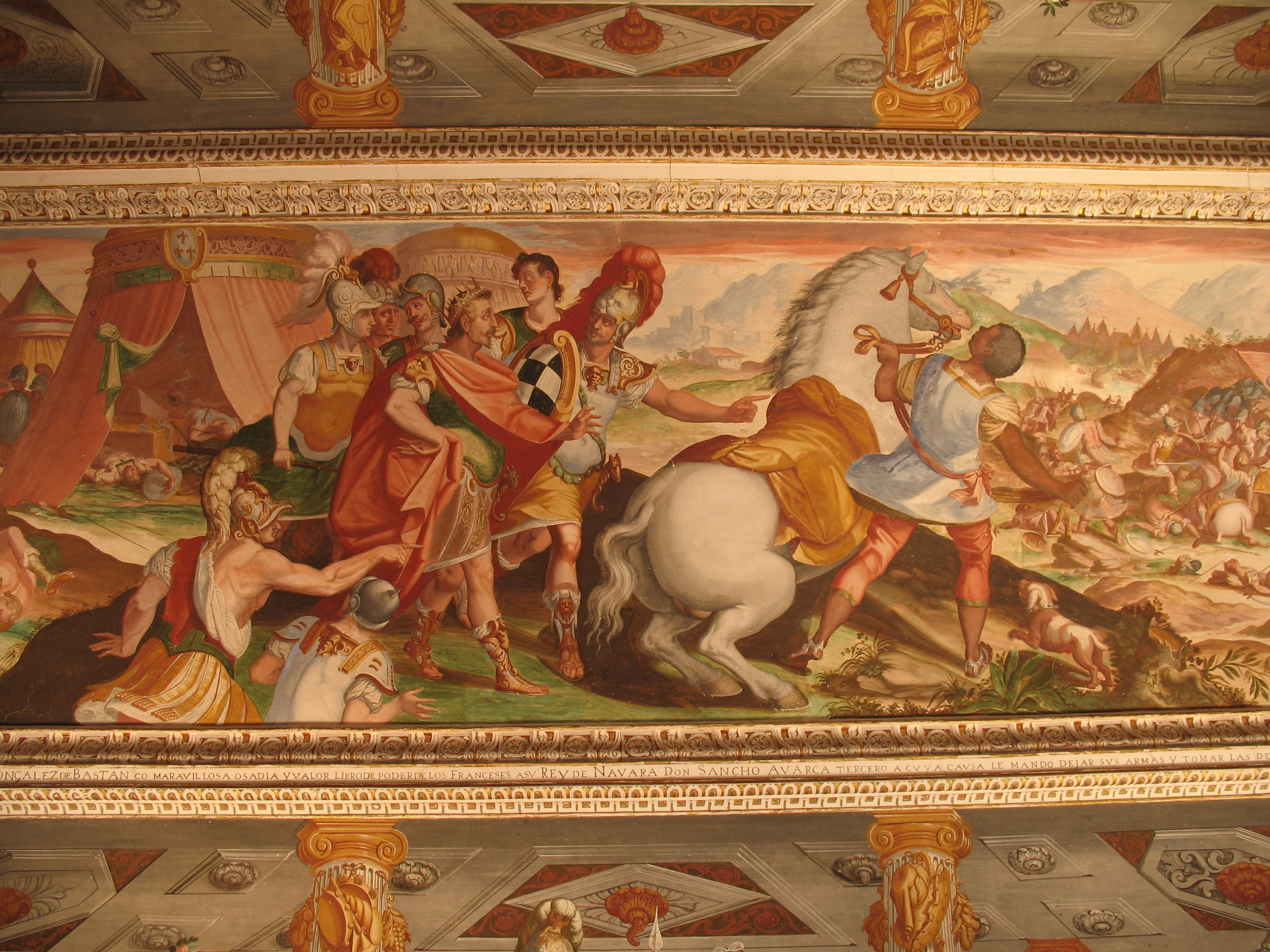
Fresco

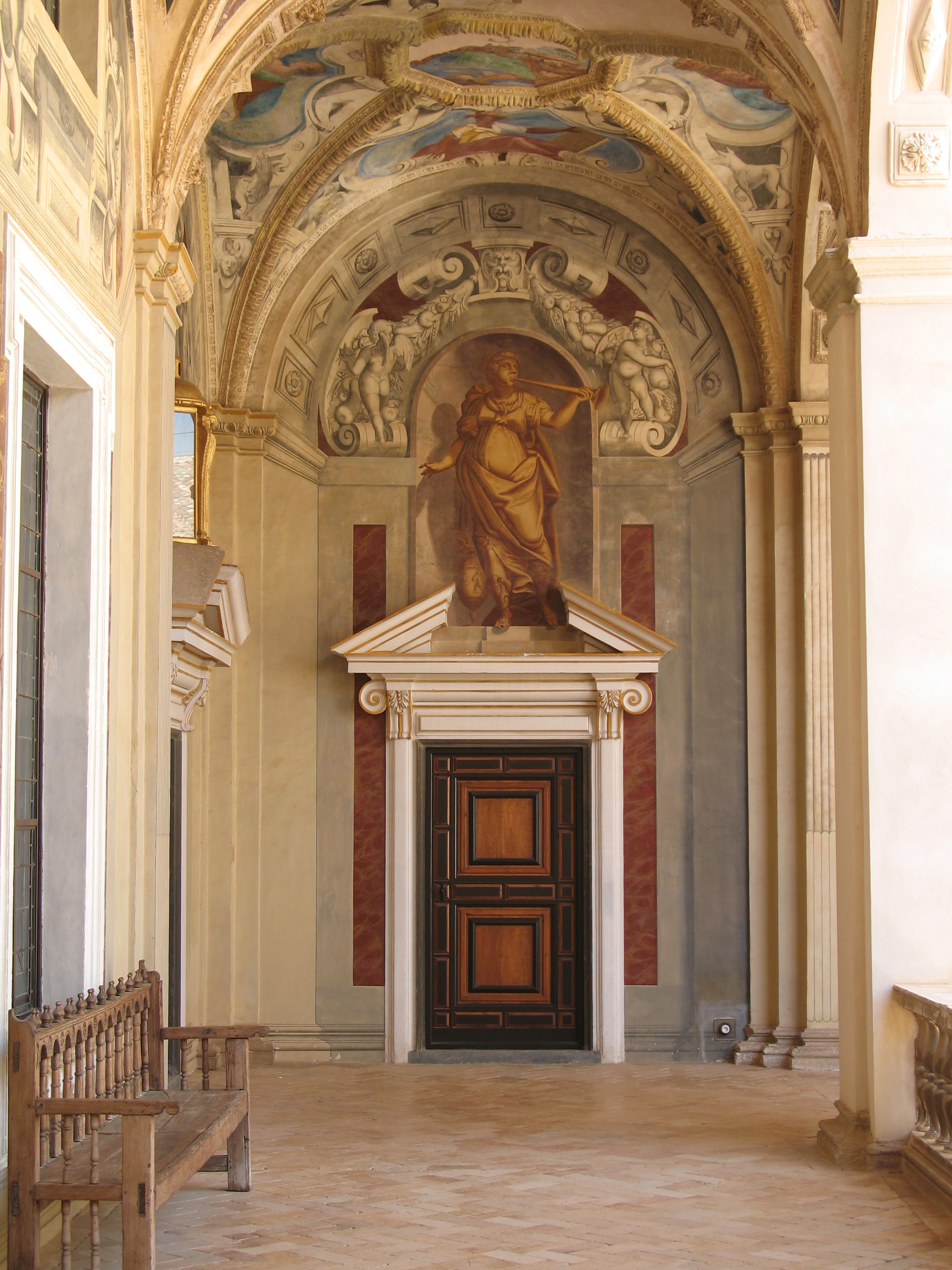
Gallery
