= Luis Hurtado de Mendoza, 2nd Marquess of Mondéjar =

Spanish nobleman (1489–1566)

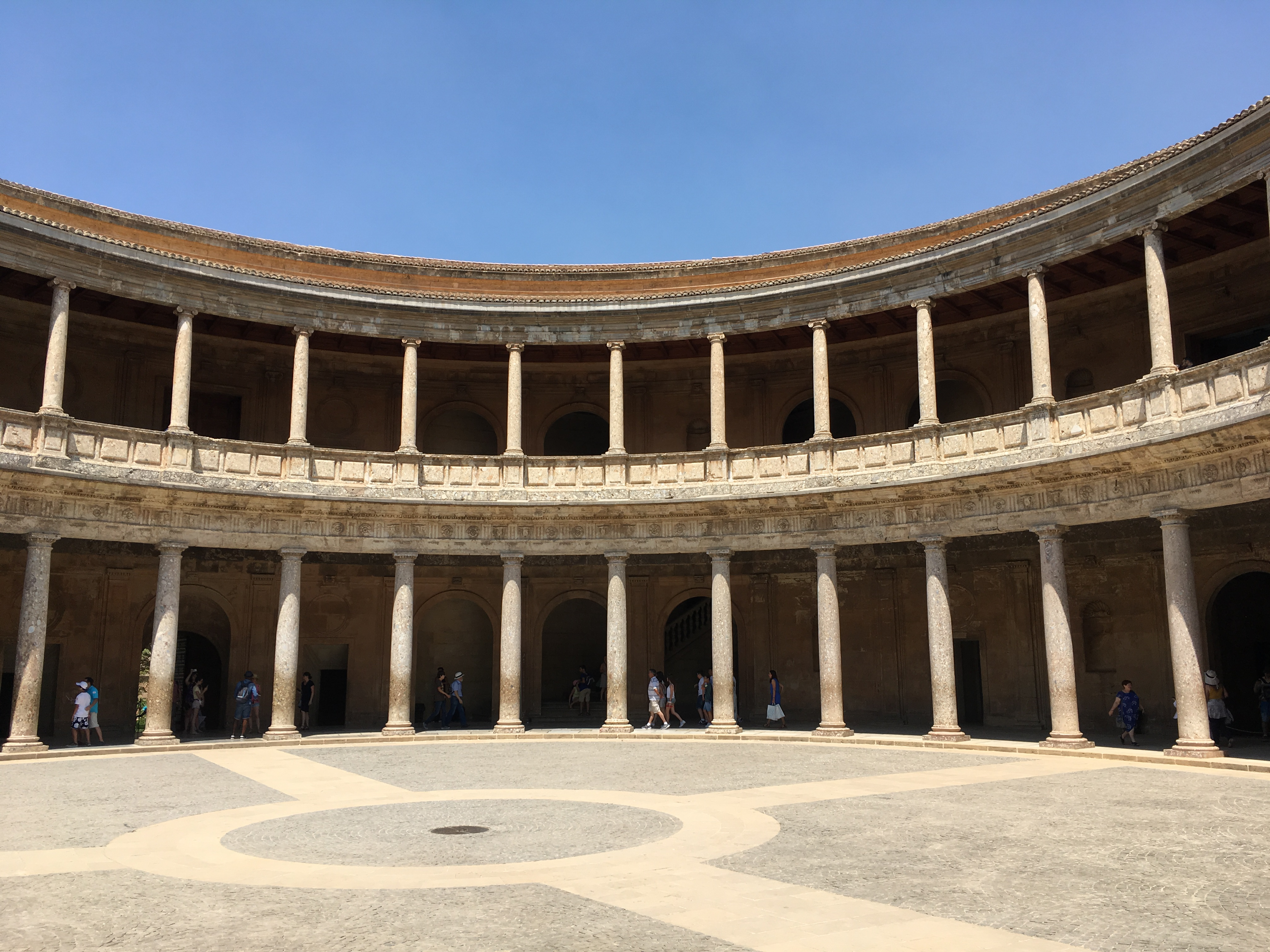
Charles V Palace, Alhambra, Granada (Spain), built under supervision of Luis Hurtado de Mendoza

Luis Hurtado de Mendoza y Pacheco (Mondejar, Guadalajara, Spain, 1489 – 19 December 1566), 3rd Count of Tendilla (Spanish: Conde de Tendilla) and the 2nd Marquis of Mondéjar (Marqués de Mondéjar), was a Spanish nobleman in the service of Charles V, Holy Roman Emperor. He was Captain General of Granada and Viceroy of Navarre in 1543–1546.

== Life ==
Luis Hurtado de Mendoza y Pacheco was the eldest son of Íñigo López de Mendoza y Quiñones (1440 –1515), 2nd Count of Tendilla, 1st Marquis of Mondéjar and Captain General of Granada .

Like his father, he held the positions of warden of the Alhambra and Captain General of Granada.
Luis Hurtado was the first member of the House of Mendoza that supported Charles of Habsburg during the Revolt of the Comuneros, despite the fact that his own sister María Pacheco and her husband Juan López de Padilla were amongst the leaders of the revolt.

In 1525, he led a failed attempt to reconquer Peñón de Vélez de la Gomera. He became a personal friend of the Emperor ever since Charles and his wife, Isabella of Portugal, stayed at the Alhambra on their honeymoon in June 1526. As warden of the Alhambra, he played an important role in the initiative to build the Palace of Charles V within the Alhambra complex, the construction of which began in 1533, after some years of disagreements about the exact location and design of the palace.

He played an important role in the Conquest of Tunis (1535), in assembling the fleet and in eliminating the artillery of the enemy during the battle.

He remained loyal to King Charles for his entire life and received many important titles and functions.
He became the 3rd Count of Tendilla; Viceroy of Navarre in 1543–1546; President of the Council of Indies in 1546–1559; and President of the Council of Castile in 1561–1563.

He married with Catalina Mendoza y Zúñiga and had:

- Francisco Hurtado de Mendoza y Mendoza, predeceased his father when he drowned in the La Herradura naval disaster (1562)
- Francisca Mendoza y Mendoza, married Baltasar Ladron De La Maza
- Iñigo López de Mendoza y Mendoza (1511–1580), 3rd Marquis of Mondejar, married Maria Mendoza Y Aragón, daughter of Íñigo López de Mendoza, 4th Duke of the Infantado
- María de Mendoza (1526-1580), a nun.
