= Giovanni Andrea Doria =

Genoese admiral in the service of Spain

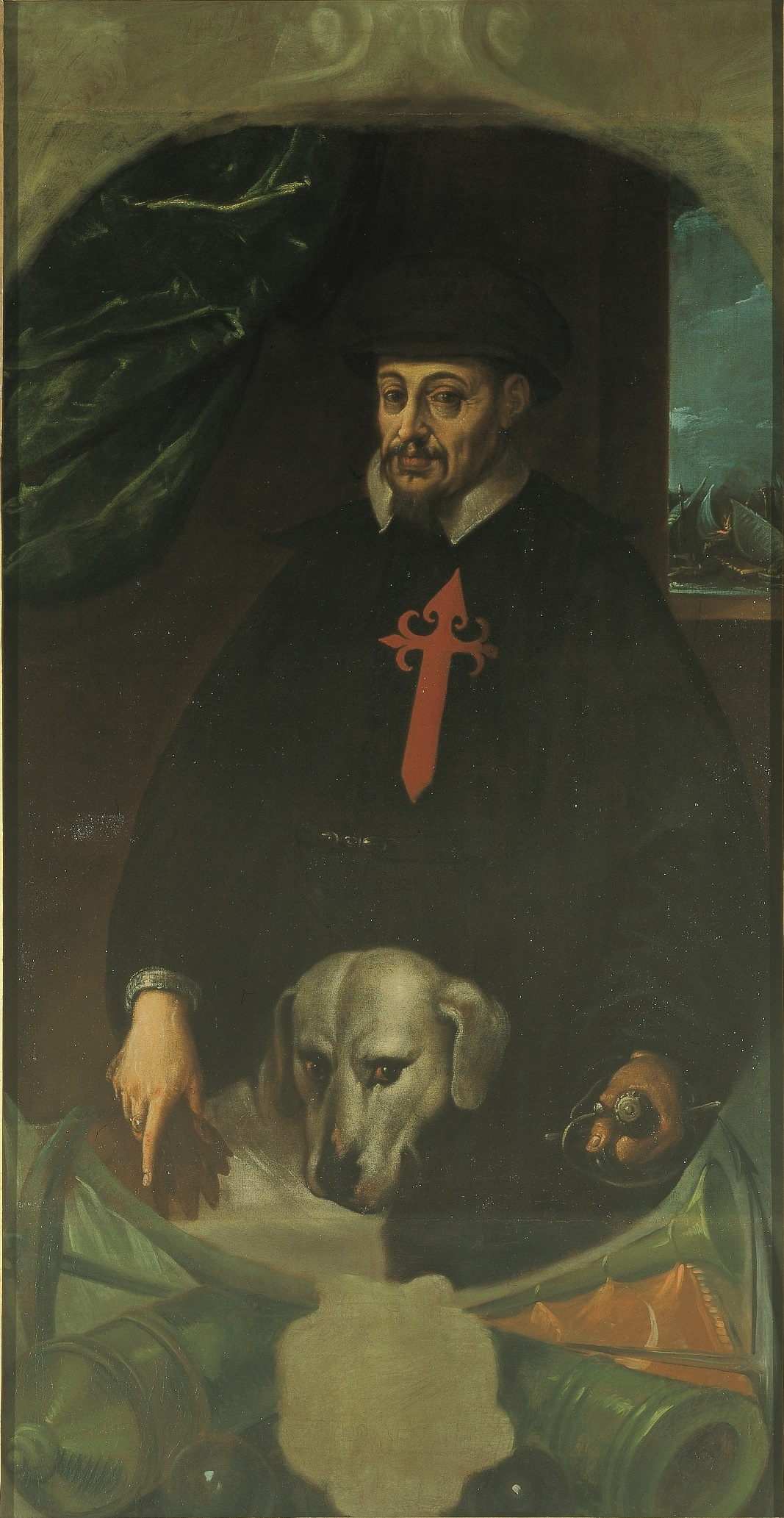
- c. 1594 portrait
- Born: 1539
- Died: 1606 (aged 66-67)
- Military career
- Allegiance: Republic of Genoa
- Rank: Admiral
- Nickname: "Gianandrea" Doria
- Commands: Genoese Fleet
- Conflicts: Ottoman–Habsburg wars; Battle of Djerba; Sieges of Oran and Mers El Kébir; Conquest of Peñón de Vélez de la Gomera; Great Siege of Malta; Battle of Lepanto; Siege of Navarino; Conquest of Tunis

Giovanni Andrea Doria (1539 – 1606), also known as Gianandrea Doria, was an Italian admiral and shipbuilder from Genoa. He was Marquis of Tursi and Prince of Melfi, which he inherited from his great-uncle, the famous Andrea Doria.

He spent his entire career in the service of the Spanish Empire as a commander and naval contractor, fighting against the French and the Ottomans. Unlike the renowned Andrea, he lacked major victories to his name and was dogged by controversy regarding his participation in the battles of Djerba and Lepanto, which earned him a partially undeserved reputation for incompetence. Nevertheless, he played a role in a long series of victorious Spanish campaigns, supporting them with his fleets and logistical capabilities.

His political and business career was less controversial, becoming one of the most influential figures in Spanish Mediterranean politics during the reigns of Philip II and Philip III. He was a lifelong member of the pro-Spanish faction in Genoa, where his leadership elevated the Doria family to new heights.

== Birth and early years ==
Doria was the son of Giannettino Doria, of the noble Doria family family of the Republic of Genoa. He was considered an intelligent and precocious child, who by the age of six had already read the chronicles of Julius Caesar. Shortly thereafter, his father was assassinated during the Fieschi conspiracy, prompting his great-uncle Andrea Doria to adopt him and immediately begin training him as his political and military successor. Giovanni started serving on Andre's galleys at the age of eight, and by fourteen he had already commanded entire squadrons of the Genoese fleet. During his childhood, a marriage was also arranged between him and Zenobia del Carretto, daughter of Marcantonio del Carretto, a nobleman whom Andrea Doria had adopted for political reasons. Giovanni and Zenobia had grown up together and were already close.

== Italian Wars ==
In 1554, at just fifteen years of age, Giovanni began his career as deputy admiral to Andrea during the final Italian War. Warned about a Franco-Ottoman fleet commanded by Antoine Escalin des Aimars and Salah Rais off the coast of northern Italy, the octogenarian Andrea delegated to Giovanni the task of preventing the enemy from landing near Porto Ercole. However, Giovanni and his 26 Genoese and Florentine galleys found the Franco-Ottoman armada numbered 56 ships, so the Genoese commander opted to call off the engagement and instead attack the enemy port of Civitavecchia. This decision drew criticism, pointing out that the enemy vessels were weaker and that allied land-based support was available. The immense expectation on Giovanni became evident, given that he was effectively being reproached for not engaging a fleet more than twice the size of his own.

In October of that same year, following the victory at Marciano over the army of Siena (an ally of France), Doria transported reinforcements for the Hispano-Florentine army of Gian Giacomo Medici, which was busy besieging the city. He then joined forces with admiral Bernardino de Mendoza, though their actions failed to satisfy Duke Cosimo I of Florence, who viewed the young Genoese with displeasure. In March 1555, amidst fears of an approaching major Ottoman armada, Giovanni deployed with 42 Genoese and Neapolitan galleys to blockade Piero Strozzi's supply lines in the Piombino Channel, while the elderly Andrea reinforced Agostino Spinola in Corsican revolt, which was by then largely reconquered from the French. In 1556 he narrowly escaped with his life from a storm that sank one of his fleets off Corsica, which led him to propose improvements in the training of Genoese pilots.

Coin with the image of Doria.

During the restart of the last Italian War in 1557, now under King Philip II, Giovanni Andrea and his relative and rival Antonio Doria came out with their respective galley squads. Very little action took place in the sea, as their French and Papal enemies barely had navies of their own, so the two Genoese had little to do, focusing especially in transporting land troops and helping against the Corsican revolt. Giovanni helped carrying the army of the Duke of Alba to invade the Papal States. In 1558, Doria managed to drive Ottoman admiral Piali Pasha off the Italian coast.

Despite initial skepticisms, he proved to be an effective commander during the Italian War, although he was criticized for possessing a character better suited to commerce and court life than to the military. He balanced his service with constant business ventures, concerned about the depletion of the family coffers caused by Andrea Doria's generosity and the payment delays typical of the Spanish Empire. This situation led to a clash between Giovanni and his uncle against his father-in-law Marcantonio, a conflict that required Philip II himself to broker a reconciliation so that the marriage to Zenobia could proceed. In 1559, alongside his uncle, he took part in secret talks with Philip in Brussels regarding a potential military intervention in Genoa to safeguard their shared interests, though the end of the war ultimately brought about a peaceful resolution.

== War against the Ottoman Empire ==
=== Djerba ===
In 1560, at just 21 years old, he was given command of a combined Christian fleet of 100 ships for a projected reconquest of Tripoli on behalf of the Knights Hospitaller. However, although he had the counsel of his uncle Andrea, who refrained from participating due to his advanced age—the expedition was marred by a combination of poor preparation and questionable conduct. Upon arriving in Africa, Giovanni fell gravely ill with a epidemic caused by the local swampy terrains, to the point where his former tutor and aide Plinio Tomacelli had to act as an intermediary between him and the other commanders on the council.

The expedition's land commander, Juan de la Cerda, duke of Medinaceli, insisted on building a fortress on the island of Djerba, a decision that Doria and the Hospitaller contingent of the fleet criticized as both pointless and dangerous. Yet, days after construction began, news arrived that Piali Pasha was approaching from Constantinople with 80 ships, spreading panic within the Christian camp. Doria, suffering from a relapse of his illness that had nearly claimed his life, urged the fleet to set sail and flee rather than risk the ships, the Christian ships, against others' advice to stay and fight the Ottomans off with their superior artillery.

The Christian fleet's departure was further hampered by adverse winds, allowing the Turkish fleet to catch up with them. Doria issued no further orders; when his flagship ran aground during the retreat, he succumbed to panic and abandoned the vessel to seek refuge ashore. The chronicler Herrera attributes his behavior to his illness. Be that as it may, the fleet was left leaderless and in disarray, resulting in the capture of a large portion of it during the ensuing battle. Rescued from the fort's garrison by Álvaro de Sande, Doria planned to rally the ships that had escaped and gather reinforcements in Sicily and Malta, but once he arrived there, Philip II vetoed the rescue operation, believing Sande could repeal the siege by himself.

Although Giovanni had managed to escape with his life, the stress and shame supposedly caused the older Andrea Doria to die. The disaster at Djerba had a disastrous impact on the reputations of both Giovanni and the Genoese fleet, even though Giovanni pointed out that his advice had been rejected from the start. The situation had been compounded by the heavy loss of galleys they owned. He spent the following summer commanding a score of ships, but the earlier disaster made it impossible to challenge Dragut's fleet, which was plundering at will. Although the Spanish fleet was rebuilt in 1561, Giovanni was replaced in command by his father-in-law, Marcantonio, who launched a hunt for Dragut, without success.

=== Oran and Vélez ===
Having lost the favor of highest ranks, Doria never again held main commands. The Genoese, always more at ease in politics and commerce than on the battlefield, turned his attention to reorganizing his business affairs in Genoa, while simultaneously relaunching his career at the court of Philip II. During this period, he overhauled the family fleet and estates within the Republic. Among his diplomatic efforts, he persuaded Philip II not to reduce the number of family-owned galleys under contract with Spain.

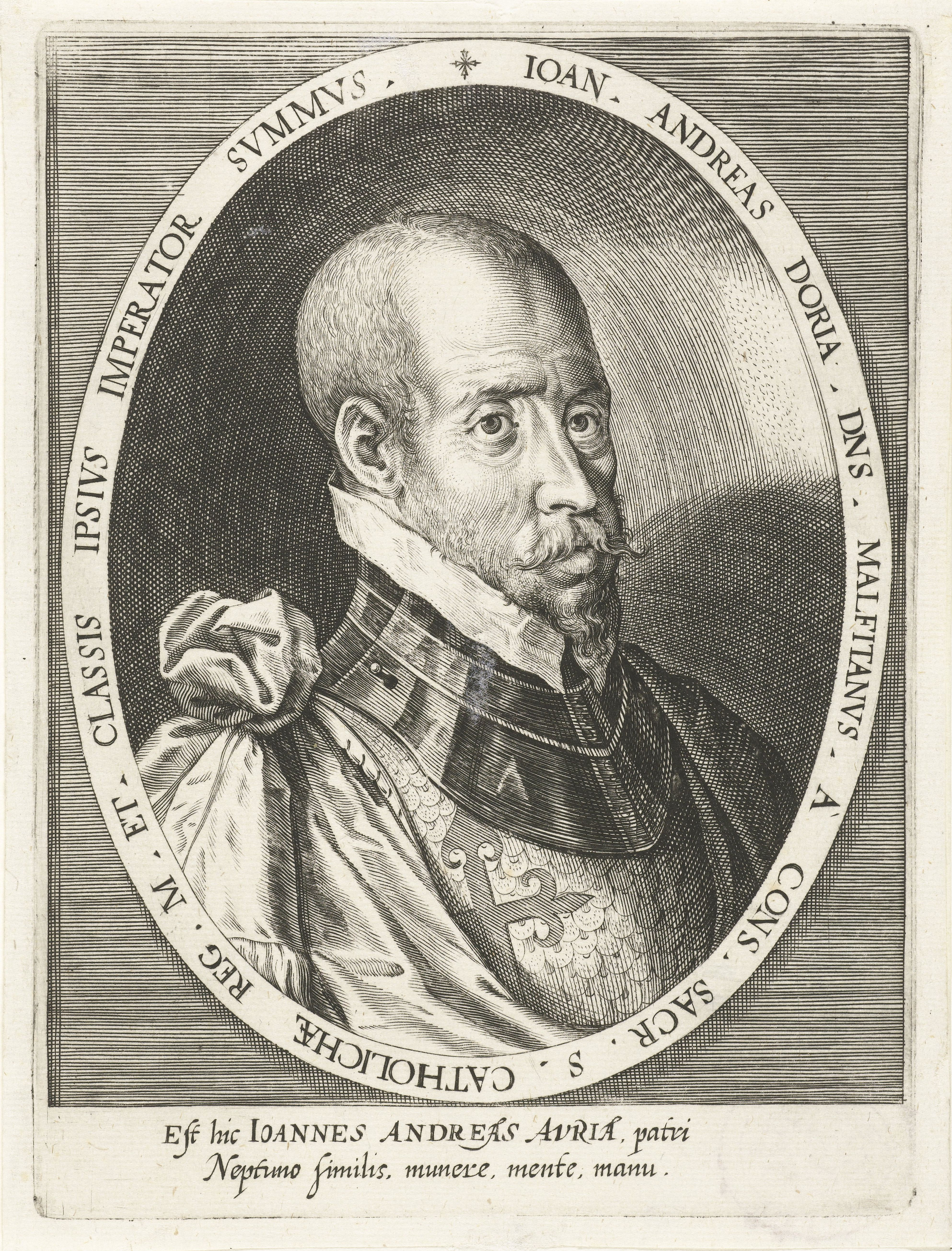
Giovanni Andrea Doria

In 1563, he was called to relief the Ottoman siege of Oran. Giovanni still expected to be handed command of the Christian fleet, but command was given to Francisco de Mendoza, leading Doria to protest to King Philip II, who convinced him to comply. Doria decided to take no high position whatsoever and handed command of the Genoese squad to his brother Pagano, electing to participate entirely as a volunteer. In any case, the operation was a success, surprising the Ottoman fleet of Dragut when it had divided itself to bring supplies from Algiers, eventually forcing it to withdraw. After Mendoza died of illness, although Doria requested the command again, Philip gave the job to the renowned veteran García de Toledo, which was deemed much fitter.

In 1564, Doria served under Toledo during the conquest of the Peñón de Vélez de la Gomera, where he was tasked with disembarking the artillery and placing it at land. He also explored the fortress personally and climbed it after it had been finally abandoned by its Ottoman garrison. This new success made him receive praise for his performance. He was later sent again to the Genoese colony of Corsica to help against the French-aligned revolt of Sampiero Corso, which was eventually drowned.

=== Malta and the Alpujarras ===
In 1565, he served again under García de Toledo in the relief of the Great Siege of Malta. Doria and Álvaro de Bazán brought squadrons of galleys to Sicily to assemble the rescue fleet. The Genoese commander shared a close bond with the Grand Master of the Hospitallers, Jean Parisot de Valette, even addressing each other as father and son, and advocated from the very beginning for the island's rescue. He even went so far as to ask Toledo for permission to join the defenders personally with four galleys should the decision be made not to launch a full relief expedition. He also pledged his own funds to the enterprise, stipulating that his heirs should cover the costs if he fell during the campaign.

When the relief fleet was assembled at Bazán's instigation, and deploye under Toledo himself, Doria was tasked with acting as a scout in a single galley. Before reaching Malta, he was spotted by a Turkish lookout brigantine. Although the enemy vessel could not catch him due to the shallow waters of the channel, Doria acted with great daring once the rest of the fleet arrived, maintaining communication with Maltese positions during the rapid landing operation. During these maneuvers, he was pursued by the Ottomans and wounded in the face by a Turkish arrow. The relief effort succeeded, however, forcing the Turkish fleet under Piali and Mustafa Pasha to retreat with heavy losses. The Siege of Malta thus became one of the great victories of the era.

In 1568, during the Rebellion of the Alpujarras, Doria assisted John of Austria, with whom he shared a close friendship, and captured several Barbary vessels. However, his ceaseless effort to balance the Doria family's accounts led him that same year to sell the County of Tursi, which he would not recover until much later.

== Turkish-Venetian War ==
=== Cyprus ===
In 1570, Philip II summoned Doria to join the alliance promoted by Pope Pius V, with the goal of relieving the Venetian colonies in Cyprus from the Ottoman threat. He was first ordered to provision La Goulette and await the end of a typhus outbreak that had struck the Venetian fleet. In the interim, Doria attempted to set a trap for the Turkish admiral Occhiali, ruler of Algiers, with the help of his assigned captains Álvaro de Bazán and Juan de Cardona, but a mistake by the last allowed the Turk to escape. Shortly thereafter, commanding 49 galleys, Doria linked up with the papal captain Marcantonio Colonna at Otranto, and together they sailed to Candia to meet their Venetian counterpart, Girolamo Zane. The allies had agreed that Colonna would lead the League while heeding Doria's advice, given the latter was the most experienced naval commander of the three, but this arrangement failed to prevent inevitable disagreements.

To make matters worse, Philip II was distrustful of both the Papal and Venetian forces, so he ordered Doria to support the League without endangering his own fleet, effectively pressuring Doria to either disobey or coerce Colonna if necessary. The Genoese admiral found these orders mystifying and difficult to execute. At that time, the monarch was not particularly aligned with the Pope's projects, and he planned to use the Spanish fleet independently to reconquer Tunis in the future.

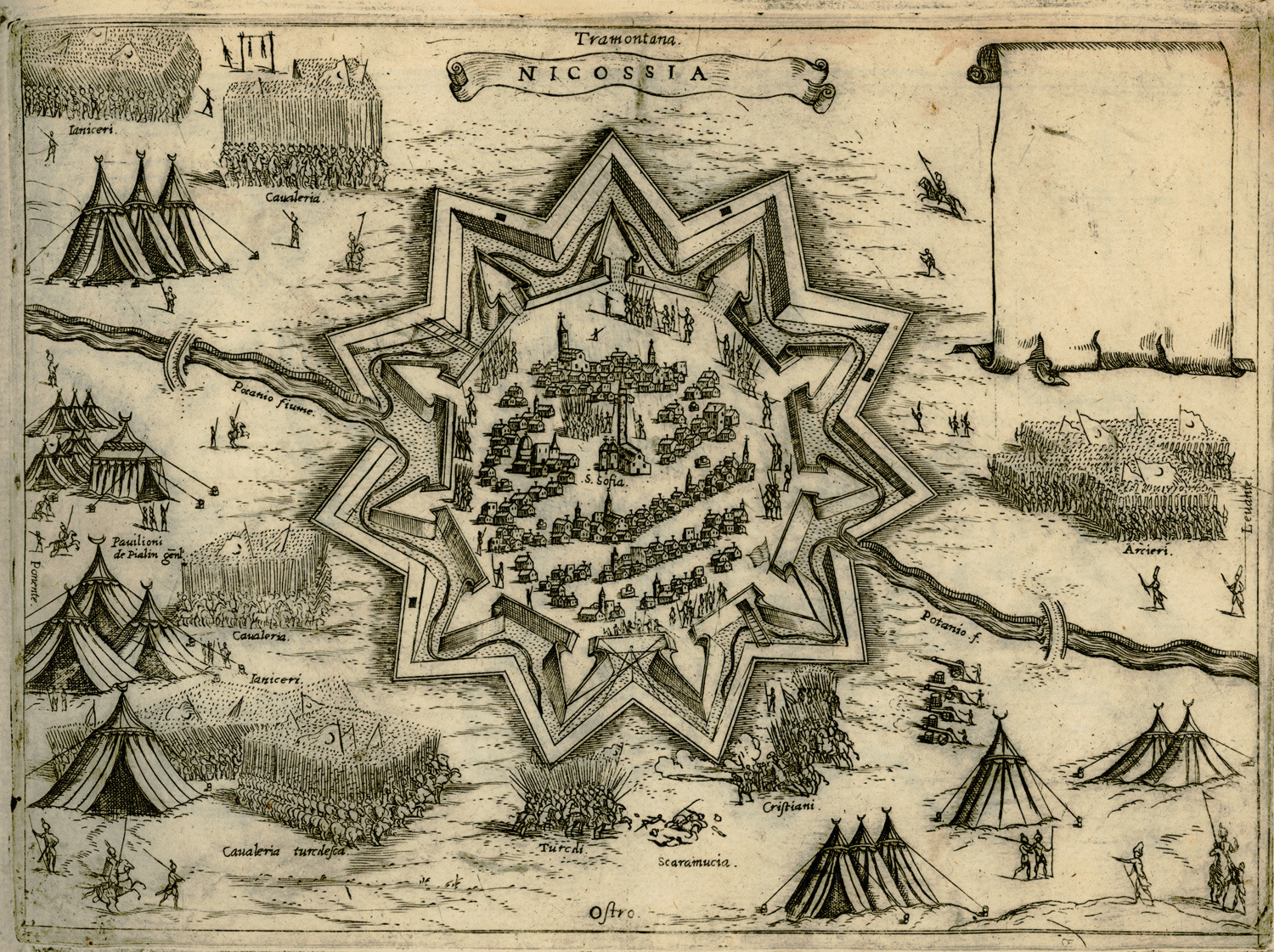
Map of the siege of Nicosia. Giovanni Camoccio, 1574.

The Christian admirals resolved to attack Turkish positions in Cyprus, where Ottoman forces were engaged in the siege of Nicosia, but Doria first insisted on inspecting the condition of the Venetian fleet, which proved to be extremely low. Doria refused to fight in such a state, also citing the imminent arrival of autumn weather, but Bazán sided with Colonna and Zane, arguing that the remaining time and the dispersion of the Turkish fleet would allow a decisive attack. By the time they arrived, they learned that Nicosia had already fallen. The admirals then resolved to attack the Turkish naval bases to draw the enemy away from the rest of Cyprus. Zane advocated attacking the Turkish base at Negroponte, but Doria believed it was too well defended, and instead advised attacking their fortresses in Morea or Albania, targets far better suited to their available resources, only to meet a refusal. Furthermore, the bad weather he had warned of soon set in.

Ultimately Doria, backed by Cardona and even Bazán, decided to abandon the campaign and move to Cephalonia to await royal orders. Although he acceded to the coalition's requests to remain, his relationship with Colonna was ruined, as he accused the Roman of irrationally siding with Venice. Carlo d'Avalos, a member of the Spanish entourage, even exchanged insults with Colonna on Doria's behalf. Finally, after a series of slights, the Venetians returned to their base at Candia, as did the Spaniards, who arrived in Candia even earlier before heading back to Sicily. Doria's seamanship was then demonstrated by the fact that the Spanish fleet was the only one among the allied forces to weather the storms and reach its home port intact, whereas the others lost a considerable number of ships.

As a result of these issues, the campaign to relieve Cyprus was a failure. Philip II attempted to mediate between Doria and Colonna, who by this point were harshly accusing each other of incompetence. Complicating matters were Venice's attempts to pin the blame on the Genoese commander, a consequence of the age-old enmity between Genoa and Venice. Doria also feared that Colonna and Bazán might form a political front against him.

=== Lepanto ===
The following year, Doria served under the command of John of Austria, alongside Bazán and Luis de Requesens, in the newly founded Holy League. The new campaign proved difficult, as Doria faced significant friction with the Venetian fleet, in addition to his rivalry with Colonna, whom Giovanni rightfully accused of lacking maritime experience. Like Requesens, Doria was also reluctant to launch a campaign in the late summer weather. Ultimately, events led to the Battle of Lepanto, where he commanded the Christian right wing. According to some sources, Doria was who advised John of Austria to saw off the long bow of the galleys in order to fire their guns at a lower angle. During the battle, however, Doria had the misfortune of facing the most experienced Turkish admiral, Occhiali, who also commanded nearly twice as many ships as he did in his wing.

Bust of Giovanni Andrea Doria by Pompeo Leoni.

The Genoese commander saw the Ottoman extending his line toward the open sea, so he followed suit, presumably to prevent the Christian fleet from being outflanked on the right. However, his maneuver opened a gap between his force and the Christian center, which allowed Occhiali to break through, likely the outcome the skilled Ottoman had sought from the start. Doria's move also fortuitously hindered the support of the two galleasses on his wing, which had not been deployed earlier, perhaps due to a lack of time. The Maltese galleys in the center, commanded by Pietro Giustiniani, came under heavy attack, and the entire battle might have been lost had Cardona not arrived with several galleys, followed by Bazán with the rear squadron to close the gap. Doria himself, realizing his error, ordered his ships to turn about and strike Occhiali on the flank. Hemmed in by Spaniards and Genoese, the Turk fled to avoid being encircled, thereby sealing the Christian victory.

His actions at the battle were poorly received amidst the victory celebrations; the fact that his squadron emerged with the least damage, fueling all manner of rumors, only compounded the issue. It was insinuated that Doria had abandoned the Christian fleet to save his own squad, or even that he was acting on a secret agenda. The Pope branded him a traitor, vowing to have him executed should he set foot in papal territories, and urged Philip II to terminate all naval contracts with him. However, Requesens defended Doria's actions, noting that the Genoese had previously informed him of his intention to extend the line to the right and had complained that not all the galleys in his squadron were keeping pace, which was the actual issue affecting the maneuver. Regardless, the Holy See was disappointed and lobbied for his replacement by his uncle and rival Antonio Doria, even though John of Austria interceded on his behalf. Doria himself would go on to write reports attempting to justify his battle plan.

Historiography is divided on this matter. Doria has variously accused of cowardice, incompetence, or acting purposefully out of self-interest. He has been accused of sacrificing the entire Christian fleet to save his own private galleys, or of having reached some sort of secret agreement with Occhiali. Modern authors have been more skeptical, noting that his private galleys were actually distributed throughout the fleet and that a pact would have been difficult to arrange, given that Ottoman spies did not appear to know Doria was going to command a wing. Barbero and Anderson believe Doria was simply outmaneuvered by the experienced Occhiali, who also commanded a numerically superior squadron. Likewise, Barbero and Capponi cite witnesses to the battle stating that several Venetian galleys disobeyed Doria to join the fighting in the center, thereby worsening the situation, and that Giovanni's late return was actually vital for neutralizing Occhiali. Duro also ruled out the common Venetian accusation—that Philip II had ordered Doria to sabotage the battle solely to harm Venice.

=== Last campaigns ===
The following year, Doria was ordered to stay in Sicily with a reserve while Don John rendezvoused with the rest of Holy League in Greece, where they had fought the skirmish at Cerigo Channel. After the siege of Navarino, the new Spanish lieutenant, Gonzalo Fernández de Córdoba, took Doria and a small reinforcement fleet to Gomenizza, but there they found out the campaign had been closed without success. The Holy League disbanded shortly after.

== Late career ==
In 1573, John of Austria summoned Giovanni and his brother Pagano to take part in the capture Tunis, an operation carried out easily. Upon their return, the political situation in Genoa had once again become complicated. The new nobility was gaining power at the expense of old, pro-Spanish families like theirs, to the point that Doria contacted Don John to plan a military intervention in the Republic should the situation become desperate. Pagano, a captain in the tercio infantry, had remained with the garrison in Tunis and fell in battle when the Turks recaptured the stronghold the following year; Don John and Giovanni were unable to come to their aid due to logistical difficulties and bad weather.

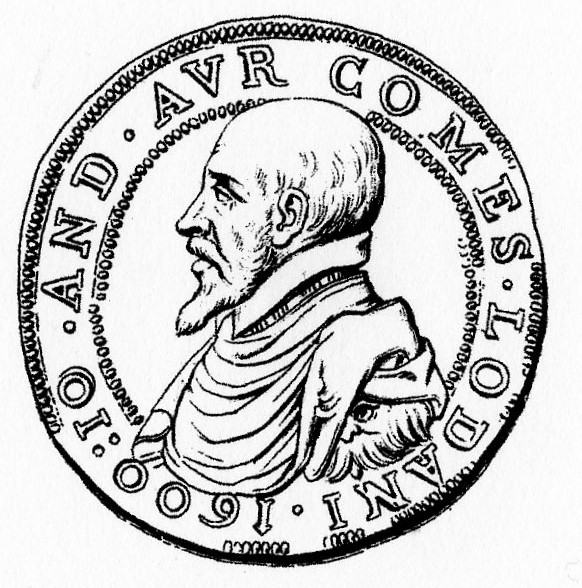
Sigil of Giovanni Andrea Doria in 1600.

By 1575, growing factionalism in Genoa had reached such a pitch that a civil war with the pro-French elements was foreseeable. Giovanni and Don John of Austria had each prepared a fleet to intervene in Genoa, coordinating with Antonio to block the shipment of supplies from Naples as a means of exerting pressure, and troops were even deployed to contain the insurgent faction. However, a negotiated solution was found to the Republic's problems, and it remained within the Spanish political spere. Doria played a pivotal role in this political achievement by winning over the city's guilds, discrediting the coup plotters, and reaffirming the principle of equality among the various noble factions that had prevailed since the reforms of his uncle Andrea.

This coincided with a marked rise in his standing at the imperial court. His ships aided the fight against Barbary corsairs and facilitated the transport of troops and funds to the armies fighting in the Dutch Revolt, a campaign then led by John of Austria himself, in close correspondence with Doria. However, his military role had diminished, as warfare in the Mediterranean had diminished following the victory at Lepanto, and his galleys were ill-suited to navigate the Atlantic, where new wars were raging. In 1582, he sold nearly all his galleys to Spain and, with the backing of Cardinal Granvelle, got to be appointed Captain General of the Sea, the very post once held by John of Austria and other high-ranking commanders. Ironically, this shift led to friction with the citizens of Genoa, who accused him of arrogance and authoritarianism in his new role, although his local power remained unrivaled, even controlling the election of the doges.

In 1586, he acted as a diplomat with England, where the Genoese renegade Orazio Pallavicino attempted to negotiate an end to the Anglo-Spanish War with him. Doria replied that there could be no peace as long as Francis Drake's raids continued. By 1594, however, his health was no longer sufficient for the demands of his command, and he requested to step down. Although his resignation was not granted, he was compensated with a seat on the Council of State and the rank of knight commander in the Order of Santiago. At that time, Doria was at the pinnacle of his wealth and international political influence.

Upon the king's death, Doria continued his role at the court of Philip III, although he requested retirement due to his further declining health, only to be denied again. In 1600, he helped expel the pro-French Goffredo Lomellini from Genoa, and the following year, under the auspices of the Duke of Lerma, he organized an attempt to conquer Algiers, a center of Barbary piracy. Although he set sail with a force of 70 galleys and 10,000 men, he was forced to abort the plan just outside the city after a massive storm compelled the fleet to return to port. Weary after this fiasco, he again asked to be relieved of his post as Captain General, and this time his request was granted. In the ensuing years, he engaged in political intervention in Monaco on Spain's behalf.

== Marriages and children ==
He married firstly, in 1558, Zenobia del Carretto (1540–1590) and had:

- Andrea Doria (born and died 1565).
- Andrea Doria (born and died 1566).
- Andrea Doria (born and died 1567).
- Andrea Doria (born and died 1568).
- Vittoria Doria (1569–1618), married Ferrante II Gonzaga, Duke of Guastalla, had issue.
- Andrea II Doria (1570–1629), 3rd prince of Melfi, married Giovanna Colonna and had issue.
- Giovanni Doria (1573–1642) called Giannettino; Cardinal, Archbishop of Thessalonica and Palermo, Viceroy of Sicily
- Artemisia Doria (1574–1644), married Carlos Francisco de Borgia 7th Duke of Gandia, had issue.
- Carlo Doria (1576–1650), duke of Tursi, married Placidia Spinola, had issue.

He married secondly and secretly in 1590 with Baroness Katharina of Lysfelt and Harem (1564–1606), natural and legitimate daughter of Eric II, Duke of Brunswick-Lüneburg.

== Bibliography ==
- Allen, Bruce Ware (2017). The Great Siege of Malta: The Epic Battle Between the Ottoman Empire and the Knights of St. John. University Press of New England. ISBN 9781512601169.
- Anderson, Roger Charles (1952). Naval wars in the Levant, 1559-1853. Princeton University Press.
- Barbero, Alessandro (2010). Lepanto. La battaglia dei tre imperi. Laterza. ISBN 88-420-8893-5.
- Capponi, Niccolo (2012). Lepanto 1571. La Lega santa contro l'Impero ottomano. Saggiatore. ISBN 978-88-565-0202-2.
- Bracco, Raffaele (1960). Il principe Giannandrea Doria: patriae libertatis conservator, conte di Loano, fondatore di S. Agostino. Genoa.
- Fernández Duro, Cesáreo (1896). Armada Española, desde la unión de los reinos de Castilla y Aragón, tomo II. Madrid: Instituto de Historia Naval.
- Capponi, Niccolo (2006). Victory of the West. ISBN 978-0-306-81544-7.
- Rosell, Cayetano (1853). Historia del combate naval de Lepanto. Real Academia de la Historia.
- Sánchez, Miguel (1868). Felipe II y la Liga de 1571 contra el Turco. Indicador de los Caminos de Hierro.
- Tzavaras, Andrew J. (2025). Duke Cosimo I, the Medici Navy and the Italian Wars (c.1544–1563). Brill. ISBN 9789004747913.
- Geneanet
