= Villamayor de Santiago =

Villamayor de Santiago, Spain
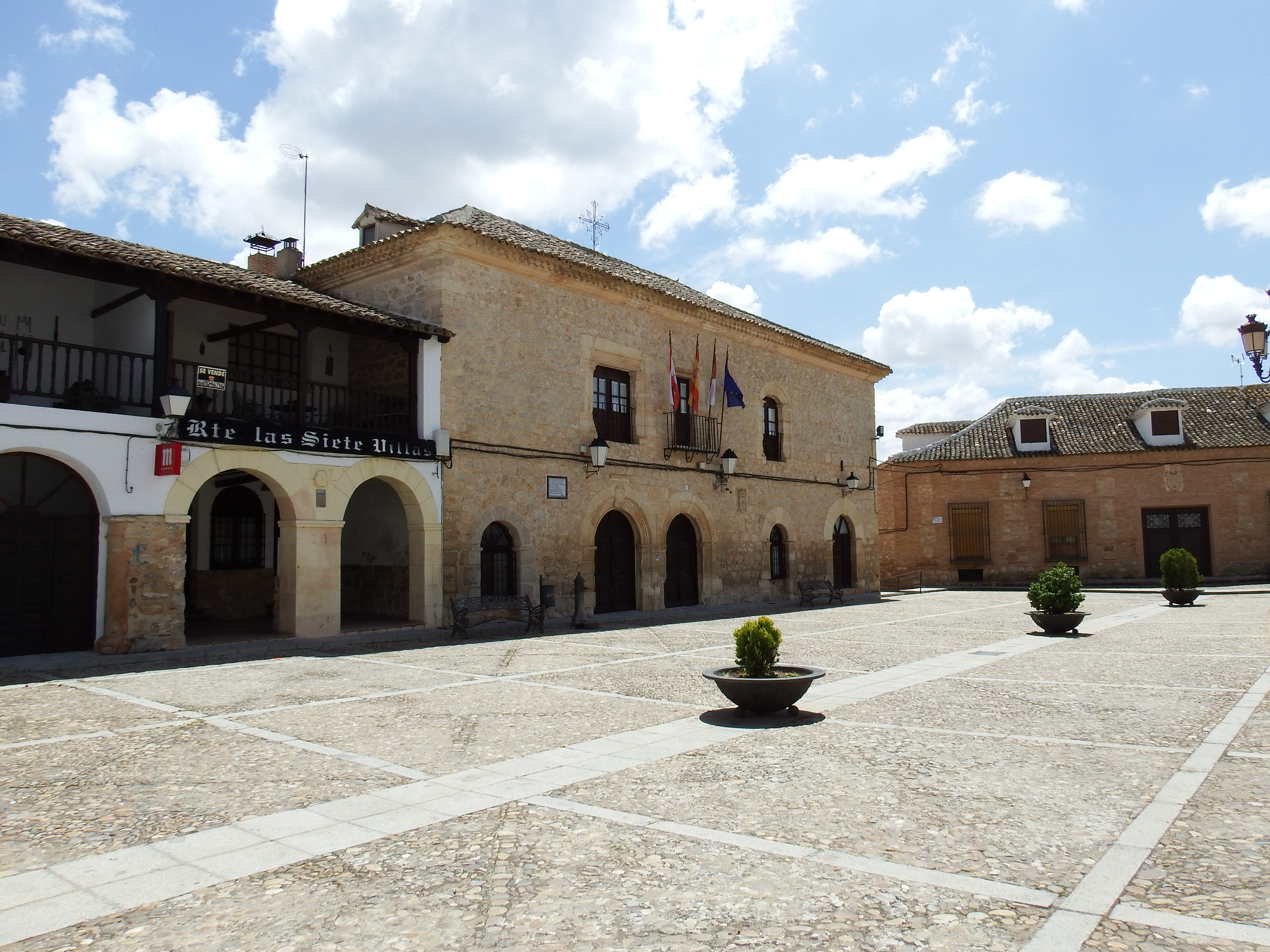
- Villamayor de Santiago Main Square

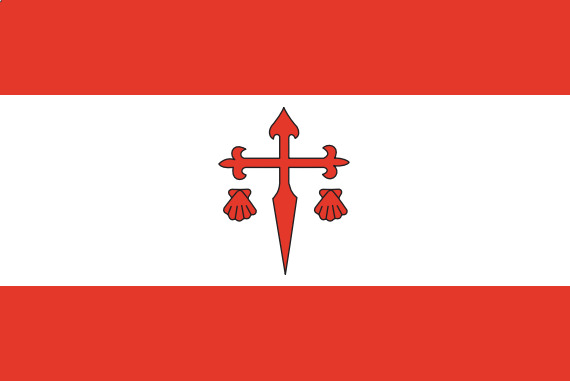
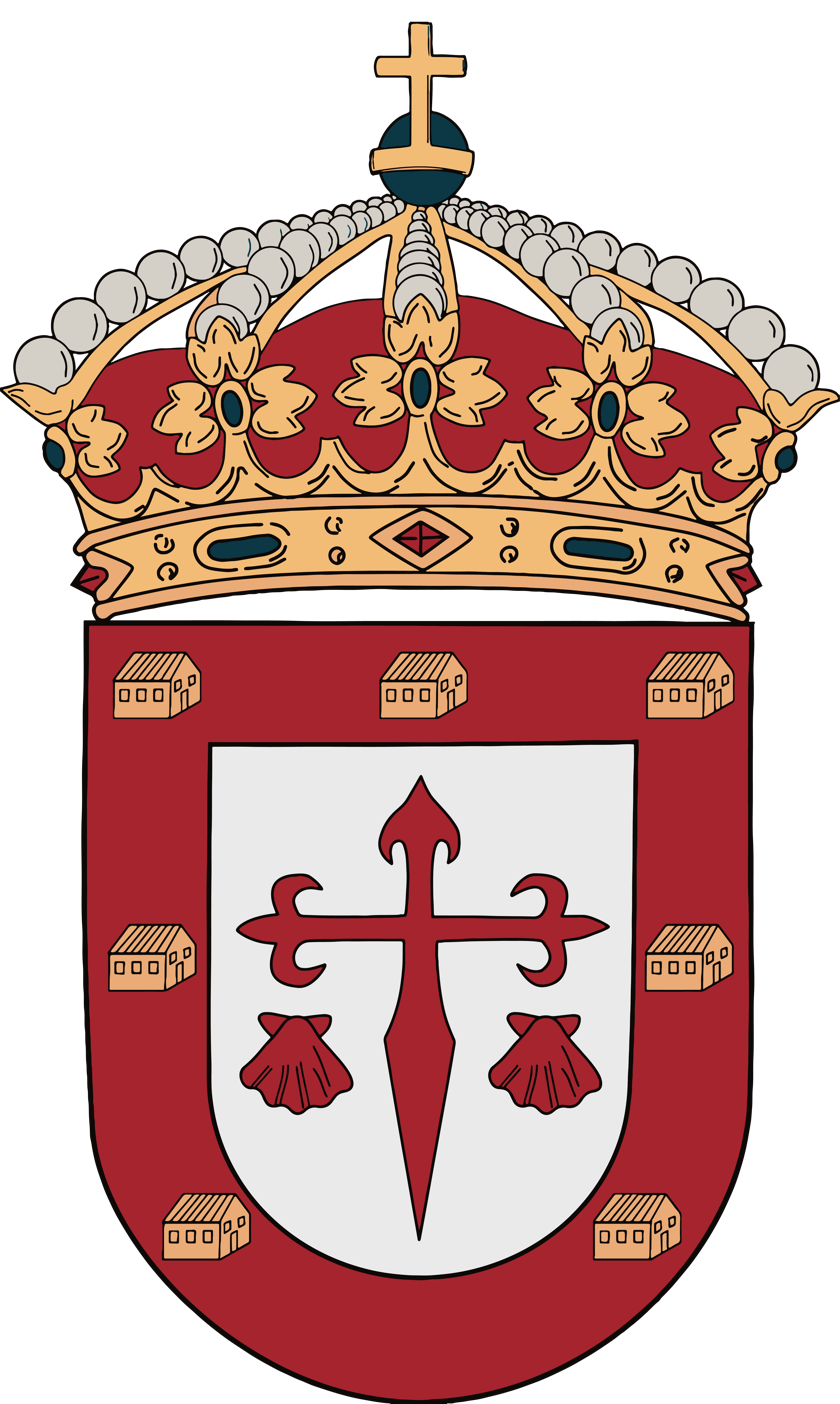
- Flag Coat of arms

- Location within Spain Location within Castilla-La Mancha
- Coordinates: 39°44′N 2°55′W
- Country: Spain
- Autonomous community: Castile-La Mancha
- Province: Cuenca
- Municipality: Villamayor de Santiago

Area
  - Total: 180 km^{2} (69 sq mi)

Population (2025-01-01)
  - Total: 2,336
  - Density: 13/km^{2} (34/sq mi)
- Time zone: UTC+1 (CET)
  - Summer (DST): UTC+2 (CEST)

Villamayor de Santiago is a municipality located in the province of Cuenca, Castile-La Mancha, Spain. According to the 2004 census (INE), the municipality has a population of 2,741 inhabitants.
