= Marquess of Santa Cruz =

Marquess of Santa Cruz was a noble title in two countries and Marquise of Santa Cruz in one.

== Brazil ==
Romualdo Antônio de Seixas (1787–1860) was the first and only Count and Marquess of Santa Cruz.

== Portugal ==
The feminized title was created by John V of Portugal by decree in 1691 for Teresa de Moscoso Osório

== Spain ==
Spanish variations include:

- Marquess of Santa Cruz.
- Marquess of Santa Cruz de Aguirre.
- Marquess of Santa Cruz de Marcenado.
- Marquess of Santa Cruz de Ribaduya.
- Marquess of Santa Cruz del Viso.

== See also ==
- Count of Santa Cruz
- Duke of Santa Cruz
