= Valdefuentes, Cáceres =

Coordinates: 39°17′0″N 6°7′0″W

Valdefuentes, Spain
- municipality
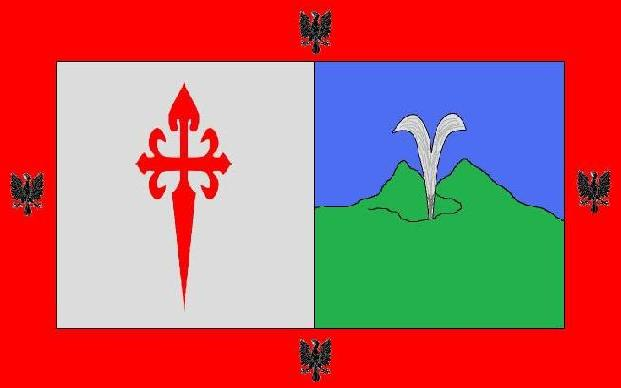
- Flag Coat of arms
- Interactive map of Valdefuentes, Spain
- Country: Spain
- Autonomous community: Extremadura
- Province: Cáceres
- Municipality: Valdefuentes

Area
  - Total: 27 km^{2} (10 sq mi)
- Elevation: 484 m (1,588 ft)

Population (2025-01-01)
  - Total: 1,074
  - Density: 40/km^{2} (100/sq mi)
- Time zone: UTC+1 (CET)
  - Summer (DST): UTC+2 (CEST)

Valdefuentes is a municipality located in the province of Cáceres, Extremadura, Spain. According to the 2006 census (INE), the municipality has a population of 1489 inhabitants.

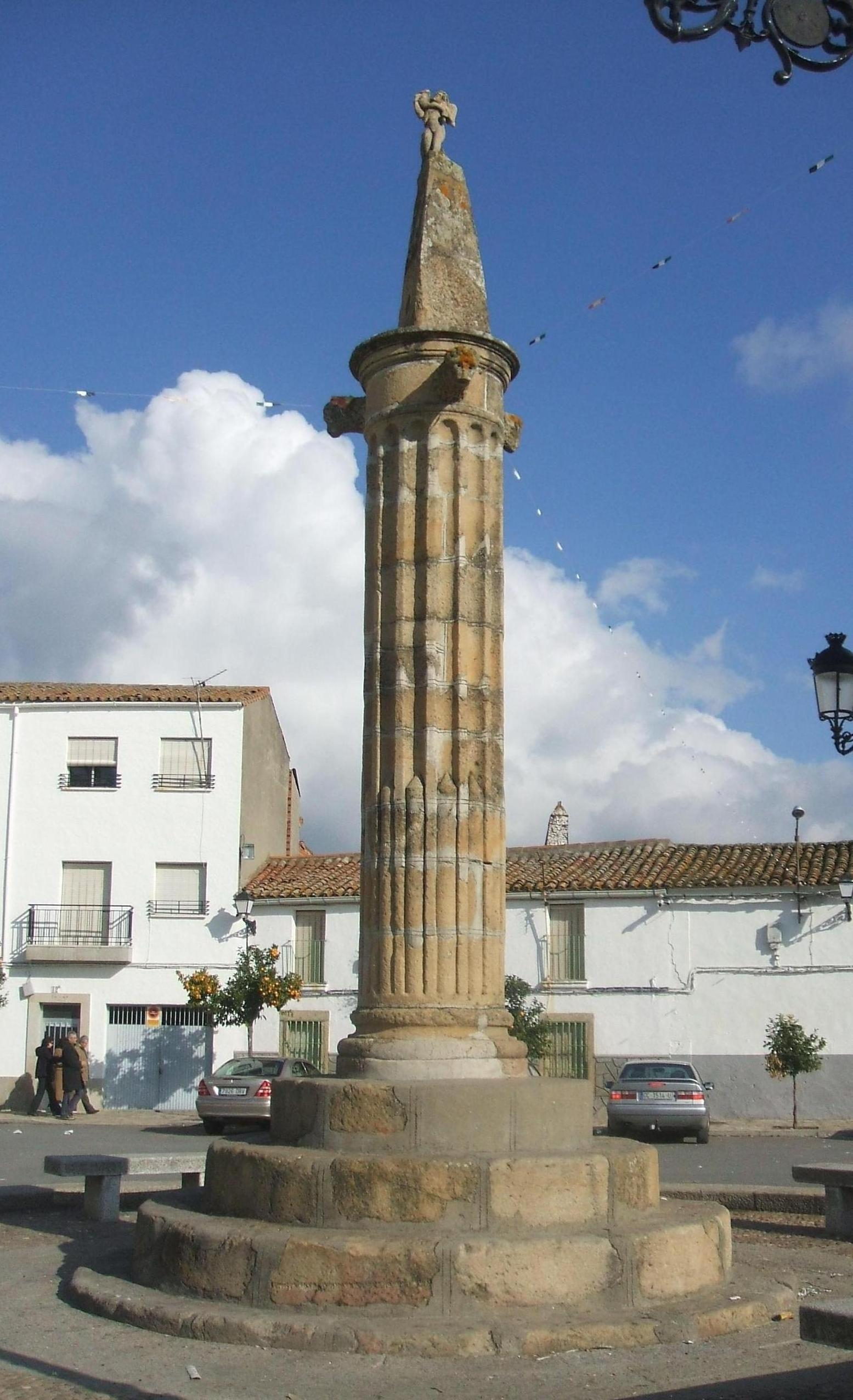
Valdefuentes Main Square

== See also ==
- List of municipalities in Cáceres
