= Peñón de Vélez de la Gomera expedition (1525) =

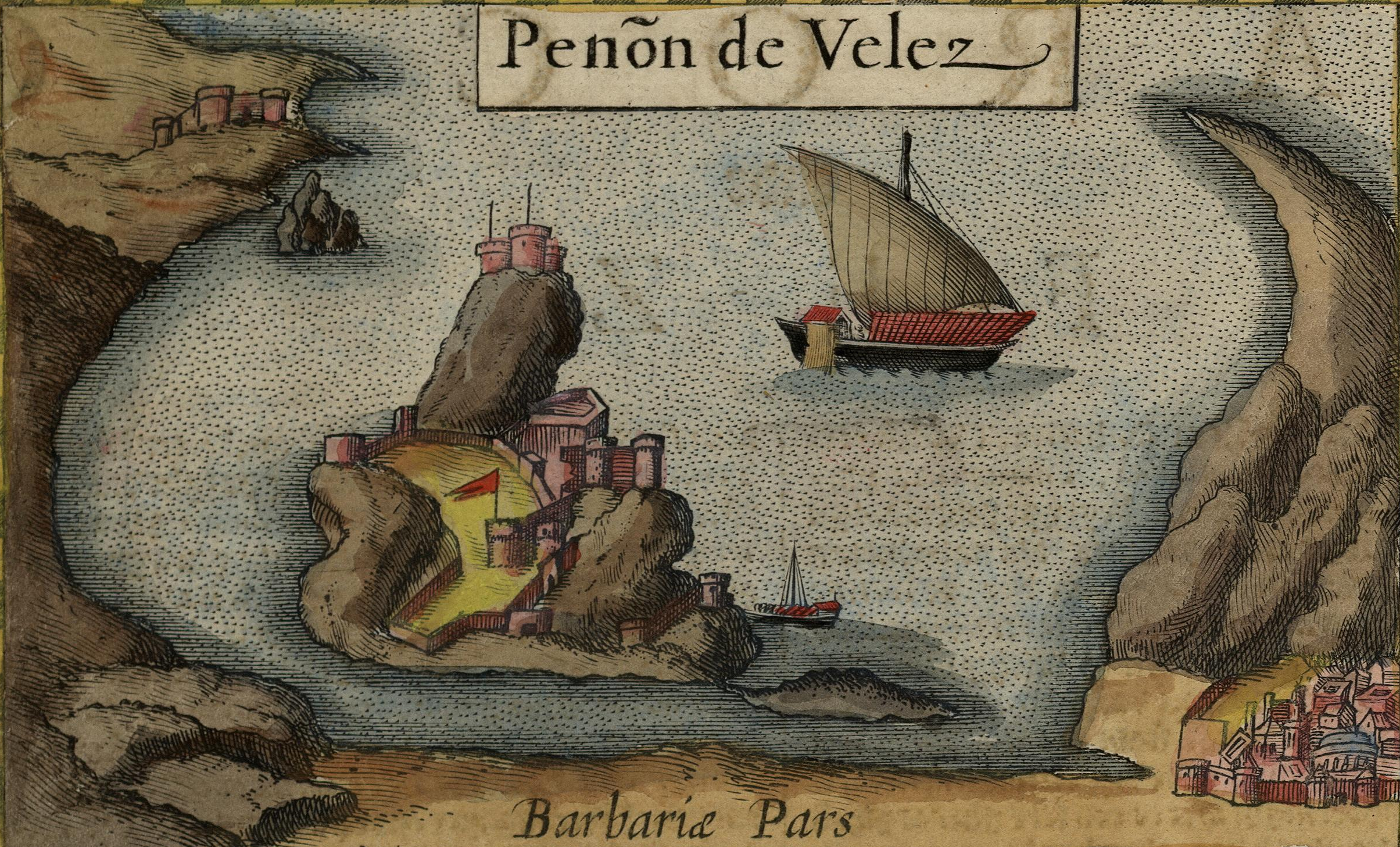
- Peñón de Vélez de la Gomera in early 17th century
Date	October 1525
Location	Peñón de Vélez de la Gomera
Result	Wattasid victory

Belligerents
(Spain) Spanish Empire	Wattasid dynasty

Commanders and leaders
(Spain) Luis Hurtado de Mendoza	Unknown

Strength
1,500 men 70 ships	Unknown

Casualties and losses
Heavy	Unknown

In 1525, a Spanish military expedition was launched to reconquer the exclave of Peñón de Vélez de la Gomera, which was taken by the Wattasids in 1522. The campaign ended in a fiasco for the Spanish troops.

== History ==
In 1508, the Spanish general, Pedro Navarro, captured the islet of Peñón de Vélez de la Gomera while combating barbary corsairs. Gomera possessed a strategic location and its capture posed a threat to the Badis Berbers. It was fortified place and a shipyard for Barbary and Ottoman corsairs. In December 22, 1522, the Wattasid recovered the islet and put the entire garrison to sword, including their governor, Juan de Villalobos. The Spanish saw a fleet and thought it was their own, opening their gate to the fleet and discovering it was a Wattassid fleet.

In 1525, the Marquis of Mondejar, Luis Hurtado de Mendoza, obtained permission from Charles V to recover the islet, to which he agreed. Luis came with 70 ships and 1,500 men. The plan was to capture the islet at night; however, the Spanish arrived before night fell. The Wattasids were warned of the upcoming expedition and prepared themselves. As the Spanish troops were landing, the Wattasids attacked them with vigor, putting them on route. The Wattasids also used their artillery to damage their ships. Luis, who was on his ship near the coast, saw the massacre and could do nothing to help the landing forces.

Many Spanish knights were killed, including Juan Hurtado de Mendoza, Garica de Guzman, Gonzalo de Medrano, and other knights.

== Sources ==
- Magdalena de Pazzis Pi Corrales (2019), Tercios del mar, History of the first Spanish Marine Infantry (In Spanish).
- Enrique García Hernan (2006), War and society in the Hispanic monarchy, politics, strategy and culture in Modern Europe, 1500-1700 (In Spanish), Vol I .
- Juan Antonio Vilar Sánchez (2000), 1526, boda y luna de miel del emperador Carlos V: la visita imperial a Andalucía y al reino de Granada.
