= Álvaro de Sande =

Spanish nobleman and military leader (1489–1573)

- Born: 1489; Cáceres, Spain
- Died: 1573 (aged 83–84); Duchy of Milan
- Military career
- Allegiance: Spanish Empire
- Branch: Navy; Army
- Service years: 1535-1573
- Rank: Maestre de campo
- Awards: Order of Santiago

Álvaro de Sande (1489 – 20 October 1573) was a Spanish nobleman and military leader. For his successes in the Italian Wars and the first Ottoman–Habsburg wars, he was made lord of Valdefuentes and the first Maquis of Piovera.

He served a grueling and lengthy career under Emperor Charles V and King Philip II, eventually finishing his military tenure in his seventies while still in active service. He became famous for his experience, toughness and love for fighting.

== Biography ==
He was born in Cáceres, the son of Don Juan de Sande, second señor de Valhondo. Don Alvaro de Sande participated in numerous campaigns in the Spanish Army, including the Conquest of Tunis (1535), the conquest of Düren and Roermond in 1543, the siege of Saint-Dizier in 1544, and the grand Battle of Mühlberg in 1549, in which Sande distinguished himself. When the German Campaign ended, Sande fought in the Italian War of 1551–1559 against France in the Tercios of Milan.

Despite his advanced age, he participated in 1560 in the Battle of Djerba against the Turks, which ended in disaster. After the sea battle, the surviving soldiers took refuge in the fort they had completed just days earlier. When Giovanni Andrea Doria managed to escape in a small vessel, de Sande became commander of the force in the fort, which was soon attacked by the combined forces of Piyale Pasha and Turgut Reis. After a siege of three months, the garrison surrendered and 5,000 prisoners, including Alvaro de Sande, were carried back to Istanbul.

Coat of arms of Alvaro de Sande, marquess of the Piovera.

After 2 years, de Sande was ransomed for 60,000 escudos and returned to Spain. The Holy Roman Empire's ambassador to Constantinople, Ogier de Busbecq, assisted the Spanish prisoners held by the Turks and was involved in securing de Sande's release. The two men travelled together as far as Vienna in the autumn of 1562. De Sande fought against the Turks again at the Siege of Malta in 1565.

Álvaro de Sande received Valdefuentes from King Philip II and was made first Marqués de la Piovera. He became interim Governor of the Duchy of Milan on 21 August 1571, a position that he held until 7 April 1572.

He married Antonia de Guzmán and had a son, Rodrigo de Sande, 2nd marqués de la Piovera. He died in Milan.

== Sources ==
- El Periodico Extremadura (Spanish)
- GeneAll.net
- Allen, Bruce Ware (2015). The Great Siege of Malta: The Epic Battle between the Ottoman Empire and the Knights of St. John. University Press of New England. ISBN 978-1-61168-843-6.

Political offices
| Preceded by Gabriel de la Cueva, 5th Duke of Alburquerque | Governor of the Duchy of Milan; 1571–1572 | Succeeded by Luis de Requesens y Zúñiga |
