= Battle of Gibraltar (1563) =

Naval battle between a Spanish and English fleets

Date	November 23th, 1563
Location	Gibraltar, Spain
Result	Spanish victory

Belligerents
Spain	England

Commanders and leaders
Álvaro de Bazán	Unknown

Strength
5 galleys	8 naos

Casualties and losses
Minor	All vessels captured 240 prisoners

The 1563 Battle of Gibraltar was a naval battle between an English fleet and the Spanish garrison of the Fortress of Gibraltar led by Álvaro de Bazán, Marquis of Santa Cruz.

== Background ==
In summer 1563, Mayor of Melilla Pedro Venegas promoted an attempt to conquer Peñón de Vélez de la Gomera from Muslim hands, which fell on captain Sancho de Leyva, recently arrived from his imprisonment in Constantinople after the Battle of Djerba. Leyva disagreed with the approach planned by Venegas, but nonetheless carried on along with Álvaro de Bazán, deployed from Gibraltar, on July 23. The resultant expedition was a failure, with Bazán being forced to cover their retreat twice and proposing tactical plans that were never followed. The fiasco encouraged enemy ships to operate in Spanish waters.

Mere months after Bazán's return to Spain, a fleet of eight English ships attacked French merchant vessel in midst of the harbour of Gibraltar. The French ship was heavily damaged by cannonfire, but managed to escape by taking refuge under the fortress of El Puerto de Santa María. This was considered a breaking of the peace treaty between Spain and England, and a Spanish alguacil attempted to intervene diplomatically only to be taken hostage by the English. Warned of the incident, Bazán prepared five galleys and sailed off against them.

== Battle ==
On November 23, Bazán caught the English fleet around the Gibraltar promontory. The English adopted order of battle and disobeyed the order to stop, moving the Spanish to open fire. The two fleets exchanged artillery, but although Bazán's flotilla only loaded 25 cannons against the 200 pieces of the English, he ultimately overpowered and boarded them, resulting in all of the eight English ships being captured. After being registered, Spanish goods like cazabe de yuca and sugar from the Indies were found in them, and witnesses saw them throw overboard further incriminating cargo before being caught.

== Aftermath ==
The 240 prisoners were condemned to row in galleys. In January 1564, English ambassador Sir Thomas Chaloner tried to intercede for them, claiming them to be merchants who had been attacked first by the French, and further claiming to be false that they resisted to the arrest, but it was of no avail. However, he also sent letters to the prisoners reprimanding them for causing a diplomatic incident, and warned Queen Elizabeth I that the actions of English adventurers was to blame. Finally, on June 28, 1564, King Philip II ordered the prisoners who remained alive to be freed, along with another English who had attacked Galicia before being captured in San Sebastián. Bazán was later recalled to Biscay to gather reinforcements against an oncoming Ottoman naval campaign.

== Bibliography ==
- Altoaguirre y Duvale, Ángel de. Don Álvaro de Bazán. Primer marqués de Santa Cruz de Mudela. Estudio Histórico-Biográfico. Tipografía de los Huérfanos. Madrid, MDCCCLXXXVIII.
- Cervera Pery, José. Don Álvaro de Bazán. El gran marino de España. Empresa Nacional Bazán. Madrid, 1988.
- Cervera Pery, José. La Estrategia Naval del Imperio. Auge, declive y ocaso de la Marina de los Austrias. San Martín. Madrid, 1982. Premio Virgen del Carmen de 1981.
- Fernández Duro, Cesáreo. La Armada Española desde la unión de los reinos de Castilla y Aragón. Est. Tipográfico «Sucesores de Rivadeneyra» 9 volumes. Madrid, 1895–1903.
- Herrera Oria, S. J. Enrique. Felipe II y el Marqués de Santa Cruz en la Empresa de Inglaterra. Según los documentos del Archivo de Simancas. Instituto Histórico de Marina. Madrid, 1946.
