= Conquest of the Peñón de Vélez de la Gomera (1508) =

Date	23 July 1508
Location	Peñón de Vélez de la Gomera
Result	Spanish victory

Belligerents
Hispanic Monarchy	Emirate of Badis

Commanders and leaders
Pedro Navarro	Muley Mançor

The first conquest of the Peñón de Vélez de la Gomera was undertaken on 23 July 1508 by a Spanish fleet under the command of Pedro Navarro.

== History ==
By the early 16th century the territory of Badis and its surroundings was ruled by Muley Mançor (name in the Spanish chronicles), a Wattasid governor (cousin of the Sultan in Fez) who signed in January 1508 an agreement with the Republic of Venice to declare the independence from Fez (although according to the account of Hernando de Zafra there was already a "king" in Badis by 1492). Badis was a corsair nest accused of raiding the coastline of Granada; and, thus, a Spanish argument on the need to build a fortress in the neighboring rock presiding over the cove of Badis in order to manage the problem with the fustas emerged. During the reign/regency of Ferdinand, following the termination of negotiations with the ruler in Badis, Pedro Navarro, who was the leader of a flotilla docked in Málaga as it was to take part in the mission to conquer Oran, proceeded to take the rock in 1508. As any presence in the rock fled once the flotilla approached, Navarro occupied it on 23 July 1508 and installed troops and artillery before leaving with the flotilla.

== Aftermath ==
As Badis was located in the Portuguese area of influence in the North-African coast, there was conflict with the Kingdom of Portugal, but, following the Spanish assistance to the Portuguese in Arcila, King Manuel I of Portugal agreed to the Spanish conquest in late 1508; this was formally ratified and enshrined in the 1509 Treaty of Sintra. Also in 1509, after the Spanish conquest of Oran, the emir of Badis resumed negotiations with the Hispanic Monarchy. In any case, the cannons installed in the rock proved ineffective as, lacking range, they were unable to deter the movement of the fustas in and out the cove of Badis. The rock was lost in 1522 and, having become a dangerous Ottoman base, the Saadi sultan evacuated its Moroccan inhabitants and handed it over to the Spaniards in 1564.

== Bibliography ==
- Colin, G.S. (1986) [1960]. "Bādis". In Bearman, P.; Bianquis, Th.; Bosworth, C.E.; van Donzel, E.; Heinrichs, W.P. (eds.). Encyclopaedia of Islam. Vol. I (2nd ed.). Leiden, Netherlands: Brill Publishers. p. 859. doi:10.1163/1573-3912_islam_SIM_0995. ISBN 9004081143.
- López de Coca Castañer, José Enrique (2018). "Sobre la política norteafricana de los Reyes Católicos: los principados de Badis, Chauen y Tetuán (1491–1515)". En la España Medieval. 41 (18). Madrid: Ediciones Complutense: 199–225. doi:10.5209/ELEM.60009. ISSN 0214-3038.
- Quirós Linares, Francisco (1998). "Los peñones de Vélez de la Gomera y Alhucemas y las Islas Chafarinas" (PDF). Ería: Revista cuatrimestral de geografía (45). Oviedo: Universidad de Oviedo: 54–66. ISSN 0211-0563.
