= 1543 =

1543 in various calendars
- Gregorian calendar: 1543; MDXLIII
- Ab urbe condita: 2296
- Armenian calendar: 992; ԹՎ ՋՂԲ
- Assyrian calendar: 6293
- Balinese saka calendar: 1464–1465
- Bengali calendar: 949–950
- Berber calendar: 2493
- English Regnal year: 34 Hen. 8 – 35 Hen. 8
- Buddhist calendar: 2087
- Burmese calendar: 905
- Byzantine calendar: 7051–7052
- Chinese calendar: 壬寅年 (Water Tiger); 4240 or 4033 — to — 癸卯年 (Water Rabbit); 4241 or 4034
- Coptic calendar: 1259–1260
- Discordian calendar: 2709
- Ethiopian calendar: 1535–1536
- Hebrew calendar: 5303–5304
- Hindu calendars
- Vikram Samvat: 1599–1600
- Shaka Samvat: 1464–1465
- Kali Yuga: 4643–4644
- Holocene calendar: 11543
- Igbo calendar: 543–544
- Iranian calendar: 921–922
- Islamic calendar: 949–950
- Japanese calendar: Tenbun 12 (天文１２年)
- Javanese calendar: 1461–1462
- Julian calendar: 1543; MDXLIII
- Korean calendar: 3876
- Minguo calendar: 369 before ROC 民前369年
- Nanakshahi calendar: 75
- Thai solar calendar: 2085–2086
- Tibetan calendar: ཆུ་ཕོ་སྟག་ལོ་ (male Water-Tiger); 1669 or 1288 or 516 — to — ཆུ་མོ་ཡོས་ལོ་ (female Water-Hare); 1670 or 1289 or 517

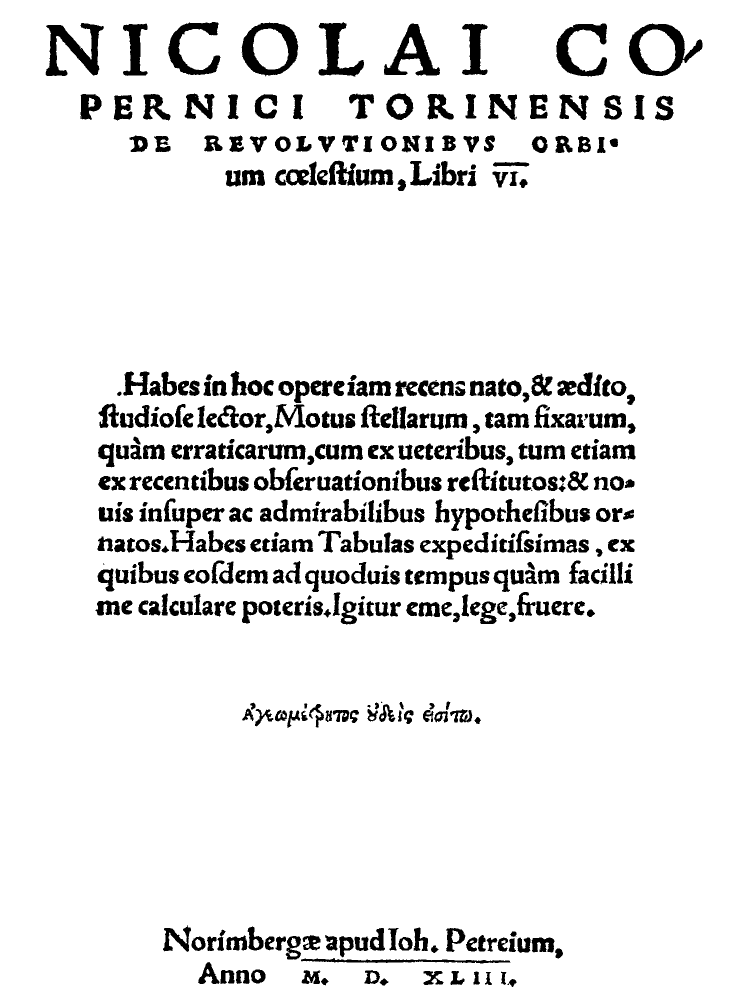
May: De revolutionibus orbi published by Copernicus

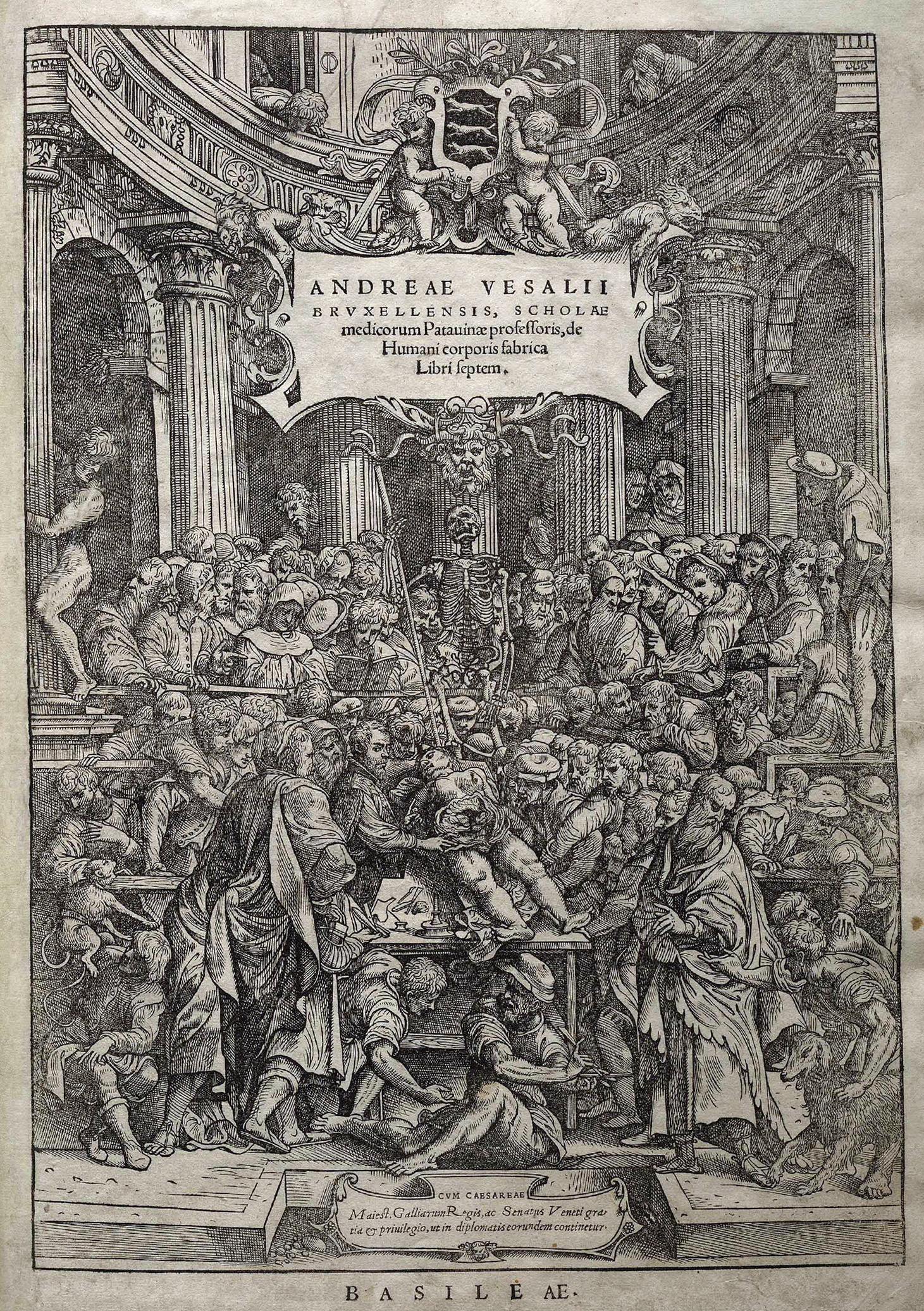
June: Humani corporis fabrica published by Vesalius

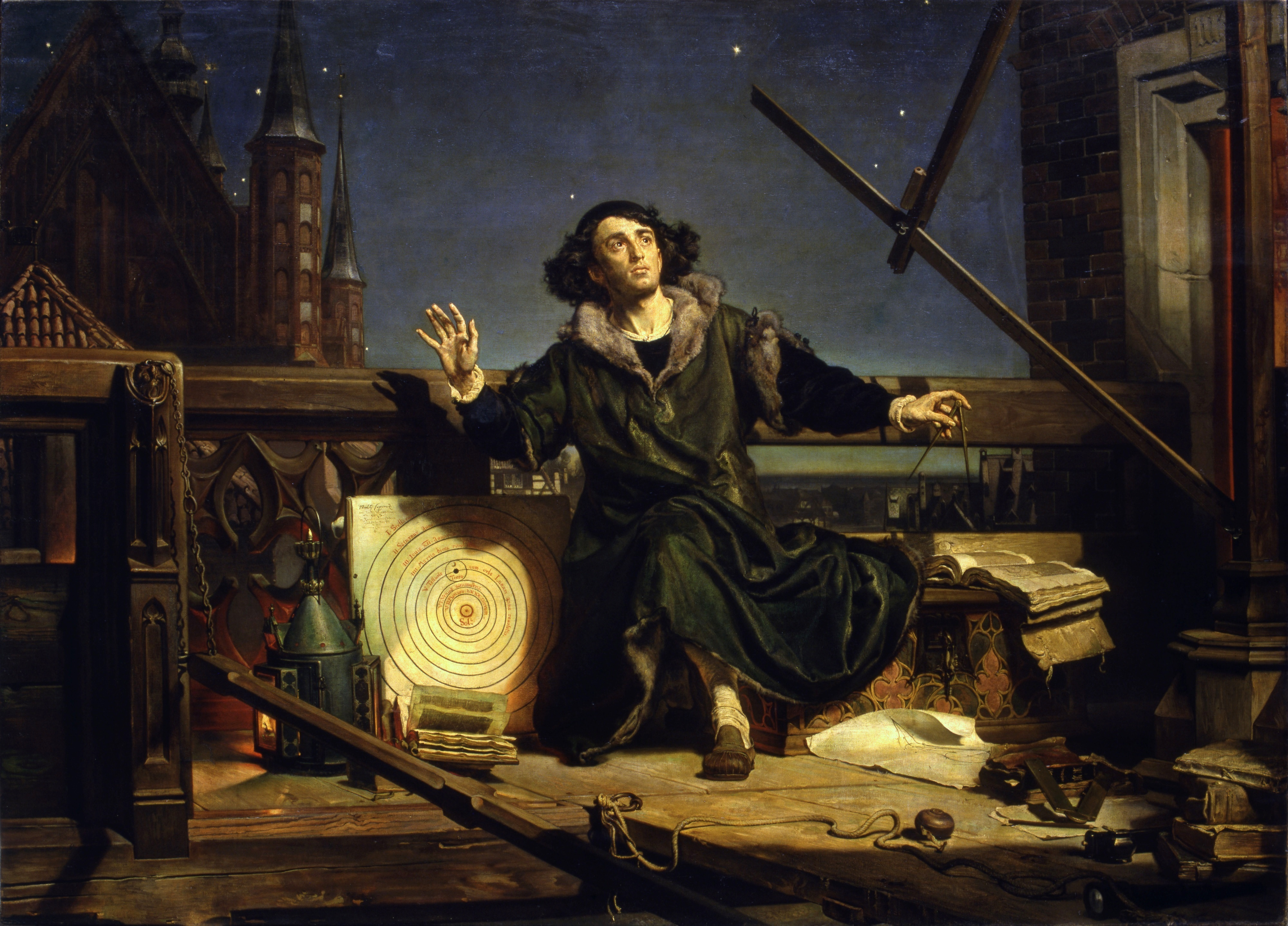
Nicolaus Copernicus

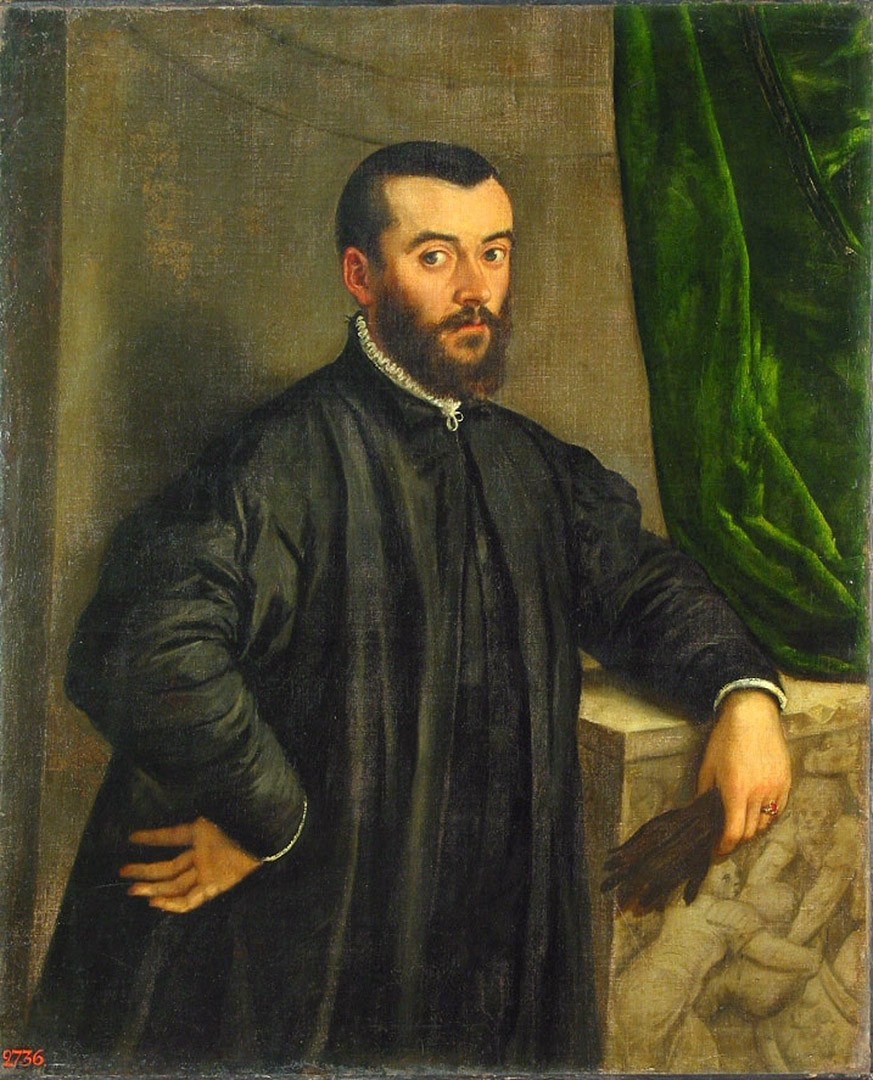
Andreas Vesalius

Year 1543 (MDXLIII) was a common year starting on Monday of the Julian calendar. It is one of the years sometimes referred to as an "Annus mirabilis" because of its significant publications in science, considered the start of the Scientific Revolution.

== Events ==
=== January–March ===
- January 4 – Andrea Centurione Pietrasanta begins a two-year term as the new Doge of the Republic of Genoa, replacing Leonardo Cattaneo della Volta.
- January 8 – The burial of King James V of Scotland is carried out at Holyrood Abbey.
- February 11 – King Henry VIII of England allies with Charles V, Holy Roman Emperor, against France.
- February 21 – Battle of Wayna Daga: A joint Ethiopian-Portuguese force of 8,500, under Emperor Gelawdewos of Ethiopia, defeats Imam Ahmad ibn Ibrahim al-Ghazi's army of over 14,000, ending the Ethiopian–Adal War.
- March 7 –
  - Abu Abdallah Muhammad VI is installed as the new ruler of the Kingdom of Tlemcen in modern-day Algeria, succeeding his brother Abu Zayyan III.
  - Massive flooding of the Mississippi River and the Arkansas River begins in southeastern North America over a 40 day period while Spanish explorer Hernando de Soto and his team are passing through. The event is noted by the chronicler of the DeSoto Expedition, Inca Garcilaso de la Vega.
- March 15 – James Hamilton, 2nd Earl of Arran, is elected by the Scottish Parliament as the Regent for the infant Mary Queen of Scots.
- March 18 – As flooding of the Mississippi continues De la Vega notes that today "while the Spaniards... were making a procession in honor of Our Redeemer's entrance into Jerusalem, the river entered the gates of the little village of Aminoya in the wildness and fury of its flood, and two days later on we could not pass through the streets except in canoes."
- March 20 – King Gustav of Sweden leads troops in troops crushing Dacke's Rebellion, led by Swedish peasant Nils Dacke, with defeat coming at the Battle of Hjortensjon.
- March 21 – In Nuremberg, De revolutionibus orbium coelestium (On the Revolutions of the Heavenly Spheres) is printed during the illness of Nicholas Copernicus, offering mathematical arguments for the existence of the heliocentric universe, denying the geocentric model. According to legend, Copernicus, who had a stroke in December, is presented a copy of the book on his deathbed shortly before dying on May 24 in Frombork at the age of 70.

=== April–June ===
- April 23 – Suleiman the Magnificent, Sultan of the Ottoman Empire, follows up on his 1541 annexation of Hungary by invading a second time to capture areas that had been taken by Archduke Ferdinand, including Esztergom.
- May 5 – Elizabeth of Austria, daughter of Archduke Ferdinand I, marries Sigismund II Augustus, King of Poland. Her coronation as Queen consort of Poland takes place three days later at Kraków Cathedral as the Archbishop of Gniezno, Piotr Gamrat, places the crown of Hedwig of Kalisz upon her head.
- May 12 –
  - King Henry VIII of England gives royal assent to numerous laws passed by parliament, including the Act for the Advancement of True Religion, restricting the reading of the Bible to clerics, noblemen, and upper class society. The Act will be repealed in 1547 during the reign of King Edward VI.
  - Laws in Wales Act 1542, second phase of the Consolidating Act of Welsh Union, is given royal assent, establishing counties and regularizing parliamentary representation in Wales.
- June 4 – Fabiano di Monte San Savinov leads 500 infantry men and some cavalry in an attempt to conquer the Republic of San Marino, but the group fails after getting lost in a dense fog on Saint Quirinus' Day.
- June 22 – King Henry VIII of England declares war on King Francis I of France, one month after sending an ultimatum.
- June – Andreas Vesalius publishes De humani corporis fabrica (On the Fabric of the Human Body), revolutionising the science of human anatomy.

=== July–September ===
- July 1 – The Treaty of Greenwich is signed between representatives of the Kingdoms of England and Scotland as part of a plan to eventually unify the two nations under one monarch. As part of the treaty, the two nations agree to avoid war during the reign of King Henry VIII in England or Mary, Queen of Scots in Scotland and for another year after both are gone. The second part of the Treaty provides that Mary, Queen of Scots (six months old at the time) will eventually become the wife of Crown Prince Edward (then 5 years old), son of King Henry VIII. The Scottish Parliament repudiates the treaty five months later.
- July 12 – King Henry VIII of England marries Catherine Parr. It is Henry's sixth and last marriage and Catherine's third. Princess Elizabeth attends the wedding. This month, the Parliament of England passes the Third Succession Act, restoring the Princesses Mary and Elizabeth, Henry's daughters, to the line of succession to the English throne.
- July 25–
  - The first large naval battle in the Atlantic Ocean, the Battle of Muros Bay, takes place off of the coast of Galicia in Spain between the French fleet and the Spanish fleet. Although France has the larger force, the Spanish Admiral Álvaro de Bazán identifies the flagship of French Admiral Jean de Clamorgan and sinks the vessel. Spain then captures the remaining 23 other ships and takes 3,000 prisoners, while France loses 3,000 dead and injured.
  - Suleiman the Magnificent, the Ottoman Sultan, begins the siege of the city of Esztergom in Hungary.
- August 6– The Siege of Nice by the Ottoman Empire and French forces (under the Franco-Ottoman alliance), led by Admiral Hayreddin Barbarossa, begins. At the time, the city is under the control of the Duchy of Savoy and is defended by the Savoyards, assisted by the Habsburg armies of Spain and the Holy Roman Empire. The siege lasts for 16 days.
- August 10 – Esztergom surrenders to the Ottomans led by Suleiman the Magnificent.
- August 22 – The city of Nice is captured by the Ottomans and Barbarossa after a long bombardment. The Ottomans pillage the city and take away 2,500 captives to be sold into slavery.
- August 25 – (24th day of 7th month of Tenbun 12) The first Europeans arrive in Japan and introduce firearms to the Asian monarchy, as the Chinese pirate Wang Zhi escorts Portuguese traders to in Tanegashima island in southern Kyushu. The first European visitors include António Mota, António Peixoto, Francisco Zeimoto, and Fernão Mendes Pinto.
- September 4 – Campaign of Suleiman: Suleiman the Magnificent captures the Hungarian coronation city of Székesfehérvár after a siege that had started on August 20. The city will be occupied by the Ottoman Empire for 145 years.
- September 9 – Mary Stuart is crowned the Queen of Scots in Stirling at the age of nine months old.
- September–October – Landrecies in Picardy is besieged by forces under Charles V, Holy Roman Emperor, but the siege is withdrawn on the approach of the French army.

=== October–December ===
- October 6 – In order to aid James Hamilton, Earl of Arran, Regent of Scotland, in his defense against challenger Matthew Stewart, 4th Earl of Lennox, King Francois of France arranges for two envoys, Jacques de La Brosse and Jacques Ménage to deliver money and munitions to Dumbarton Castle. The envoys unwittingly deliver Arran's materials to Lennox.
- November 16 – Suleiman, Sultan of the Ottoman Empire, completes his campaign to bring Hungary under Ottoman rule, having captured Esztergom, Székesfehérvár, Siklós and Szeged
- December 7 (11 waxing of Natdaw 905 ME) – The land and naval forces of the Confederation of Shan States (consisting of the principalities of Mohnyin, Mogaung, Bhamo, Momeik and Kale), led by Prince Sawlon of Mohnyin and King Hkonmaing, depart from the Shan capital, Awa, to start an invasion of the Toungoo Empire in upper Myanmar. The invaders easily overrun Toungoo and its capital at Prome a week later.
- December 11 – The Parliament of Scotland votes against ratifying the Treaty of Greenwich that had been signed with England on July 1.
- December 20 – The Eight Years War, also called the "War of Rough Wooing", begins as Scotland's Parliament votes to declare war on the Kingdom of England.
- December 31 – King Henry VIII of England signs an agreement with Charles V, Holy Roman Emperor to invade France by June 20, 1544 with at least 35,000 infantry and 7,000 cavalry.

=== Date unknown ===
- Martin Luther publishes On the Jews and Their Lies.
- Mikael Agricola publishes Abckiria.
- The Lighthouse of Genoa is completed in present form.
- Indians in the Spanish Empire are declared free, against the wishes of local settlers.

== Births ==
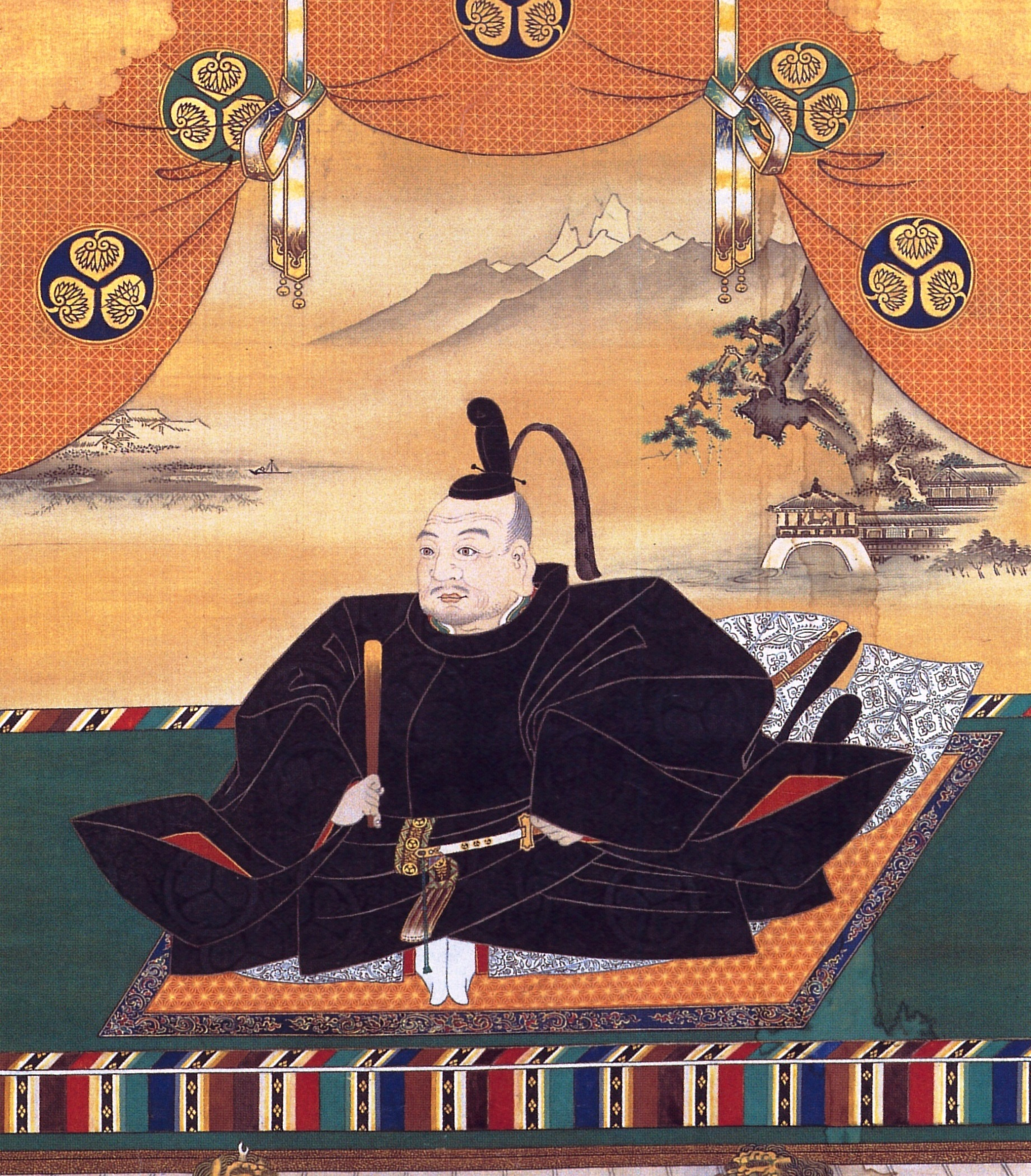
Tokugawa Ieyasu

- January 18 (baptized) – Alfonso Ferrabosco, Italian composer (d. 1588)
- January 31 – Tokugawa Ieyasu, Japanese shōgun (d. 1616)
- February 4 – Johannes Heurnius, Dutch physician (d. 1601)
- February 4 – Giovanni Francesco Fara, Italian writer (d. 1591)
- February 16 – Kanō Eitoku, Japanese painter (d. 1590)
- February 18 – Duke Charles III of Lorraine (d. 1608)
- February 25 – Sharaf Khan Bidlisi, Emir of Bitlis (d. 1603)
- March 7 – John Casimir of the Palatinate-Simmern, German prince and reigning count palatine of Simmern (d. 1592)
- April 1 – François de Bonne, Duke of Lesdiguières, Constable of France (d. 1626)
- April 11 – George John I, Count Palatine of Veldenz (d. 1592)
- May 2 – Jan Moretus, Belgian printer (d. 1610)
- June 8 – Petrus Albinus, German historian, local history researcher and poet (d. 1598)
- June 29 – Christine of Hesse, duchess consort of Holstein-Gottorp (1465-1486) (d. 1604)
- July 20 – Nils Svantesson Sture, Swedish diplomat (d. 1567)
- August 3 – Nicasius de Sille, Dutch diplomat (d. 1600)
- August 21 – Giovanni Bembo, Doge of Venice (d. 1618)
- September 14 – Claudio Acquaviva, Italian Jesuit (d. 1615)
- October 21 – Michael Hicks, English politician (d. 1612)
- November 2 – Kasper Franck, German theologian (d. 1584)
- November 8 – Lettice Knollys, English noblewoman (d. 1634)
- December 3 – Alessandro Riario, Italian Catholic cardinal (d. 1585)
- December 29 – Catherine of Nassau-Dillenburg, daughter of William I (d. 1624)
- date unknown
  - Nicolas de Neufville, seigneur de Villeroy, 2nd Prime Minister of France (d. 1617)
  - Thomas Deloney, English novelist and balladeer (d. 1600)
  - Domenico Fontana, Italian architect (d. 1607)
  - Sonam Gyatso, 3rd Dalai Lama, first Dalai Lama (d. 1588)
  - François Pithou, French lawyer and author (d. 1621)
  - Hayyim ben Joseph Vital, Syrian Jewish rabbi and mystic (d. 1620)
  - Chen Lin, Ming Dynasty general (d. 1607)
- probable
  - Giovanni Maria Nanino, Italian composer (d. 1607)
  - Federico Zuccari, Italian painter (d. 1609)

== Deaths ==
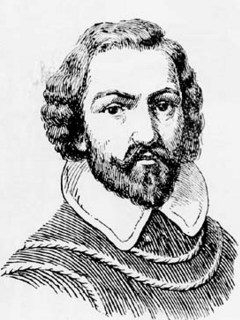
Juan Rodríguez Cabrillo

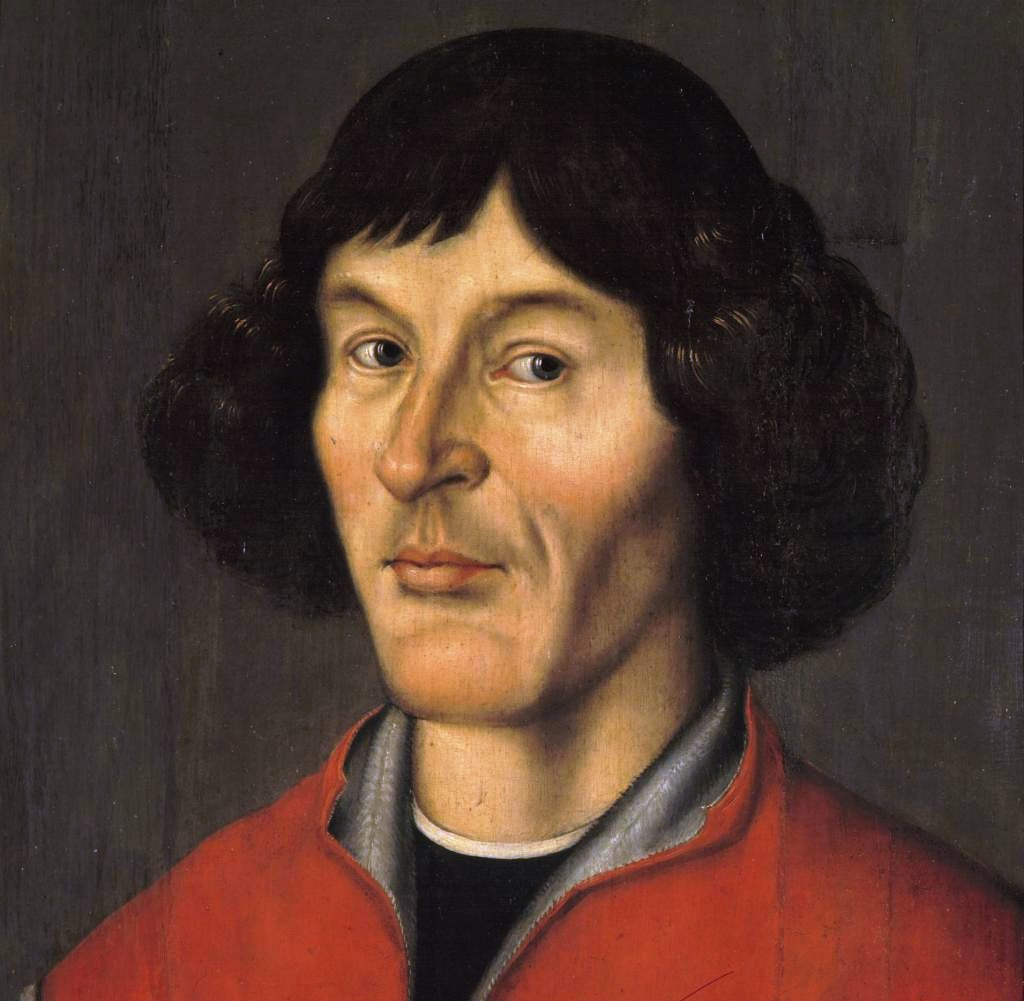
Nicolaus Copernicus

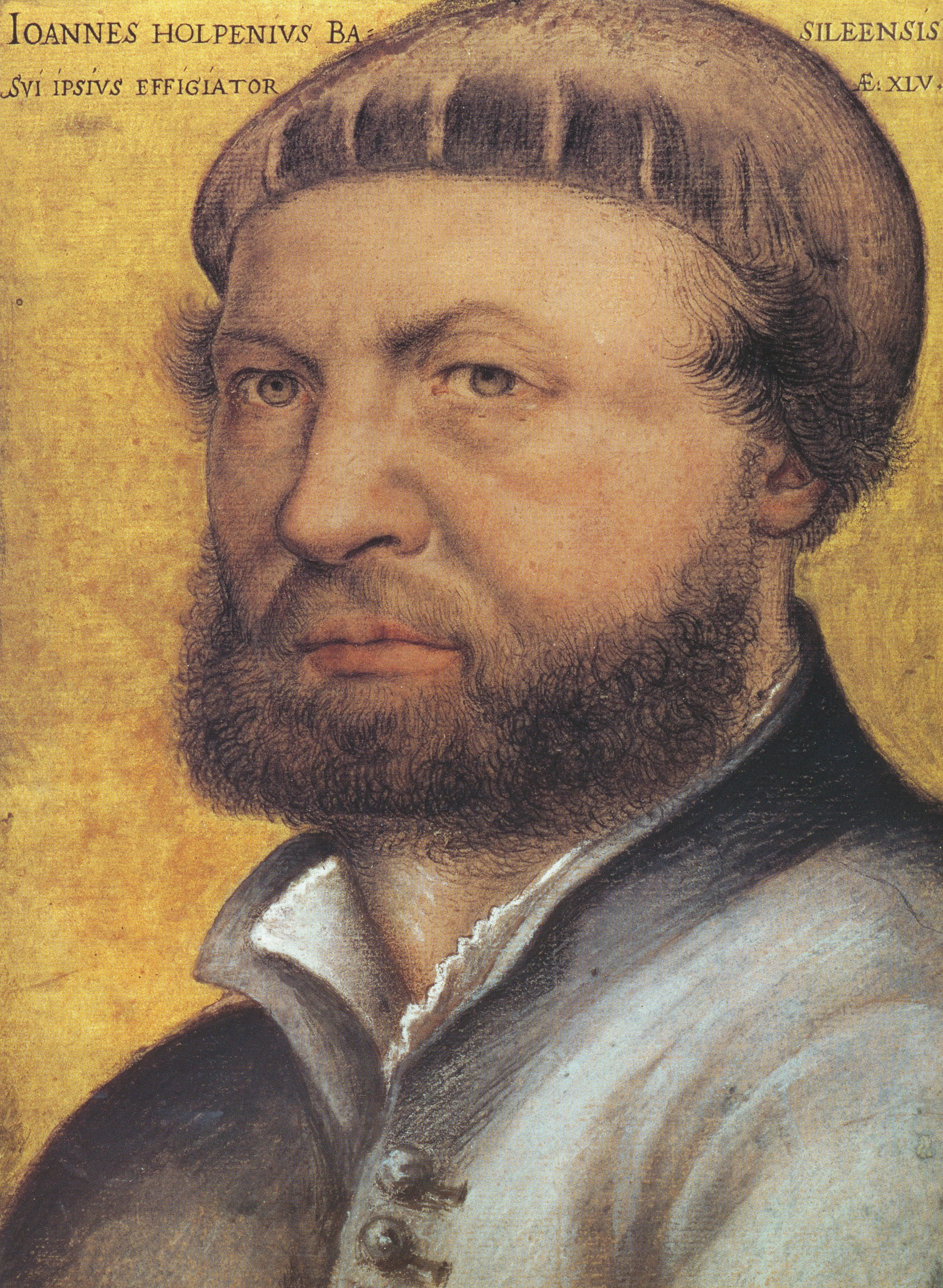
Hans Holbein the Younger

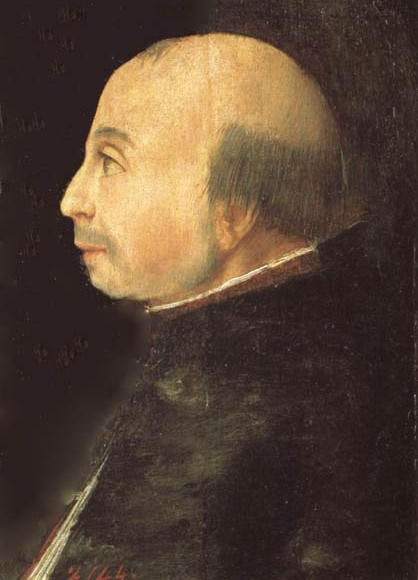
Gian Matteo Giberti

- January 2 – Francesco Canova da Milano, Italian composer (b. 1497)
- January 3 – Juan Rodríguez Cabrillo, Portuguese explorer (b. 1499)
- January 9 – Guillaume du Bellay, French diplomat and general (b. 1491)
- February 13 – Johann Eck, German Scholastic theologian (b. 1486)
- February 21 – Ahmad ibn Ibrahim al-Ghazi, Imam of Adal (in battle) (b. c. 1506)
- March 2 – John Neville, 3rd Baron Latimer, English politician (b. 1493)
- March 6 – Baccio D'Agnolo, Florentine woodcarver (b. 1460)
- April 23 – Susanna of Bavaria, German noble, House of Wittelsbach (b. 1502)
- May 24 – Nicolaus Copernicus, Polish mathematician and astronomer (b. 1473)
- June 27 – Agnolo Firenzuola, Italian poet (b. 1493)
- July 19 – Mary Boleyn, English courtier, mistress of Kings Francis I of France and Henry VIII of England (b. 1500)
- August 1 – Magnus I, Duke of Saxe-Lauenburg, German noble (b. 1470)
- August 29 – Maria of Jülich-Berg, German duchess, Spouse of John III, Duke of Cleves (b. 1491)
- September 2 – Sultan Quli Qutb Mulk, founder of the Qutb Shahi dynasty of Golconda (b. 1470)
- September 20 – Thomas Manners, 1st Earl of Rutland (b. 1492)
- September 23 – Johanna of Hachberg-Sausenberg, countess regnant of Neuchatel (b. 1485)
- November 29 – Hans Holbein the Younger, German artist, active in England
- December 27 – George, Margrave of Brandenburg-Ansbach (b. 1484)
- December 29 – Maria Salviati, Italian noble (b. 1499)
- December 30 – Gian Matteo Giberti, Italian Catholic bishop (b. 1495)
- date unknown
  - Polidoro da Caravaggio, Italian painter (b. 1492; murdered)
  - Madeleine Lartessuti, French shipper and banker (b. 1478)
  - Al-Mutawakkil III, last caliph of the Cairo-based Abbasid caliphate
  - Sehzade Mehmed, Ottoman prince (b. 1521)
- probable
  - Sebastian Franck, German freethinker (b. 1515)
  - Margaret Lee, English courtier, sister of poet Thomas Wyatt (b. 1506)
