= Odysseas =

Odysseas (Greek: Οδυσσέας) is a masculine given name. Notable people with the name include:

- Odysseas Adam (born 1997), Greek volleyball setter
- Odysseas Androutsos (c. 1790 – 1825), Greek soldier
- Odysseas Angelis (1912–1987), Greek artillery officer
- Odysseas Dimitriadis, Soviet classical music conductor
- Odysseas Elytis (1911–1996), Greek poet
- Odysseas Eskitzoglou (1932–2018), Greek sailor
- Odysseas Lymperakis (born 1998), Greek football left-back
- Odysseas Meladinis (born 1990), Greek swimmer
- Odysseas Michaelides, Cypriot politician
- Odysseas Phokas, Greek painter
- Odysseas Spyridis (born 2001), Cypriot football winger
- Odysseas Vlachodimos (born 1994), Greek football goalkeeper

== See also ==
- Odysseus, character in Greek mythology
