= February 18 =

February 18 this year in various calendars
- Wednesday, 18 February 2026
Akan	Nkyiwukuo
Armenian	3 Areg 1475
Aztec	Etzalcualiztli 19, 1 Mazātl
Babylonian	29 Tebetu, 2336 SE
Balinese pawukon	Menga, Kajeng, Jaya, Umanis, Urukung, Buda of Parangbakat, Guru, Dadi, Suka
Bengali	5 Falgun, BS 1432
Chinese	Yin Water Pig・Wall Mansion; Fire Horse Year, Month 1, Day 2 (Yushui, 15 days until Jingzhe)
Common Era	18 February 2026 CE
Coptic	11 Meshir, AM 1742
Egyptian	8 Epiphi, 2774 NE
Ethiopian	11 Yakātit, 2018 Amätä Məhrät
French Republican	Décade III, Décadi de Pluviôse de l'Année 234 de la République
Gregorian	18 February, AD 2026
Hebrew	1 Adar, AM 5786
Hindu	Śatabhiṣaj・Parigha; Solar: 6 Phālguna, 1947 SE; Lunisolar: Pratipada, Śukla pakṣa of Phālguna, 2082 VE; Siddhārthin・5126 KY・1,872,624
Icelandic	Miðvikudagur, 27 Þorri 2025
Islamic	1 Ramadan, AH 1447 (using tabular method)
ISO week date	2026-W08-3
Japanese	2 Mutsuki, Reiwa 8 (Risshun, 1 day until Usui)
Julian	5 February, AD 2026 (AM 7534)
Julian day	2461090
Korean	2 Horangidal, 4359 DE
Maya	13.0.13.6.7; 5 Kayab, 1 Manik
Roman	Nonis Februariis, MMDCCLXXIX AUC
Solar Hijri	29 Bahman, SH 1404
Tibetan	1 mchu, me pho rta 2153 or 1772 or 1000

<<	February					>>
Su	Mo	Tu	We	Th	Fr	Sa
1	2	3	4	5	6	7
8	9	10	11	12	13	14
15	16	17	18	19	20	21
22	23	24	25	26	27	28
2026

February 18 in recent years
2026 (Wednesday)
2025 (Tuesday)
2024 (Sunday)
2023 (Saturday)
2022 (Friday)
2021 (Thursday)
2020 (Tuesday)
2019 (Monday)
2018 (Sunday)
2017 (Saturday)

February 18 is the 49th day of the year in the Gregorian calendar; 316 days remain until the end of the year (317 in leap years).

== Events ==
=== Pre-1600 ===
- 3102 BC – Kali Yuga, the fourth and final yuga of Hinduism, starts with the death of Krishna.
- 1229 – The Sixth Crusade: Frederick II, Holy Roman Emperor, signs a ten-year truce with al-Kamil, regaining Jerusalem, Nazareth, and Bethlehem with neither military engagements nor support from the papacy.
- 1268 – The Battle of Wesenberg is fought between the Livonian Order and Dovmont of Pskov.
- 1332 – Amda Seyon I, Emperor of Ethiopia begins his campaigns in the southern Muslim provinces.

=== 1601–1900 ===
- 1637 – Eighty Years' War: Off the coast of Cornwall, England, a Spanish fleet intercepts an important Anglo-Dutch merchant convoy of 44 vessels escorted by six warships, destroying or capturing 20 of them.
- 1735 – The ballad opera called Flora, or Hob in the Well went down in history as the first opera of any kind to be produced in North America (Charleston, S.C.)
- 1781 – Fourth Anglo-Dutch War: Captain Thomas Shirley opens his expedition against Dutch colonial outposts on the Gold Coast of Africa (present-day Ghana).
- 1791 – Congress passes a law admitting the state of Vermont to the Union, effective 4 March, after that state had existed for 14 years as a de facto independent largely unrecognized state.
- 1797 – French Revolutionary Wars: Sir Ralph Abercromby and a fleet of 18 British warships invade Trinidad.
- 1814 – Napoleonic Wars: The Battle of Montereau.
- 1861 – In Montgomery, Alabama, Jefferson Davis is inaugurated as the provisional President of the Confederate States of America.
- 1861 – With Italian unification almost complete, Victor Emmanuel II of Piedmont, Savoy and Sardinia assumes the title of King of Italy.
- 1873 – Bulgarian revolutionary leader Vasil Levski is executed by hanging in Sofia by the Ottoman authorities.
- 1878 – John Tunstall is murdered by outlaw Jesse Evans, sparking the Lincoln County War in Lincoln County, New Mexico.
- 1885 – Adventures of Huckleberry Finn by Mark Twain is published in the United States.
- 1900 – Second Boer War: Imperial forces suffer their worst single-day loss of life on Bloody Sunday, the first day of the Battle of Paardeberg.

=== 1901–present ===
- 1906 – Édouard de Laveleye forms the Belgian Olympic Committee in Brussels.
- 1911 – The first official flight with airmail takes place from Allahabad, United Provinces, British India (now India), when Henri Pequet, a 23-year-old pilot, delivers 6,500 letters to Naini, about 10 kilometres (6.2 mi) away.
- 1915 – U-boat Campaign: The Imperial German Navy institutes unrestricted submarine warfare in the waters around Great Britain and Ireland.
- 1930 – While studying photographs taken in January, Clyde Tombaugh discovers Pluto.
- 1930 – Elm Farm Ollie becomes the first cow to fly in a fixed-wing aircraft and also the first cow to be milked in an aircraft.
- 1932 – The Empire of Japan creates the independent state of Manzhouguo (the obsolete Chinese name for Manchuria) free from the Republic of China and installed former Chinese Emperor Puyi as Chief Executive of the State.
- 1938 – Second Sino-Japanese War: During the Nanking Massacre, the Nanking Safety Zone International Committee is renamed "Nanking International Rescue Committee", and the safety zone in place for refugees falls apart.
- 1942 – World War II: The Imperial Japanese Army begins the systematic extermination of perceived hostile elements among the Chinese in Singapore.
- 1943 – World War II: The Nazis arrest the members of the White Rose movement.
- 1943 – World War II: Joseph Goebbels delivers his Sportpalast speech.
- 1945 – World War II: American and Brazilian troops kick off Operation Encore in Northern Italy, a successful limited action in the Northern Apennines that prepares for the western portion of the Allied Spring offensive.
- 1946 – Sailors of the Royal Indian Navy mutiny in Bombay harbour, from where the action spreads throughout the Provinces of British India, involving 78 ships, twenty shore establishments and 20,000 sailors
- 1947 – First Indochina War: The French gain complete control of Hanoi after forcing the Viet Minh to withdraw to the mountains.
- 1954 – The first Church of Scientology is established in Los Angeles.
- 1955 – Operation Teapot: Teapot test shot "Wasp" is successfully detonated at the Nevada Test Site with a yield of 1.2 kilotons. Wasp is the first of fourteen shots in the Teapot series.
- 1957 – Kenyan rebel leader Dedan Kimathi is executed by the British colonial government.
- 1957 – Walter James Bolton becomes the last person legally executed in New Zealand.
- 1965 – The Gambia becomes independent from the United Kingdom.
- 1970 – The Chicago Seven are found not guilty of conspiring to incite riots at the 1968 Democratic National Convention.
- 1972 – The California Supreme Court in the case of People v. Anderson, (6 Cal.3d 628) invalidates the state's death penalty and commutes the sentences of all death row inmates to life imprisonment.
- 1977 – The Xinjiang 61st Regiment Farm fire started during Chinese New Year when a firecracker ignited memorial wreaths of the late Mao Zedong, killing 694 personnel. It remains the deadliest fireworks accident in the world.
- 1977 – A thousand armed soldiers raid Kalakuta Republic, the commune of Nigerian singer Fela Kuti, leading to the death of Funmilayo Anikulapo Kuti.
- 1977 – The Space Shuttle Enterprise test vehicle is carried on its maiden "flight" on top of a Boeing 747.
- 1979 – Richard Petty wins a then-record sixth Daytona 500 after leaders Donnie Allison and Cale Yarborough crash on the final lap of the first NASCAR race televised live flag-to-flag.
- 1983 – Thirteen people die and one is seriously injured in the Wah Mee massacre in Seattle. It is said to be the largest robbery-motivated mass-murder in U.S. history.
- 1991 – The IRA explodes bombs in the early morning at Paddington station and Victoria station in London.
- 2001 – FBI agent Robert Hanssen is arrested for spying for the Soviet Union. He is ultimately convicted and sentenced to life imprisonment.
- 2001 – Sampit conflict: Inter-ethnic violence between Dayaks and Madurese breaks out in Sampit, Central Kalimantan, Indonesia, ultimately resulting in more than 500 deaths and 100,000 Madurese displaced from their homes.
- 2003 – 192 people die when an arsonist sets fire to a subway train in Daegu, South Korea.
- 2004 – Up to 295 people, 182 of which being rescue workers, die near Nishapur, Iran, when a runaway freight train carrying sulfur, petrol and fertilizer catches fire and explodes.
- 2010 – WikiLeaks publishes the first of hundreds of thousands of classified documents disclosed by the soldier now known as Chelsea Manning.
- 2013 – Armed robbers steal a haul of diamonds worth $50 million during a raid at Brussels Airport in Belgium.
- 2014 – Revolution of Dignity: At least 76 people are killed and hundreds are injured in clashes between riot police and demonstrators in Kyiv, Ukraine.
- 2018 – Iran Aseman Airlines Flight 3704 crashes in the Dena sub-range in the Zagros Mountains of Iran, Resulting in 66 Deaths
- 2021 – Perseverance, a Mars rover designed to explore Jezero crater on Mars, as part of NASA's Mars 2020 mission, lands successfully.

== Births ==
=== Pre-1600 ===
- 1201 – Nasir al-Din al-Tusi, Persian scientist and writer (died 1274)
- 1372 – Ibn Hajar al-Asqalani, Egyptian jurist and scholar (died 1448)
- 1486 – Chaitanya Mahaprabhu, Indian monk and saint (died 1534)
- 1516 – Mary I, Queen of England (died 1558)
- 1530 – Uesugi Kenshin, Japanese daimyō (died 1578)
- 1543 – Charles III, Duke of Lorraine (died 1608)
- 1547 – Bahāʾ al-dīn al-ʿĀmilī, founder of Isfahan School of Islamic Philosophy (died 1621)
- 1559 – Isaac Casaubon, Swiss philologist and scholar (died 1614)
- 1589 – Henry Vane the Elder, English politician (died 1655)
- 1589 – Maarten Gerritsz Vries, Dutch explorer (died 1646)

=== 1601–1900 ===
- 1602 – Per Brahe the Younger, Swedish soldier and politician, Governor-General of Finland (died 1680)
- 1602 – Michelangelo Cerquozzi, Italian painter (died 1660)
- 1609 – Edward Hyde, 1st Earl of Clarendon, English historian and politician, Chancellor of the Exchequer (died 1674)
- 1626 – Francesco Redi, Italian physician (died 1697)
- 1632 – Giovanni Battista Vitali, Italian violinist and composer (died 1692)
- 1642 – Marie Champmeslé, French actress (died 1698)
- 1658 – Charles-Irénée Castel de Saint-Pierre, French philosopher and author (died 1743)
- 1732 – Johann Christian Kittel, German organist and composer (died 1809)
- 1745 – Alessandro Volta, Italian physicist, invented the battery (died 1827)
- 1754 – Emanuel Granberg, Finnish church painter (died 1797)
- 1817 – Lewis Armistead, American general (died 1863)
- 1818 – John O'Shanassy, Irish-Australian politician, 2nd Premier of Victoria (died 1883)
- 1818 – Konstanty Schmidt-Ciążyński, Polish collector and art connoisseur who donated a large collection to the National Museum in Kraków (died 1889)
- 1836 – Ramakrishna Paramahamsa, Indian mystic and yogi (died 1886)
- 1838 – Ernst Mach, Austrian physicist and philosopher (died 1916)
- 1848 – Louis Comfort Tiffany, American stained glass artist (died 1933)
- 1849 – Alexander Kielland, Norwegian author, playwright, and politician (died 1906)
- 1850 – George Henschel, German-English singer-songwriter, pianist, and conductor (died 1934)
- 1855 – Jean Jules Jusserand, French historian, author, and diplomat, French Ambassador to the United States (died 1932)
- 1860 – Anders Zorn, Swedish artist (died 1920)
- 1862 – Charles M. Schwab, American businessman, co-founded Bethlehem Steel (died 1939)
- 1867 – Hedwig Courths-Mahler, German writer (died 1950)
- 1871 – Harry Brearley, English inventor (died 1948)
- 1883 – Nikos Kazantzakis, Greek philosopher, author, and playwright (died 1957)
- 1885 – Henri Laurens, French sculptor and illustrator (died 1954)
- 1893 – Maksim Haretski, Belarusian prose writer, journalist and activist (died 1938)
- 1890 – Edward Arnold, American actor (died 1956)
- 1890 – Adolphe Menjou, American actor (died 1963)
- 1892 – Wendell Willkie, American captain, lawyer, and politician (died 1944)
- 1896 – Li Linsi, Chinese educator and diplomat (died 1970)
- 1898 – Luis Muñoz Marín, Puerto Rican poet and politician, 1st Governor of the Commonwealth of Puerto Rico (died 1980)
- 1899 – Arthur Bryant, English historian and journalist (died 1985)

=== 1901–present ===
- 1903 – Nikolai Podgorny, Ukrainian engineer and politician (died 1983)
- 1906 – Hans Asperger, Austrian pediatrician and academic (died 1980)
- 1909 – Wallace Stegner, American novelist, short story writer, and essayist (died 1993)
- 1914 – Pee Wee King, American singer-songwriter and fiddler (died 2000)
- 1915 – Phyllis Calvert, English actress (died 2002)
- 1915 – Joe Gordon, American baseball player and manager (died 1978)
- 1919 – Jack Palance, American boxer and actor (died 2006)
- 1920 – Rolande Falcinelli, French organist, pianist, composer, and pedagogue (died 2006)
- 1921 – Mary Amdur, American toxicologist and public health researcher (died 1998)
- 1921 – Oscar Feltsman, Ukrainian-Russian pianist and composer (died 2013)
- 1922 – Eric Gairy, Grenadan politician, 1st Prime Minister of Grenada (died 1997)
- 1922 – Helen Gurley Brown, American journalist and author (died 2012)
- 1922 – Connie Wisniewski, American baseball player (died 1995)
- 1925 – George Kennedy, American actor (died 2016)
- 1926 – Wallace Berman, American painter and illustrator (died 1976)
- 1927 – Fazal Mahmood, Pakistani cricketer (died 2005)
- 1929 – Len Deighton, English historian and author (died 2026)
- 1929 – André Mathieu, Canadian pianist and composer (died 1968)
- 1931 – Johnny Hart, American cartoonist, co-created The Wizard of Id (died 2007)
- 1931 – Toni Morrison, American novelist and editor, Nobel Prize laureate (died 2019).
- 1932 – Miloš Forman, Czech-American actor, director, and screenwriter (died 2018)
- 1933 – Yoko Ono, Japanese-American multimedia artist and musician
- 1933 – Bobby Robson, English footballer and manager (died 2009)
- 1933 – Mary Ure, Scottish-English actress (died 1975)
- 1934 – Audre Lorde, American writer and activist (died 1992)
- 1936 – Jean M. Auel, American author
- 1939 – Claude Ake, Nigerian political scientist and academic (died 1996)
- 1940 – Fabrizio De André, Italian singer-songwriter and guitarist (died 1999)
- 1941 – Irma Thomas, American singer-songwriter
- 1944 – Elizabeth Nunez, American novelist (died 2024)
- 1946 – Michael Buerk, English journalist
- 1946 – Jess Walton, American actress
- 1947 – Dennis DeYoung, American musician, singer, and songwriter
- 1947 – Eliot Engel, American politician (died 2026)
- 1950 – Nana Amba Eyiaba I, Ghanaian queen mother and advocate
- 1950 – John Hughes, American director, producer, and screenwriter (died 2009)
- 1950 – Cybill Shepherd, American actress
- 1951 – Queen Komal of Nepal
- 1951 – Isabel Preysler, Filipino-Spanish journalist
- 1952 – Randy Crawford, American jazz and R&B singer
- 1952 – Maurice Lucas, American basketball player (died 2010)
- 1952 – Juice Newton, American singer-songwriter and guitarist
- 1954 – John Travolta, American actor, singer and producer
- 1955 – Lisa See, American writer and novelist
- 1957 – Marita Koch, German sprinter
- 1957 – Vanna White, American television personality
- 1959 – Jayne Atkinson, English-American actress
- 1960 – Andy Moog, Canadian ice hockey player
- 1960 – Greta Scacchi, Italian-Australian actress
- 1961 – Douglas Rushkoff, American media and cultural theorist, author, and documentarian
- 1964 – Matt Dillon, American actor
- 1965 – Dr. Dre, American rapper, record producer, and entrepreneur
- 1966 – Phillip DeFreitas, Dominican-English cricketer
- 1966 – Ryan Wesley Routh, American attempted assassin of Donald Trump
- 1967 – Roberto Baggio, Italian footballer
- 1967 – Colin Jackson, Welsh sprinter and hurdler
- 1968 – Molly Ringwald, American actress
- 1968 – Tommy Tallarico, American video game music composer
- 1969 – Alexander Mogilny, Russian ice hockey player
- 1971 – Thomas Bjørn, Danish golfer
- 1974 – Carrie Ann Baade, American painter and academic
- 1974 – Radek Černý, Czech footballer
- 1974 – Julia Butterfly Hill, American environmentalist and author
- 1974 – Jillian Michaels, American personal trainer and television personality
- 1975 – Gary Neville, English footballer
- 1977 – Ike Barinholtz, American actor and comedian
- 1977 – Kristoffer Polaha, American actor
- 1980 – Nik Antropov, Kazakhstani-Canadian ice hockey player
- 1980 – Regina Spektor, Russian-American musician and songwriter
- 1981 – Andrei Kirilenko, Russian-American basketball player
- 1981 – Alex Ríos, American baseball player
- 1982 – Christian Tiffert, German footballer
- 1983 – Kara Braxton, American basketball player (died 2026)
- 1983 – Jermaine Jenas, English footballer
- 1983 – Jason Maxiell, American basketball player
- 1984 – Carlos Kameni, Cameroonian footballer
- 1986 – Kyle Weaver, American basketball player
- 1988 – Roman Neustädter, German-Russian footballer
- 1988 – Sarah Sutherland, American actress
- 1988 – Maiara Walsh, American-Brazilian actress
- 1989 – Sonja Vasić, Serbian basketball player
- 1990 – Monica Aksamit, American saber fencer
- 1990 – Didi Gregorius, Dutch baseball player
- 1990 – Cody Hodgson, Canadian ice hockey player
- 1990 – Bryan Oviedo, Costa Rican footballer
- 1991 – Sebastian Neumann, German footballer
- 1992 – Le'Veon Bell, American football player
- 1992 – Martin Marinčin, Slovak ice hockey player
- 1992 – Logan Miller, American actor
- 1993 – Kentavious Caldwell-Pope, American basketball player
- 1994 – J-Hope, South Korean rapper, singer-songwriter, dancer, and record producer
- 1994 – Paul Zipser, German basketball player
- 1995 – Nathan Aké, Dutch footballer
- 1996 – Tyler Dorsey, American-Greek basketball player
- 1997 – DK, South Korean singer
- 1997 – Odysseas Adam, Greek volleyball player
- 1997 – Brandon Jones, American racing driver
- 1998 – Vernon, South Korean and American rapper, singer and songwriter
- 2000 – Zakaria Aboukhlal, Moroccan footballer
- 2000 – Giacomo Raspadori, Italian footballer
- 2001 – Tanguy Coulibaly, French footballer
- 2001 – Jaime Jaquez Jr., American basketball player
- 2002 – Manu Bhaker, Indian sports shooter

== Deaths ==
=== Pre-1600 ===
- 675 – Colmán, bishop of Lindisfarne
- 814 – Angilbert, Frankish monk and diplomat (born 760)
- 901 – Thābit ibn Qurra, Arab astronomer and physician (born 826)
- 999 – Gregory V, pope of the Catholic Church (born 972)
- 1139 – Yaropolk II, Grand Prince of Kiev (born 1082)
- 1218 – Berthold V, duke of Zähringen (born 1160)
- 1225 – Hugh Bigod, 3rd Earl of Norfolk, Norman nobleman
- 1294 – Kublai Khan, Mongol emperor (born 1215)
- 1379 – Albert II, duke of Mecklenburg (born 1318)
- 1397 – Enguerrand VII, French nobleman (born 1340)
- 1455 – Fra Angelico, Italian priest and painter (born 1395)
- 1478 – George Plantagenet, 1st Duke of Clarence, English nobleman (born 1449; executed)
- 1502 – Hedwig Jagiellon, duchess of Bavaria (born 1457)
- 1535 – Heinrich Cornelius Agrippa, German magician, astrologer, and theologian (born 1486)
- 1546 – Martin Luther, German priest and theologian, leader of the Protestant Reformation (born 1483)
- 1564 – Michelangelo, Italian sculptor and painter (born 1475)

=== 1601–1900 ===
- 1654 – Jean-Louis Guez de Balzac, French author (born 1594)
- 1658 – John Villiers, Viscount Purbeck, English courtier (born c. 1591)
- 1683 – Nicolaes Pieterszoon Berchem, Dutch painter (born 1620)
- 1695 – William Phips, governor of Massachusetts (born 1650)
- 1712 – Louis, Dauphin of France, (born 1682)
- 1743 – Anna Maria Luisa de' Medici, Italian noble (born 1667)
- 1748 – Otto Ferdinand von Abensberg und Traun, Austrian field marshal (born 1677)
- 1772 – Count Johann Hartwig Ernst von Bernstorff, Danish politician (born 1712)
- 1778 – Joseph Marie Terray, French economist and politician, Controller-General of Finances (born 1715)
- 1780 – Kristijonas Donelaitis, Lithuanian pastor and poet (born 1714)
- 1788 – John Whitehurst, English geologist and clockmaker (born 1713)
- 1803 – Johann Wilhelm Ludwig Gleim, German poet and educator (born 1719)
- 1851 – Carl Gustav Jacob Jacobi, German mathematician and academic (born 1804)
- 1873 – Vasil Levski, Bulgarian activist, founded the Internal Revolutionary Organization (born 1837)
- 1880 – Nikolay Zinin, Russian organic chemist (born 1812)
- 1893 – Serranus Clinton Hastings, American lawyer and politician, 1st Chief Justice of California (born 1814)

=== 1901–present ===
- 1902 – Charles Lewis Tiffany, American businessman, founded Tiffany & Co. (born 1812)
- 1910 – Lucy Stanton, American activist (born 1831)
- 1915 – Frank James, American soldier and criminal (born 1843)
- 1933 – James J. Corbett, American boxer and actor (born 1866)
- 1938 – David King Udall, American missionary and politician (born 1851)
- 1956 – Gustave Charpentier, French composer (born 1860)
- 1960 – Gertrude Vanderbilt, American stage actress (born c. 1885)
- 1966 – Grigory Nelyubov, Soviet pilot and military officer (born 1934)
- 1967 – J. Robert Oppenheimer, American physicist and academic (born 1904)
- 1969 – Dragiša Cvetković, Serbian lawyer and politician, 17th Prime Minister of Yugoslavia (born 1893)
- 1977 – Andy Devine, American actor (born 1905)
- 1981 – Jack Northrop, American engineer and businessman, founded the Northrop Corporation (born 1895)
- 1982 – Ngaio Marsh, New Zealand author (born 1895)
- 2001 – Balthus, Polish-Swiss painter and illustrator (born 1908)
- 2001 – Dale Earnhardt, American racer and seven-time NASCAR Cup Series champion (born 1951)
- 2014 – Mavis Gallant, Canadian-French author and playwright (born 1922)
- 2014 – Maria Franziska von Trapp, Austrian-American singer (born 1914)
- 2015 – Elchanan Heilprin, Slovak-born English rabbi (born 1920 or 1922)
- 2019 – Alessandro Mendini, Italian designer and architect (born 1931)
- 2020 – Flavio Bucci, Italian actor and voice actor (born 1947)
- 2025 – Gene Hackman, award-winning American actor (born 1930)
- 2025 – Gerald Ridsdale, Australian laicised Catholic priest and sex offender (born 1934)
- 2025 – Hurricane, American secret service canine (born 2009)
- 2026 – Borislav Paravac, Bosnian Serb politician, 8th Chairman of the Presidency of Bosnia and Herzegovina (born 1943)

== Holidays and observances ==
- Christian feast day:
  - Bernadette Soubirous (France)
  - Colmán of Lindisfarne
  - Flavian of Constantinople
  - Geltrude Comensoli
  - Simeon of Jerusalem (Western Christianity)
  - February 18 (Eastern Orthodox liturgics)
- Dialect Day (Amami Islands, Japan)
- Independence Day, celebrates the independence of the Gambia from the United Kingdom in 1965
- Kurdish Students Union Day (Iraqi Kurdistan)
- National Democracy Day, celebrates the 1951 overthrow of the Rana dynasty (Nepal)
