= 2019–20 West Ham United F.C. season =

English football team season

West Ham United
2019–20 season
- Co-chairmen: David Gold; David Sullivan
- Manager: Manuel Pellegrini (until 28 December); David Moyes (from 29 December)
- Stadium: London Stadium
- Premier League: 16th
- FA Cup: Fourth round (eliminated by West Bromwich Albion)
- EFL Cup: Third round (eliminated by Oxford United)
- Top goalscorer: League: Michail Antonio (10); All: Michail Antonio (10)
- Highest home attendance: 59,959 vs Liverpool (29 January 2020)
- Lowest home attendance: 59,870 vs Manchester City (10 August 2019)
- Average home league attendance: 59,896 (Note: Up to and including match played 29 February 2020. The five remaining home fixtures after this date were played behind closed doors due to the Coronavirus pandemic, and are not included in the overall figures.)
Home colours	Away colours	Third colours

The 2019–20 season was West Ham United's eighth consecutive campaign in the Premier League since being promoted in the 2011–12 season. It was West Ham's 24th Premier League campaign overall and their 62nd top flight appearance in their 125th year in existence.

In addition to the Premier League, West Ham United participated in the FA Cup entering in the third round before being eliminated by West Bromwich Albion in the fourth round. They also played in the EFL Cup, entering at the second round before being eliminated the third round by Oxford United of League One.

The season was suspended following a decision on 13 March 2020 by the Premier League to suspend the league after a number of players and other club staff became ill due to the coronavirus pandemic. The initial suspension was until 4 April, which was then extended. The FA then agreed to extend the season indefinitely, past the scheduled end date of 1 June. The season resumed on 19 June, with West Ham playing their first match since suspension the following day, losing 0–2 at home to Wolverhampton Wanderers. All matches from this date were played behind closed doors with no paying supporters and an attendance limited to 300 key people, although all West Ham's remaining fixtures were broadcast live on television or streaming platforms.

On 11 July, Michail Antonio scored all four goals in a 4–0 away victory over Norwich City. Antonio became the first West Ham player to score four times in a single Premier League match and the first in any league game since David Cross in 1981.

== Season squad ==
Squad No.	Name	Nationality	Position(s)	Date of birth (age)
Goalkeepers
1	Łukasz Fabiański	(Poland)	GK	18 April 1985 (aged 35)
13	Roberto	(Spain)	GK	10 February 1986 (aged 34)
25	David Martin	(England)	GK	22 January 1986 (aged 34)
35	Darren Randolph	(Republic of Ireland)	GK	12 May 1987 (aged 33)
Defenders
3	Aaron Cresswell	(England)	DF	15 December 1989 (aged 30)
21	Angelo Ogbonna	(Italy)	DF	23 May 1988 (aged 32)
23	Issa Diop	(France)	DF	9 January 1997 (aged 23)
24	Ryan Fredericks	(England)	DF	10 October 1992 (aged 27)
26	Arthur Masuaku	(Democratic Republic of the Congo)	DF	7 November 1993 (aged 26)
Midfielders
10	Manuel Lanzini	(Argentina)	MF	15 February 1993 (aged 27)
11	Robert Snodgrass	(Scotland)	MF	7 September 1987 (aged 32)
16	Mark Noble (C)	(England)	MF	8 May 1987 (aged 33)
18	Pablo Fornals	(Spain)	MF	22 February 1996 (aged 24)
19	Jack Wilshere	(England)	MF	1 January 1992 (aged 28)
28	Tomáš Souček	(Czech Republic)	MF	27 February 1995 (aged 25)
41	Declan Rice	(England)	MF	14 January 1999 (aged 21)
Forwards
7	Andriy Yarmolenko	(Ukraine)	FW	23 October 1989 (aged 30)
8	Felipe Anderson	(Brazil)	FW	15 April 1993 (aged 27)
17	Jarrod Bowen	(England)	FW	20 December 1996 (aged 23)
22	Sébastien Haller	(France)	FW	22 June 1994 (aged 26)
27	Albian Ajeti	(Switzerland)	FW	26 February 1997 (aged 23)
30	Michail Antonio	(England)	FW	28 March 1990 (aged 30)

Last updated: 26 July 2020.
Source: West Ham United F.C.

== Transfers ==
=== Transfers in ===
Date from	Position	Nationality	Name	From	Fee	Team	Ref.
1 July 2019	AM	(Spain)	Pablo Fornals	(Spain) Villarreal	£24,000,000	First team	
1 July 2019	GK	(England)	David Martin	(England) Millwall	Free transfer	First team	
1 July 2019	GK	(Spain)	Roberto	(Spain) Espanyol	Free transfer	First team	
1 July 2019	MF	(Slovakia)	Christian Veliky	(Czech Republic) Slavia Prague	Undisclosed	Academy	
17 July 2019	CF	(France)	Sébastien Haller	(Germany) Eintracht Frankfurt	£45,000,000	First team	
6 August 2019	CB	(Portugal)	Gonçalo Cardoso	(Portugal) Boavista	£2,750,000	First team	
8 August 2019	CF	(Switzerland)	Albian Ajeti	(Switzerland) Basel	£8,000,000	First team	
25 October 2019	FW	(Republic of Ireland)	Ademipo Odubeko	(England) Manchester United	Free transfer	Academy	
15 January 2020	GK	(Republic of Ireland)	Darren Randolph	(England) Middlesbrough	Undisclosed	First team	
31 January 2020	RW	(England)	Jarrod Bowen	(England) Hull City	£22,000,000	First team	

=== Loans in ===
Date from	Position	Nationality	Name	From	Date until	Team	Ref.
29 January 2020	DM	(Czech Republic)	Tomáš Souček	(Czech Republic) Slavia Prague	30 June 2020	First team	

=== Loans out ===
Date from	Position	Nationality	Name	To	Date until	Team	Ref.
1 July 2019	GK	(England)	Nathan Trott	(England) AFC Wimbledon	30 June 2020	Under-23s	
28 July 2019	CF	(England)	Jordan Hugill	(England) Queens Park Rangers	30 June 2020	First team	
7 August 2019	CM	(Republic of Ireland)	Josh Cullen	(England) Charlton Athletic	30 June 2020	First team	
8 August 2019	RW	(England)	Grady Diangana	(England) West Bromwich Albion	30 June 2020	First team	
30 August 2019	CF	(England)	Oladapo Afolayan	(England) Mansfield Town	1 January 2020	Under-23s	
2 September 2019	CB	(England)	Aji Alese	(England) Accrington Stanley	30 June 2020	Under-23s	
8 January 2020	LW	(England)	Nathan Holland	(England) Oxford United	30 June 2020	Under-23s	
10 January 2020	DM	(Republic of Ireland)	Conor Coventry	(England) Lincoln City	30 June 2020	Under-23s	
20 January 2020	GK	(Spain)	Roberto	(Spain) Alavés	30 June 2020	First team	
31 January 2020	RW	(England)	Dan Kemp	(England) Stevenage	30 June 2020	Under-23s	
14 February 2020	CB	(New Zealand)	Winston Reid	(United States) Sporting Kansas City	30 June 2020	First team	

=== Transfers out ===
Date from	Position	Nationality	Name	To	Fee	Team	Ref.
30 June 2019	CM	(Switzerland)	Edimilson Fernandes	(Germany) Mainz 05	£8,000,000	First team	
30 June 2019	CF	(Spain)	Lucas Pérez	(Spain) Alavés	£2,400,000	First team	
7 July 2019	CF	(Austria)	Marko Arnautović	(China) Shanghai SIPG	£23,000,000	First team	
16 July 2019	RB	(England)	Sam Byram	(England) Norwich City	£750,000	First team	
25 July 2019	DM	(Equatorial Guinea)	Pedro Obiang	(Italy) Sassuolo	Undisclosed	First team	
26 July 2019	AM	(England)	Marcus Browne	(England) Middlesbrough	Undisclosed	Under-23s	
2 August 2019	CB	(England)	Reece Oxford	(Germany) FC Augsburg	Undisclosed	First team	
12 August 2019	CF	(England)	Jahmal Hector-Ingram	(England) Derby County	Free transfer	Under-23s	
1 September 2019	CF	(Mexico)	Javier Hernández	(Spain) Sevilla	Undisclosed	First team	
14 January 2020	AM	(England)	Joe Powell	(England) Burton Albion	Undisclosed	Under-23s	
16 January 2020	CF	(Norway)	Martin Samuelsen	(England) Hull City	Undisclosed	Under-23s	
3 February 2020	LW	(Republic of Ireland)	Anthony Scully	(England) Lincoln City	Free transfer	Under-23s	

=== Released ===
Date from	Position	Nationality	Name	To	Team	Ref.
30 June 2019	GK	(Spain)	Adrián	(England) Liverpool	First team	
30 June 2019	CB	(England)	Mason Barrett	(England) Watford	Academy	
30 June 2019	CF	(England)	Andy Carroll	(England) Newcastle United	First team	
30 June 2019	DM	(Albania)	Kevin Dalipi	(England) Harlow Town	Academy	
30 June 2019	CM	(England)	Moses Makasi	(Netherlands) FC Eindhoven	Under-23s	
30 June 2019	CF	(Spain)	Toni Martínez	(Portugal) Famalicão	Under-23s	
30 June 2019	DM	(England)	Jay Mingi	(England) Charlton Athletic	Academy	
30 June 2019	AM	(France)	Samir Nasri	(Belgium) Anderlecht	First team	
30 June 2019	LB	(England)	Vashon Neufville	(Canada) Atlético Ottawa	Under-23s	
30 June 2019	CB	(England)	Josh Pask	(England) Coventry City	Under-23s	
30 June 2019	CF	(Cyprus)	Odysseas Spyridis	Free agent	Academy	
30 June 2019	CM	(Switzerland)	Noha Sylvestre	(Switzerland) Neuchâtel Xamax	Under-23s	
30 June 2020	RB	(Argentina)	Pablo Zabaleta	Free agent	First team	
30 June 2020	DM	(Colombia)	Carlos Sánchez	Free agent	First team	
30 June 2020	RB	(England)	Jeremy Ngakia	(England) Watford	First team	

== Pre-season ==
West Ham United confirmed on 26 March that they would be taking part in the 2019 Premier League Asia Trophy in China, alongside Newcastle United, Wolverhampton Wanderers and Premier League champions Manchester City. This will be West Ham's second appearance in the bi-annual competition, after finishing third in the 2009 edition. It was later announced on 13 May that West Ham would face Manchester City in the semi-finals, at the same time that ticket details were revealed.

11 July 2019 Friendly	SCR Altach	2–3	West Ham United	Altach, Austria
17:30	Fischer 31'; Lienhart 48'	Report	Sánchez 6'; Antonio 25'; Diop 58'	Stadium: Cashpoint Arena; Attendance: 2,981

17 July 2019 PL Asia Trophy	Manchester City	4–1	West Ham United	Nanjing, China
20:30 CST	D. Silva 33'; Nmecha 36' (pen.); Sterling 60', 72'	Report	Noble 26' (pen.)	Stadium: Nanjing Olympic Sports Centre; Referee: Craig Pawson (England)

20 July 2019 PL Asia Trophy	Newcastle United	1–0	West Ham United	Shanghai, China
18:00 CST	Muto 34'	Report		Stadium: Hongkou Stadium; Referee: Guan Xing (China)

27 July 2019 Friendly	Fulham	0–1	West Ham United	Fulham, London
15:00		Report	Lanzini 17'	Stadium: Craven Cottage

31 July 2019 Friendly	Hertha BSC	3–5	West Ham United	Ritzing, Austria
18:00	Köpke 4', 61'; Selke 21'	Report	Fornals 11'; Lanzini 29'; Haller 70'; Diangana 78'; Antonio 90'	Stadium: Sonnenseestadion

3 August 2019 Betway Cup	West Ham United	2–2 (2–4 p)	Athletic Bilbao	Stratford, London
15:00	Lanzini 22'; Wilshere 23'	Report	Haller 1' (o.g.); Williams 15'	Stadium: London Stadium; Attendance: 38,873; Referee: Michael Oliver (England)
	Penalties
	Hernández (penalty missed); Snodgrass (penalty scored); Yarmolenko (penalty scored); Diangana (penalty missed)		(penalty scored) Aduriz; (penalty scored) Beñat; (penalty missed) Ibai; (penalty scored) Sancet; (penalty scored) Berchiche

== Competitions ==
=== Premier League ===
==== League table ====
Pos	Team	Pld	W	D	L	GF	GA	GD	Pts	Qualification or relegation
14	Crystal Palace	38	11	10	17	31	50	−19	43	
15	Brighton & Hove Albion	38	9	14	15	39	54	−15	41	
16	West Ham United	38	10	9	19	49	62	−13	39	
17	Aston Villa	38	9	8	21	41	67	−26	35	
18	Bournemouth (R)	38	9	7	22	40	65	−25	34	Relegation to EFL Championship

Source: Premier League
Rules for classification: 1) Points; 2) Goal difference; 3) Goals scored; 4) If the champions, relegated teams or qualified teams for UEFA competitions cannot be determined by rules 1 to 3, rules 4.1 to 4.3 are applied – 4.1) Points gained in head to head record between such teams; 4.2) Away goals scored in head to head record between such teams; 4.3) Play-offs
(R) Relegated

==== Results summary ====
Overall								Home						Away					
Pld	W	D	L	GF	GA	GD	Pts	W	D	L	GF	GA	GD	W	D	L	GF	GA	GD
38	10	9	19	49	62	−13	39	6	4	9	30	33	−3	4	5	10	19	29	−10

Last updated: 26 July 2020.
Source: Premier League

==== Results by matchday ====
Round	1	2	3	4	5	6	7	8	9	10	11	12	13	14	15	16	17	18	19	20	21	22	23	24	25	26	27	28	29	30	31	32	33	34	35	36	37	38
Ground	H	A	A	H	A	H	A	H	A	H	H	A	H	A	A	H	A	A	H	H	A	H	A	H	H	A	A	H	A	H	A	H	A	H	A	H	A	H
Result	L	D	W	W	D	W	D	L	L	D	L	L	L	W	L	L	W	L	L	W	L	D	L	L	D	L	L	W	L	L	L	W	D	L	W	W	D	D
Position	20	16	14	7	8	5	5	8	10	10	13	16	17	13	15	16	15	17	17	16	16	16	17	17	18	18	18	16	16	17	17	16	16	16	16	15	15	16

Updated to match(es) played on 26 July 2020. Source: Statto.com
A = Away; H = Home; W = Win; D = Draw; L = Loss

==== Matches ====
On 13 June 2019, the Premier League fixtures were announced.

10 August 2019 1	West Ham United	0–5	Manchester City	Stratford, London
12:30 BST	Balbuena (yellow card) 61'; Felipe Anderson (yellow card) 62'	Report	Gabriel Jesus 25'; Sterling 51', 75', 90+1', (yellow card) 90+3'; Agüero 86' (pen.); Walker (yellow card) 87'	Stadium: London Stadium; Attendance: 59,870; Referee: Mike Dean
Note: Live on BT Sport

17 August 2019 2	Brighton & Hove Albion	1–1	West Ham United	Falmer
15:00 BST	Trossard 65'	Report	Hernández 61'; Masuaku (yellow card) 76'; Rice (yellow card) 90+4'	Stadium: Falmer Stadium; Attendance: 30,459; Referee: Anthony Taylor

24 August 2019 3	Watford	1–3	West Ham United	Watford
15:00 BST	Gray 17'; Holebas (yellow card) 63'	Report	Noble 3' (pen.); Haller 64', 73'; Ogbonna (yellow card) 76'	Stadium: Vicarage Road; Attendance: 20,035; Referee: Chris Kavanagh

31 August 2019 4	West Ham United	2–0	Norwich City	Stratford, London
15:00 BST	Haller 24'; Yarmolenko 56'; Fredericks (yellow card) 60'; Snodgrass (yellow card) 74'	Report	Aarons (yellow card) 62'	Stadium: London Stadium; Attendance: 59,950; Referee: Paul Tierney

16 September 2019 5	Aston Villa	0–0	West Ham United	Aston, Birmingham
20:00 BST	Grealish (yellow card) 28'; Mings (yellow card) 77'	Report	Masuaku (yellow card) 23' (yellow-red card) 67'; Noble (yellow card) 29'	Stadium: Villa Park; Attendance: 42,010; Referee: Mike Dean
Note: Live on Sky Sports

22 September 2019 6	West Ham United	2–0	Manchester United	Stratford, London
14:00 BST	Ogbonna (yellow card) 14'; Yarmolenko 44'; Noble (yellow card) 74'; Cresswell 84'	Report	Mata (yellow card) 48'; Young (yellow card) 83'	Stadium: London Stadium; Attendance: 59,936; Referee: Anthony Taylor
Note: Live on Sky Sports

28 September 2019 7	Bournemouth	2–2	West Ham United	Bournemouth
15:00 BST	King 17'; Rico (yellow card) 32'; C. Wilson 46'; Cook (yellow card) 88'; Lerma (yellow card) 90'	Report	Yarmolenko 10'; Cresswell 74'; Diop (yellow card) 79'	Stadium: Dean Court; Attendance: 10,729; Referee: Stuart Attwell

5 October 2019 8	West Ham United	1–2	Crystal Palace	Stratford, London
17:30 BST	Yarmolenko (yellow card) 44'; Haller 54', (yellow card) 61'; Fredericks (yellow card) 86'	Report	Ward (yellow card) 51'; Van Aanholt 63'; Ayew 87'; Benteke (yellow card) 90+6'	Stadium: London Stadium; Attendance: 59,912; Referee: Michael Oliver
Note: Live on Sky Sports

19 October 2019 9	Everton	2–0	West Ham United	Walton, Liverpool
12:30 BST	Bernard 17'; Davies (yellow card) 45+3'; Gomes (yellow card) 90+1'; Sigurðsson 90+2'	Report	Rice (yellow card) 70'; Diop (yellow card) 79'	Stadium: Goodison Park; Attendance: 39,263; Referee: Paul Tierney
Note: Live on BT Sport

26 October 2019 10	West Ham United	1–1	Sheffield United	Stratford, London
15:00 BST	Diop (yellow card) 28'; Snodgrass 44'; Balbuena (yellow card) 62'	Report	Baldock (yellow card) 59'; Mousset 69'; Stevens (yellow card) 90+2'	Stadium: London Stadium; Attendance: 59,878; Referee: David Coote

2 November 2019 11	West Ham United	2–3	Newcastle United	Stratford, London
15:00 GMT	Diop (yellow card) 14'; Cresswell (yellow card) 49'; Balbuena 73'; Snodgrass 90'	Report	Clark 16'; Fernández 22', (yellow card) 90+4'; Shelvey 51'	Stadium: London Stadium; Attendance: 59,907; Referee: Stuart Attwell

9 November 2019 12	Burnley	3–0	West Ham United	Burnley
15:00 GMT	Barnes 11'; Wood 44'; Mee (yellow card) 45+3'; Roberto 54' (o.g.); Westwood (yellow card) 88'	Report	Fredericks (yellow card) 69'	Stadium: Turf Moor; Attendance: 20,255; Referee: Kevin Friend

23 November 2019 13	West Ham United	2–3	Tottenham Hotspur	Stratford, London
12:30 GMT	Diop (yellow card) 11'; Fredericks (yellow card) 39'; Antonio 73'; Snodgrass (yellow card) 87'; Ogbonna 90+6'	Report	Son 36'; Lucas Moura 43'; Kane 49', (yellow card) 87'; Davies (yellow card) 70'	Stadium: London Stadium; Attendance: 59,930; Referee: Michael Oliver
Note: Live on BT Sport

30 November 2019 14	Chelsea	0–1	West Ham United	Fulham, London
15:00 GMT		Report	Cresswell 48', (yellow card) 90+5'; Fornals (yellow card) 65'; Yarmolenko (yellow card) 88'	Stadium: Stadium Bridge; Attendance: 40,595; Referee: Jonathan Moss

4 December 2019 15	Wolverhampton Wanderers	2–0	West Ham United	Wolverhampton
19:30 GMT	Dendoncker 23'; Jota (yellow card) 30'; Cutrone 86'	Report	Rice (yellow card) 67'; Cresswell (yellow card) 79'	Stadium: Molineux Stadium; Attendance: 31,217; Referee: Andre Marriner
Note: Live on Amazon Prime

9 December 2019 16	West Ham United	1–3	Arsenal	Stratford, London
20:00 GMT	Snodgrass (yellow card) 24'; Ogbonna 38'; Cresswell (yellow card) 49'	Report	Martinelli 60'; Pépé 66'; Aubameyang 69'	Stadium: London Stadium; Attendance: 59,936; Referee: Mike Dean
Note: Live on Sky Sports

14 December 2019 17	Southampton	0–1	West Ham United	Southampton
17:30 GMT	Højbjerg (yellow card) 37'	Report	Haller 37'; Snodgrass (yellow card) 45+2'; Fredericks (yellow card) 56'; Martin (yellow card) 90+4'	Stadium: St. Mary's Stadium; Attendance: 27,701; Referee: Martin Atkinson
Note: Live on Sky Sports

26 December 2019 18	Crystal Palace	2–1	West Ham United	Selhurst, London
15:00 GMT	Kouyate 68'; Ayew 90'	Report	Snodgrass 57'; Zabaleta (yellow card) 89'; Cresswell (yellow card) 90+3'	Stadium: Selhurst Park; Attendance: 25,462; Referee: Andre Marriner
Note: Live on Amazon Prime

28 December 2019 19	West Ham United	1–2	Leicester City	Stratford, London
17:30 GMT	Fabiański (yellow card) 10'; Fornals 45'; Masuaku (yellow card) 49'; Diop (yellow card) 56'; Rice (yellow card) 77'	Report	Gray (penalty missed) 12', 56'; Iheanacho 40'; Choudhury (yellow card) 90'	Stadium: London Stadium; Attendance: 59,919; Referee: David Coote

1 January 2020 20	West Ham United	4–0	Bournemouth	Stratford, London
17:30 GMT	Noble 17', 35' (pen.); Haller 26'; Felipe Anderson 66'; Cresswell (yellow card) 76'	Report	Rico (yellow card) 23'; L. Cook (yellow card) 88'	Stadium: London Stadium; Attendance: 59,917; Referee: Graham Scott
Note: Live on BT Sport

10 January 2020 21	Sheffield United	1–0	West Ham United	Sheffield
20:00 GMT	McBurnie 53'; Bešić (yellow card) 86'	Report		Stadium: Brammall Lane; Attendance: 30,124; Referee: Michael Oliver
Note: Live on Sky Sports

18 January 2020 22	West Ham United	1–1	Everton	Stratford, London
15:00 GMT	Diop 40'; Zabaleta (yellow card) 90+3'	Report	Calvert-Lewin 44'	Stadium: London Stadium; Attendance: 59,915; Referee: Andre Marriner

22 January 2020 23	Leicester City	4–1	West Ham United	Leicester
19:30 GMT	Barnes 24'; Pereira 45+5'; Schmeichel (yellow card) 50'; Pérez 81' (pen.), 88'	Report	Noble 50' (pen.); Ogbonna (yellow card) 80'	Stadium: King Power Stadium; Attendance: 31,968; Referee: David Coote
Note: Live on BT Sport

29 January 2020 24	West Ham United	0–2	Liverpool	Stratford, London
19:45 GMT	Diop (yellow card) 34'; Noble (yellow card) 43'	Report	Salah 35' (pen.); Oxlade-Chamberlain 52'	Stadium: London Stadium; Attendance: 59,959; Referee: Jonathan Moss

1 February 2020 25	West Ham United	3–3	Brighton & Hove Albion	Stratford, London
15:00 GMT	Diop 30'; Snodgrass 45', 57'; Ogbonna (yellow card) 90'	Report	Ogbonna 47' (o.g.); Stephens (yellow card) 52'; Groß 75'; Murray 79'	Stadium: London Stadium; Attendance: 59,952; Referee: Michael Oliver

19 February 2020 26	Manchester City	2–0	West Ham United	Manchester
19:30 GMT	Rodri 30'; De Bruyne 62'	Report	Masuaku (yellow card) 45'	Stadium: Etihad Stadium; Attendance: 52,159; Referee: Kevin Friend
Note: Live on Sky Sports

24 February 2020 27	Liverpool	3–2	West Ham United	Liverpool
20:00 GMT	Wijnaldum 9'; Salah 68'; Mané 81'	Report	Diop 12', (yellow card) 66'; Rice (yellow card) 51'; Fornals 54'; Noble (yellow card) 80'	Stadium: Anfield; Attendance: 53,313; Referee: Jonathan Moss
Note: Live on Sky Sports

29 February 2020 28	West Ham United	3–1	Southampton	Stratford, London
15:00 GMT	Bowen 15'; Haller 40'; Antonio 54'; Cresswell (yellow card) 65'	Report	Obafemi 31'; Stephens (yellow card) 45+1'	Stadium: London Stadium; Attendance: 59,962; Referee: Anthony Taylor

7 March 2020 29	Arsenal	1–0	West Ham United	Holloway, London
15:00 GMT	Papastathopoulos (yellow card) 63'; Lacazette 78'	Report	Fornals (yellow card) 9'; Antonio (yellow card) 90+3'	Stadium: Emirates Stadium; Attendance: 60,335; Referee: Martin Atkinson

20 June 2020 30	West Ham United	0–2	Wolverhampton Wanderers	Stratford, London
17:30 BST	Antonio (yellow card) 62'	Report	Moutinho (yellow card) 57'; Jiménez 73'; Neto 84'	Stadium: London Stadium; Attendance: 0 Referee: Anthony Taylor
Note: Live on Sky Sports. The match was postponed on 13 March due to concerns over the coronavirus pandemic. It was rescheduled to 20 June.

23 June 2020 31	Tottenham Hotspur	2–0	West Ham United	Tottenham, London
20:15 BST	Kane (yellow card) 51', (goal) 82'; Souček 64' (o.g.); Davies (yellow card) 67'	Report	Fornals (yellow card) 15'; Noble (yellow card) 26'	Stadium: Tottenham Hotspur Stadium; Attendance: 0 Referee: Craig Pawson
Note: Live on Sky Sports. The match was postponed on 13 March due to concerns over the coronavirus pandemic. It was rescheduled to 23 June.

1 July 2020 32	West Ham United	3–2	Chelsea	Stratford, London
20:15 BST	Souček 45+2'; Antonio 51'; Lanzini (yellow card) 65'; Rice (yellow card) 70'; Yarmolenko 89'	Report	Willian 42' (pen.), 72', (yellow card) 82'	Stadium: London Stadium; Attendance: 0 Referee: Martin Atkinson
Note: Live on Sky Sports. The match was postponed on 19 March due to concerns over the coronavirus pandemic. It was rescheduled to 1 July.

5 July 2020 33	Newcastle United	2–2	West Ham United	Newcastle-upon-Tyne
14:00 BST	Almirón 17'; Gayle (yellow card) 37'; Shelvey 67'	Report	Antonio 4'; Souček 65'	Stadium: St. James' Park; Attendance: 0 Referee: Craig Pawson
Note: Live on Sky Sports. The match was postponed on 19 March due to concerns over the coronavirus pandemic. It was rescheduled to 5 July.

8 July 2020 34	West Ham United	0–1	Burnley	Stratford, London
18:00 BST	Fredericks (yellow card) 64'	Report	Rodriguez 38'; Tarkowski (yellow card) 58'	Stadium: London Stadium; Attendance: 0 Referee: Michael Oliver
Note: Live on BT Sport. The match was postponed on 19 March due to concerns over the coronavirus pandemic. It was rescheduled to 8 July.

11 July 2020 35	Norwich City	0–4	West Ham United	Norwich
12:30 BST	Stiepermann (yellow card) 33'	Report	Antonio 11', 45+1', 54', 74'	Stadium: Carrow Road; Attendance: 0 Referee: Kevin Friend
Note: Live on BT Sport. The match was postponed on 19 March due to concerns over the coronavirus pandemic. It was rescheduled to 11 July.

17 July 2020 36	West Ham United	3–1	Watford	Stratford, London
20:00 BST	Antonio 6'; Souček 10'; Rice 36'	Report	Cleverley (yellow card) 9'; Hughes (yellow card) 35'; Deeney 49'	Stadium: London Stadium; Attendance: 0 Referee: Martin Atkinson
Note: Live on Sky Sports. The match was postponed on 3 April due to concerns over the coronavirus pandemic. It was rescheduled to 17 July.

22 July 2020 37	Manchester United	1–1	West Ham United	Manchester
18:00 BST	Fosu-Mensah (yellow card) 44'; Greenwood 51'; Rashford (yellow card) 70'; Fernandes (yellow card) 81'	Report	Antonio 45+2' (pen.); Masuaku (yellow card) 82'	Stadium: Old Trafford; Attendance: 0 Referee: Paul Tierney
Note: Live on Sky Sports. The match was postponed on 3 April due to concerns over the coronavirus pandemic. It was rescheduled to 22 July.

26 July 2020 38	West Ham United	1–1	Aston Villa	Stratford, London
16:00 BST	Antonio (yellow card) 23'; Fredericks (yellow card) 51'; Yarmolenko 85'	Report	Samatta (yellow card) 41'; Grealish 84'	Stadium: London Stadium; Attendance: 0 Referee: Michael Oliver
Note: The match was postponed on 3 April due to concerns over the coronavirus pandemic. It was rescheduled to 26 July.

=== FA Cup ===
The third round draw was made live on BBC Two from Etihad Stadium, Micah Richards and Tony Adams conducted the draw. The fourth round draw was made by Alex Scott and David O'Leary on Monday, 6 January.

5 January 2020 Third round	Gillingham	0–2	West Ham United	Gillingham
18:16 GMT	Jones (yellow card) 65'	Report	Zabaleta 74', (yellow card) 79'; Fornals 90+4'	Stadium: Priestfield Stadium; Attendance: 10,913; Referee: Andrew Madley
Note: Live on BT Sport

25 January 2020 Fourth round	West Ham United	0–1	West Bromwich Albion	Stratford, London
15:00 GMT	Diop (yellow card) 49'	Report	Townsend 9'; Barry (yellow card) 39'; Ajayi (yellow card) 44' (yellow-red card) 72'	Stadium: London Stadium; Attendance: 58,911; Referee: Stuart Attwell

=== EFL Cup ===
The second round draw was made on 13 August 2019 following the conclusion of all but one first-round matches. The third round draw was confirmed on 28 August 2019, live on Sky Sports.

27 August 2019 Second round	Newport County	0–2	West Ham United	Newport
19:45 BST		Report	Wilshere 43'; Fornals 65'	Stadium: Rodney Parade; Attendance: 6,382; Referee: Stephen Martin
Note: Live on Sky Sports

25 September 2019 Third round	Oxford United	4–0	West Ham United	Oxford
19:45 BST	Moore 55', (yellow card) 66'; Taylor 71'; Fosu 84'; Baptiste 90+2'	Report	Snodgrass (yellow card) 68'	Stadium: Kassam Stadium; Attendance: 10,450; Referee: Robert Jones

== Statistics ==
=== Appearances and goals ===
No.	Pos	Nat	Player	Total		Premier League		FA Cup		League Cup	
No.	Pos	Nat	Player	Apps	Goals	Apps	Goals	Apps	Goals	Apps	Goals
Goalkeepers
1	GK	(Poland) POL	Łukasz Fabiański	26	0	25	0	1	0	0	0
25	GK	(England) ENG	David Martin	5	0	5	0	0	0	0	0
35	GK	(Republic of Ireland) IRL	Darren Randolph	3	0	2	0	1	0	0	0
Defenders
3	DF	(England) ENG	Aaron Cresswell	33	3	31	3	1	0	1	0
4	DF	(Paraguay) PAR	Fabián Balbuena	21	1	17	1	2	0	2	0
21	DF	(Italy) ITA	Angelo Ogbonna	33	2	31	2	2	0	0	0
23	DF	(France) FRA	Issa Diop	36	3	32	3	2	0	2	0
24	DF	(England) ENG	Ryan Fredericks	28	0	27	0	1	0	0	0
26	DF	(Democratic Republic of the Congo) COD	Arthur Masuaku	18	0	16	0	1	0	1	0
53	DF	(England) ENG	Ben Johnson	3	0	3	0	0	0	0	0
Midfielders
11	MF	(Scotland) SCO	Robert Snodgrass	27	5	24	5	1	0	2	0
16	MF	(England) ENG	Mark Noble	35	4	33	4	1	0	1	0
18	MF	(Spain) ESP	Pablo Fornals	40	4	36	2	2	1	2	1
19	MF	(England) ENG	Jack Wilshere	10	1	8	0	0	0	2	1
28	MF	(Czech Republic) CZE	Tomáš Souček	13	3	13	3	0	0	0	0
41	MF	(England) ENG	Declan Rice	40	1	38	1	2	0	0	0
Forwards
7	FW	(Ukraine) UKR	Andriy Yarmolenko	23	5	23	5	0	0	0	0
8	FW	(Brazil) BRA	Felipe Anderson	28	1	25	1	1	0	2	0
10	FW	(Argentina) ARG	Manuel Lanzini	26	0	24	0	2	0	0	0
17	FW	(England) ENG	Jarrod Bowen	13	1	13	1	0	0	0	0
22	FW	(France) FRA	Sébastien Haller	35	7	32	7	2	0	1	0
27	FW	(Switzerland) SUI	Albian Ajeti	12	0	9	0	1	0	2	0
30	FW	(England) ENG	Michail Antonio	26	10	24	10	1	0	1	0
Players who left the club permanently or on loan during the season
5	DF	(Argentina) ARG	Pablo Zabaleta	14	1	10	0	2	1	2	0
9	FW	(Mexico) MEX	Javier Hernández	2	1	2	1	0	0	0	0
13	GK	(Spain) ESP	Roberto	10	0	8	0	0	0	2	0
15	MF	(Colombia) COL	Carlos Sánchez	10	0	6	0	2	0	2	0
37	MF	(England) ENG	Nathan Holland	3	0	2	0	0	0	1	0
52	DF	(England) ENG	Jeremy Ngakia	5	0	5	0	0	0	0	0
54	MF	(Ireland) EIR	Conor Coventry	1	0	0	0	0	0	1	0

=== Goalscorers ===
Rank	Pos	No.	Nat	Name	Premier League	FA Cup	League Cup	Total
1	MF	30	(England)	Michail Antonio	10	0	0	10
2	FW	22	(France)	Sébastien Haller	7	0	0	7
3=	MF	7	(Ukraine)	Andriy Yarmolenko	5	0	0	5
3=	MF	11	(Scotland)	Robert Snodgrass	5	0	0	5
5=	MF	16	(England)	Mark Noble	4	0	0	4
5=	MF	18	(Spain)	Pablo Fornals	2	1	1	4
7=	DF	3	(England)	Aaron Cresswell	3	0	0	3
7=	DF	23	(France)	Issa Diop	3	0	0	3
7=	MF	28	(Czech Republic)	Tomáš Souček	3	0	0	3
10	DF	21	(Italy)	Angelo Ogbonna	2	0	0	2
11=	DF	4	(Paraguay)	Fabián Balbuena	1	0	0	1
11=	DF	5	(Argentina)	Pablo Zabaleta	0	1	0	1
11=	FW	8	(Brazil)	Felipe Anderson	1	0	0	1
11=	FW	9	(Mexico)	Javier Hernández	1	0	0	1
11=	FW	17	(England)	Jarrod Bowen	1	0	0	1
11=	MF	19	(England)	Jack Wilshere	0	0	1	1
11=	MF	41	(England)	Declan Rice	1	0	0	1
Totals					49	2	2	53
