= Bernardino de Mendoza (Captain General) =

Spanish noble

- Captain General of the Galleys of Spain
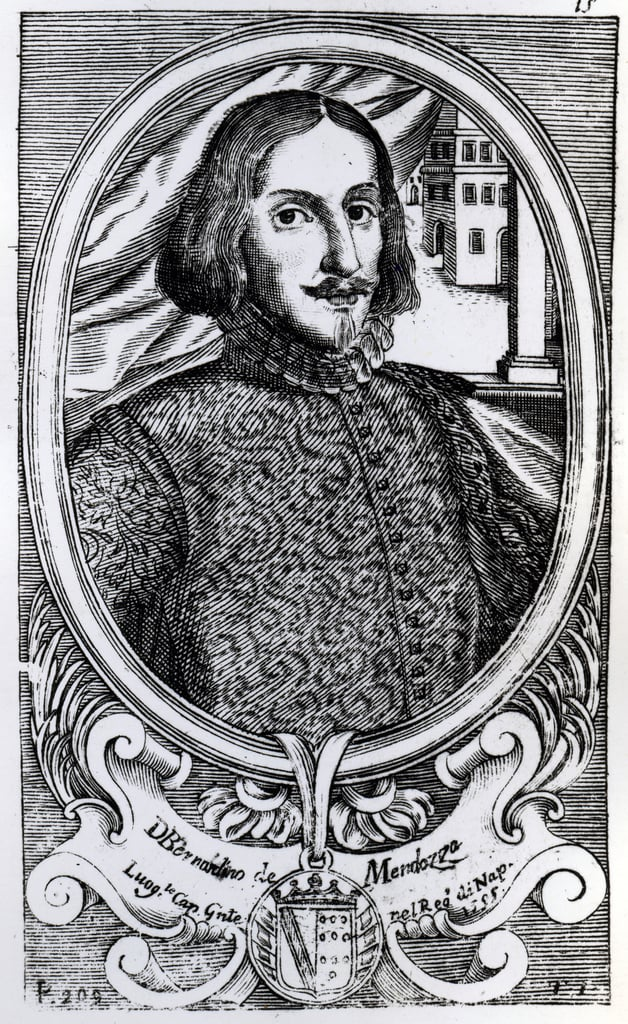
- Born: 1501; Granada
- Died: 1557 (aged 55–56); St. Quentin
- Spouse: Elvira Carrillo y Córdoba
- Father: Íñigo López de Mendoza y Quiñones, 1st Marquis of Mondéjar
- Mother: Francesca Pacheco
- Occupation: Captain General of the Galleys of Spain

Bernardino de Mendoza (Granada, 1501 – Saint-Quentin, 1557), was a Spanish noble from the House of Mendoza and Captain General of the Galleys of Spain. He was the third son of Íñigo López de Mendoza y Quiñones, 1st Marquis of Mondéjar and Francesca Pacheco. His siblings were Luis, Maria, Antonio and Diego Hurtado.

He was an accomplished admiral and shipbuilder of his age, associate to Andrea Doria and rival of Álvaro de Bazán the Elder. Among his works, he created the system of Spanish treasure fleets, based on fleets of well-armed ships, which would be upheld during over three centuries.

== Early days of naval career ==
Mendoza was destined for a career in the Spanish Navy. In his youth, he sailed with two galleys to fight the Barbary corsairs in the Mediterranean Sea, at his own expense. In October 1525, he participated in the failed attempt to reconquer Peñón de Vélez de la Gomera, led by his brother Luis Hurtado de Mendoza y Pacheco, 2nd Marquis of Mondéjar and Captain General of Granada.

== Captain General of the Galleys of Spain ==
In 1533, he became Captain General of the Galleys of Spain. In 1535 he led twelve galleys, some of them previously captured from the Turks, to take part in the Conquest of Tunis (1535). He remained in Tunis, to defend the fortress of La Goleta at the head of 1,000 Spanish troops. He returned to sea with six galleys, but was recalled to La Goleta to prevent the unpaid and mutinous Spanish garrison from selling the fortress to the Turks. He sailed them to Sicily with a promise of payment. When they were not paid there either, the troops caused problems in Sicily.

In 1540, Mendoza gained an important victory in the Battle of Alborán, crushing superior Turkish forces. He suffered multiple wounds, among them an arquebus shot to the head, and partially lost control of the use of his arms. One year later, he led 15 galleys in the failed Algiers expedition. In 1550, he won another important battle against the Turks, when he took Mahdiye.

== Foreign wars and his death ==
In 1555, he was temporarily Viceroy of Naples because Cardinal Pedro Pacheco de Villena attended the Papal conclave, May 1555. One year later, King Philip II of Spain made him State Councilor. Very uncomfortable at court, Mendoza soon left for Flanders to fight under Emmanuel Philibert, Duke of Savoy against the French.

After the Battle of St. Quentin (1557), he was charged with reinforcing the city's defences, but he died soon after from wounds received in the battle.

== Marriage and children ==
He married Elvira Carrillo y Córdoba and had at least five children, including:

- Juan Hurtado de Mendoza y Carrillo, also Captain General of the galleys and commander of La Goleta. Died in the naval disaster of La Herradura (1562).
- Catalina, married Luis Hurtado de Mendoza, 4th Marquis of Mondéjar.

== Sources ==
- Los Mendoza: el marino Bernardino de Mendoza (in Spanish)
