= Álvaro de Bazán the Elder =

Spanish naval commander, 1506-1558

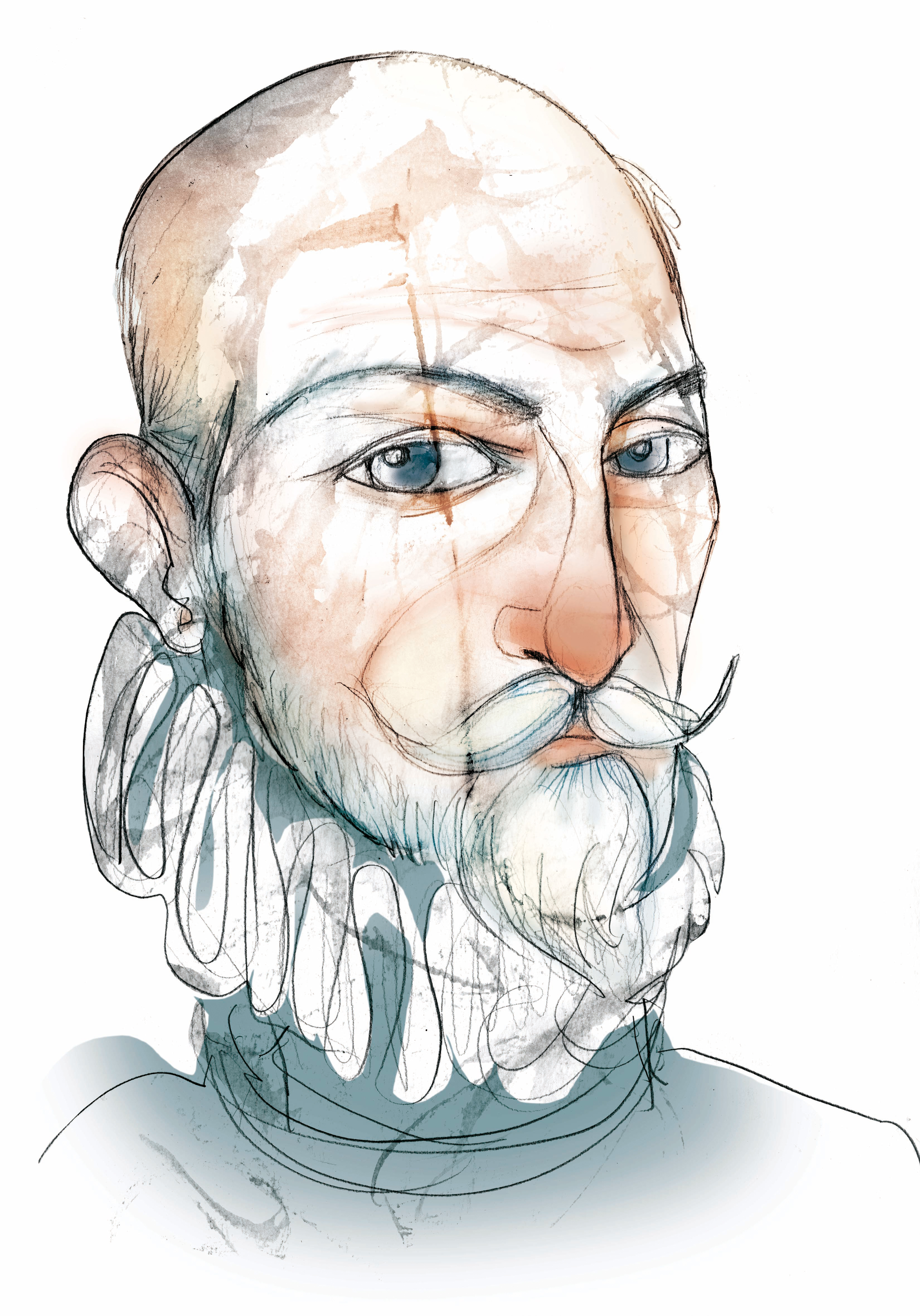
- Álvaro de Bazán el Viejo (MUNCYT, Eulogia Merle)
- Born: 1506
- Died: 1558 (aged 51–52)
- Military career
- Allegiance: Spain
- Branch: Navy
- Rank: General-Captain of the Galleys of Spain; General-Captain of the Ocean Sea
- Conflicts: Ottoman–Habsburg wars; Conquest of Tunis; Italian War of 1542–1546; Battle of Muros Bay

Álvaro de Bazán y Solís, called the Elder (1506 – 1558), was a Spanish admiral and shipbuilder, General-Captain of the Galleys of Spain for Charles V, Holy Roman Emperor.

He was a successful naval commander and ship designer, innovating in the design of galleons and galleasses. He worked extensively to expand and modernize the Spanish fleets to counter the dominant Ottoman Navy, as well as the new threats of foreign piracy and provateering in the Atlantic. Along with the Genoese Andrea Doria, he was the main shipbuilder of Charles V's reign.

== Biography ==
Bazán started his career in the royalist side of the revolt of the Comuneros, participating in the Siege of Fuenterrabía with distinguished services. After the revolt, already in 1526, he became General-Captain of Galleys of Spain after the death of his predecessor Juan de Velasco. Gaining renown as a shipbuilder, he moved engineers and workers to Barcelona and built 50 new galleys for Rodrigo de Portuondo to take to the imperial fleet, in which Charles V traveled to Rome to be formally crowned by Pope Clement VII.

=== Ottoman-Habsburg wars ===
In 1529, Ottoman corsair Hayreddin Barbarossa conquered the Peñón of Algiers, turning it into a base of Barbary privateering. Months later, Portuondo, now General-Captain of Granada, fell unexpectedly against Barbarossa's lieutenant Aydın Reis, due to which Bazán was promoted to his captaincy. In August 1532, with a fleet of ten galleys and 2,000 soldiers, Bazán captured the city of Honaine, another of Barbarossa's ports. Returning with much booty and 1,000 prisoners, he used them to increase the number of galleys under his command up to 15. Bazán's presence dissuaded Aydin and Sinan Reis from acting freely in Spanish waters, although their attacks on European coasts to feed the lucrative Barbary slave trade continued being endemic.

In May 1533, Ottoman Sultan Suleiman the Magnificent issued a 110-ship fleet under Lütfi Pasha to besiege Corone, which grand imperial admiral Andrea Doria had conquered the previous year while sacking the Ottoman Peloponnese. Bazán contributed to Doria's relief fleet with 12 galleys of his own making, although they eventually did not join the fleet, staying in Messina possibly to watch for the movements of the French fleet of Marseille. Doria still managed to lift the siege. The same year, Bazán captured Turkish privateer Jaban Arraez, who came recklessly against him with two galleys and six galiots.

Bazán also led the Spanish galleys during the conquest of Tunis in 1535, serving as Doria's lieutenant in the fleet. He explored the local defenses by staging a grand ruse, where he had his galley rush to the enemy port of La Goulette while pursued by the rest of the fleet, making it look like his ship had been seized by its rowing slaves. He then escaped La Goulette after firing his artillery point blank on the port. Bazán later headed the assault of La Goulette with the Spanish marine infantry, narrowly avoiding death by an arquebus shot which wounded him in the nose.

However, when Barbarossa fled Tunis, Bazán was passed over by Doria for the mission to chase the Turk, which was instead handed to his relatives Giannettino Doria and Adamo Centurione. They reached Hayreddin in Bonna, but upon finding him with a fleet in equal numbers to theirs, they turned tail without even blockading the harbor. When Doria arrived with reinforcements, Barbarossa had already fled to Algiers, which the fleet could not invade due to the autumn weather. Bazán was so disappointed with the lost chance that he vowed to quit from his job as soon as it would be possible, being also embittered by his usual clashes with the grueling Spanish bureaucracy.

=== Italian War of 1536-1538 ===
In 1536 Spain entered a new Italian War against France and the Ottoman Empire due to the death of Francesco I Sforza, which let the Duchy of Milan land in the hands of Philip, Prince of Asturias. Doria and Bazán captured port cities throughout the French Riviera, including Antibes, Toulon, Grasse and Castellane, stopping only at Marseille, too well defended. In October, Bazán was leading 25 galleys, ten of them belonging to the Sicilian fleet of Berenguel de Olmos, when he came near Collioure upon a Franco-Ottoman fleet of 28 galleys and galiots, commanded by Careor and the Algerian corsair Ali in route to pillage the Spanish coasts. Careor and Ali fled as soon as they sighted him, although Bazán could reach and capture their flagship.

The following year, not having grand orders to fulfill, and in spite of many pleas on Charles' part to stay, Bazán quit as he had planned and was replaced by Bernardino de Mendoza, although he continued building and managing ships. He was conceded a contract to hunt Ottoman corsairs with 15 private galleys. In 1539, Charles V sold him the villages of Viso del Marqués and Santa Cruz de Mudela, where his son would order the construction of a large palace that he would make the residence of its descendants. It currently houses the Spanish Navy's general archive.

In early 1540 he started building a quinquereme-type galley which he expected to sell to Charles V as a grand flagship, for which Bazán rekindled his relationship with Andrea Doria. However, despite Doria's suggestions, the emperor was not focusing his resources in expanding his armada that year. The ship was burnt during a Turkish raid on Gibraltar while Bazán and his son were absent, although the attackers were immediately intercepted and defeated by Mendoza in the Battle of Alborán. Despite this disturbance against his domains, Bazán was now more interested in the Atlantic theater, sensing that Spain would need to develop its naval power there in the future.

=== Atlantic fleet ===
Also in 1540, Bazán obtained a naval contract to guard the Atlantic coasts of Spain and the vital sea route to the Indies. He initiated the building of galleons and galleasses of his own design with multiple upgrades, which were highly praised. He explored particularly how to combine the different advantages of rowing ships and sailing ships, as well as how to build vessels of high tonnage and speed at the same time, without falling in the usual shortcomings of the age's biggest carracks, such as those built in France, England or Venice. His Atlantic galleasses, conceived as sailing ships only secondarily assisted by rows, differed substantially from the Mediterranean galleasses built by Venice, which were based primarily on rowing.

He formed his private fleet with vessels built by himself in Biscay, among which were the 800-ton galleass Santa María, the 1,200-ton Santa María Magdalena and the galleons San Pedro and San Pablo, of 600 and 700 tons respectively, along with several minor chalupas. The four main ships, which substantially outsized the 200–500-ton carracks and naus typically found in the Atlantic, also fielded around 100 guns each. They had a high success against foreign privateering and piracy.

=== Italian War of 1542–1546 ===
In 1543, with the outbreak of the Italian War of 1542–1546, Charles I found the chance to redress Bazán for his former conflicts and reward him for his recent work, appointing him Captain General of the Ocean, with bases in Gipuzkoa, Biscay and the Cuatro Villas. The northern ports were of utmost importance for Castile's warring effort, with Biscayan privateers having captured 25 French naus since the war's beginning. Being ordered to transport the tercio of Pedro de Guzmán to the Habsburg Netherlands, and to gather an armada to counter the French Atlantic fleet, Bazán readied 40 ships of 200–500 tons, sending off Guzmán in 15 of them in June and leaving other 25 to his own command.

Similar preparations were being made in northern France, where vessels from the Mediterranean and Atlantic coasts were being concentrated in order to face both Spain and England. In July, French admiral Jean de Clamorgan sailed off Bayonne with 30 ships to raid Biscayan trade. The French fleet passed Laredo, where Bazán was getting ready his own, and as soon as the Spanish admiral finished in pursue of Clamorgan. He found him in Fisterra, where Clamorgan was trying to get the surrender of the local lords after sacking around the coast of Galicia. In spite of Bazán's disadvantage in numbers, his ships compensated it by their superior size and shipbuilding. In the subsequent Battle of Muros Bay, Bazán attacked the French fleet and rammed their flagship with his own, after which all of the French ships barring one were captured.

By 1545, France had gathered an armada of over 250 ships in Le Havre to launch an invasion of England, although several of the ships were lost by mismanagement, among them the 600-ton flagship Philippe or Carraçon, burnt due a party on board. The invasion ended in failure after being repulsed by the English in the Battle of the Solent. By contrast, the Basque armadas organized by Bazán achieved high counts of captures against France, it being reported that in the following decade, the 300–350 privateering ships based off Guipuzkoa and Biscay took up to 1,400 enemy ships from Europe to Newfoundland, both civilian and warships.

=== Last services ===
In 1548 Bazán made a series of proposals to improve the system of Spanish treasure fleets. He suggested to replace the existent fleet by 20 galleasses of 200 tons built by him, middle steps between galleys and galleons (bastardas de galera y galeón), which would perform five voyages per year on convoys of four. He found no support, as there was skepticism towards the usage of galleasses to make the long travel to the Indies. The Council of the Indies and the Casa de Contratación also feared the contract would give Bazán an overwhelming monopoly on commercial navigation. He then presented a project improved by following on their criticism, featuring 12 galleasses of 400 tons, which he assured would sail as easily as 300-ton ships, but it was rejected. They also rejected a more conservative proposal on his part which replaced the galleasses by 12 galleons.

His fourth and last proposal, in October 1549, was a system of three galleasses and six galleons with frigate traits (afragatados) also designed by him, which would make three yearly voyages heading other cargo ships. This project was finally accepted and earned Bazán a 15-year contract, but the Casa de Contratación opposed and caused a lawsuit. Although the court eventually favored Bazán, the contract was ultimately not realized. Bazán was forced to relegate his galleasses to escort the treasure fleets, although soundly so, to the point they would be reputed to be among the finest ships of their age.

In 1554, Bazán was part of the fleet tasked with taking Prince Philip to England for his wedding to Mary I. Aside from his Santa María and Magdalena, he prepared a rich galleass to serve as the royal flagship, but Mary I had also send a royal carrack, and in order to affront neither the admiral nor the queen they decided to use a third ship, with Bazán accompanying Philip aboard.

From that year and until his death in 1558, Bazán the Elder defended the Spanish and American coasts against attacks, capturing routinely enemy ships. His son Álvaro de Bazán the Younger, who started his own career, served him as his lieutenant. Bazán's long desired renovation of the treasure fleets was finally undertaken in 1561 by Pedro Menéndez de Avilés, who built a successful escort fleet of 12 medium galleasses.

== Issue ==
Don Álvaro de Bazán came from an old Navarrese noble family. He was the father of Álvaro de Bazán, 1st Marquis of Santa Cruz, who surpassed him in fame and success. At the age of eight his son was appointed Military Governor and captain of the fortress and city of Gibraltar. His command however was via his father. It has been speculated that this unusual appointment was intended to show Charles V's confidence, but Bazán the Elder did not share that confidence and he suggested to no effect that Gibraltar's Line Wall Curtain be extended to the southern tip of the rock. Bazán the Elder was also father of Alonso de Bazán, Diego de Bazán and Juan de Bazán, the last being a captain who died during the conquest of the Peñón de Vélez de la Gomera.

== Bibliography ==
- Bordejé y Morencos, Fernando (1992). Tráfico de Indias y política oceánica. Editorial Mapfre. ISBN 9788471002136.
- Fernández Duro, Cesáreo (1895). Armada Española, desde la unión de los reinos de Castilla y Aragón, tomo I. Instituto de Historia Naval.
- Guilmartin, Francis John. Gunpowder and Galleys: Changing Technology and Mediterranean Warfare at Sea in the 16th Century Naval Institute Press; Revised edition (2004) ISBN 1-59114-347-0
- Hernández-Palacios, Martín (2023). Álvaro de Bazán: El mejor marino de Felipe II. Rialp. ISBN 9788432165191.
- Hoffman E, Paul. Spanish Crown and the Defense of the Caribbean 1535-1585: Precedent, Patrimonialism, and Royal Parsimony Louisiana State University Press (June 1980) ISBN 0-8071-0583-X
- Martínez, Enrique (2022). Las flotas de Indias: la revolución que cambió el mundo. La Esfera de los Libros. ISBN 978-84-1384-278-3.
- Martínez-Hidalgo, José María (1992). Enciclopedia general del mar. Garriga. ISBN 978-84-7079-090-4.
- Nicieza Forcelledo, Guillermo (2025). Almirantes del Imperio: los grandes comandantes de las Armadas españolas del siglo XVI. EDAF. ISBN 9788441444485.
- Perez-Mallaina E, Rahn Phillips Rahn, Carla. Spain's men of the sea: daily life on the Indies fleets in the sixteenth century The Johns Hopkins University Press (1998) ISBN 0-8018-5746-5
- Olesa-Muñido, Francisco Felipe (1968). La organización naval de los estados mediterráneos y en especial de España durante los siglos XVI y XVII. Tomo 2. Editorial Naval.
- Rodríguez González, Augustín (2017). Álvaro de Bazán: Capitán general del Mar Océano. EDAF. ISBN 9788441438033.
- Stampa Piñeiro, Leopoldo (2020). Los galeones de las especias: España y las Molucas. EDAF. ISBN 9788441440395.
- Trevor, Reginald. Davies The golden century of Spain, 1501-1621 Ams Pr Inc (1996) ISBN 0-404-20073-7
- Valdez-Bubnov, Iván (2012). Poder naval y modernización del Estado: política de construcción naval española (siglos XVI-XVIII). Bonilla Artigas. ISBN 9786077588696.
