= Ryan Fredericks =

English footballer (born 1992)

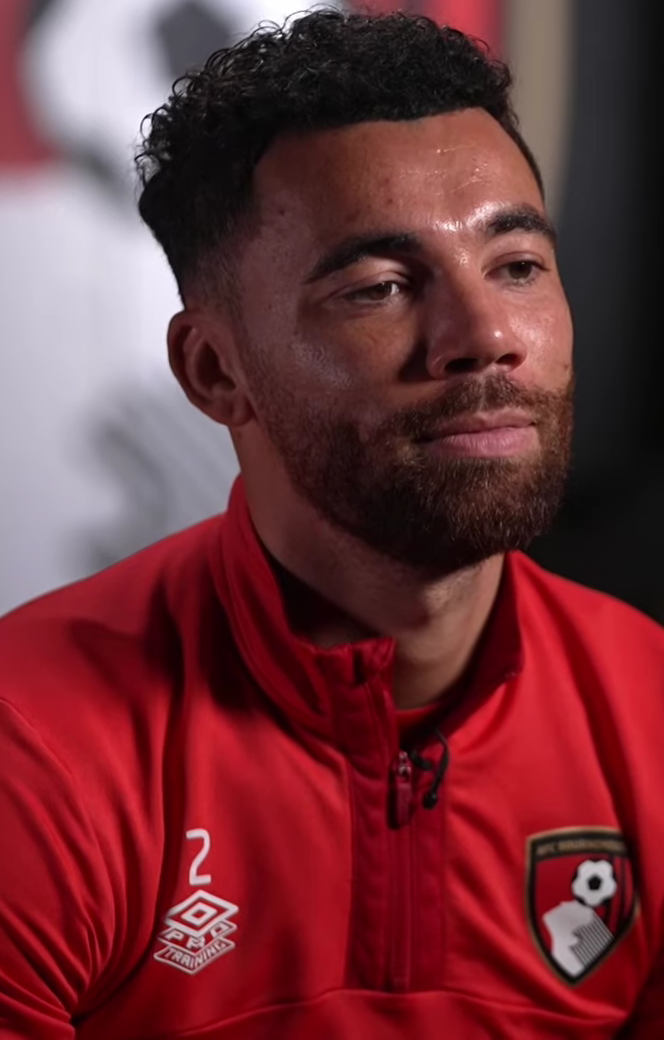
- Fredericks with AFC Bournemouth in 2022

Personal information
- Full name: Ryan Marlowe Fredericks
- Date of birth: 10 October 1992 (age 34)
- Place of birth: Hammersmith, England
- Height: 5 ft 11 in (1.81 m)
- Position: Right-back

Youth career
- –2010: Tottenham Hotspur

Senior career*
Years	Team	Apps	(Gls)
2010–2015	Tottenham Hotspur	0	(0)
2012	→ Brentford (loan)	4	(0)
2014	→ Millwall (loan)	14	(1)
2014–2015	→ Middlesbrough (loan)	17	(0)
2015	Bristol City	4	(0)
2015–2018	Fulham	106	(0)
2018–2022	West Ham United	63	(2)
2022–2024	AFC Bournemouth	12	(0)

International career
2011	England U19	1	(0)
- * Club domestic league appearances and goals as of 23:55, 11 March 2023 (UTC)

Ryan Marlowe Fredericks (born 10 October 1992) is an English professional footballer who plays as a right-back.

He has previously played for Tottenham Hotspur, Brentford, Millwall, Middlesbrough, Bristol City, Fulham, West Ham United, and most recently, AFC Bournemouth.

== Club career ==
=== Tottenham Hotspur ===
Born in Hammersmith, London, Fredericks joined the Tottenham Hotspur academy in July 2009. Although he was injured early in his career, he progressed through the academy to sign a professional contract with the club in July 2010. On 8 July 2011, Fredericks was awarded a new contract at the club.

Fredericks first made Tottenham's first team squad as an unused substitute in February 2010, in an FA Cup fourth round replay win over Leeds United. A year later, Fredericks started his first game for Tottenham on 25 August 2011, against Hearts, where he played on the right of midfield. He made his debut alongside Tom Carroll and Harry Kane. Fredericks then made his first Tottenham Hotspur appearance in two years, making a start, in the last group stage game of Europa League, where he won a penalty to allow Roberto Soldado converted the penalty successfully to score a hat-trick, in a 4–1 win over Anzhi Makhachkala on 12 December 2013. In January 2014, Fredericks signed a contract with Tottenham Hotspur that would keep him at the club until 2016.

==== Loan spells ====
On 10 August 2012, he signed on loan for League One club Brentford. He made his debut the following day in a 1–0 defeat against Walsall in the League Cup. He made his league debut on 18 August, in a 0–0 draw against Bury. He made his home debut on 22 September, in a 1–0 win against Oldham Athletic. Tottenham exercised the right to recall Fredericks to the Tottenham squad on 25 October 2012. Reflecting about his time at Brentford, Fredericks said the move benefited, as the player he is today.

On 17 January 2014, he switched to Championship side Millwall for a three-month loan. He made his début the following day, a home match against Ipswich Town, where he scored the only goal of the game with a lob from the right back position. After two appearances, Fredericks' loan spell at Millwall was extended until the end of the season. Fredericks became a first team regular at Millwall in the right-back position, making 14 appearances.

On 28 August 2014, Fredericks joined Middlesbrough for a season-long loan. However, he remained on the sidelines until he was called up to the first team by manager Aitor Karanka following Damià Abella's injury. His league debut came on 20 September 2014, where he played 90 minutes against former club Brentford and saw Middlesbrough win 4–0. He suffered a thigh injury during a match against Blackburn Rovers, and was sidelined for a month. He made his first appearance after returning from injury in a 1–0 win over Brentford on 31 January 2015. After appearing six times in nine appearances between February and March, Fredericks suffered a hamstring injury, which he sustained during a match against Nottingham Forest on 7 March 2015. After returning to training in early-April, Fredericks remained on the sidelines until 25 April 2015, playing the first hour of a 4–3 loss to Fulham. Despite being sidelined, Fredericks went on to make 17 appearances for Middlesbrough before returning to his parent club.

=== Bristol City ===
On 6 August 2015, Fredericks joined Bristol City on a permanent transfer, signing a three-year contract, and was given the number twelve shirt ahead of the new season. Fredericks stated the club's "open and attacking" football was his motivation for joining. Fredericks made his Bristol City debut, in the opening game of the season, where he played as a right-midfield before switching to left-midfield, in a 2–0 loss away at Sheffield Wednesday. However, after just twenty-six days at the club and making only five appearances in all competitions for the club, it was reported that Fredericks was on the verge of leaving Bristol City, citing personal reasons and that he would be returning to London to an unnamed side, which was later to be revealed as Fulham.

=== Fulham ===
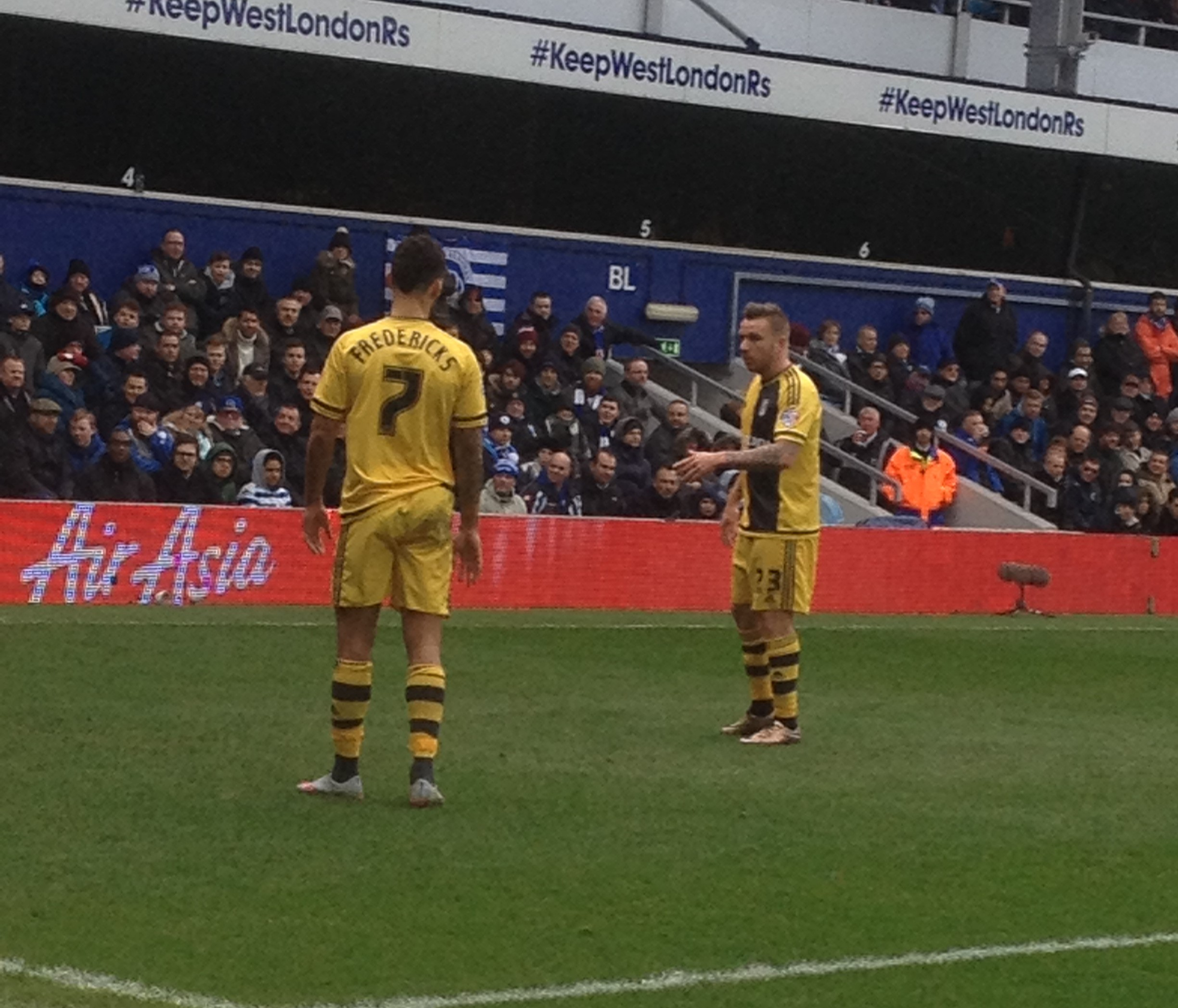
Fredericks (left, number 7) playing for Fulham.

He joined Championship club Fulham on a three-year contract on 31 August 2015, with the fee undisclosed.

Fredericks made his Fulham debut, coming on as a substitute for Ben Pringle in the 62nd minute, in a 2–1 win against Blackburn Rovers on 13 September 2015. He started out playing in the right–back position for the next two matches, before playing in the right–midfield position (whenever he came on as a substitute). For the rest of the season, Fredericks continued to play in either the right–back position and right–midfield position. Despite suffering injuries during the 2015–16 season Fredericks went on to make 36 appearances for Fulham in his first season.

In the 2016–17 season, Fredericks spent the start of the season with an ankle injury and was sidelined for between 10 and 12 weeks following surgery. It wasn't until 18 October 2016 when he returned to the first team from injury, starting the match in the right–back position, in a 2–2 draw against Norwich City. After returning from injury, he regained his first team place, in the right–back position. In a match against Wolverhampton Wanderers on 10 December 2016, Fredericks played a role for Fulham when he set up two goals, resulting a 4–4 draw. Seven days later, on 17 December 2016, he provided another assist in a match against Derby County, setting up a goal for Floyd Ayité, in a 2–2 draw. Three weeks later, on 8 January 2017, Fredericks played another important role against Cardiff City in the third round of the FA Cup when he set up the equaliser, in a 2–1 win; his performance earning him the Man of the Match award. However, in a match against Birmingham City on 4 February 2017, he was sent–off for a late tackle on Craig Gardner, in a 1–0 loss. After serving a three match suspension, Fredericks immediately regained his first team place in the right–back position, where he stayed for the rest of the season. He also played in both legs of the play-offs, which saw Reading win 2–1 on aggregate. Throughout the season, Fredericks' performance was praised, due to his passing stats and pace. By the end of the 2016–17 season, he had made 34 appearances in all competitions.

In the 2017–18 season, Fredericks continued to retain his first team place in the right–back position from the start of the campaign. After going three league matches without a win, he then played a role when he set up a goal for Neeskens Kebano, in a 2–1 win over Ipswich Town on 26 August 2017. Two weeks later, on 13 September 2017, Fredericks provided his second assist of the season, setting up the winning goal, in a 2–1 win over Hull City. He was an ever present in the first team from the start of the 2017–18 season until he suffered a foot injury that saw him miss one game. After returning from injury against Aston Villa on 21 October 2017, he regained his first team place. His performances at Fulham attracted interest from clubs such as Swansea City and Stoke City, but stayed at the club throughout January. His contributions led to Fulham reaching the play–offs and subsequently ended up gaining promotion to the Premier League after beating Aston Villa 1–0 in the final, where he started and played 83 minutes before being substituted. For his seasons performances, Fredericks was named in the EFL Championship team of the year in April 2018, along with teammate Ryan Sessegnon and Tom Cairney. He was also named in the Championship Team of the Season. At the end of the 2017–18 season, Fredericks had made 48 appearances in all competitions.

With his contract at Fulham expected to expire at the end of the 2017–18 season, Fredericks hinted about staying at Fulham.

=== West Ham United ===
Fredericks' free transfer to West Ham United was announced on 5 June 2018, joining on a four-year contract from Fulham. He made his debut on 12 August in a 4–0 defeat by Liverpool. He scored his first goal for West Ham in their 8–0 win over Macclesfield Town in the EFL Cup on 26 September 2018. On 9 February 2021, in an FA Cup game against Manchester United, Fredericks became the first concussion substitute in English football when he replaced Issa Diop following a head injury. In May 2022, West Ham announced that Fredericks would be leaving the club at the end of his contract on 30 June 2022. He played 77 times for West Ham, scoring three goals and making six assists across 4 seasons.

=== Bournemouth ===
On 22 June 2022, Fredericks signed for fellow Premier League side Bournemouth on a two-year contract on a free transfer. He made his debut coming on in the 69th minute to replace Jordan Zemura in the 0–0 draw against Wolverhampton Wanderers on 31 August.

On 5 June 2024, Bournemouth announced that Fredericks would depart the club in the summer when his contract expired, having been out of action due to a calf injury he suffered in March 2023.

== International career ==
Fredericks made a single appearance for the England under-19 team in 2011, in a 3–0 defeat against the Netherlands. Fredericks is also eligible to represent Guyana and Scotland through his grandfather.

== Personal life ==
Fredericks grew up in Potters Bar, attending Mount Grace School. Upon joining Fulham, Fredericks revealed that he had been a district champion in the 100m and the triple jump and had been offered athletics scholarships as a youth. Fredericks is a Christian.

== Career statistics ==
As of match played 11 March 2023

Appearances and goals by club, season and competition
Club	Season	League			FA Cup		League Cup		Other		Total	
Club	Season	Division	Apps	Goals	Apps	Goals	Apps	Goals	Apps	Goals	Apps	Goals
Tottenham Hotspur	2011–12	Premier League	0	0	0	0	0	0	3 (Note: Appearance(s) in UEFA Europa League)	0	3	0
Tottenham Hotspur	2012–13	Premier League	0	0	0	0	—		0	0	0	0
Tottenham Hotspur	2013–14	Premier League	0	0	0	0	0	0	1	0	1	0
Tottenham Hotspur	2014–15	Premier League	0	0	—		—		0	0	0	0
Tottenham Hotspur	Total		0	0	0	0	0	0	4	0	4	0
Brentford (loan)	2012–13	League One	4	0	—		1	0	0	0	5	0
Millwall (loan)	2013–14	Championship	14	1	—		—		—		14	1
Middlesbrough (loan)	2014–15	Championship	17	0	1	0	1	0	0	0	19	0
Bristol City	2015–16	Championship	4	0	—		1	0	—		5	0
Fulham	2015–16	Championship	32	0	0	0	—		—		32	0
Fulham	2016–17	Championship	30	0	2	0	0	0	2 (Note: Appearances in Championship play-offs)	0	34	0
Fulham	2017–18	Championship	44	0	1	0	0	0	3	0	48	0
Fulham	Total		106	0	3	0	0	0	5	0	114	0
West Ham United	2018–19	Premier League	15	1	1	0	2	1	—		18	2
West Ham United	2019–20	Premier League	27	0	1	0	0	0	—		28	0
West Ham United	2020–21	Premier League	14	1	2	0	0	0	—		16	1
West Ham United	2021–22	Premier League	7	0	2	0	1	0	5	0	15	0
West Ham United	Total		63	2	6	0	3	1	5	0	77	3
AFC Bournemouth	2022–23	Premier League	12	0	0	0	1	0	—		13	0
Career total			220	3	10	0	7	1	14	0	250	4

== Honours ==
Fulham

- EFL Championship play-offs: 2018

Individual

- PFA Team of the Year: 2017–18 Championship
- Championship Team of the Season: 2017–18
