= Battle of Alborán =

Battle in the Ottoman–Habsburg wars

Coordinates: 35.9167°N 3.0333°W

Battle of Alboran
- Part of Ottoman–Habsburg wars
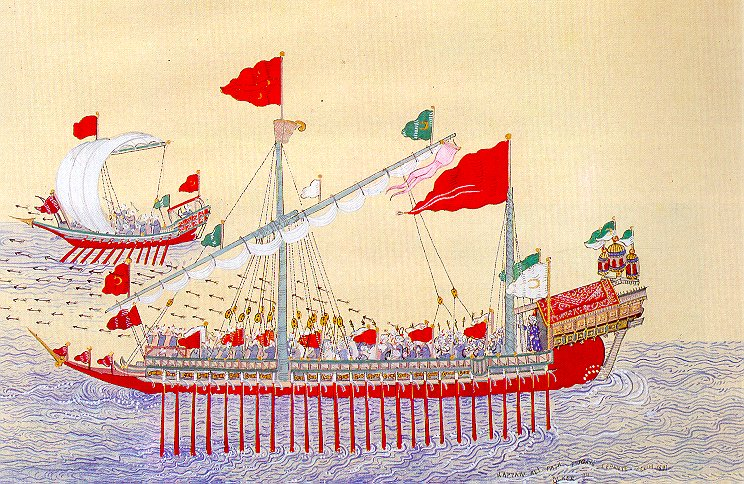
- An Ottoman Galley; image taken from a miniature.
Date	1 October 1540
Location	off Alboran, Spain
Result	Spanish victory

Belligerents
Spain	Ottoman Empire

Commanders and leaders
Bernardino de Mendoza (WIA)	Ali Hamet (POW)

Strength
10 galleys	3 galleys, 5 galliots, 6 fustas, 2 brigantines

Casualties and losses
137 killed, 500 wounded	1 galley sunk, 10 ships captured, 700 killed, 437 captured, 837 slaves freed

The battle of Alboran (Spanish: batalla de Alborán) took place on 1 October 1540 off the isle of Alboran during the Ottoman–Habsburg struggle for control of the Mediterranean when a Spanish fleet under the command of Bernardino de Mendoza destroyed an Ottoman fleet commanded by Ali Hamet, sinking a galley and capturing 10 other ships.

== Background ==
In mid-1540 the Barbary pirate Ali Hamet, a Sardinian renegade in service of the Ottoman Empire, formed a small fleet at Algiers, as ordered by Admiral Hayreddin Barbarossa. He assembled three galleys, five galliots, six fustas, and two brigantines, manned by 900 galley slaves and 2,000 Turkish soldiers and Valencian Moriscos under the command of General Caramani, a former slave in the Spanish galleys. In August, knowing that Spanish galleys were in the Balearic Islands, the fleet set sail to the western waters of the Alborán Sea. A few days later a thousand soldiers from the galleys landed on the beach of Gibraltar and attacked the village. Although they failed to capture the well-protected castle, 73 civilians were taken prisoner, 40 vessels moored in the port were plundered, and a galley under construction (owned by Don Álvaro de Bazán the Elder) was burnt. The prisoners were carried off to Vélez de la Gomera, on the Moroccan coast, where they were imprisoned until their release following a payment of 7,000 ducats.

== Battle ==
Bernardino de Mendoza, commander of the galleys of Spain, learned of the raid while in Denia. After being told that they had not gone through Oran, Mendoza anticipated that Hamet's fleet would return to Algiers along the African coast. Mendoza therefore sailed his 10 galleys to the west. On 1 October both fleets sighted each other near the island of Alborán. Hamet attacked the Spanish with great determination, hoping to use his numerical superiority to board Mendoza's ships; however, a Spanish artillery salvo inflicted severe damage on his ships before they could get close enough to engage the galleys.

Hamet and Caramani attempted unsuccessfully to board Mendoza's flagship. The Spanish commander, aware that the outcome of the battle depended heavily on this fight, ordered his soldiers and rowers to move to one side of the galley, raising the opposite side to act as a parapet against Hamet's galley's gunfire. Then Mendoza's soldiers boarded and captured Caramani's galley, killing Caramani and the majority of his crew. Next they boarded Hamet's galley and captured it, at which point Hamet jumped into the water and swam to another galley in his fleet.

A Spanish galley commanded by Pedro de Guerra sank one Ottoman galley with a single shot and captured another by boarding it. The galley Santa Ana, meanwhile, was attacked by two Algerian vessels, one of which was forced to surrender, while the other escaped. Hamet, who had been rescued by an Algerian galliot, was captured by Enrique Enríquez's galley while trying to escape. The battle ended with an incident during which Enrique Enríquez ordered his men to fire on an Ottoman galley believing it was still in Turkish hands. However, the crew of the Santa Bárbara had already captured the galley; seven Spanish died and twelve were injured.

== Aftermath ==
Of the 16 Ottoman ships, ten were captured and one sunk. More than 700 Turks, including all the captains, were killed. In addition, 427 of them were captured and 837 Christian slaves were freed. The Spanish, meanwhile, had 137 dead and about 500 wounded, including Bernardino de Mendoza, who was wounded in the head by an arquebus shot. To celebrate the victory a great procession was organized in Málaga, in which the freed prisoners, the crews of the Spanish galleys, their captains, and Bernardo de Mendoza himself participated. Shortly after the Emperor Charles V was informed of the victory by the Cardinal Archbishop of Toledo, who recommended the Emperor thank God for the victory.
