= Kasper Franck =

German theologian and controversialist

Kasper Franck (2 November 1543 – 12 March 1584) was a German theologian and controversialist.

== Life ==
Kasper Franck was born in Ortrand, Saxony. His parents were Lutherans, and he was initially a Protestant minister and preacher. Ladislaus von Fraunberg, Count of Haag (de) (1505–1566), who had recently introduced the reformed faith into his province, invited him to his court. The premature death, however, of Ladislaus prevented Franck from carrying out the proposed plans of reform.

Albert V, Duke of Bavaria, the successor of Ladislaus, resolved to restore the Catholic religion, and called in the convert and preacher, Martin Eisengrein. His intercourse with Eisengrein led Franck to an eventual conversion to Catholicism.

In 1566, he matriculated at the University of Ingolstadt, devoted himself to the study of the Church Fathers and the early Christian Church, and on 25 January 1568, made a formal profession of the Catholic faith. Albert recognized in him as a man of great usefulness and obtained from Pope Pius V a dispensation to have him ordained a priest.

Before beginning his missionary labours, he published a work setting forth the reasons and justification of his return to the ancient faith. His efforts in Haag and Kraiburg were crowned with success.

In 1572, he was again in the University of Ingolstadt, pursuing his theological studies and the following year he was appointed its rector, which office he again held later for several consecutive terms. On the occasion of the Jubilee in 1575, he set out for Rome, won at Siena a doctorate in theology, and shortly afterwards Pope Gregory XIII conferred on him the titles of Prothonotary Apostolic and Comes Lateranensis.

He died at Ingolstadt.

== Works ==
His polemical writings manifest care and an intimate familiarity with patristic literature. Among them are:

- Brevis et Pia Institutio de puro verbo Dei et clara S. Evangelii luce (Ingolstadt, 1571);
- Tractatus de ordinaria, legitima et apostolica vocatione sacerdotem et concionatorum, etc. (Inglolstat, 1571);
- Casperis Franci de externo, visibili et hiearchico, Ecclesiae Catholicae sacerdotio, (Cologne, 1575);
- Catalogus haereticorum (Ingolstadt, 1576);
- Explicatio totius historiae Passionis et Mortis Domini, etc. (Inglolstat, 1572);
- Fundamentum Catholicae Fidei contra Schmidelin (Ingolstadt, 1578).
