= Battle of Muros Bay =

1543 naval battle

Battle of Muros
- Part of the Italian War of 1542–1546
Date	25 July 1543
Location	Estuary of Muros, A Coruña, Galicia Spain 42°45′N 9°00′W
Result	Spanish victory

Belligerents
France	Spain

Commanders and leaders
Jean de Clamorgan	Álvaro de Bazán the Elder

Strength
25 warships	16 warships

Casualties and losses
More than 3,000 casualties 3,000 prisoners 23 ships captured 1 ship sunk (flagship)	300 dead and 500 wounded

The Battle of Muros Bay (Spanish: Batalla de Muros) took place on 25 July 1543, during the Italian War of 1542–1546, between the French fleet under Jean de Clamorgan, Lord of Soane and the Spanish fleet commanded by Alvaro de Bazan the Elder. This battle is considered to be the first large naval battle in the Atlantic Ocean.

== Background ==
In 1541, Francis I of France violated the Truce of Nice, allied with the Ottoman Empire, Denmark, and Sweden, and declared war on Spain. To be ready for war, Francis I made preparations to fight the navies of both Spain and England. As a part of the preparations, Francis I personally went to the port of Le Havre to oversee the preparations for war.

In addition, French Vice Admiral De Bury ordered the assembly of a second French fleet to attack Spain enlisting the ports of Bayonne and Bordeaux. Emperor Charles I of Spain fearing action in these waters ordered Álvaro de Bazán to proceed to the Bay of Biscay and assemble a fleet to try to prevent a French attack. In the Bay of Biscay Álvaro de Bazán created a fleet of vessels from Guipuzcoa and Vizcaya and stationed his fleet outside the port of Laredo, within reach of both the French and Cantabrian coast.

During this time, Álvaro de Bazán was ordered to transport infantry units to Flanders so used fifteen of his ships to transport troops to the city of Bruges where he delivered the infantry units at the end of June. While Álvaro de Bazán was still in Flanders, the French finished their naval preparations and sent thirty specially armed ships from the port of Bayonne to attack the Spanish coast. Although the French fleet had been formed by Vice Admiral De Bury, it was sent to attack the Spanish under the command of France's greatest seaman, Jean de Clamorgan.

On the coast of Galicia the French fleet captured two Spanish merchant ships, an error which caused Spanish Governor, Sancho de Leyva to send a warning to Álvaro de Bazán. At that time, Álvaro de Bazán was busy attempting to complete fitting out. Upon receiving the warning from Governor Leyva, he asked for and received reinforcements which helped him to complete the work on his ships.

On 10 July, the French fleet passed through the waters of Laredo, looted numerous villages including Lage, Corcubión, and held the city of Muros at ransom.

Given the urgency of the situation, Álvaro de Bazán sailed to Muros as fast as possible in an attempt to catch the French off guard.

Coat of arms of the Kingdom of France.

== Battle ==
The French ships were at anchor at Muros on 25 July 1543 when the fleet of the Álvaro de Bazán attacked. Although Álvaro de Bazán had only 16 ships, they were large ships and afforded the Spaniard an advantage over the 25 French ships. Álvaro de Bazán led his men into battle reminding them that the day of the battle was the Festivity of St. James, Patrón de España and that it would be impossible for the Spanish to lose a battle on that day.

In the battle, Álvaro de Bazán set his sights on the flagship of the French Admiral and the French corsair Hallebarde positioned nearby. Seeing that the enemy had the advantage, Álvaro de Bazán rammed and sunk the Admiral Clamorgan's flagship. Once he had sunk the French Admiral's flagship, Álvaro de Bazán turned his attention to the corsair Hallebarde, which his men boarded and captured.

== Aftermath ==
The fighting was fierce, lasting nearly two hours, and at the end, the French were decisively defeated. Of the 25 ships that composed the French invasion fleet, only one escaped. Although the Spanish suffered 800 casualties, French casualties exceeded 3,000.

Emperor Charles I of Spain and his son, Prince Philip, were pleased with the great victory won by Álvaro de Bazán. With the defeat of the fleet, the French no longer posed a threat to the coastal towns of northern Spain and the Spanish gained control of the Cantabrian Sea.
