= Odysseas Adam =

Greek volleyball player (born 1997)

Personal information
- Nationality: Greek
- Born: 18 February 1997 (age 29)
- Height: 1.97 cm (1 in)

Volleyball information
- Position: Setter
- Current club: (Greece) Foinikas Syros
- Number: 7

Career
Years	Teams
2015–2016; 2016–2017; 2017–2018; 2018-	(England) Team Northumbria (England) Polonia London (Greece) Iraklis Chalkidas (Greece) Foinikas Syros

Odysseas Adam (born 18 February 1997) is a Greek volleyball player, a member of the club Foinikas Syros.

== Sporting achievements ==
=== Clubs ===
English Cup:

- 2017

English Championship:

- 2017
- 2016

Greece Championship:

- 2019
