= Odysseas Spyridis =

Cypriot footballer

Personal information
- Date of birth: 17 January 2001 (age 25)
- Place of birth: Volos, Greece
- Height: 1.72 m (5 ft 8 in)
- Position: Left winger

Youth career
- Digenis Akritas Morphou
- 2013–2019: West Ham United

Senior career*
| Years | Team | Apps | (Gls) |
| 2021–2023 | PAOK B | 28 | (0) |
| 2023–2024 | Iraklis | 25 | (2) |
| 2024–2025 | Niki Volos | 15 | (1) |
| 2025–2026 | Ayia Napa | 12 | (1) |
| 2026 | Egaleo | 4 | (0) |
- * Club domestic league appearances and goals as of 21 April 2026

Odysseas Spyridis (Greek: Οδυσσέας Σπυρίδης; born 17 January 2001) is a Cypriot professional footballer who plays as a winger.

== Career ==
Born in Volos, Greece, Spyridis moved to Cyprus whilst one month old. On the island, Spyridis played for Digenis Akritas Morphou, before moving to England in 2013, joining West Ham United. In May 2019, after six years at the club, West Ham confirmed Spyridis was one of four scholars to be released by the club. In September 2021, Spyridis signed for the newly formed Greek club PAOK B.

== Style of play ==
PAOK describe Spyridis as a left winger with "trickery and pace as his chief weapons" alongside "good technique and an appetite for hard work and further development".
