= Jean de Clamorgan =

French cartographer, navigator and military commander

- Born: c. 1480
- Died: unknown
- Military career
- Allegiance: Kingdom of France
- Branch: French Navy
- Rank: Admiral
- Conflicts: Battle of Muros Bay

Jean de Clamorgan, Lord of Saane (c. 1480 in the diocese of Coutances – ?), was a cartographer, navigator and military commander. Clamorgan is considered to be one of the best French admirals of the Marine Royale.

Having long served in the French Navy, Francis I of France made him captain of the Ponant being the first to receive this title. After his defeat at the Battle of Muros Bay in 1543 he retired to his land. He wrote a famous treatise on wolf hunting (La chasse du loup), published in 1567. He was also the author of a world map that Francis put in his library. The exact date of his death is not known.
