= 1614 =

1614 in various calendars
- Gregorian calendar: 1614; MDCXIV
- Ab urbe condita: 2367
- Armenian calendar: 1063; ԹՎ ՌԿԳ
- Assyrian calendar: 6364
- Balinese saka calendar: 1535–1536
- Bengali calendar: 1020–1021
- Berber calendar: 2564
- English Regnal year: 11 Ja. 1 – 12 Ja. 1
- Buddhist calendar: 2158
- Burmese calendar: 976
- Byzantine calendar: 7122–7123
- Chinese calendar: 癸丑年 (Water Ox); 4311 or 4104 — to — 甲寅年 (Wood Tiger); 4312 or 4105
- Coptic calendar: 1330–1331
- Discordian calendar: 2780
- Ethiopian calendar: 1606–1607
- Hebrew calendar: 5374–5375
- Hindu calendars
- Vikram Samvat: 1670–1671
- Shaka Samvat: 1535–1536
- Kali Yuga: 4714–4715
- Holocene calendar: 11614
- Igbo calendar: 614–615
- Iranian calendar: 992–993
- Islamic calendar: 1022–1023
- Japanese calendar: Keichō 19 (慶長１９年)
- Javanese calendar: 1534–1535
- Julian calendar: Gregorian minus 10 days
- Korean calendar: 3947
- Minguo calendar: 298 before ROC 民前298年
- Nanakshahi calendar: 146
- Thai solar calendar: 2156–2157
- Tibetan calendar: ཆུ་མོ་གླང་ལོ་ (female Water-Ox); 1740 or 1359 or 587 — to — ཤིང་ཕོ་སྟག་ལོ་ (male Wood-Tiger); 1741 or 1360 or 588

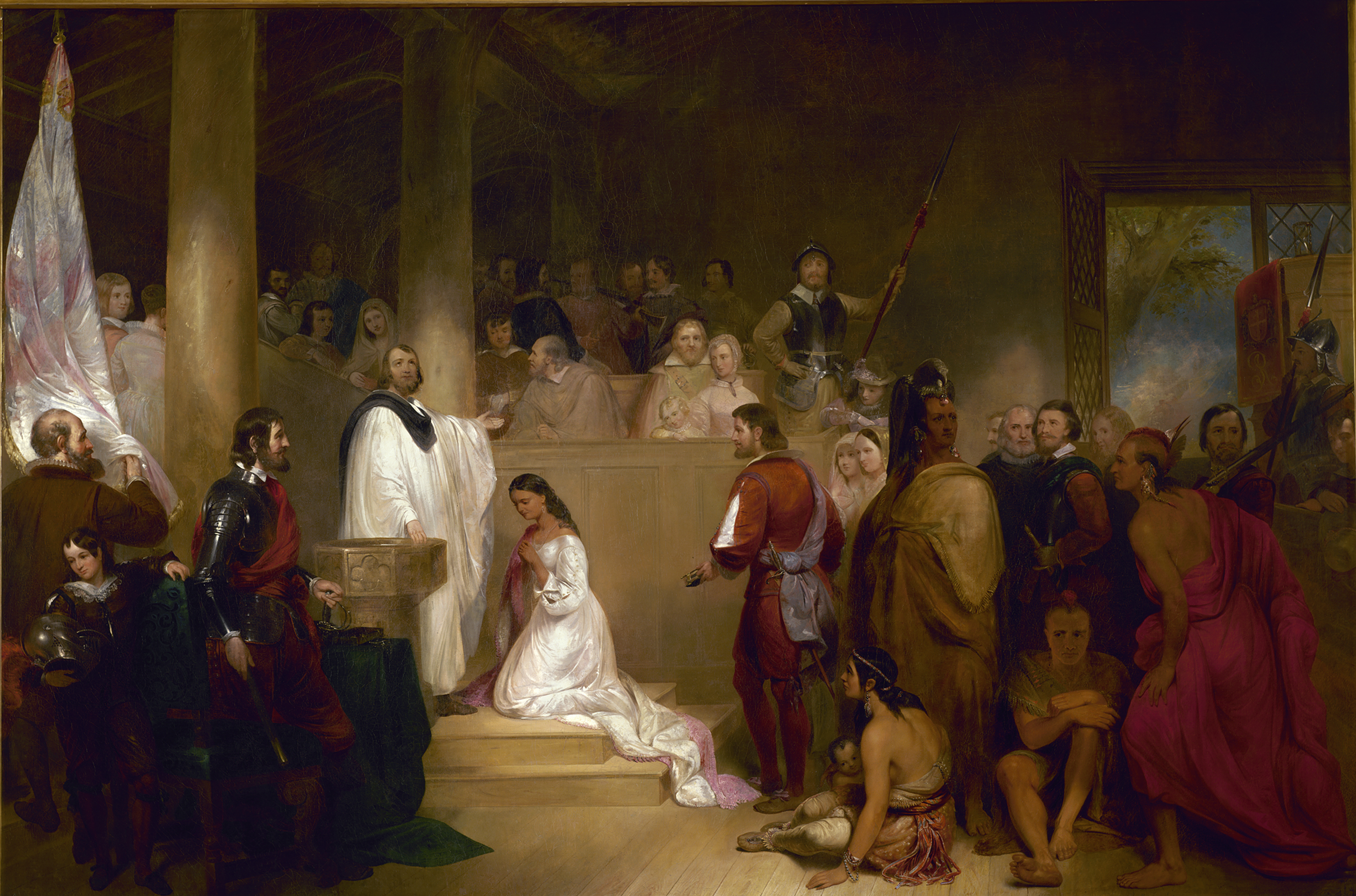
April 5: Pocahontas marries John Rolfe.

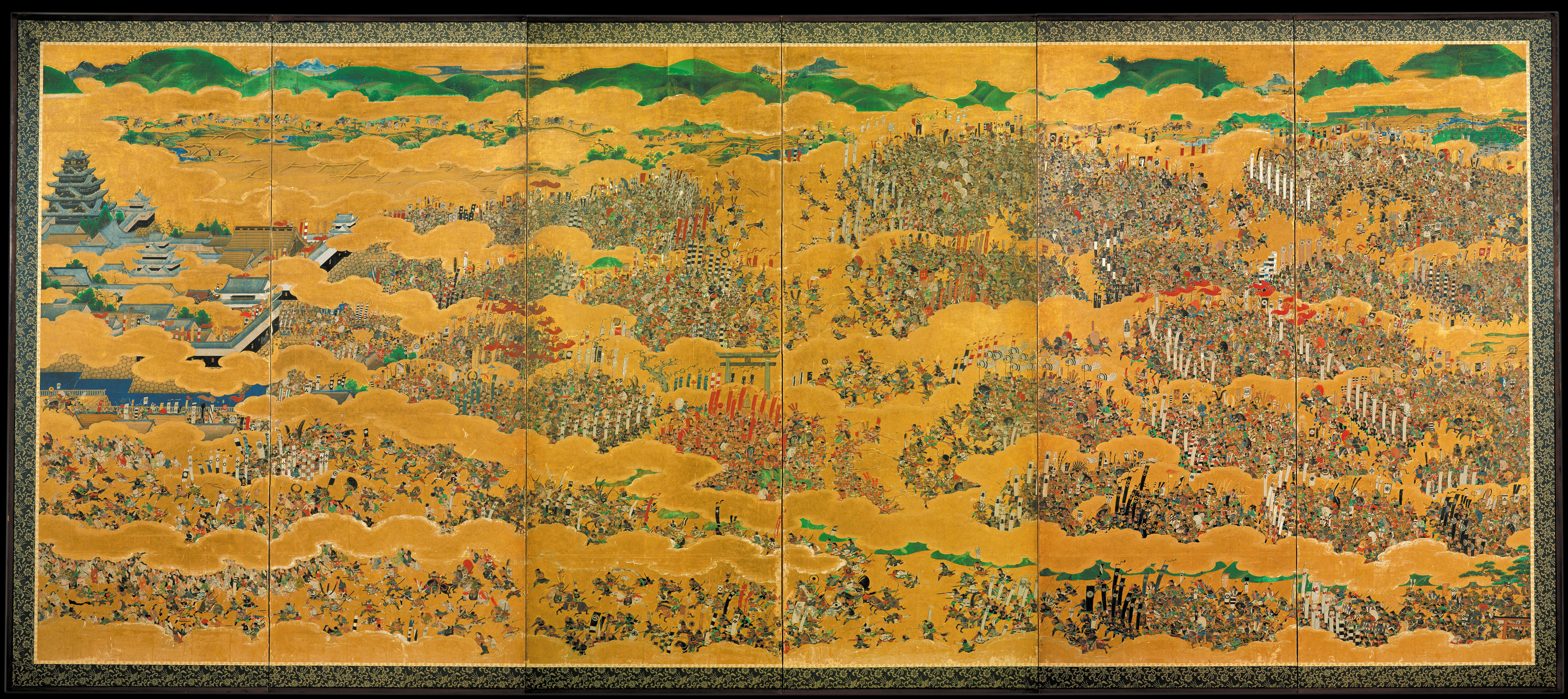
December 4: Start of the Siege of Osaka

1614 (MDCXIV) was a common year starting on Wednesday of the Gregorian calendar and a common year starting on Saturday of the Julian calendar, the 1614th year of the Common Era (CE) and Anno Domini (AD) designations, the 614th year of the 2nd millennium, the 14th year of the 17th century, and the 5th year of the 1610s decade. As of the start of 1614, the Gregorian calendar was 10 days ahead of the Julian calendar, which remained in localized use until 1923.

== Events ==
=== January–March ===
- January 22 – Led by Hasekura Tsunenaga, Japan's trade expedition to New Spain (modern-day Mexico) arrives on the Mexican coast with 22 samurai, 120 Japanese merchants, sailors and servants, and 40 Spaniards and Portuguese who serve as interpreters. Having reached the Americas after a voyage that began on October 28, the expedition travels to Acapulco and arrives on January 25.
- January 27 – The Noordsche Compagnie is founded in the Netherlands at Vlieland as a cartel in the whaling market.
- February 1 – In Japan, the practice of Christianity is banned, and an edict is issued for the expulsion of all foreign missionaries.
- February 2 – Iran's Safavid dynasty Emperor, Abbas the Great, carries out the execution of his oldest son, Crown Prince Mohammad Baqer Mirza, on suspicion that his son is planning to kill him.
- February 14 (February 4 O.S.) – King James I of England issues his proclamation Against Private Challenges and Combats in an effort to end duels.
- February 20 – Matthias I, Archduke of Austria, King of Hungary, Croatia and Bohemia, and Holy Roman Emperor, directs the restoration of Roman Catholic rule to Aachen, allowing the Army of Flanders (from the Spanish Netherlands) to lay siege to the German town.
- March 15 – Construction begins on the Takada Castle in Japan.
- March 17 – The States General of the Republic of the Seven United Netherlands authorizes an exclusive monopoly for trade in the New World, providing for the winning company to be able to make four voyages to the eastern coast of North America between 40° N and 45° N, encompassing the area that becomes the U.S. state of New Jersey. The New Netherland Company receives the exclusive patent, effective January 1, 1615.

=== April–June ===
- April 15 (April 5 O.S.)
  - Pocahontas, the 17-year-old daughter of Mamanatowick Wahunsenacawh of the Powhatan Algonquian native tribe in the modern-day U.S. state of Virginia, is forced into child marriage with English colonist John Rolfe at Jamestown, a year after her capture in war. She is given the name of Rebecca Rolfe and departs with John Rolfe to England in 1616, dying before she can return.
  - The Addled Parliament is assembled in England as the second parliament of King James I, and the first in more than nine years. Its members serve for two months. A new parliament will not be seated until more than six years later.
  - The Republic of the Netherlands and the Kingdom of Sweden enter into a treaty at the Hague.
- April 30 – The Kingdom of Lan Na (in modern-day northern Thailand) is invaded by 17,000 troops commanded by King Anaukpetlun of Burma (modern Myanmar). Lan Na's King Thado Kyaw is unsuccessful in getting assistance from the Kingdom of Siam, and turns to the Kingdom of Lan Xang (modern Laos), which provides assistance.
- May 14 – An earthquake strikes the Azores islands and levels the village of Vila Franca do Campo.
- May 15 – The Queen Regent of France, Marie de' Medici, convenes the Estates General to suppress a rebellion by Henri II, Prince of Condé.
- May 17 – Battle of Rohatyn: Mutinous "konfederacja" Polish troops are defeated by the Polish Army, led by General Stanisław Koniecpolski, the largest instance of Mutiny in Polish history up until that point. The mutiny originated in 1612 as a response to a failed Polish occupation of Moscow, and the unpopularity of the Polish–Russian War (1609–1618) within the Sejm, which was being funded by taxation on Pole nobles, causing both criticism from parliament and mutiny among the regular army, leaving Aleksander Józef Lisowski as the lifeblood of the Polish-Lithuanian war effort during the 1612–1617 phase of the war, leading 6 divisions of outlaw mercenaries against the Russians.
- June 7 – The Addled Parliament is dissolved by King James I of England, having sat for two months without imposing any new taxes.

=== July–September ===
- July 6 – Raid of Żejtun: Ottoman forces make a final attempt to conquer the island of Malta, but are beaten back by the Knights Hospitaller.
- July 16
  - In reprisal for the attempt of "the False Dmitry", a man who claimed to be the son of Ivan the Terrible, to claim the throne, Tsar Michael of Russia has Dmitry's 3-year-old son, Ivan Dmitriyevich, publicly hanged in Moscow.
  - Ingrian war: The Swedish Empire wins a decisive victory against Tsarist Russia in Battle of Bronnitsy.
- July – Dutch merchant Adriaen Block returns to Amsterdam in the Onrust, having become the first European to enter Long Island Sound and the Connecticut River, and determined that Long Island is an island. He publishes a map of "New Netherland".
- August 23 – The University of Groningen is established in the Dutch Republic.
- August 24 – The Siege of Aachen begins as the Spanish Army of Flanders, commanded by Amrogio Spinola, attacks with 15,000 troops. The 600-man defense force from Brandenburg surrenders a few days later.
- September 1 – In England, lawyer Sir Julius Caesar becomes Master of the Rolls.

=== October–December ===
- October 2 – After Louis XIII reaches the age of 13, he is given full power as King of France and the regency of his mother is ended. Queen Regent Marie retains her position as leader of the Conseil du Roi, however, and continues to control the French government.
- October 11 – Adriaen Block and a group of Amsterdam merchants petition the States General of the Northern Netherlands for exclusive trading rights, in the area he explored and named "New Netherland".
- October 13 – The second War of the Jülich Succession, which flared up a second time in May, comes to an end.
- October 17 – On the orders of Ahmed I, Sultan of the Ottoman Empire, Grand Vizier Nasuh Pasha is strangled to death by the chief of the Sultan's bodyguards.
- October 27 – The French Estates General begins its last session. The session, with 464 deputies representing the nobility, the lower and middle classes, and the clergy, closes on February 23, 1615. For the next 175 years, the Kingdom of France will be governed as an absolute monarchy until the calling of a new Estates General in 1789 at the start of the French Revolution.
- November 12 – The Treaty of Xanten ends the War of the Jülich Succession.
- November 19 – Hostilities resulting from an attempt by Toyotomi Hideyori to restore Osaka Castle begin. Tokugawa Ieyasu, father of the shōgun, is outraged at this act, and leads three thousand men across the Kizu River, destroying the fort there.
- December 4 – The Siege of Osaka begins in Japan.

=== Date unknown ===
- Scottish mathematician John Napier publishes Mirifici Logarithmorum Canonis Descriptio (Description of the Admirable Table of Logarithms), outlining his discovery of logarithms, and incorporating the decimal mark.
- Astronomer Johannes Kepler soon begins to employ logarithms, in his description of the Solar System.
- Squanto (also known as Tisquantum), a Native American of the Wampanoag Nation, is kidnapped and enslaved by Thomas Hunt, an English sea captain working with Captain John Smith. Freed in Spain, Squanto will travel for five years in Europe and North America, before returning to his home in Plymouth, Massachusetts. Twenty months later, he will be able to teach the Pilgrim Fathers the basics of farming and trade in the New World.
- The Fama Fraternitatis is published, the first of three allegorical Rosicrucian manifestoes in the Holy Roman Empire.
- Possible date – John Webster's revenge tragedy The Duchess of Malfi is first performed in public, at the newly-reconstructed Globe Theatre in London.

== Births ==
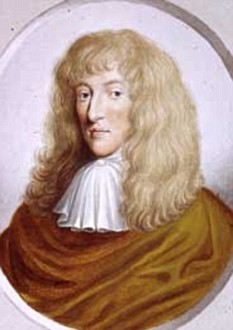
Christopher Merret

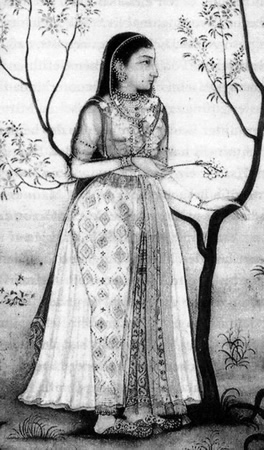
Jahanara Begum

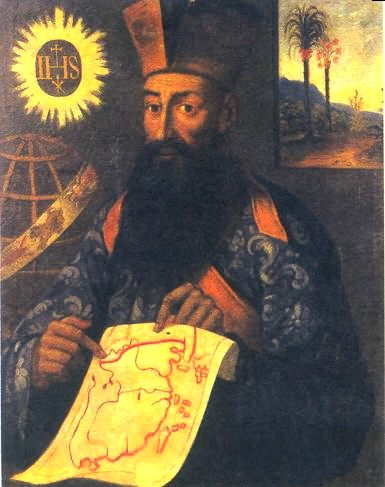
Martino Martini

=== January–March ===
- January 1
  - Frederick Henry, Hereditary Prince of the Palatinate (d. 1629)
  - Luis Guillermo de Moncada, 7th Duke of Montalto, Spanish Catholic cardinal (d. 1672)
- January 5 – Archduke Leopold Wilhelm of Austria, Governor of the Spanish Netherlands (d. 1662)
- January 10 – Kanō Yasunobu, Japanese painter of the Kanō school of painting, during the Edo period (d. 1685)
- January 20 – Samuel Gott, English politician (d. 1671)
- February 2 – Robert Ellison, English politician (d. 1678)
- February 8 – Thomas Wendy, English politician (d. 1673)
- February 14 – John Wilkins, English bishop, academic and natural philosopher (d. 1672)
- February 16 – Christopher Merret, English physician and scientist (d. 1695)
- March 3 – Sir Peter Leycester, 1st Baronet, British historian (d. 1678)
- March 8 – Hendrik van der Borcht II, German painter (d. 1676)
- March 15 – Franciscus Sylvius, Dutch physician and scientist (d. 1672)
- March 25
  - Thomas Chicheley, English politician who falls from favour during the reign of James II (d. 1699)
  - Juan Carreño de Miranda, Spanish artist (d. 1685)

=== April–June ===
- April 1 – Martin Schoock, Dutch academic (d. 1669)
- April 2 – Jahanara Begum, Mughal princess (d. 1681)
- April 10 – William Thompson, English Member of Parliament (d. 1681)
- April 11 – Helena Fourment, Dutch model, second wife of Peter Paul Rubens (d. 1673)
- April 18 – Nicolas Robert, French painter (d. 1685)
- April 25
  - Hieronymus van Beverningh, Dutch diplomat and politician (d. 1690)
  - Marc'Antonio Pasqualini, Italian opera singer and composer (d. 1691)
- May 10 – Zacharias Wagenaer, secretary, painter, then merchant and administrator (Dutch East-India Company) (d. 1668)
- May 12 – Giovanni Bernardo Carboni, Italian painter (d. 1683)
- May 28 – Gustav Evertsson Horn, Finnish-Swedish politician, Field Marshal (d. 1666)
- June 15 – Emilie of Oldenburg-Delmenhorst, Regent of Schwarzburg-Rudolstadt (1646–1662) (d. 1670)
- June 24 – John Belasyse, 1st Baron Belasyse of England (d. 1689)

=== July–September ===
- July 10 – Arthur Annesley, 1st Earl of Anglesey, English royalist statesman (d. 1686)
- July 23 – Bonaventura Peeters the Elder, Flemish marine painter (d. 1652)
- August 3 – Juan de Arellano, Spanish artist (d. 1676)
- August 13 – Augustus, Duke of Saxe-Weissenfels, administrator of the archbishopric of Magdeburg (d. 1680)
- September 7 – Gustaf Otto Stenbock, Swedish soldier and politician (d. 1685)
- September 11 – Philipp Buchner, German composer (d. 1669)
- September 12 – Robert Packer, English politician (d. 1682)
- September 20 – Martino Martini, Italian missionary, cartographer and historian (d. 1661)
- September 25 – Giles Hungerford, English politician (d. 1685)
- September 27 – Daniel Hallé, French painter (d. 1675)
- September 28 – Juan Hidalgo de Polanco, Spanish composer (d. 1685)

=== October–December ===
- October 3 – Sigmund von Erlach, Swiss politician (d. 1699)
- October 6 – Francesco de' Medici, Tuscan prince (d. 1634)
- October 12 – Henry More, English philosopher (d. 1687)
- October 13 – Thomas Jones, English politician and judge (d. 1692)
- October 20 (bapt.) – Franciscus Mercurius van Helmont, Flemish alchemist (d. 1698)
- November 2 – Philip Dietrich, Count of Waldeck-Eisenberg (1640–1645) (d. 1645)
- November 4 – Alexander Charles Vasa, 5th son of King Sigismund III of Poland (d. 1634)
- November 11 – John Bulkeley, English politician (d. 1662)
- November 27 – Fernando de Meneses, 2nd Count of Ericeira, Portuguese noble (d. 1699)
- November 30 – William Howard, 1st Viscount Stafford of England (d. 1680)
- December 16 – Eberhard III, Duke of Württemberg (d. 1674)
- December 21 – Francis Anderson, English politician (d. 1679)
- December 27 – Béatrix de Cusance, Frenc-Comtois noble woman (d. 1663)
- December 31 – Mechtilde of the Blessed Sacrament, French nun (d. 1698)

=== Date unknown ===
- Song Wan, Qing dynasty poet and politician

== Deaths ==
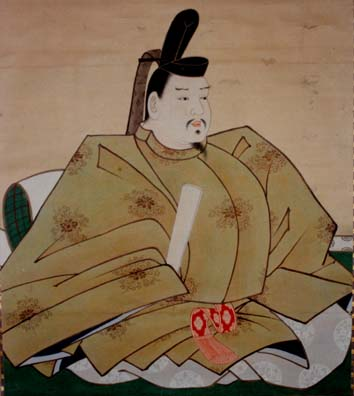
Maeda Toshinaga

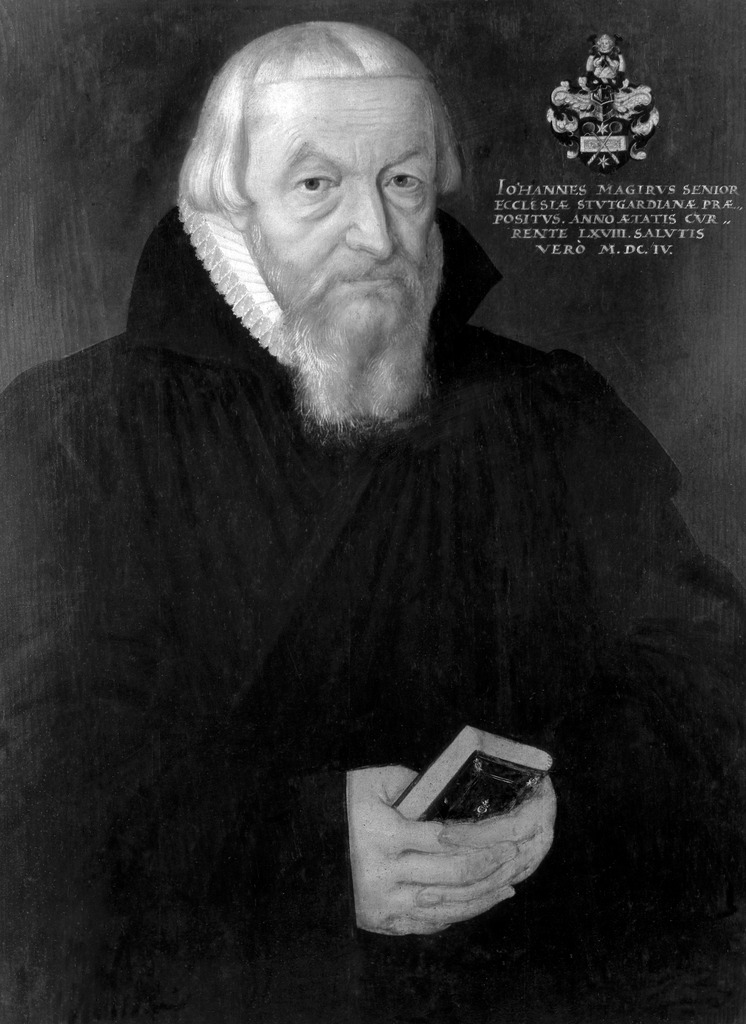
Johannes Magirus the elder

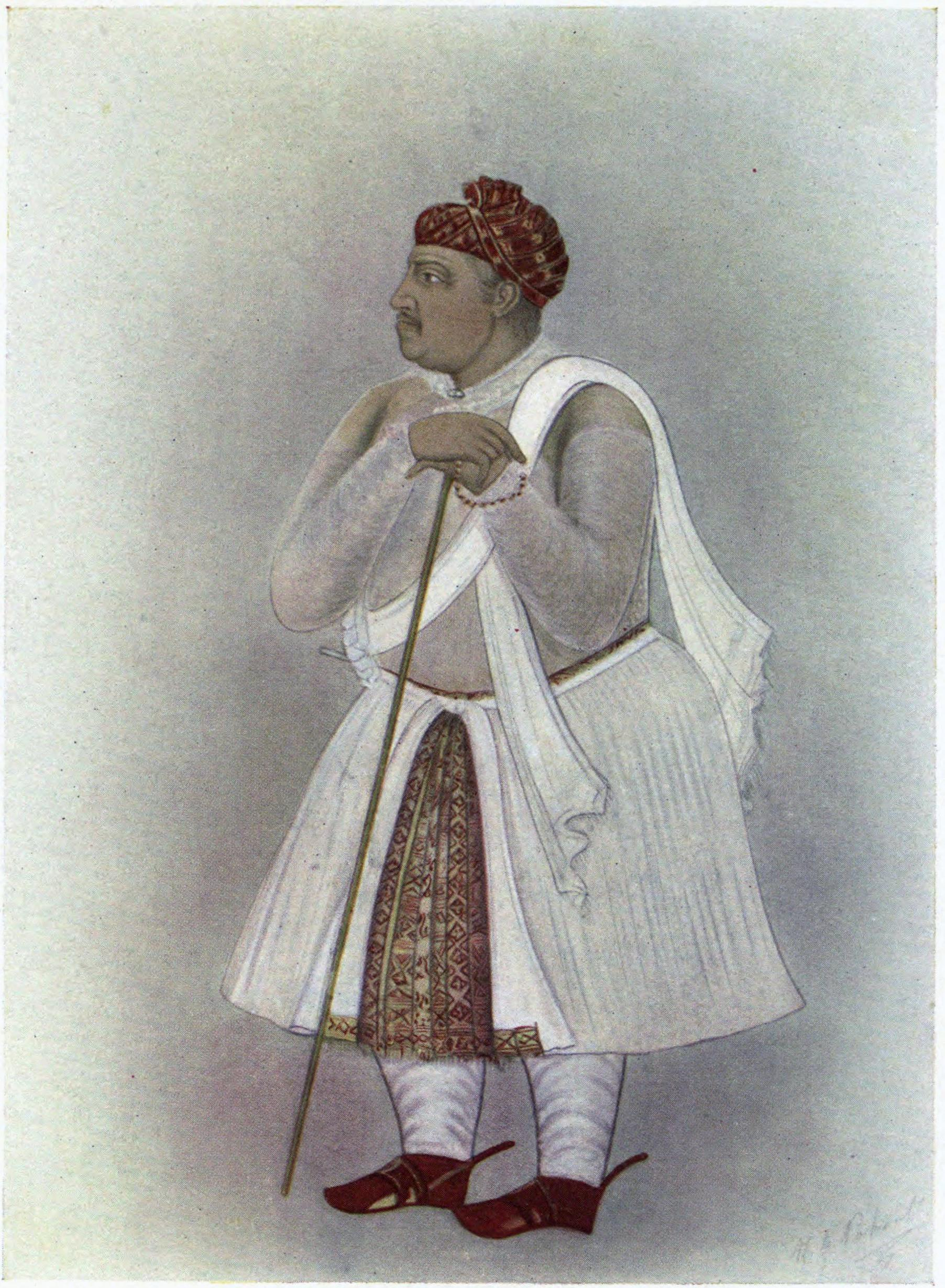
Man Singh I

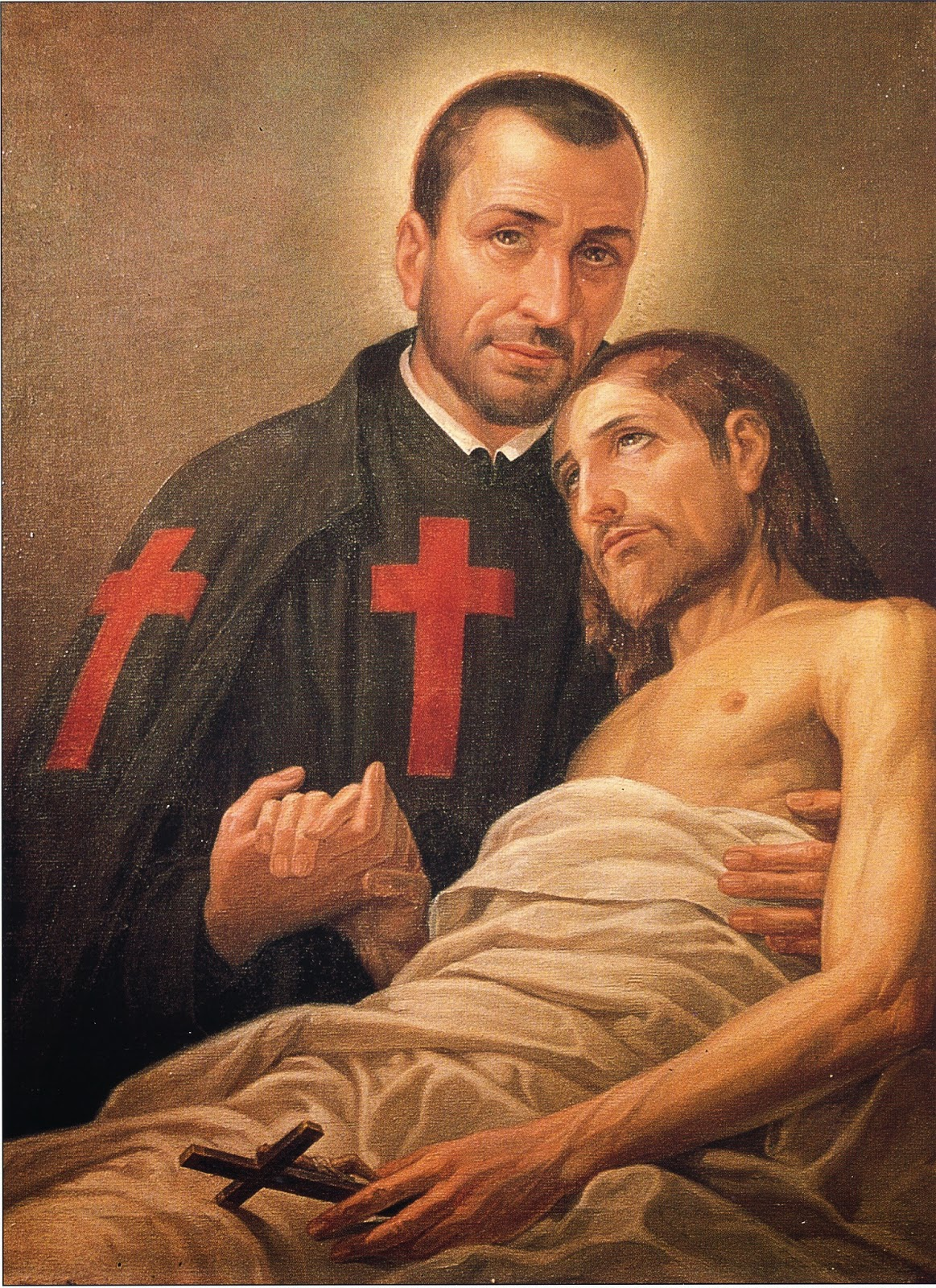
Camillus de Lellis

=== January–March ===
- January 2 – Serafino Porrecta, Italian theologian (b. 1536)
- January 21 – Morosina Morosini-Grimani, Venetian patrician and dogaressa (b. 1545)
- February 5 – Jakob Ebert, German theologian (b. 1549)
- February 13 – Thomas Cambell, Lord Mayor of London (b. 1536)
- February 23 – Murakoshi Naoyoshi, Japanese samurai (b. 1562)
- February 27 – John Harington, 2nd Baron Harington of Exton, England (b. 1592)
- February 28 – Jean Richardot the Younger, Belgian politician (b. 1570)
- March 5 – Thomas Pounde, English Jesuit lay brother (b. 1538)
- March 8 – Ebba Stenbock, politically active Swedish-Finnish noblewoman
- March 14 – Henrich Smet, Flemish physician (b. 1535)
- March 22 – Filippo Salviati, Italian astronomer (b. 1582)

=== April–June ===
- April 2 – Henri de Montmorency, 3rd Duke of Montmorency, Marshal of France (b. 1534)
- April 7 – El Greco, or Domênikos Theotokópoulos (Greek: Δομήνικος Θεοτοκόπουλος), Cretian painter, sculptor and architect (b. 1541)
- April 28 – John Egerton, English politician (b. 1551)
- May 3 – Sasbout Vosmeer, Dutch Apostolic Vicar (b. 1548)
- June 13 – Sengoku Hidehisa, Japanese daimyō (b. 1552)
- June 15 – Henry Howard, 1st Earl of Northampton, important English aristocrat and courtier (b. 1540)
- June 17 – William Bathe, Irish Jesuit priest (b. 1564)
- June 21 – Bartholomäus Scultetus, mayor of Görlitz (b. 1540)
- June 27 – Maeda Toshinaga, Japanese daimyō (b. 1562)

=== July–September ===
- July 1
  - Maximilian of Austria, Roman Catholic prelate who served as Archbishop of Santiago de Compostela (1603–1614) (b. 1555)
  - Isaac Casaubon, French-born classical scholar (b. 1559)
- July 4 – Johannes Magirus the elder, German Lutheran theologian (b. 1537)
- July 6
  - Sir Anthony Cope, 1st Baronet, English politician (b. 1548)
  - Man Singh I, Rajput Raja of Amer, India (b. 1550)
- July 14 – Camillus de Lellis, Italian saint (b. 1550)
- July 15 – Pierre de Bourdeille, seigneur de Brantôme, French historian and biographer
- July 16 – Tsarevich Ivan Dmitriyevich, pretender to the Russian throne, son of False Dmitry II (b. 1611)
- July 19 – Akizuki Tanenaga, Japanese samurai (b. 1567)
- July 28 – Felix Plater, Swiss physician (b. 1536)
- July 30 – Walter Cope, English noble (b. 1553)
- August 3 – François de Bourbon, Prince of Conti, third son of Louis I de Bourbon (b. 1558)
- August 11 – Lavinia Fontana, Italian painter (b. 1552)
- August 21 – Elizabeth Báthory, Hungarian noblewoman and purported serial killer (b. 1560)
- August 22 – Philipp Ludwig, Count Palatine of Neuburg, Duke of Palatinate-Neuburg from 1569 until 1614 (b. 1547)
- September – Giovanni de Macque, Dutch composer (b. c. 1550)
- September 21 – Jerome Gratian, Spanish Carmelite and writer (b. 1545)

=== October–December ===
- October 2 – Carlo Sellitto, Italian painter (b. 1581)
- October 9 – Bonaventura Vulcanius, Flemish Renaissance humanist (b. 1538)
- October 15 – Peder Claussøn Friis, Norwegian clergyman and author (b. 1545)
- October 26 – Sibylla of Anhalt, Duchess consort of Württemberg (1593–1608) (b. 1564)
- November 15 – Catherine, Duchess of Braganza, Portuguese infanta (princess), claimant to the throne following the death of King Henry (b. 1540)
- November 29 – Mogami Yoshiaki, Japanese daimyō of the Yamagata domain (b. 1546)
- December 27 – Maximiliaan de Vriendt, Dutch new Latin poet and a civic office-holder in the city of Ghent (b. 1559)
