= 1540 =

1540 in various calendars
- Gregorian calendar: 1540; MDXL
- Ab urbe condita: 2293
- Armenian calendar: 989; ԹՎ ՋՁԹ
- Assyrian calendar: 6290
- Balinese saka calendar: 1461–1462
- Bengali calendar: 946–947
- Berber calendar: 2490
- English Regnal year: 31 Hen. 8 – 32 Hen. 8
- Buddhist calendar: 2084
- Burmese calendar: 902
- Byzantine calendar: 7048–7049
- Chinese calendar: 己亥年 (Earth Pig); 4237 or 4030 — to — 庚子年 (Metal Rat); 4238 or 4031
- Coptic calendar: 1256–1257
- Discordian calendar: 2706
- Ethiopian calendar: 1532–1533
- Hebrew calendar: 5300–5301
- Hindu calendars
- Vikram Samvat: 1596–1597
- Shaka Samvat: 1461–1462
- Kali Yuga: 4640–4641
- Holocene calendar: 11540
- Igbo calendar: 540–541
- Iranian calendar: 918–919
- Islamic calendar: 946–947
- Japanese calendar: Tenbun 9 (天文９年)
- Javanese calendar: 1458–1459
- Julian calendar: 1540; MDXL
- Korean calendar: 3873
- Minguo calendar: 372 before ROC 民前372年
- Nanakshahi calendar: 72
- Thai solar calendar: 2082–2083
- Tibetan calendar: ས་མོ་ཕག་ལོ་ (female Earth-Boar); 1666 or 1285 or 513 — to — ལྕགས་ཕོ་བྱི་བ་ལོ་ (male Iron-Rat); 1667 or 1286 or 514

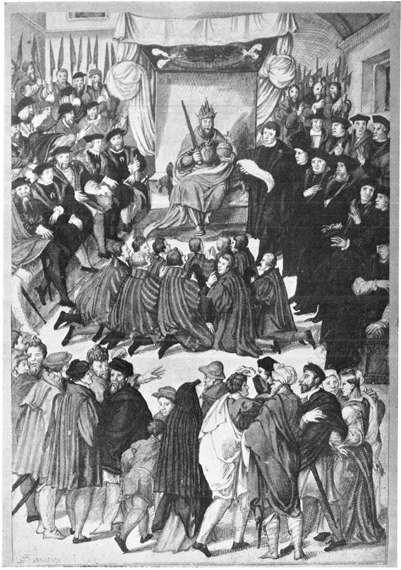
February 14: Holy Roman Emperor Charles V ends Revolt of Ghent, leaves rebels begging for mercy

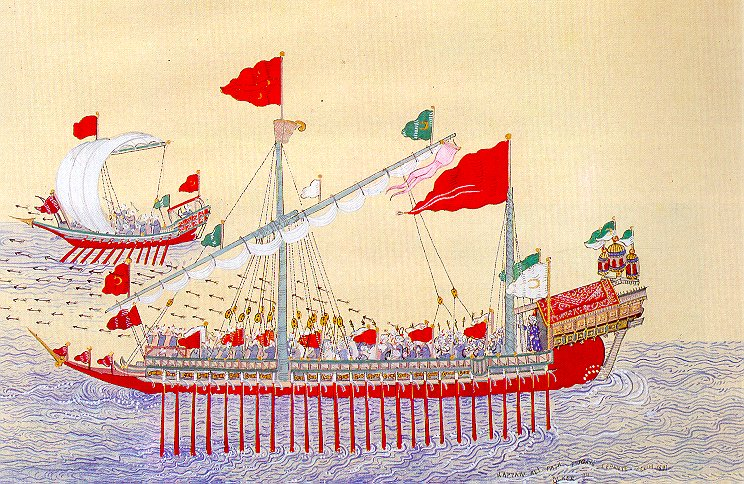
October 1: Battle of Alborán

Year 1540 (MDXL) was a leap year starting on Thursday of the Julian calendar.

== Events ==
=== January–March ===
- January 6 – King Henry VIII marries Anne of Cleves, his fourth Queen consort; the marriage lasts six months.
- February 14 – Charles V, Holy Roman Emperor, enters Ghent without resistance, and executes rebels, ending the Revolt of Ghent (1539–1540).
- March 23 – Waltham Abbey is the last to be closed as part of Henry VIII of England's dissolution of the monasteries.

=== April–June ===
- April 3– Estêvão da Gama becomes the new Governor of Portuguese India.
- April 7– The English cathedral priories of Canterbury and Rochester are transformed into secular cathedral chapters on Easter Sunday, concluding the Dissolution of the monasteries.
- April 12– Printing of the first translation of the New Testament into the Icelandic language is completed after King Christian III of Denmark finishes having Oddur Gottskálksson's text compared to the original Latin.
- May 17 – Battle of Kannauj: Sher Shah Suri defeats and deposes Mughal Emperor Humayan, establishing the Sur Empire.
- June 10 – Thomas Cromwell, Chief Minister for King Henry VIII, is arrested at meeting of the Privy Council of England at Westminster and charged with treason. Cromwell is removed from his positions as Chancellor of the Exchequer, Lord Privy Seal, Lord Great Chamberlain and Governor of the Isle of Wight, and will be executed on July 28.

=== July–September ===
- July 7 – Spanish conquistador Francisco Vázquez de Coronado captures Hawikuh in modern-day New Mexico, at this time known as part of Cíbola, but fails to find the legendary gold.
- July 9 – English King Henry VIII's marriage to Anne of Cleves, his fourth Queen consort, is annulled.
- July 28 – Thomas Cromwell, is executed for treason publicly in London on the orders of king Henry VIII of England. Henry marries his fifth wife, Catherine Howard, on the same day.
- July 30 – At Smithfield, London, three Lutheran pastors, Robert Barnes, Thomas Gerrard and William Jerome, are burnt at the stake on a charge of heresy and three Roman Catholic priests, Thomas Abel, Richard Fetherstone and Edward Powell, are hanged, drawn and quartered on a charge of high treason.
- August 15 – In Peru, Spanish captain Garcí Manuel de Carbajal founds the Villa Hermosa de Arequipa; one year later, Charles V of Germany and I of Spain will give the valley a status of 'city' by royal decree.
- September 3 – Gelawdewos succeeds his father Lebna Dengel as Emperor of Ethiopia.
- September 10 – Gibraltar is sacked by the fleet of Barbary pirate Ali Hamet, a Sardinian renegade in the service of the Ottoman Empire, and many of its leading citizens are taken as captives to Peñón de Vélez de la Gomera in Morocco. This leads to construction of the defensive Charles V Wall, at this time known as the Muralla de San Benito.
- September 27 – The Society of Jesus (Jesuits) is approved by Pope Paul III, in his bull Regimini militantis Ecclesiae.

=== October–December ===
- October 1 – Battle of Alborán: A Habsburg Spanish fleet, under the command of Bernardino de Mendoza, destroys an Ottoman fleet commanded by Ali Hamet off Alborán Island in the Mediterranean.
- October 18 – An expedition led by Spanish conquistador Hernando de Soto destroys the fortified village of Mabila in modern-day Alabama, killing paramount chief Tuskaloosa.
- November 8 – William Whorwood becomes the new Attorney General for England and Wales, succeeding Sir John Baker
- December 16 – Honoré I, Lord of Monaco reaches the age of 19 and after the future principality of Monaco had been administered by regents for more than 18 years.
- December 20 – Stephen V, Prince of Moldavia, is assassinated by two of the Moldavian nobles (boyars), Mihul and Trotsanul, after word arrives that he will be replaced by Petru Rareş, who had paid a bribe to the Ottoman Sultan Suleiman in order to be appointed the new Prince. Alexandru Cornea is crowned temporarily as Prince Alexandru III.
- December 31 – Estêvão da Gama, Governor of Portuguese India, departs from Goa with a plan to sail into the Red Sea, and destroy the Ottoman Empire's access to the Indian Ocean by plundering Suez. The planned attack fails.

=== Date unknown ===
- Europe is hit by a heat wave and drought lasting for about seven months. Rivers such as the Rhine and Seine dry up, and many people die from dysentery and other illnesses, caused by lack of safe drinking water.
- Georg Joachim Rheticus publishes De libris revolutionum Copernici narratio prima in Danzig, an abstract of Copernicus' as yet unpublished De revolutionibus orbium coelestium.
- Martin Luther expels theologian Caspar Schwenckfeld from Silesia.
- approximate date – The musket is introduced into Japan from Europe.

== Births ==
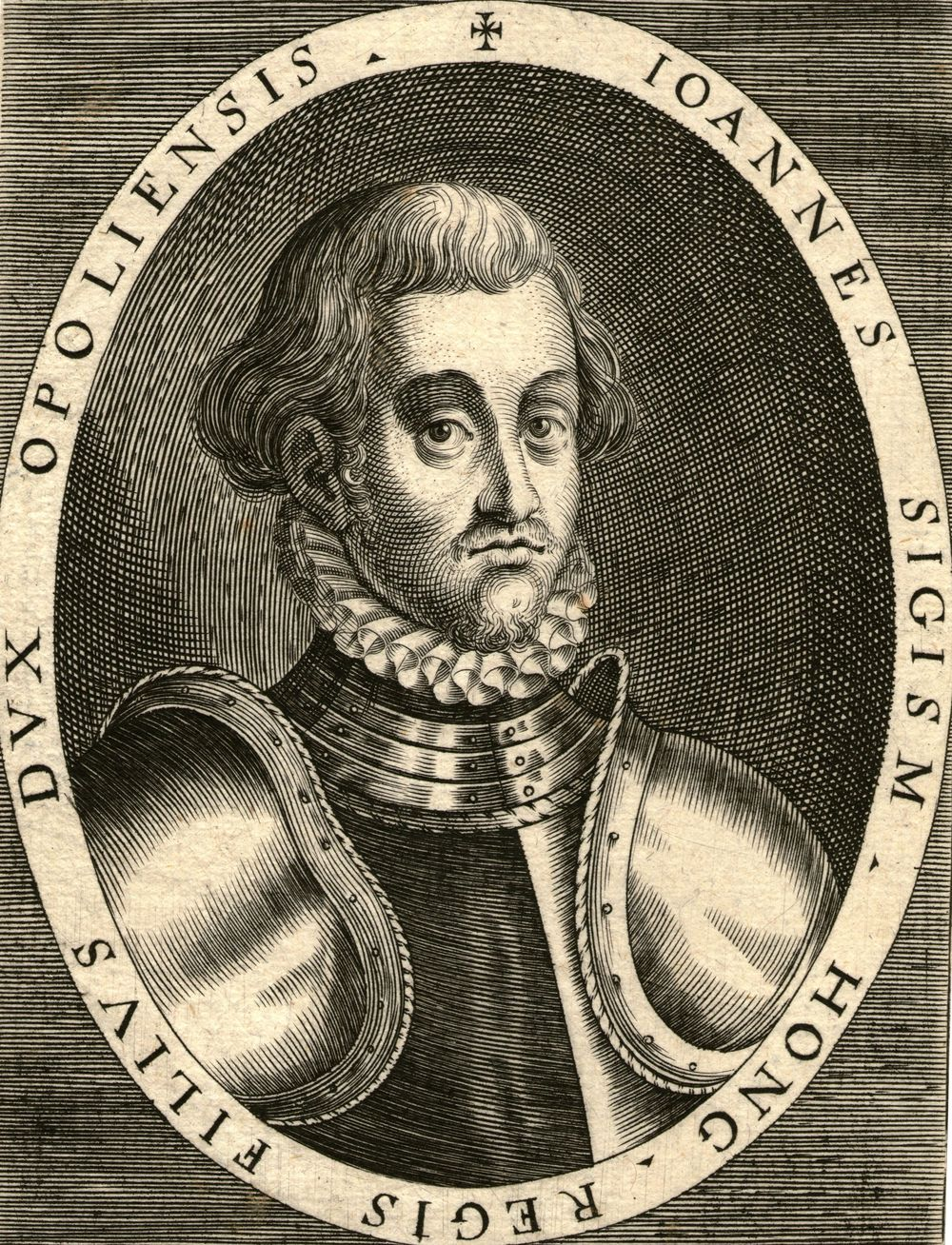
John Sigismund Zápolya

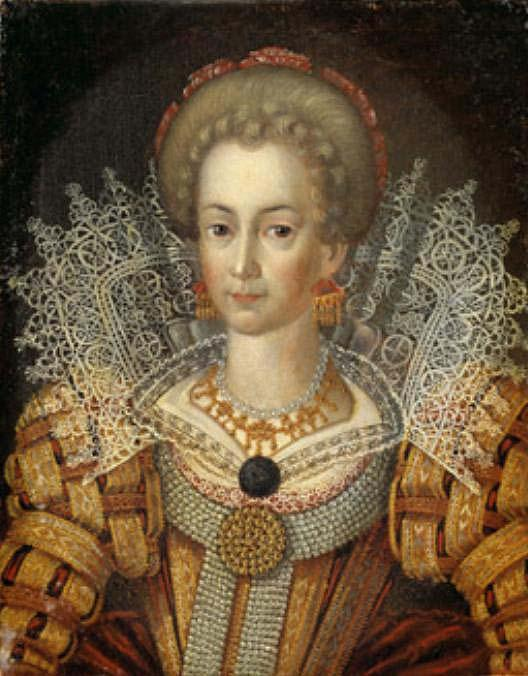
Princess Cecilia of Sweden

- January 18 – Catarina of Portugal, Duchess of Braganza, claimant to the Portuguese throne in 1580 (d. 1614)
- January 25 – Edmund Campion, English Jesuit and Roman Catholic martyr (d. 1581)
- January 28 – Ludolph van Ceulen, German mathematician (d. 1610)
- February 12 – Wŏn Kyun, Korean general and admiral during the Joseon Dynasty (d. 1597)
- February 23 – Hedwig of Brandenburg, Duchess of Brunswick-Wolfenbüttel (d. 1602)
- February 25 – Henry Howard, 1st Earl of Northampton, English aristocrat and courtier (d. 1614)
- March 1 – Enrique de Guzmán, 2nd Count of Olivares, Spanish noble (d. 1607)
- March 17 – Bernhard VII, Prince of Anhalt-Zerbst, German prince of the House of Ascania (d. 1570)
- April 3 – Maria de' Medici, Italian noble (d. 1557)
- April 8 – Toyotomi Hidenaga, Japanese warlord (d. 1591)
- May 9 – Maharana Pratap, Indian warrior king (d. 1597)
- May 14
  - Paolo Paruta, Italian historian (d. 1598)
  - Bartholomäus Scultetus, German mayor of Görlitz, astronomer (d. 1614)
- May 22 – James, Duke of Rothesay, Scottish prince (d. 1541)
- May 31 – Henry Cheyne, 1st Baron Cheyne, English politician and baron (d. 1587)
- June 3 – Charles II, Archduke of Austria, regent of Inner Austria (d. 1590)
- June 9 – Shima Sakon, Japanese samurai (d. 1600)
- June 11 – Barnabe Googe, English poet (d. 1594)
- June 29 – Ana de Mendoza y de Silva, Princess of Éboli, Spanish countess (d. 1592)
- June 30 – Countess Palatine Elisabeth of Simmern-Sponheim, Duchess of Saxony (d. 1594)
- July 7 – John Sigismund Zápolya, King of Hungary (d. 1571)
- July 11 – Adolf of Nassau, Count of Nassau, Dutch soldier (d. 1568)
- July 16 – Alfonso Carafa, Italian cardinal (d. 1565)
- July 19 – Ludowika Margaretha of Zweibrücken-Bitsch, spouse of Count Philip V of Hanau-Lichtenberg (d. 1569)
- August 4 – Sisto Fabri, Italian theologian (d. 1594)
- August 5 – Joseph Justus Scaliger, French Protestant scholar (d. 1609)
- August 25 – Lady Catherine Grey, English noblewoman, potential successor to the throne (d. 1568)
- September 5 – Magnus, Duke of Holstein, Prince of Denmark (d. 1583)
- September 9 – John VII, Count of Oldenburg (d. 1603)
- October 1 – Johann Jakob Grynaeus, Swiss Protestant clergyman (d. 1617)
- November 12 – Anna of Veldenz, Margrave of Baden (d. 1586)
- November 16 – Princess Cecilia of Sweden (d. 1627)
- December 8 – Giovanni Vincenzo Gonzaga, Italian Catholic cardinal (d. 1591)
- December 21 – Thomas Schweicker, German artist (d. 1602)
- December 28 – Charles I, Duke of Mecklenburg (d. 1610)
- December 31 – Silvio Antoniano, Italian Catholic cardinal (d. 1603)
- date unknown
  - Andrea Andreani, Italian wood engraver (d. 1623)
  - Inés de Hinojosa, Venezuelan hacendada (d. 1571)
  - Francis Drake, English sea captain, privateer, navigator, slaver, pirate and politician (d. 1596)
  - Christopher Hatton, English politician (d. 1591)
  - George Hastings, 4th Earl of Huntingdon, English nobleman (d. 1604)
  - Pierre Jeannin, French statesman (d. 1622)
  - François Viète, French mathematician (d. 1603)
  - Amago Yoshihisa, Japanese samurai and warlord (d. 1610)
- probable
  - William Byrd, English composer (d. 1623)
  - Bernardino de Mendoza, Spanish military commander (d. 1604)
  - Paschal Baylon, Spanish friar (d. 1592)

== Deaths ==
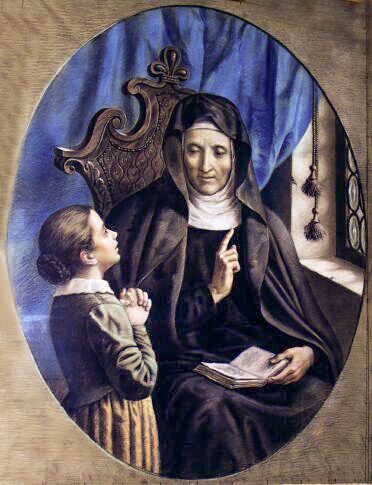
Angela Merici

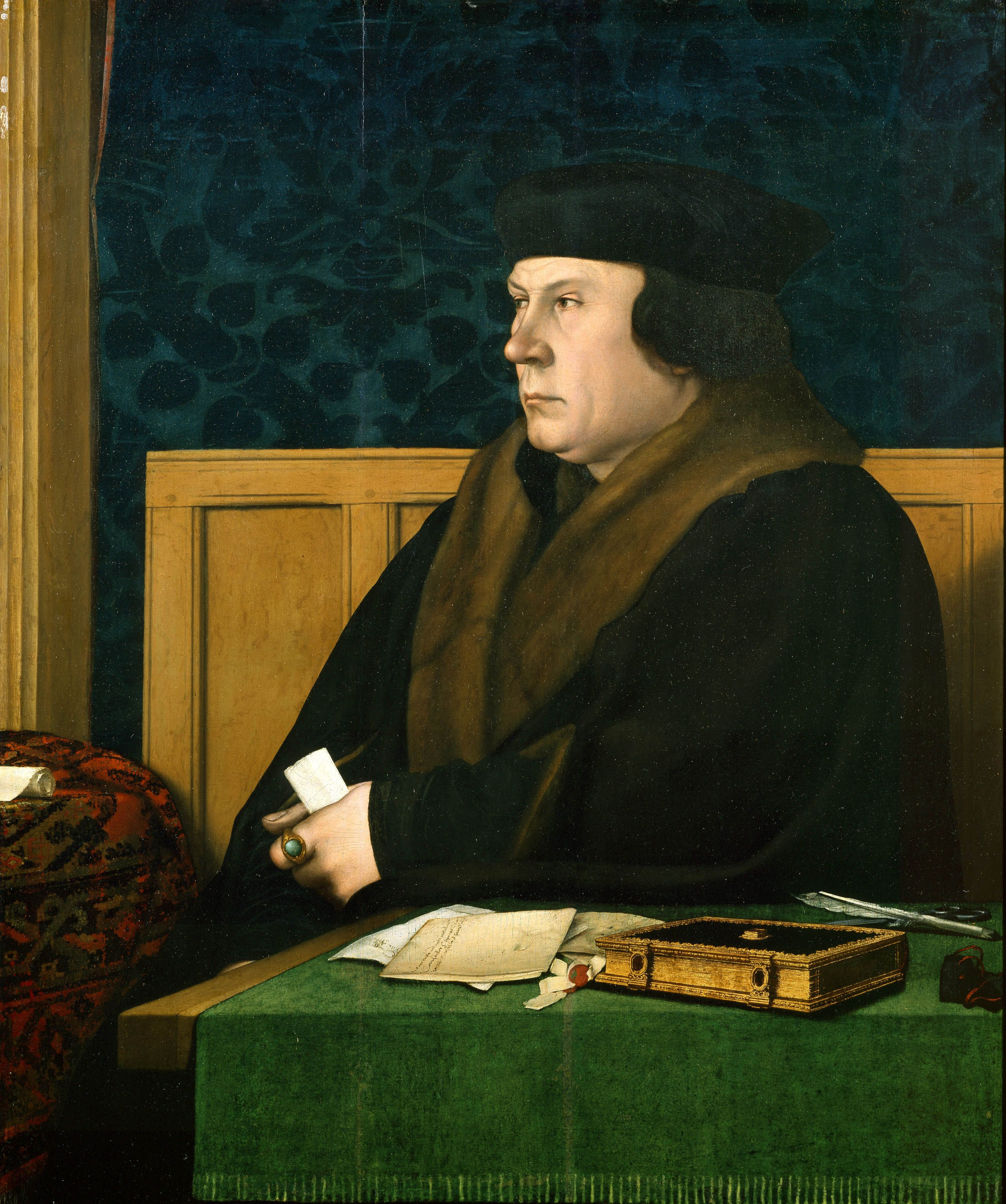
Thomas Cromwell

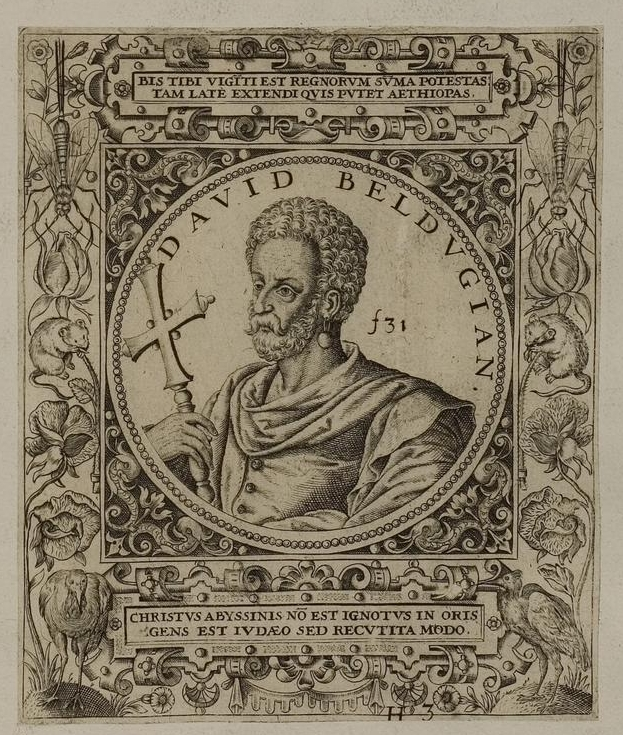
Lebna Dengel

- c. January – Elizabeth Blount, mistress of Henry VIII of England (b. 1502)
- January 27 – Angela Merici, Italian religious leader and saint (b. 1474)
- March 30 – Matthäus Lang von Wellenburg, German statesman and archbishop of Salzburg (b. 1469)
- April 21 – Cardinal-Infante Afonso of Portugal, Catholic cardinal (b. 1509)
- May 6 – Juan Luís Vives, Spanish scholar (b. 1492)
- May 22 – Francesco Guicciardini, Italian statesman and historian (b. 1483)
- June 16 – Konrad von Thüngen, German noble (b. c. 1466)
- July 22 – John Zápolya, King of Hungary (b. c. 1490)
- July 28 – Thomas Cromwell, 1st Earl of Essex, English statesman (executed) (b. c.1485)
- July 30
  - Thomas Abel, English priest (martyred) (b. c. 1497)
  - Robert Barnes, English reformer (martyred) (b. 1495)
  - Eric I, Duke of Brunswick-Lüneburg, Prince of Calenberg (1491–1540) (b. 1470)
- August 23 – Guillaume Budé, French scholar (b. 1467)
- August 24 – Girolamo Francesco Maria Mazzola (Parmigianino), Italian artist (b. 1503)
- August 28 – Federico II Gonzaga, Duke of Mantua (b. 1500)
- September 2 – Lebna Dengel, Emperor of Ethiopia (in battle) (b. 1501)
- September 16 – Enrique de Borja y Aragón, Spanish noble of the House of Borgia (b. 1518)
- September 20 – Infante Duarte, Duke of Guimarães, son of King Manuel I of Portugal (b. 1515)
- October 5 – Helius Eobanus Hessus, German Latin poet (b. 1488)
- date unknown – Francisco de Ulloa, Spanish explorer
- probable
  - Tristão da Cunha, Portuguese explorer (b. 1460)
  - Johann Georg Faust, German alchemist (b. 1480)
