= Gültekin =

Gültekin is a Turkish given name for males and a surname. It may refer to:

== Given name ==
- Gültekin Kaan (born Gültekin Kaan Kaynak), Turkish German musician and singer
- Gültekin Uysal (born 1976), Turkish politician and businessman

== Surname ==
- Fatma Songül Gültekin (born 1997), Turkish female hockey player and former footballer
- Hasret Gültekin (1971–1993), Turkish Alevi musician and poet
- Nurgül Gültekin (born 1976), Turkish stage and film actress; stage name: Nurgül Yeşilçay
- Yusuf Emre Gültekin (born 1993), Turkish football player
- Aron Can (born 1999), Icelandic rapper and musician
