= Song Wan =

Song Wan may refer to:

- Song Wan (Water Margin), Water Margin character
- Song Wan (poet), early Qing poet
