= Johannes Magirus the elder =

Johannes Magirus
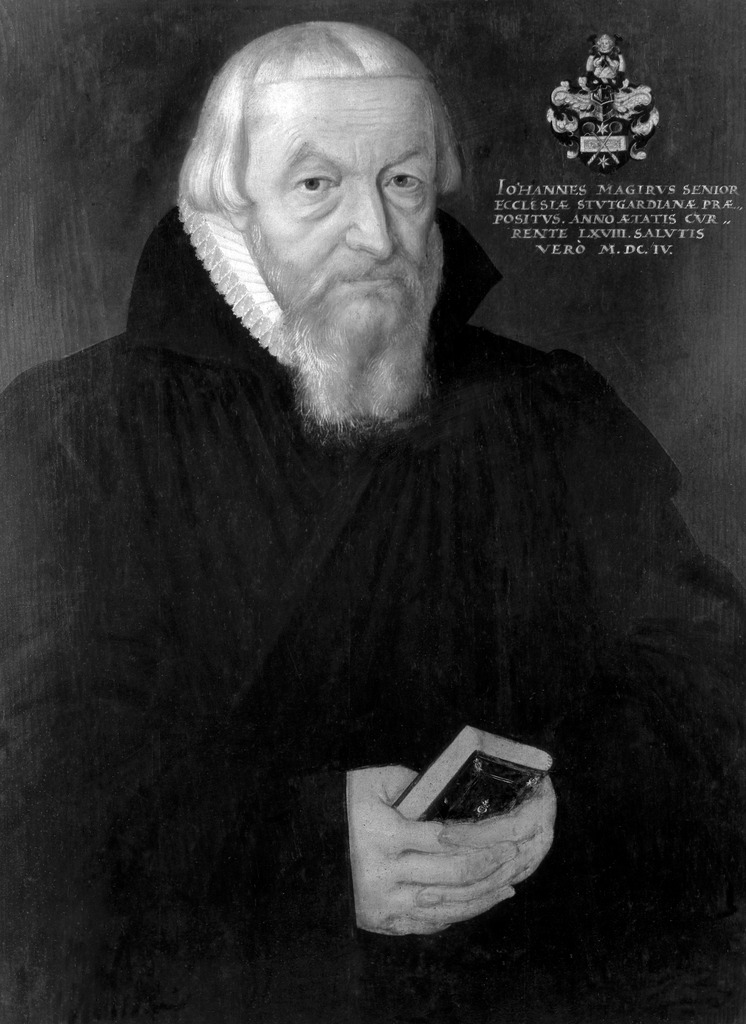
- Johannes Magirus (Oil painting by Gabriel Karg, 1604 Tübinger Professorengalerie)
- Born: Johannes Koch; 26 March 1537; Backnang, Württemberg
- Died: 4 July 1614 (aged 77); Cannstatt, Württemberg
- Occupations: Theological Scholar; Abbot; Church leader
- Spouse(s): Anna Fritz (ca. 1559) Veronika Grafegg (ca. 1588)
- Children: ca. 10 including Johannes Magirus the younger (1560-1626)

Johannes Magirus (26 March 1537 – 4 July 1614) was a German Lutheran Theologian.

== Name change ==
His name at birth, like that of his father, was Johannes Koch. The English language equivalent would be "John Cook". At some point he renamed himself "Johannes Magirus", reflecting an enthusiasm for classical culture that was common among many intellectuals of his time and place. Magirus ("Μάγειρας") is the Greek word for "cook."

== Life ==
Johannes Koch was born in Backnang in Württemberg. He lost his father, the carpenter Johannes Koch through a fatal accident around 1540, and underwent an impoverished upbringing, supporting his mother Magdalena (born Magdalena Kurtz). As a boy he excelled at scholarship, especially in his study of Latin, raising concern on the part of a step father that he might be taken to Spain by Spanish soldiers of the Imperial army who were in Backnang in connection with the Schmalkaldic War between December 1546 and December 1549. He was removed from school and apprenticed in a craft trade for more than a year in order to divert attention from his academic prowess, but by 1553, at the unusually youthful age of just 16, he was studying Theology with a scholarship to the University of Tübingen. Continuing in his scholarly precocity, he became a Bachelor of Arts at the age of 18 and a Master of Arts at 20. In order to supplement his stipendium and fund his book buying habit, he was also operating as a wine dealer at this time. Two years later, in 1559, he obtained a post in Stuttgart as a deacon, becoming a deacon for the surrounding villages in 1561.

Shortly afterwards ill health forced him to leave the city, and in 1562 he took up a diaconat at Vaihingen an der Enz, in the rural region to the west of Stuttgart. In 1567 he was appointed prelate (superintendent) and abbot at Maulbronn Monastery, which the Duke of Württemberg had refounded eleven years before as a Lutheran brotherhood. On 25 October 1578, still aged only 41, he was appointed Provost of Stuttgart's Collegiate Church in succession to Wilhelm Bidenbach, which was the highest ecclesiastical office in Württemberg. He held office till his death 36 years later, widely commended as a true pastor, good preacher, able businessman and insightful theologian. Along with his sermons, he published numerous pamphlets rebutting Catholic and Calvinist theological positions.

== Death ==
During his final years Magirus was greatly troubled by "internal stones" ("Steinbeschwerden"), and he died at nearby Cannstatt where he had gone to seek relief from his illness. His body was taken home and buried in Stuttgart at the Collegiate Church, however.

== Family ==
Johannes Magirus was twice married. By his first marriage, with Anna Fritz, seven recorded children were born, including Johannes Magirus the younger (1560-1626), like his father remembered as a Lutheran Theologian, Jakob Magirus (1564–1624) who became the abbot of Lorch and David Magirus (1566–1635) who became a Professor at Tübingen.

His second marriage, to Veronika Grafegg, took place around 1588, and there were more children. It is recorded that most of his children either became or else married ministers of religion. A remoter descendant, Conrad Dietrich Magirus, founded in 1866 a business to manufacture fire fighting equipment which grew to become, during the first half of the twentieth century, one of Germany's leading truck producers.
