= Oberbrüden =

- Ortsteil of Auenwald
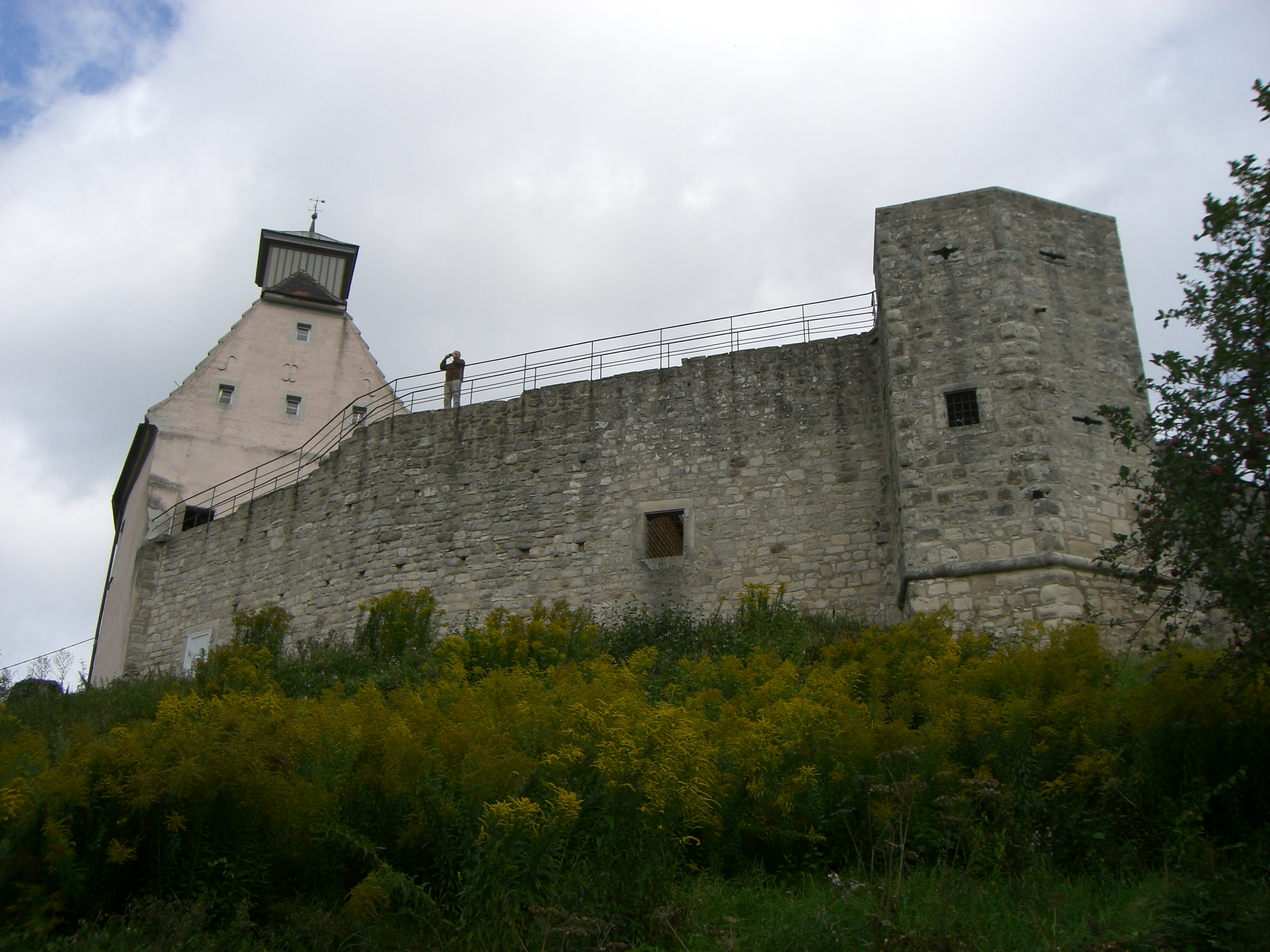
- Ebersberg Castle

- Coat of arms
- Interactive map of Oberbrüden
- Location within Germany Location within Baden-Württemberg
- Coordinates: 48°56′13″N 09°30′03″E
- Country: Germany
- State: Baden-Württemberg
- Admin. region: Stuttgart
- District: Rems-Murr-Kreis
- Municipality: Auenwald
- Elevation: 288 m (945 ft)
- Time zone: UTC+01:00 (CET)
  - Summer (DST): UTC+02:00 (CEST)

Oberbrüden is a village in the district of Rems-Murr-Kreis in Baden-Württemberg in Germany. It is 3 mi (4.8 km) east of the town Backnang and about 15 mi (24 km) from the state capital Stuttgart. Population is about 2000 people. Together with the villages Unterbrüden, Ebersberg and Lippoldsweiler, Oberbrüden is part of the municipality Auenwald. In 2014 a 2000 year old Roman sunken lane between Steinbach and Oberbrüden was restored.
