= Gabriel Karg =

German painter

Gabriel Karg (in or before 1570 – between 1630 and 1640) was a Swabian artist who spent his career in Swabia and Württemberg. The son of a Stuttgart court painter, he is known for portraits of establishment figures of his time and place.

== Life ==
Gabriel Karg was born in Augsburg at a time when the city was still part of Swabia, the son of Hans Karg by his marriage to Sabina Gucker. It was probably in 1591 that Karg relocated to Stuttgart where his father had been a court painter since 1588 and was working in the new de:Neues Lusthaus StuttgartLusthaus(theatre and recreation centre), in which Gabriel joined him. Later he became a painter, probably sticking exclusively to portraits (unlike his father). In 1594 he produced an oil painting, probably of Johann Magirus, which formed the basis for another very similar painting of Johann Magirus that he painted in 1604, and which carried the signature "G. Karg". In search of further wealthy clients for a portraitist he then moved to Tübingen, where in 1601 he became registered as one of the "illuminista". However, there was considerable competition between portrait painters in Tübingen, by 1607 he had moved back to Augsburg.

From his time in Württemberg six portraits survived till the twentieth century. Two of these are part of the extensive collection at the Professors' Gallery ("Professorengalerie") at the University of Tübingen.

== Gabriel Karg: known portraits ==
- 1594 Johannes Magirus (oil painting)
- 1600 Daniel Schrötlin (oil painting, signed by "G.K.", destroyed 1944)
- 1600 Mrs. Schrötlin (oil painting, signed by "G.K.", destroyed 1944)
- 1601 Johann Theodor Schnepf, Minister of Derendingen (oil painting, signed by "G.K.")
- 1601 Prof. David Magirus (1566–1635, lawyer) (oil painting, signed by "G.K.", now at the Professors' Gallery)
- 1604 Johannes Magirus (oil painting, now at the Professors' Gallery)
