= Ursula Sax =

German visual artist and sculptor

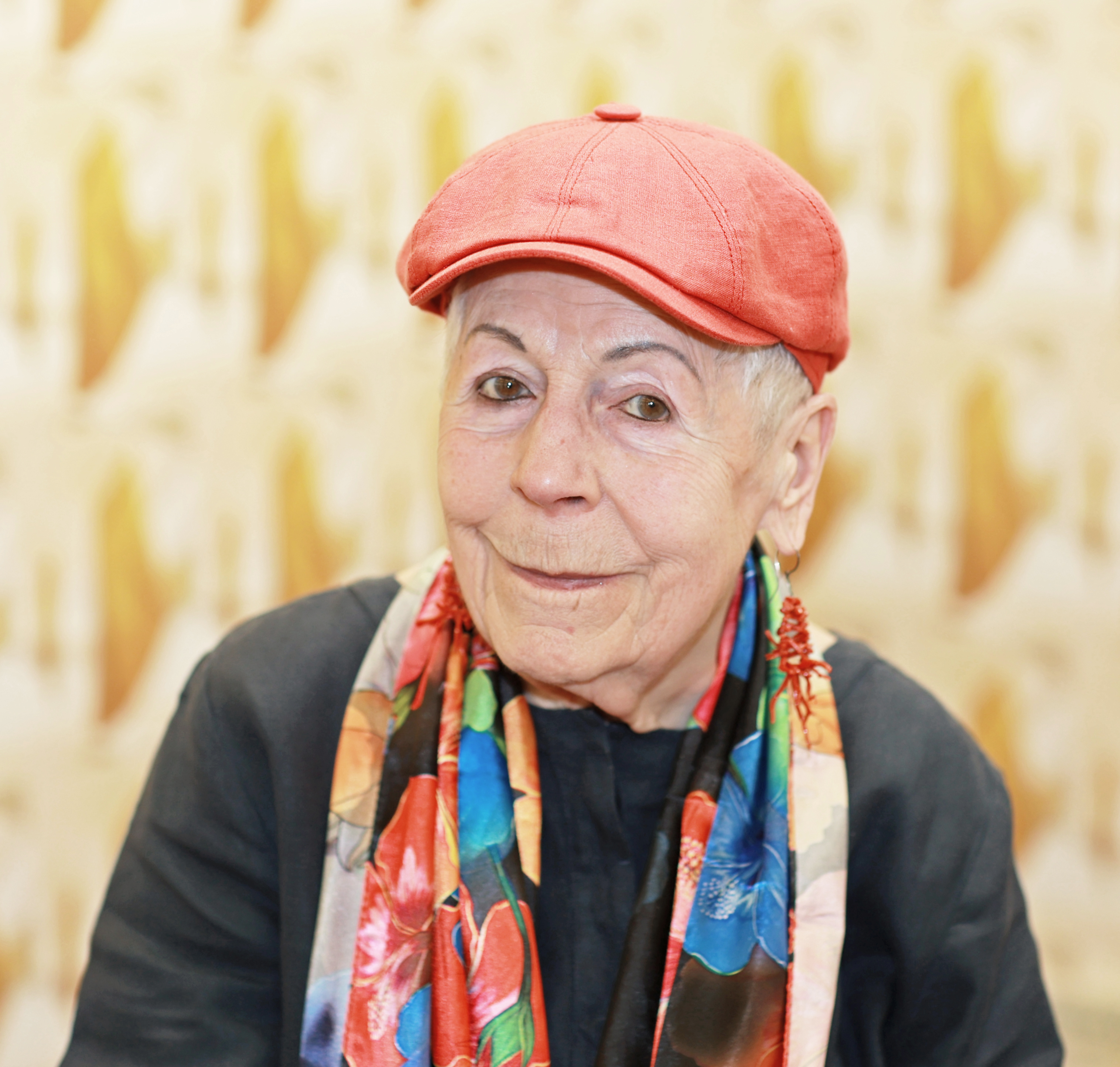
Ursula Sax in 2023, by Elena Ternovaja

Ursula Sax (born 1935 in Backnang/Württemberg) is a German visual artist and sculptor.

== Life ==
Ursula Sax was born in Backnang, a lively small town near Stuttgart. She has described her father as a teacher with artistic-poetic ambitions. He refused to go along with the political spirit of the age and in small-town Germany during the 1930s and 1940s his elder daughter acquired from her father the habit – which has never left her – of thinking herself an outsider. Still aged just 15, she enrolled at the State Academy of Fine Arts ("Staatliche Akademie der Bildenden Künste") in Stuttgart where she studied sculpture between 1950 and 1955, before moving to West Berlin where for the next five years she studied at the Berlin University of the Arts as a "Meisterschülerin" (special higher-level student) of Hans Uhlmann. She later implied during an interview that her most influential teacher, while she was still at Stuttgart, was Willi Baumeister: "He has been in my head ever since".

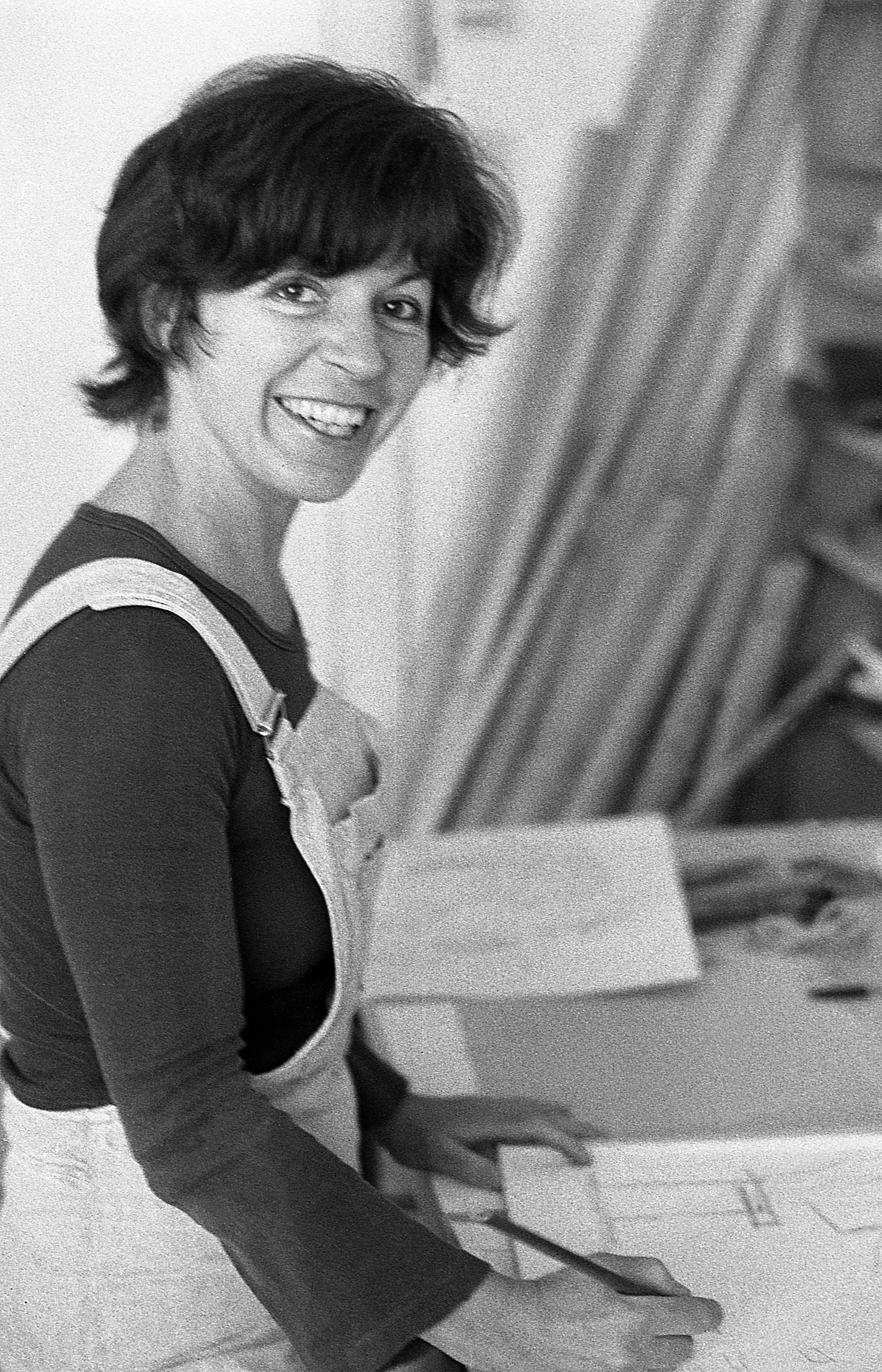
Ursula Sax Dietmar Bührer, 1974

In 1960, she launched herself as a freelance artist in Berlin, constantly experimenting with new materials and forms. There was no instant breakthrough moment, and for some years her professional progress was steady rather than spectacular. Nevertheless, from 1960 she was able to win an annual travel bursary from the Berlin "Kultursenat" for Greece and another sponsorship grant from the Arts Circle of the Federation of German Industries ("Bundesverband der Deutschen Industrie").

During 1985/86 and again in 1989 Sax accepted a guest professorship at the Hochschule der Künste (Arts Academy) in West Berlin. She then, in 1990, accepted a full professorship at the Hochschule für Bildende Künst (Visual Arts Academy) in Braunschweig, remaining there till 1993. From Braunschweig she moved on to Dresden where she was employed as a professor from 1993 till 2000 at the Academy of Fine Arts which, prior to her arrival, according to one commentator, was a bastion of Soviet-style "organically contemplated figuration in sculpture and the plastic arts". In the wake of reunification, taste in art in the so-called "neue Bundesländer" (former) East Germany) was no longer a matter to be determined by party leaders and officials. Sax was instrumental in driving a complete reorientation of approach during her seven years at Dresden.

On reaching 65 Sax retired from her academic post and returned to her life as a freelance artist, in 2004 settling in Radebeul, a wine (and tourist) town in the hill country down-river of Dresden, with a lively and long-standing tradition as a home to artists. During the next few years she held several solo exhibitions, both in Dresden and in Berlin. She relocated again at the start of 2013, this time back to Berlin.

== Works ==
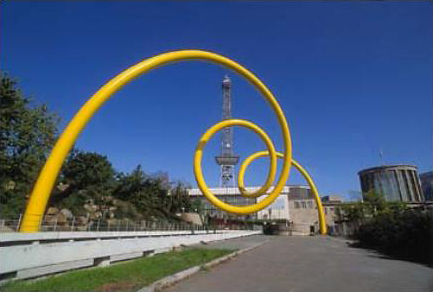
Looping Ursula Sax, 1992

The work of Ursula Sax is multi-faceted, but can be sorted into a succession of (often overlapping) time periods, each lasting several years, and each characterised by a certain – often unconventional – material or selection of materials.

Her earliest serious works are in clay, principally retaining the organoid "raw" form of the material, combining the inherent nature of it with the artist's technical input. In an early phase, from 1954 till about 1962, there were many sculpted forms from tree trunks, each organised around an axis deriving from the form of the timber. From 1957 till 1960, along with timber, she was working extensively in iron. Through the 1970s she concentrated on sculptures and interior constructions using preformed timber elements such as boards and beams, with a frequent preference for simple soft pine timber. Between 1991 and 1996 Sax produced a succession of "wind sculptures" and flag, using fabrics in combination with colourful so-called "wind clothes" and "air clothes" to cloth female bodies for a "geometric ballet" presentation, evincing a shameless spirit of freedom to be true to oneself, of optimism and good cheer, in ways that two decades later, in a more sombre age, can be construed as almost indelicately cheerful or frivolous, although there is no reason to impute any sort of conscious political intent at the time to the artist. They were generally presented in public places where they readily drew the eye, or in theatres in the context of avant-garde stage shows.

From the very start, Sax's artistic approach has been defined in part by an interest in sculptural aspects and related aspects of sculptural-spatial themes, along with express relationships to the relevant architectural spaces. Through the years she created a number of major sculptural pieces for public spaces. One of these is "Looping" beside the Berlin exhibition ground ("Berlin Messegelände"). Described by one commentator as "a 120 meter long yellow steel sculpture, winding round its own axis like a dancing dragon", its authorship is not as widely known as much as might be expected. This reflects an element of reticence on the part of its creator. Ursula Sax is much more interested in producing her art work than in sitting down with interviewers or supporting a personal public relations support network.

== Membership ==
Between 1966 and 1996 Ursula Sax was an active member of the Deutscher Künstlerbund ("Association of German Artists"). During those three decades she took part in no fewer than twelve of the association's annual exhibitions.

== Awards (selection) ==
- 1960: Travel bursary from the Berlin "Kultursenat" for Greece
- 1960: Bursary from the Arts Circle of the BDI
- 1963: Villa Romana Prize
- 1974: Will Grohmann Prize
- 1976: Villa Massimo Stipendium
- 1977: Bremen Art Prize
- 1979: Cité internationale des arts (Paris) residency
- 1980: Hand-Hollow, USA
- 1998: Honoured guest at the Villa Massimo (Rome)
- 2017: Regional Arts Prize of the Capital City (Dresden)

== Sister ==
The younger sister of Ursula Sax, Uta Sax, has achieved some notability as an actress, principally on TV.
