= Gültekin Kaan =

Turkish singer

- Born: Gültekin Kaynak; Backnang, Germany
- Origin: Turkey
- Genres: Anatolian rock World music Rock; Progressive rock Hard rock Psychedelic rock Alternative rock Pop rock
- Instruments: Vocal, guitar
- Years active: 1998-present
- Labels: Blue Flame, Rough Trade Records, We Play, Sony, Odeon
- Website: www.gultekinkaan.com

Gültekin Kaan is a Turkish German musician and singer born in Backnang and raised in Remscheid Germany. He merges Western pop culture with elements of Turkish art and folk music. He performs with his own band under the name Gültekin Kaan & diVan.

Kaan's lyrics in Turkish tell stories based on Turkish history and fables. He puts special focus on visual appearance by taking the role of a Turkish sultan with his court of grand viziers, pashas, emirs, belly dancers and bodyguards, dressed in Eastern robes.

Kaan released his first album in 2011 called 1001 Divan on We Play/Sony Music label in Turkey. The follow-up album was in 2012 and titled Sofra released internationally on Blue Flame/ Rough Trade label.

== Band ==
- Arnulf Ochs - guitar
- Osmo - bass
- Ingo von Wenzlavovicz - drums
- Oral Cakir - darbuka

== Discography ==
=== Albums ===
- 2011: 1001 Divan
- 2012: Sofra
