= Inés de Hinojosa =

Inés de Hinojosa (1540-1571) was a Venezuelan hacendada. Born in Barquisimeto, in the Province of Venezuela of the Spanish Empire, she was raised and first married in Carora. She was executed for a crime of passion in Tunja in 1571. Her case constituted one of the greatest scandals of the Kingdom of New Granada and Venezuela. Its history was written for the first time by Juan Rodríguez Freyle in chapter X of El Carnero where he recounted the events between 1560 and 1571. In 1864, it was rewritten by Temístocles Avella Mendoza in Los tres Pedros en la red de Inés de Hinojosa. The story was also revived in 1986 by the Colombian writer Próspero Morales Pradilla in Los pecados de Inés de Hinojosa (The Sins of Inés de Hinojosa). Best seller of the year, the novel was made into a television series (The Sins of Inés de Hinojosa) in 1988.

== Chronicle ==
Of mestizo origin, Doña Inés married in Carora with the Spaniard Pedro de Ávila, who was a drunkard, partygoer and gambler. They lived with Juanita, half sister of Inés. She established an extramarital relationship with Jorge Voto, who sold himself as a master of the customs of the Spanish court, and both planned the murder of her husband.

The couple, accompanied by Juanita, fled Carora and settled temporarily in Pamplona, where they married. Later they resided in Tunja, which was a first-rate colonial enclave that emulated Santafé in terms of the number and nobility of the Spaniards who lived there. The most important was Pedro Bravo de Rivera, the encomendero of Chivatá, who immediately noticed Inés, and they established a romance.

Jorge Voto, who was a dancer, set up a dance academy and established a branch in the capital of the kingdom. When he was absent from Tunja, he offered the opportunity for the couple's reunion. Pedro Bravo de Rivera and Doña Inés decided to plan the murder of the dancer, who was found dead one morning at the bottom of a ravine. This time the murderers were discovered and justice was served: the encomendero was condemned to be beheaded and Inés received the punishment of the gallows along with Hernán Bravo de Rivera, mestizo brother of don Pedro and accomplice in the murder of Jorge Voto. The then president of the royal audience of Santafé, Andrés Díaz Venero de Leyva, decided to travel personally to Tunja to take charge of the criminal case.
