= Francesco Vimercato =

Francesco Vimercato (1512–1571) was an Italian Aristotelian scholar. He was a Royal Reader in Philosophy in Paris. He is known for his commentaries on Aristotle’s ethical and zoological works.

In 1561 he left France to work for Emmanuel Philibert, Duke of Savoy. He was employed as a professor, and then a diplomat.
