= Murakoshi Naoyoshi =

Japanese samurai

Murakoshi Naoyoshi (村越 直吉, 1562 - February 23, 1614) was a Japanese samurai of the Azuchi-Momoyama period through early Edo period, who served the Tokugawa clan. He died in 1614.
