= Johannes Magirus =

German physician and natural philosopher

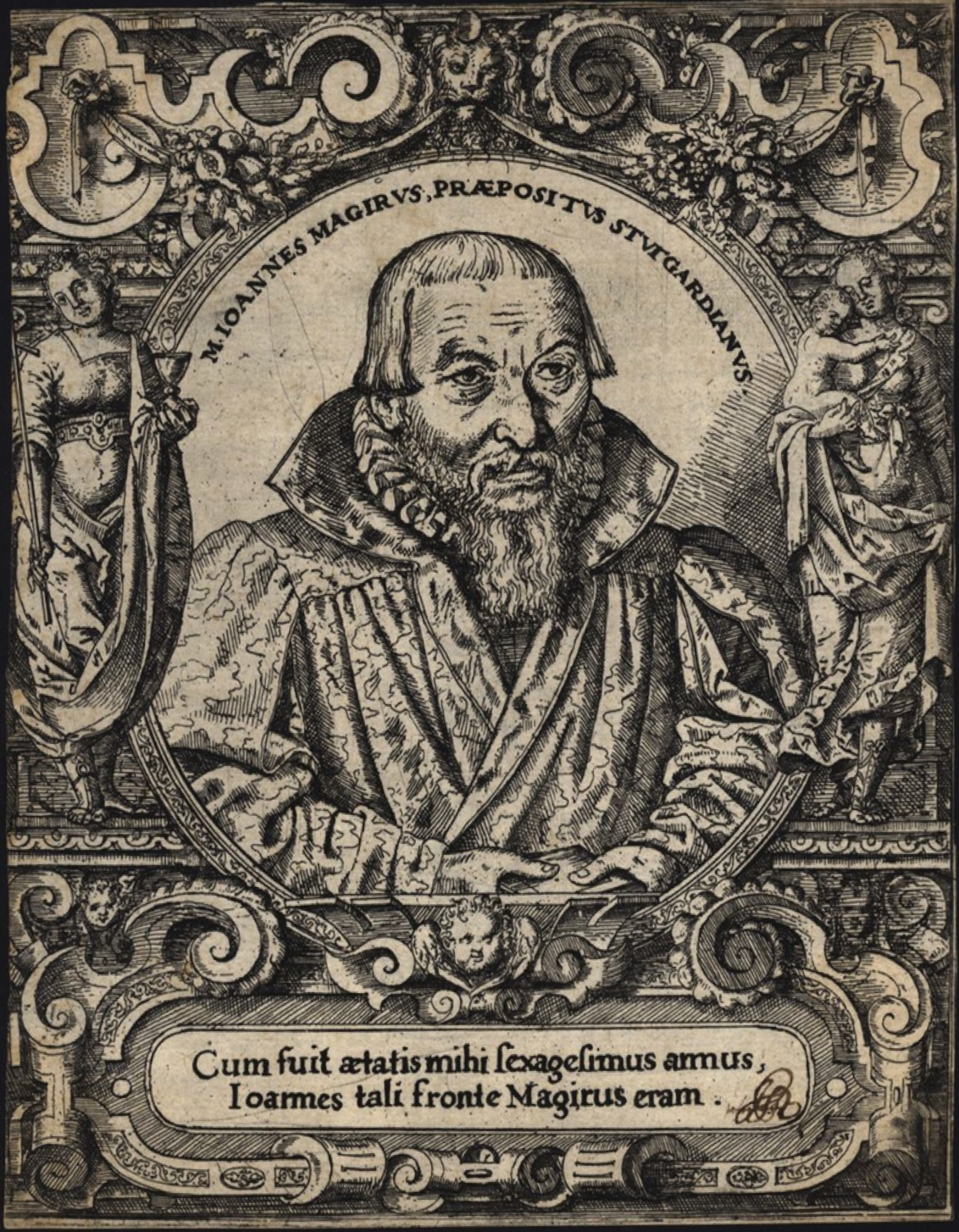
Johannes Magirus (c. 1590)

Johannes Magirus (c. 1560 – 1596) was a German physician and natural philosopher. He was born at Fritzlar about 1560; his background was Lutheran. He studied at the University of Padua under the Italian philosopher Jacopo Zabarella, and took a medical degree at the University of Marburg in 1585.

== Works ==
- Physiologiae Peripateticae libri sex (1597: published posthumously). This was a textbook treatment of Aristotelian philosophy. It drew on the works of Hermolao Barbaro, Gasparo Contarini, Thomas Erastus, Philipp Melanchthon, Arcangelus Mercenarius, Francesco Patrizzi, Julius Caesar Scaliger, Jakob Schegk, Johannes Velcurio, Francesco Vimercato, and Jacopo Zabarella.

The text was still in use 50 years later. It was employed to teach physics in the early years of Harvard College, and Isaac Newton was introduced to natural philosophy through this work of Magirus and the work of the German philosopher Daniel Stahl.
