= Backnang =

- Town
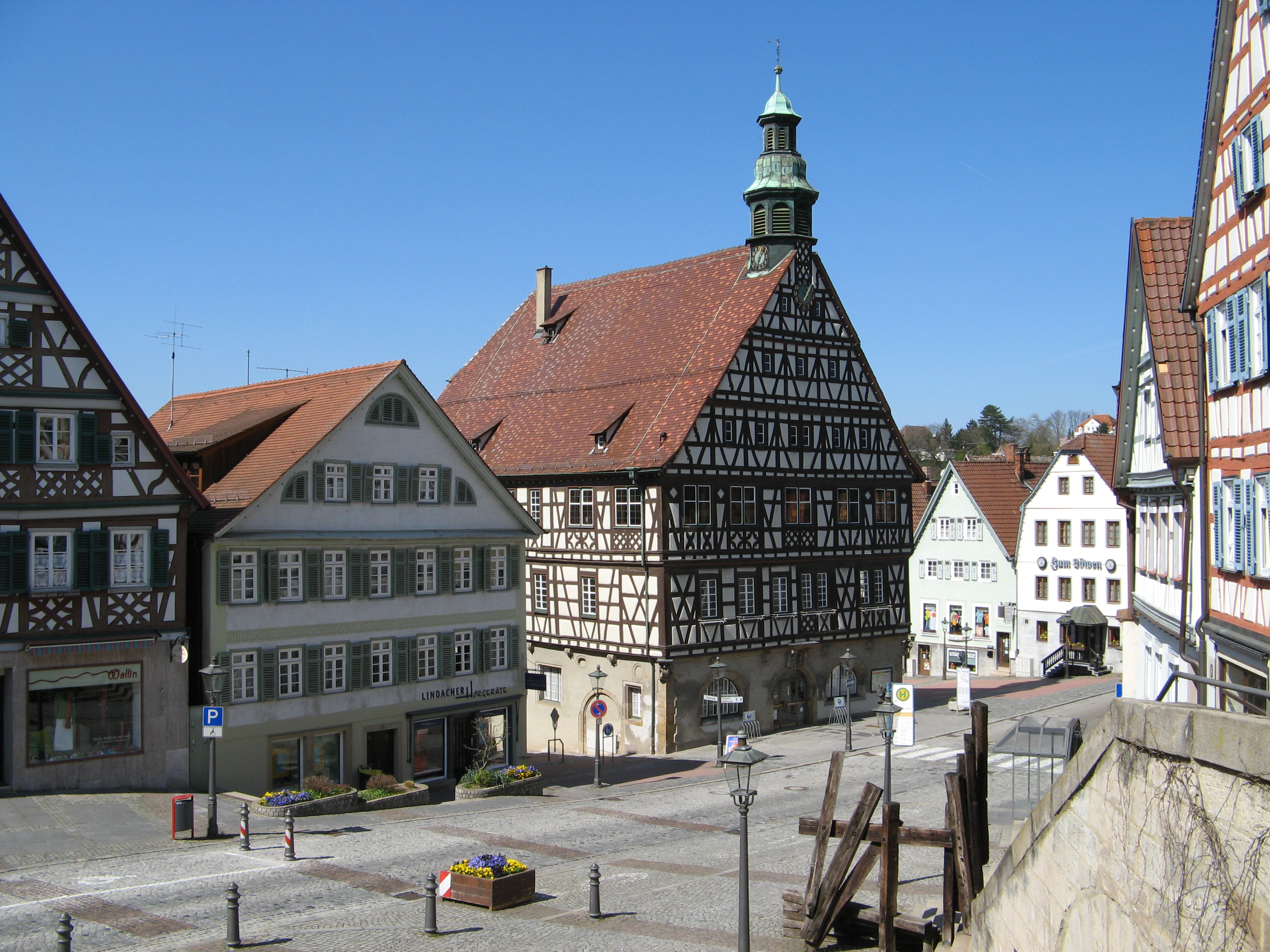

- Coat of arms

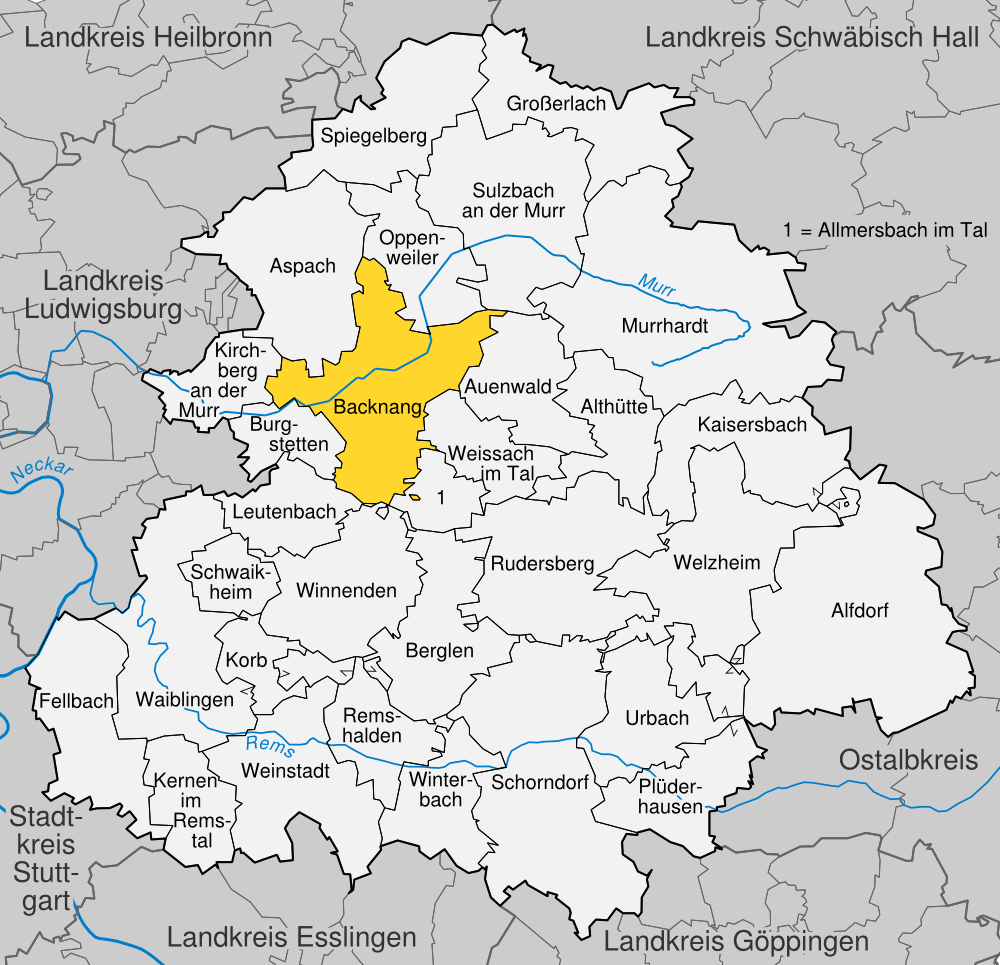
- Location of Backnang within Rems-Murr-Kreis district
- Interactive map of Backnang
- Location within Germany Location within Baden-Württemberg
- Coordinates: 48°56′47″N 09°25′50″E
- Country: Germany
- State: Baden-Württemberg
- Admin. region: Stuttgart
- District: Rems-Murr-Kreis
- Subdivisions: Kernstadt und 5 Stadtteile

Government
  - Mayor (2021–29): Maximilian Friedrich (Ind.)

Area
  - Total: 39.38 km^{2} (15.20 sq mi)
- Elevation: 271 m (889 ft)

Population (2025-12-31)
  - Total: 38,615
  - Density: 980.6/km^{2} (2,540/sq mi)
- Time zone: UTC+01:00 (CET)
  - Summer (DST): UTC+02:00 (CEST)
- Postal codes: 71501–71522
- Dialling codes: 07191
- Vehicle registration: WN, BK
- Website: www.backnang.de

Backnang (German pronunciation: [ˈbaknaŋ]; Swabian: Baggana) is a town in Germany in the Bundesland of Baden-Württemberg, roughly 30 km (19 mi) northeast of Stuttgart. Its population has increased greatly over the past century, from 7,650 in 1900 to 37,957 in 2022.

Backnang was ceded to Württemberg by the Baden (Zähringer family) in 1325. Backnang has been known as Gerberstadt due to several tanneries and leather factories, and wool and cloth mills that dominated Backnang's industries. Today, all of these have vanished, and instead, telecommunication companies, such as Ericsson (formerly AEG, Telefunken, ANT Nachrichtentechnik, Bosch and Marconi) and Tesat-Spacecom, dominate the town's industries. The Stiftskirche, formerly the church of Backnang Abbey, dates back to the 12th century.

Backnang hosts the annual Strassenfest during the last weekend in June where the monday is also in June. It has been founded as a street festival where local sports and cultural clubs offered drinks and foods. The traditional opening of the Strassenfest is marked with cannon shots from the city tower at 6 pm on Friday and ends with the Zapfenstreich on the following Monday at 11 pm. The Strassenfest typically attracts more than 100,000 spectators.

== Population ==
Historical population
Year	Pop.	±%
1849:	4,464	—
1871:	4,472	+0.2%
1900:	7,650	+71.1%
1925:	8,811	+15.2%
1939:	11,601	+31.7%
1946:	15,412	+32.9%
1961:	23,725	+53.9%
1975:	29,614	+24.8%
1995:	33,882	+14.4%
2010:	35,395	+4.5%

== Mayors ==
Before 1930 the title for this position was Stadtschultheiß. In 1930 the title became Bürgermeister (Mayor), and in 1956 with the elevation of Backnang to a "large district town," the title was changed to Oberbürgermeister (Lord Mayor).

- 1901–1921: Hermann Eckstein
- 1921–1945: Albert Rienhardt
- 1946–1966: Walter Baumgärtner
- 1966–1986: Martin Dietrich (1929-2012)
- 1986–1994: Hannes Rieckhoff (born 1944)
- 1994–2002: Jürgen-Heinrich Schmidt (born 1942)
- 2002-2021: Frank Nopper (born 1961)
- since 2021: Maximilian Friedrich (born 1987)

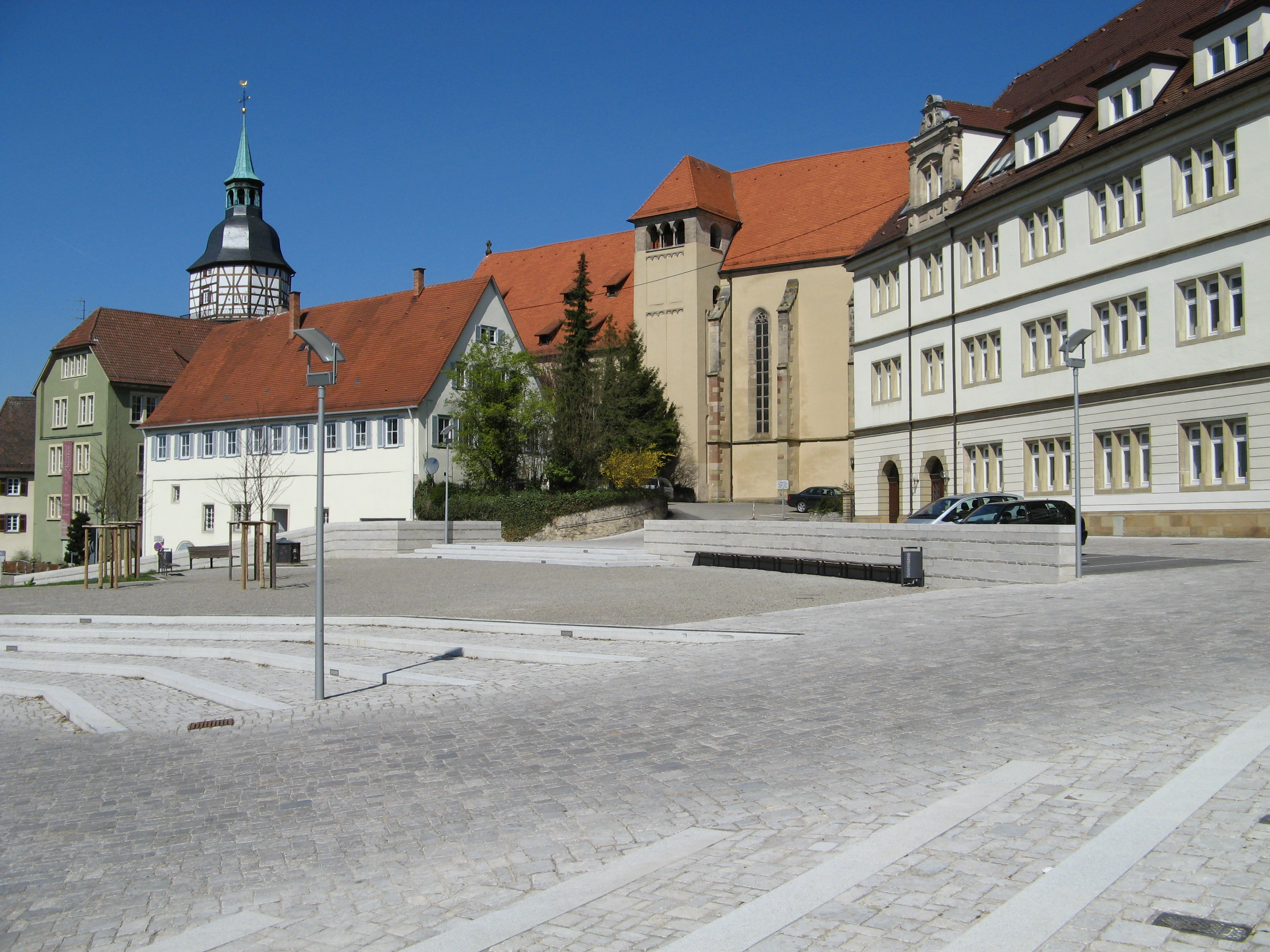
Stiftshof, the local court, on the right

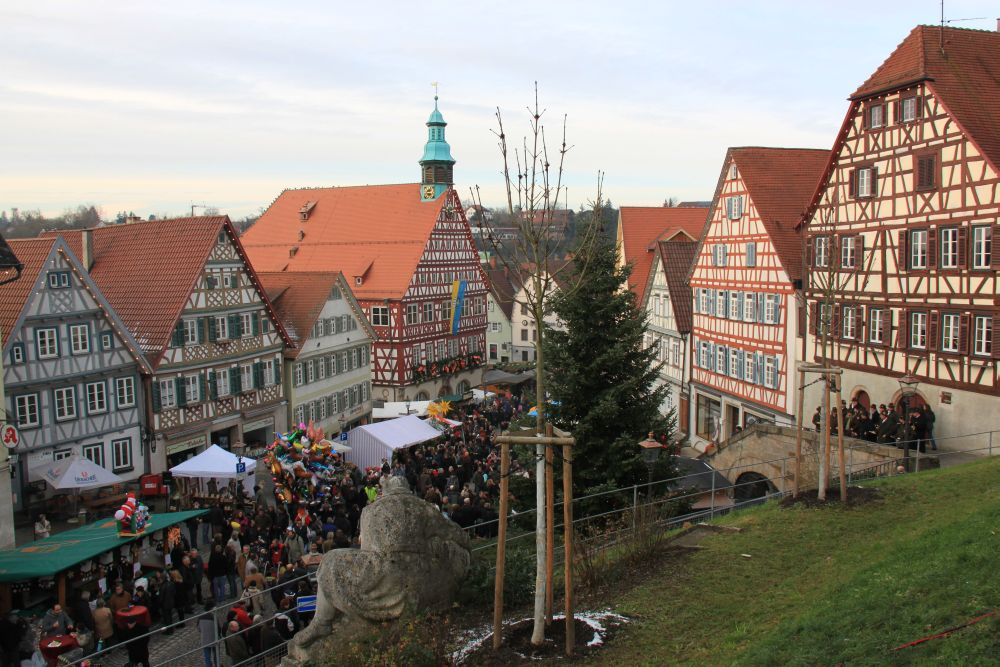
Christmas market 2010

== Twin towns – sister cities ==
Backnang is twinned with:

- Annonay, France
- Bácsalmás, Hungary
- Chelmsford, England, United Kingdom

== Notable people ==
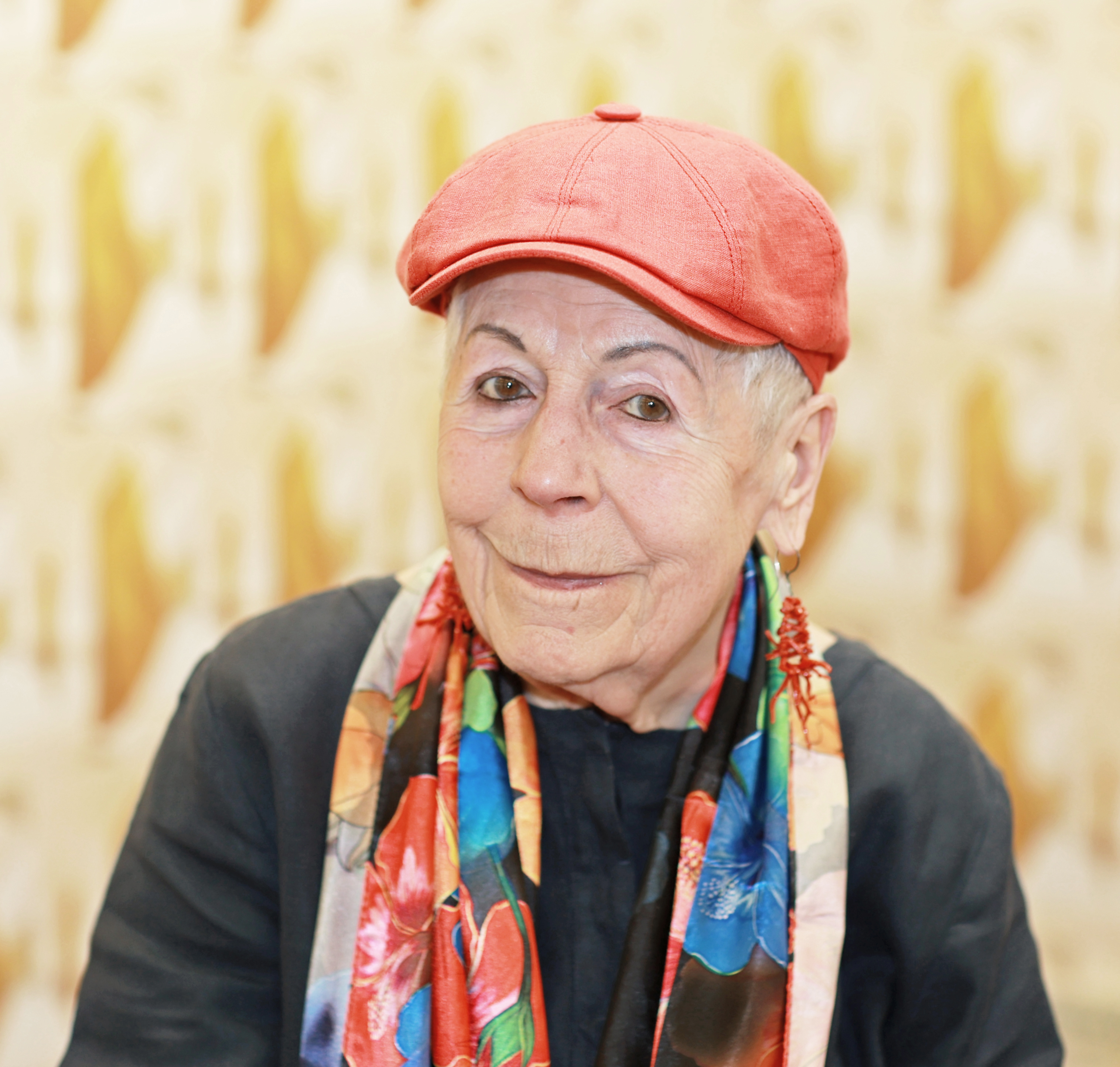
Ursula Sax, 2023

- Johannes Magirus the elder (1537–1614), Lutheran Theologian.
- Eduard Breuninger, (DE Wiki) (1854–1932), entrepreneur, founder of Breuninger company
- Anna Ziegler (1882–1942), politician (USPD, SPD), mayor of Nuremberg, member of the Reichstag
- Ferdinand Schneider (1911–1984), chemist, researched sugar technology
- Ursula Sax (born 1935), visual artist and sculptor.
- Alois Albrecht (1936–2022), Roman Catholic priest and songwriter
- Volker Hauff (born 1940), politician (SPD), MP, Federal Minister, former mayor of Frankfurt am Main
- Thomas Mayer (born 1954), Chief Economist of the Deutsche Bank, 2010 to 2012.
- Jens Weidmann (born 1968), president of the Bundesbank, 2011 and 2021, did his Abitur in Backnang
- Gültekin Kaan (born ca.1975), a Turkish German musician and singer
- Gregor Meyle (born 1978), German singer-songwriter.
- Ralf Nentwich (born 1982), German politician
- Christina Stumpp (born 1987), politician (CDU), Member of the German Bundestag since 2021

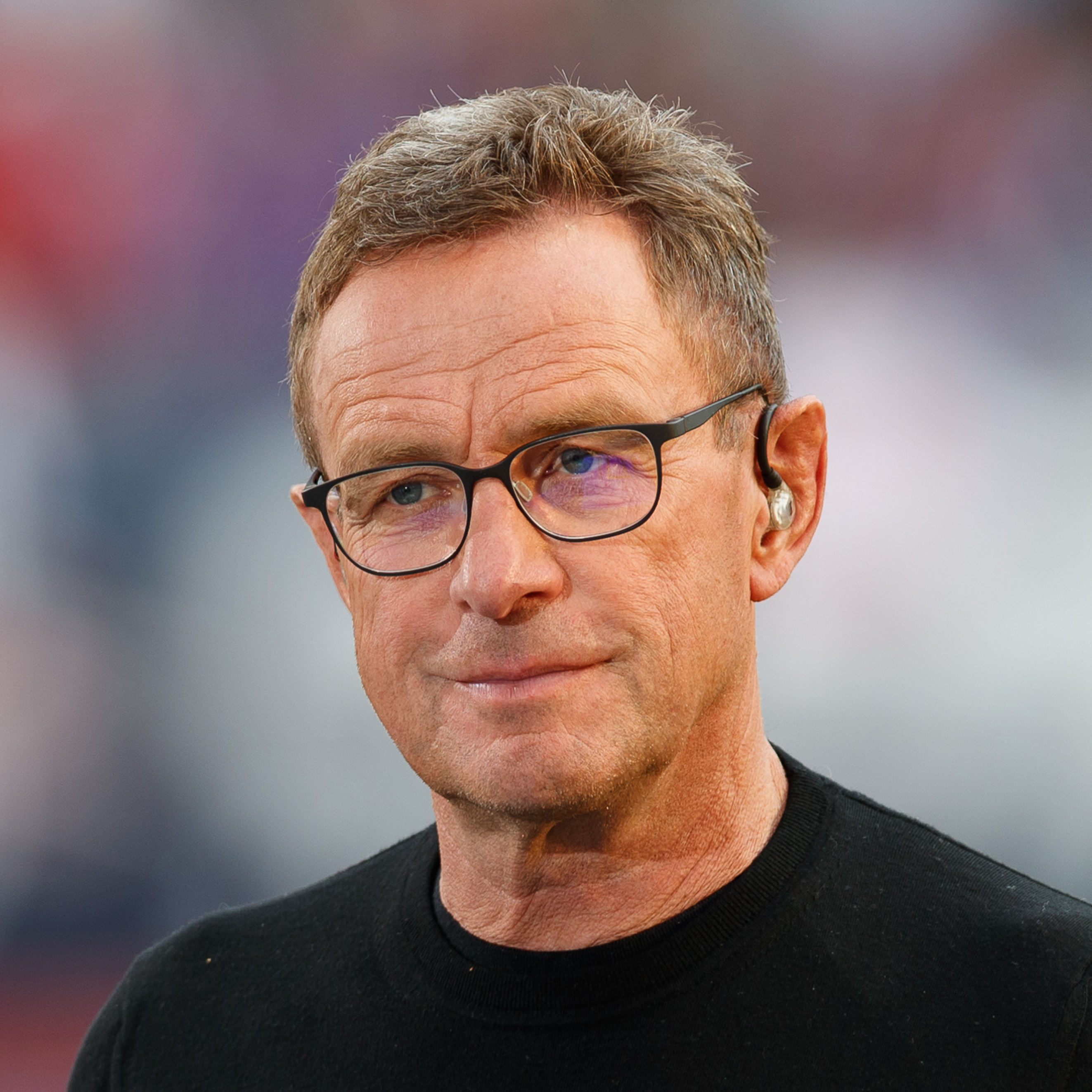
Ralf Rangnick, 2022

=== Sport ===
- Ralf Rangnick (born 1958), football manager, manager of Austria national football team
- Patrick Bauer (born 1992), footballer and play-off winner with Charlton Athletic, played over 300 games
- Andreas Hinkel (born 1982), footballer with SC Freiburg played 282 games and 21 for Germany
- Julian Schieber (born 1989), Hertha Berlin and Germany footballer, played 190 games
- Viola Brand (born 1994), retired artistic cyclist
