= Serafino Porrecta =

Italian Dominican theologian

Serafino Porrecta (b. 1536; d. at Bologna, 2 January 1614) was an Italian Dominican theologian.

His family name was Capponi; he was called a Porrecta from his place of birth.

He is best known as a commentator on the Summa of Thomas Aquinas; he also wrote commentaries on the books of the Old and New Testaments.

== Life ==
He joined the Dominican Order at Bologna in 1552. His life was devoted entirely to study, teaching, writing, and preaching.

He taught philosophy, theology (dogmatic and moral), and Sacred Scripture. In 1606, Capponi was invited to teach theology and Sacred Scripture to the Carthusians in a monastery near Bologna. He accepted the invitation, but two years later he was recalled to Bologna, where he died. Giovanni Michele Pio, who wrote his life, states that on the last day of his life Porrecta completed his explanation on the last verse of the Psalms. The people of Bologna venerated him as a saint; miracles are said to have been wrought through his intercession, and his body was taken (1615) from the community burying-ground to be deposited in the Dominican church.

== Works ==
Until the Leonine edition of Thomas Aquinas's works appeared, the Porrecta-Cajetan commentaries were classical. Features of these commentaries are set forth in the title of the Venice edition of 1612. His principal works are:

- Elucidationes formales in summam theologicam S. Thomae de Aquino (Venice, 1588, 1596);
- Summa totius theologiae D. Thomae ... cum elucidationibus formalibus ... (Venice, 1612; Padua, 1698; Rome, 1773).

To the first volume were added:

- De altitudine doctrinae Thomisticae; Regulae ad lectorem; Five indices.

Jacques Échard censures the addition of the Expositio in primam partem and Tractatus de praescientia et praedestinationa of Giovanni Crisostomo Javèlli;

- Veritates aureae supra totam legem veterem ... (Venice, 1590);
- "Commentaries on St. Matthew" (Venice, 1602);
- "St. John" (Venice, 1604); those on St. Mark and St. Luke were not published;
- Scholia super comp. Theologicae veritatis Alberti Magni (Venice, 1588, 1590). Échard says the compendium was not by Albertus Magnus (I, p. 176);
- Tota theologia S. Th. Aquin. In compendium redacta (Venice, 1597);
- Commentarii in psalmos (one volume published, Bologna, 1692).
