= Henrich Smet =

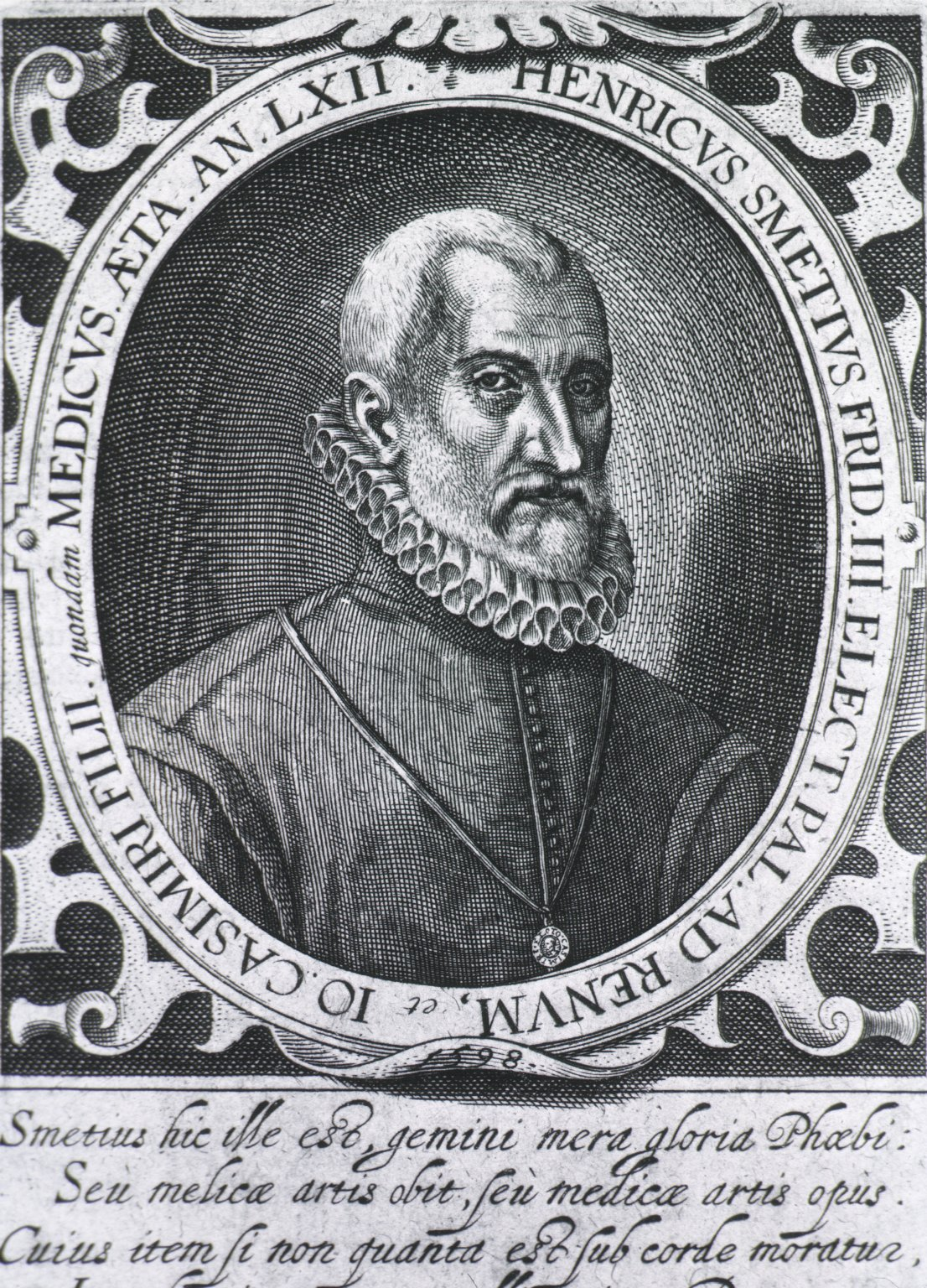
- Henrich Smet
- Born: 1535; Lede
- Died: 14 March 1614 (aged 78–79); Heidelberg
- Education: University of Bologna
- Scientific career
- Academic advisors: Thomas Erastus

Henrich Smet (also Henricus Smetius Alostanus, Henricus Smetius a Leda, or Hendrik de Smet) (29 June 1535 or 1537 – 15 March 1614, Heidelberg) was a physician and humanist scholar.

== Life ==
Smet was the son of Robert Smet (d. 1540) and initially studied with John Otho in Ghent (1552–54). He met several students there that like him would eventually make a name for themselves in the world of letters. Barely fifteen, he translated the Gnomae Pythagorae ac Phocylidis and the Batrachomyomachia (then ascribed to Homer) from Classical Greek and the Historia Susannae from Latin and also displayed skill in the Latin poetry. He studied medicine at Leuven, Rostock and Heidelberg and took his doctorate in 1561 in Bologna. He established a medical practice in Antwerp. As a result of his Protestant convictions, he left Antwerp during the tumult of 1567 for Duisburg. He then moved to Lemgo and was the court physician of the Count of Lippe. In 1574 he moved to Heidelberg and became court physician to the Elector Palatine, Frederick III. When Frederick died in 1576, he was succeeded by his Lutheran son Elector Louis VI who removed the Reformed faculty from the University of Heidelberg, Smet briefly practiced medicine in Frankenthal. After 1579 he entered the service of Count Palatine Johann Casimir and began to give medical lectures in the Casimirianum in Neustadt. He returned to the University of Heidelberg with the rest of the medical faculty in 1585 after Johann Casimir became the regent of the Palatinate.

Besides medicine, he was interested in philology and poetry. He compiled a dictionary of Latin words, which was so successful that it was frequently reprinted throughout the seventeenth century.

Many letters from Smet from the period 1585-93 are preserved in the archive of the University of Heidelberg.

Smet married Johanna van den Corput in 1562, sister of the humanist and pastor Hendrik van den Corput.

== Works ==
- Henrici Smetii (...) Juvenilia sacra regnum judaïcorum. Heidelberg, 1594.
- Henrici Smetii, Parentalia (...). Heidelberg, 1594.
- Miscellanea (...) Medica. Frankfurt: Jonas Rhodius, 1611. VD 17 23:290916S
- Oratio de febri tertiana intermittente. Heidelberg, 1587.
- Prosodia Henrici Smetii, med. d. prontissima (...). Frankfurt, 1599.
- Prosodia in novam formam digesta. Amsterdam, bij H. & T. Boom, 1683, (One of the many reprints of the work of 1599)
- Ueber Alter und Vortrefflichkeit der Medicin: aus dem Lateinischen des Henricus Smetius a Leda, ed. Gustav Waltz. 1889.
