= Bartholomäus Scultetus =

German astronomer and cartographer (1540–1614)

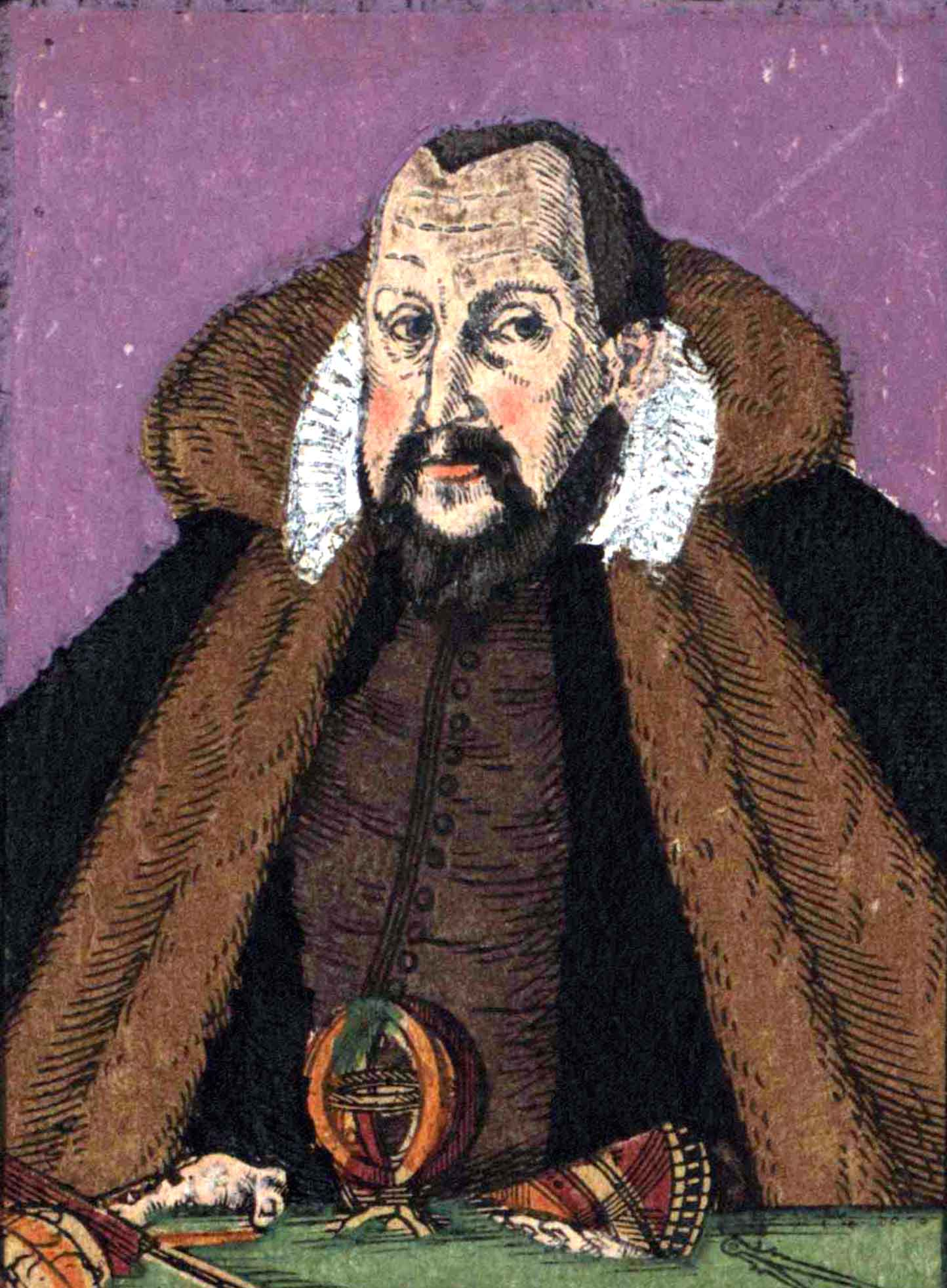
- Born: Barthel Schulze; 14 May 1540; Near Görlitz, Holy Roman Empire
- Died: 21 June 1614 (aged 74); Görlitz, Holy Roman Empire
- Education: University of Wittenberg
- Occupations: mathematician; calendarist; cartographer
- Spouses: Agnes Winkler (m. 1570; died 1572); Helene Röber (m. 1573)
- Children: 6

Bartholomäus Scultetus (born Barthel Schulze; 14 May 1540 – 21 June 1614) was a German mathematician, calendarist, cartographer, and municipal official. He was active in the local politics of Görlitz and served as its mayor on several occasions.

== Early life and education ==
Barthel Schulz was born at his family's manor farm near Görlitz on 14 May 1540, to Ursula Eichler and Martin Scholz. He was educated at the school in Görlitz. He enrolled at the University of Wittenberg on 1 September 1557, but transferred to Leipzig University in 1559. In Leipzig he lived with Johann Hommel, who taught him to make mathematical instruments, and met Tycho Brahe. Scultetus graduated from the University of Wittenberg with a doctorate in liberal arts and philosophy on 24 February 1564. He later communicated with Johannes Kepler.

== Career ==
Brahe commissioned Scultetus to create a Jacob's staff for use in more precise astronomical measurements. Scultetus returned to Görlitz in 1567, and was employed by arranging nativity accounts, making maps, and writing printed works.

Scultetus became a mathematician at the Görlitz Gymnasium in 1570. He earned 30 thalers per year in this position. He left his position at the gymnasium on 17 October 1584 due to his municipal duties.

The brewing rights and sizeable house Scultetus owned meant that he was one of the wealthiest residents of Görlitz. Scultetus was appointed to collect imperial beer taxes in 1571, and was the saltworks register from 1595 to 1614. He was the bailiff in Niederdorf from 1577 to 1579. He became a councilor in 1578. He was a chamberlain in 1585 and 1588. From 1589 to 1593, he served as a town judge. He served as mayor of Görlitz in 1592, 1596, 1600, 1604, 1608, and 1612. He also served as a churchwarden.

Starting in 1567, Scultetus created a calendar. The introduction of the Gregorian calendar in Lusatia in 1584 was pushed by Scultetus. He successfully lobbied Rudolf II, Holy Roman Emperor to adopt the calendar as well.

Augustus, Elector of Saxony, commissioned Scultetus to make a map of Meissen in 1568. Scultetus was a member of an imperial mission to Moscow in 1572, and attempted to become the court cartographer for Ivan the Terrible. A delegation from Moscow commissioned him to create a map of Moscow around 1595. He drew one of the first maps that included the boundaries of the Sorbs and German languages. His map of Upper Lusatia, which was developed after he conducted 11 tours between 1581 and 1586, was noted for its accuracy.

Scultetus wrote over thirty works, mainly dealing with astronomy or mathematics. He published almanacs and prognostications from 1568 to 1609. The Convivium Musicum, a social circle from 1570 to 1614 that played music, wrote poetry, and discussed scholarly issues, was founded by Scultetus.

== Personal life ==
Scultetus was an adherent to Lutheranism, but dedicated some of his works to Catholic officials, including the archbishop of Prague, and frequently wrote to Johannes Leisentritt. He participated in scholarly debates with the rabbi Judah Loew ben Bezalel.

Scultetus married Agnes Winkler, who was a widow, on 24 April 1570, but she died on 15 August 1572. He married Helene Röber, a 15-year-old, on 26 January 1573, and the couple had six children. He died in Görlitz on 21 June 1614, and was buried at St. Nicholas Church.

== Works cited ==
=== Books ===
- Christ, Martin (2021). Biographies of a Reformation: Religious Change and Confessional Coexistence in Upper Lusatia, c. 1520-1635. Oxford University Press. ISBN 9780191904684.

=== Journals ===
- Bönisch, Fritz (1967). "The Geometrical Accuracy of 16th and 17th Century Topographical Surveys". Imago Mundi. 21. Routledge: 62–69. doi:10.1080/03085696708592300. JSTOR 1150480.

=== Web ===
- "Bartholomäus Scultetus". Free University of Berlin. 10 July 2008. Archived from the original on 6 November 2025.
- "Scultetus, Bartholomaeus". University of Bremen. Archived from the original on 6 November 2025.
