= Song Wan (poet) =

Chinese poet and government official

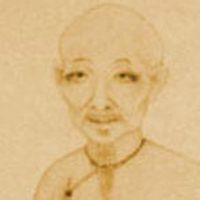

Personal details
- Born: 1614 Laiyang, Shandong, China
- Died: 1673 (aged 58–59) Chengdu, Sichuan, China
- Full name: Surname: Sòng (宋); Given name: Wǎn (琬); Courtesy name: Yùshū (玉叔)

Song Wan (Chinese: 宋琬; pinyin: Sòng Wǎn; Wade–Giles: Sung Wan; 1614–1673), also known as Song Lichang, courtesy name Yushu (Chinese: 玉叔; pinyin: Yùshū), was a Chinese poet and government official active during the early Qing dynasty. The son of a Ming loyalist, Song was a high-flying Qing official and well-regarded poet. Regarded as one of the "eight great Qing-dynasty poets", he died in 1673 at age 59.

== Early life and career ==
Song Wan was born in 1614 in Laiyang, Shandong, China. His father was a patriotic Ming official who killed himself following the decline of the dynasty. Song was described as a "filial" son and a conscientious learner. In 1649 he became a civil servant, albeit one under the Qing regime that his father detested, and rose in the ranks quickly. His career as a government official came to a pause after he was accused of working with conspirators during the 1661 Shandong Rebellion, also known as the Yu Qi Rebellion, while he was Chief Inquisitor of Zhejiang. He served three years in prison, along with his family. It was discovered that one of his relatives had reported him for treason; in light of that, Song was cleared of all charges in 1664. Song became Censor of Sichuan in 1672. Song Wan was also a prolific linguist. He was most interested in poetry and 1333 poems by Song are still in existence. The Library of Laiyang houses sixteen volumes of Song Wan poems, which is the largest such collection.

== Death and legacy ==
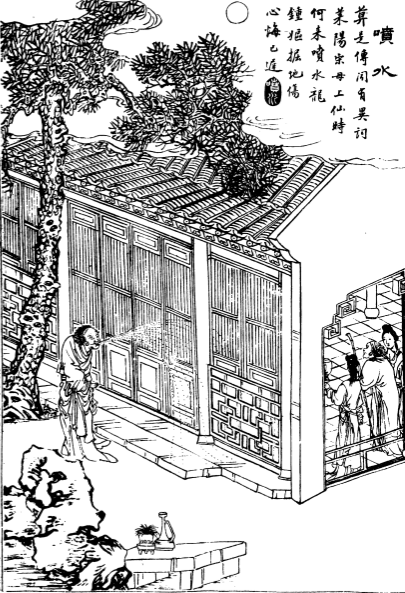
19th-century illustration of "Squirting" from Xiangzhu liaozhai zhiyi tuyong (Liaozhai Zhiyi with commentary and illustrations; 1886)

A year after moving to Sichuan, in 1673, rebels led by Ming general Wu Sangui seized the capital Chengdu; Song, after being informed of this, "died of panic and fright". He was aged 59.

Song Wan is considered to be one of the "eight great Qing-dynasty poets". His former residence in Laiyang is now a local museum. According to the museum director, Song was an incredibly popular poet whose works were "read by everyone", hailing him as a major inspiration to Chinese poetry.

Chiang (2005) states that "Song Wan's life story (...) may be read of the impossibility of adhering to (Confucian ideals)." Song is one of the protagonists of the short story "Squirting" (噴水; also known as "Spraying Water") by Pu Songling in Strange Tales from a Chinese Studio. The tale narrates the Song's maids' and mother's encounter with an elderly ghost who spouts water (squirts); the incident allegedly occurred when Song was working for the government and had to travel away from home.
