= Sylvestre (surname) =

Sylvestre is a surname of French origin. Notable people with the surname include:

== Actors ==
- Cleo Sylvestre (1945–2024), English actress
- Simone Sylvestre (1923–2020), French film actress

== Singers ==
- Anne Sylvestre (1934–2020), French singer
- Patrice Sylvestre (born 1973), French singer of Guadeloupe origin, known by the stage name Slaï
- Sergio Sylvestre (born 1990), Italian pop singer

== Sports figures ==
- Alain Sylvestre (born 1979), Canadian kickboxer
- Brian Sylvestre (born 1992), Haitian-American soccer goalkeeper
- Eddy Sylvestre (born 1999), French footballer
- Jérôme Sylvestre (born 1979), Canadian snowboarder
- Jules Sylvestre-Brac (born 1998), French footballer
- Leopold Sylvestre (1911–1972), Canadian speed skater
- Ludovic Sylvestre (born 1984), French footballer
- Noha Sylvestre (born 1997), Swiss footballer
- Patrick Sylvestre (born 1968), Swiss footballer
- Tommy Sylvestre (born 1946), Togo football goalkeeper

== Other ==
- Armand Sylvestre (disambiguation)
- Guy Sylvestre (1918–2010), Canadian literary critic, librarian and civil servant
- Joseph-Noël Sylvestre (1847–1926), French painter
- Liza Sylvestre (born 1983), American visual artist
- Louis Sylvestre (1832–1914), farmer and political figure in Quebec
- Olivier Sylvestre (born 1982), Canadian writer
- René Sylvestre (1962–2021), Haitian jurist and lawyer

== See also ==
- Sylvestre (disambiguation)
