= 2017–18 West Ham United F.C. season =

English football team season

West Ham United
2017–18 season
- Co-chairmen: David Gold; David Sullivan
- Manager: Slaven Bilić (until 6 November); David Moyes (from 7 November)
- Stadium: London Stadium
- Premier League: 13th
- FA Cup: Fourth round
- EFL Cup: Quarter-finals
- Top goalscorer: League: Marko Arnautović (11 goals); All: Marko Arnautović (11 goals)
- Average home league attendance: 56,885
Home colours	Away colours	Third colours

The 2017–18 season was West Ham United's sixth consecutive campaign in the Premier League since being promoted in the 2011–12 season. It was West Ham's 22nd Premier League campaign overall, their 60th top flight appearance in their 123rd year in existence, and their second in the London Stadium. The club were unable to play any games at the stadium until September, allowing for the time to convert it back to a football stadium following the 2017 World Championships in Athletics in August 2017.

Aside of the Premier League, West Ham United took part in the FA Cup and League Cup, entering at the third round in the FA Cup and the second round in the EFL Cup.

On 7 November 2017 David Moyes was appointed manager on a six-month contract. West Ham were eighteenth in the Premier Division at the time on nine points having played eleven games.

== Squad ==
=== First team squad ===
Squad No.	Name	Nationality	Position (s)	Date of birth (age)	Signed from
Goalkeepers
13	Adrián	(Spain)	GK	3 January 1987 (age 39)	(Spain) Real Betis
25	Joe Hart	(England)	GK	19 April 1987 (age 39)	(England) Manchester City (on loan)
Defenders
2	Winston Reid	(New Zealand)	CB	3 July 1988 (age 38)	(Denmark) Midtjylland
3	Aaron Cresswell	(England)	LB	15 December 1989 (age 36)	(England) Ipswich Town
5	Pablo Zabaleta	(Argentina)	RB	16 January 1985 (age 41)	(England) Manchester City
19	James Collins	(Wales)	CB	23 August 1983 (age 43)	(England) Aston Villa
21	Angelo Ogbonna	(Italy)	CB	23 May 1988 (age 38)	(Italy) Juventus
22	Sam Byram	(England)	RB	16 September 1993 (age 33)	(England) Leeds United
26	Arthur Masuaku	(France)	LB	7 November 1993 (age 33)	(Greece) Olympiacos
41	Declan Rice	(Republic of Ireland)	CB	14 January 1999 (age 27)	Academy
Midfielders
7	Marko Arnautović	(Austria)	LM	19 April 1989 (age 37)	(England) Stoke City
8	Cheikhou Kouyaté	(Senegal)	DM/CB	21 December 1989 (age 36)	(Belgium) Anderlecht
10	Manuel Lanzini	(Argentina)	AM	15 February 1993 (age 33)	(United Arab Emirates) Al Jazira
14	Pedro Obiang	(Spain)	CM/DM	27 March 1992 (age 34)	(Italy) Sampdoria
16	Mark Noble	(England)	CM	8 May 1987 (age 39)	Academy
18	João Mário	(Portugal)	AM	19 January 1993 (age 33)	(Italy) Inter Milan (on loan)
23	Sead Hakšabanović	(Montenegro)	AM	4 May 1999 (age 27)	(Sweden) Halmstads BK
30	Michail Antonio	(England)	RM	28 March 1990 (age 36)	(England) Nottingham Forest
31	Edimilson Fernandes	(Switzerland)	CM	15 May 1996 (age 30)	(Switzerland) Sion
36	Domingos Quina	(Portugal)	AM	18 November 1999 (age 26)	(England) Chelsea
Forwards
9	Andy Carroll	(England)	ST	6 January 1989 (age 37)	(England) Liverpool
12	Jordan Hugill	(England)	ST	4 June 1992 (age 34)	(England) Preston North End
17	Javier Hernández	(Mexico)	ST	1 June 1988 (age 38)	(Germany) Bayer Leverkusen
29	Toni Martínez	(Spain)	ST	30 June 1997 (age 29)	(Spain) Valencia

== Friendlies ==
West Ham arranged six pre-season friendlies, beginning against Sturm Graz II on 17 July 2017 in Bad Waltersdorf, Austria, before facing fellow London side Fulham on 20 July in Graz. West Ham then travelled to Germany, where they faced Werder Bremen in a two-legged tie over two days for the Betway Cup which they lost, 3–2 on aggregate, followed by a friendly with Altona 93 on 1 August. West Ham then flew to Iceland to take on fellow Premier League side Manchester City in Reykjavík.

In March 2018, with a break in Premier League action due to FA Cup and international games, the club travelled to financially struggling Dagenham & Redbridge for a fundraising game.

17 July 2017 Friendly	Sturm Graz II	0–0	West Ham United	Bad Waltersdorf, Austria
18:30 CEST		Report		Stadium: Thermenstadion

20 July 2017 Friendly	West Ham United	2–1	Fulham	Graz, Austria
19:00 CEST	Lanzini 14'; Fletcher 40'	Report	Sessegnon 81'	Stadium: Sportzentrum Weinzödl

28 July 2017 Betway Cup	Werder Bremen	1–0	West Ham United	Schneverdingen, Germany
18:30 CEST	Eggestein 12'	Report		Stadium: Osterwald-Stadion; Attendance: 3,350

29 July 2017 Betway Cup	Werder Bremen	2–2 (3–2 agg.)	West Ham United	Lohne, Germany
15:30 CEST	Caldirola 15'; Zhang Yuning 81'	Report	Arnautović 26'; Martínez 75'	Stadium: Heinz-Dettmer; Attendance: 3,646

1 August 2017 Friendly	Altona 93	3–3	West Ham United	Hamburg, Germany
18:30 CEST	Brisevac 5'; Thiessen 39'; Strode 58'	Report	Martínez 6'; Reid (yellow card) 42' (yellow-red card) 42'; Ayew 53'; Du Preez 72' (o.g.)	Stadium: Adolf-Jäger-Kampfbahn; Attendance: 5,000

4 August 2017 Friendly	Manchester City	3–0	West Ham United	Reykjavík, Iceland
14:00 CEST	Jesus 8'; Agüero 55'; Sterling 70'	Report		Stadium: Laugardalsvöllur; Attendance: 6,237

21 March 2018 Friendly	Dagenham & Redbridge	1–3	West Ham United	Dagenham, London
19:30 GMT	Bloomfield 60'	Report	Antonio 42', 56'; Hugill 87'	Stadium: Chigwell Construction Stadium; Attendance: 4,515; Referee: Tim Robinson

== Competitions ==
=== Overview ===
Competition	Record							
Competition	P	W	D	L	GF	GA	GD	Win %
Premier League	38	10	12	16	48	68	−20	26.32
FA Cup	3	1	1	1	1	2	−1	33.33
League Cup	4	3	0	1	8	3	+5	75.00
Total	45	14	13	18	57	73	−16	31.11

Updated to match played 13 May 2018
Source: Competitions

=== Premier League ===
==== League table ====
Pos	Team	Pld	W	D	L	GF	GA	GD	Pts
11	Crystal Palace	38	11	11	16	45	55	−10	44
12	Bournemouth	38	11	11	16	45	61	−16	44
13	West Ham United	38	10	12	16	48	68	−20	42
14	Watford	38	11	8	19	44	64	−20	41
15	Brighton & Hove Albion	38	9	13	16	34	54	−20	40

Source: Premier League
Rules for classification: 1) Points; 2) Goal difference; 3) Goals scored. 4) Play-offs (only if needed to decide champion, teams for relegation or teams for UEFA competitions).

==== Results summary ====
Overall								Home						Away					
Pld	W	D	L	GF	GA	GD	Pts	W	D	L	GF	GA	GD	W	D	L	GF	GA	GD
38	10	12	16	48	68	−20	42	7	6	6	24	26	−2	3	6	10	24	42	−18

Last updated: 13 May 2018.
Source: Premier League

==== Results by matchday ====
Matchday	1	2	3	4	5	6	7	8	9	10	11	12	13	14	15	16	17	18	19	20	21	22	23	24	25	26	27	28	29	30	31	32	33	34	35	36	37	38
Ground	A	A	A	H	A	H	H	A	H	A	H	A	H	A	A	H	H	A	H	A	H	A	A	H	H	A	H	A	A	H	H	A	H	A	H	A	H	H
Result	L	L	L	W	D	L	W	D	L	D	L	L	D	L	L	W	D	W	L	D	W	D	W	D	D	L	W	L	L	L	W	D	D	L	L	W	D	W
Position	20	20	20	18	18	18	15	14	16	16	17	18	18	18	19	18	19	15	17	17	16	15	11	11	11	12	12	13	14	16	14	14	14	15	15	15	15	13

Updated to match(es) played on 13 May 2018. Source: 11v11
A = Away; H = Home; W = Win; D = Draw; L = Loss

==== Matches ====
Fixtures for the 2017–18 Premier League were announced on 14 June 2017, with West Ham travelling away to Manchester United on the opening weekend.

13 August 2017 1	Manchester United	4–0	West Ham United	Greater Manchester
16:00 BST	Lukaku 35', 52'; Bailly (yellow card) 43'; Valencia (yellow card) 60'; Martial 87'; Pogba 90'	Report	Zabaleta (yellow card) 51'; Ogbonna (yellow card) 66'	Stadium: Old Trafford; Attendance: 74,928; Referee: Martin Atkinson

19 August 2017 2	Southampton	3–2	West Ham United	Southampton
15:00 BST	Gabbiadini 11'; Tadić (yellow card) 15', (goal) 38' (pen.); Austin 90+3' (pen.)	Report	Arnautović (red card) 33'; Hernández 45', 74'; Zabaleta (yellow card) 90+1'	Stadium: St Mary's Stadium; Attendance: 31,424; Referee: Lee Mason

26 August 2017 3	Newcastle United	3–0	West Ham United	Newcastle upon Tyne
15:00 BST	Joselu 36'; Clark 72'; Merino (yellow card) 83'; Mitrović 86'	Report	Hernández (yellow card) 17'; Fernandes (yellow card) 65'; Sakho (yellow card) 78'	Stadium: St James' Park; Attendance: 52,093; Referee: Neil Swarbrick

11 September 2017 4	West Ham United	2–0	Huddersfield Town	Stratford, London
20:00 BST	Zabaleta (yellow card) 49'; Obiang 72'; Ayew 77'	Report	Jørgensen (yellow card) 25'; Billing (yellow card) 45'	Stadium: London Stadium; Attendance: 56,977; Referee: Kevin Friend

16 September 2017 5	West Bromwich Albion	0–0	West Ham United	West Bromwich
15:00 BST	Foster (yellow card) 66'; McClean (yellow card) 83'	Report	Zabaleta (yellow card) 9'; Antonio (yellow card) 90+6'	Stadium: The Hawthorns; Attendance: 24,942; Referee: Paul Tierney

23 September 2017 6	West Ham United	2–3	Tottenham Hotspur	Stratford, London
12:30 BST	Hernández 65', (yellow card) 81'; Kouyaté 87'; Ayew (yellow card) 90+3'; Reid (yellow card) 90+6'; Carroll (yellow card) 90+6'	Report	Kane 34', 38'; Eriksen 60'; Aurier (yellow card) 64' (yellow-red card) 70'; Dier (yellow card) 90+6'; Llorente (yellow card) 90+6'	Stadium: London Stadium; Attendance: 56,988; Referee: Michael Oliver

30 September 2017 7	West Ham United	1–0	Swansea City	Stratford, London
15:00 BST	Carroll (yellow card) 55'; Kouyaté (yellow card) 55'; Sakho 90', (yellow card) 90+1'	Report	Sanches (yellow card) 30'; Britton (yellow card) 49'	Stadium: London Stadium; Attendance: 56,922; Referee: Roger East

14 October 2017 8	Burnley	1–1	West Ham United	Burnley
15:00 BST	Defour (yellow card) 41'; Wood 85', (yellow card) 85'	Report	Antonio 19'; Carroll (yellow card) 25' (yellow-red card) 27'; Obiang (yellow card) 80'; Reid (yellow card) 85'	Stadium: Turf Moor; Attendance: 20,945; Referee: Stuart Attwell

20 October 2017 9	West Ham United	0–3	Brighton & Hove Albion	Stratford, London
20:00 BST	Hernández (yellow card) 23'	Report	Murray 10', 75' (pen.); Izquierdo 45+1'	Stadium: London Stadium; Attendance: 56,977; Referee: Martin Atkinson

28 October 2017 10	Crystal Palace	2–2	West Ham United	South Norwood
15:00 BST	Milivojević 50' (pen.); Dann (yellow card) 84'; Zaha 90+7'	Report	Hernández 31'; Zabaleta (yellow card) 37'; Ayew 43'; Masuaku (yellow card) 85'	Stadium: Selhurst Park; Attendance: 25,242; Referee: Bobby Madley

4 November 2017 11	West Ham United	1–4	Liverpool	Stratford, London
17:30 GMT	Noble (yellow card) 37'; Reid (yellow card) 47'; Lanzini 55', (yellow card) 90'	Report	Salah 21', 75'; Matip 24'; Oxlade-Chamberlain 56'	Stadium: London Stadium; Attendance: 56,961; Referee: Neil Swarbrick

19 November 2017 12	Watford	2–0	West Ham United	Watford
16:00 GMT	Hughes 11'; Britos (yellow card) 29'; Richarlison 64'	Report	Carroll (yellow card) 28'; Arnautović (yellow card) 35'; Obiang (yellow card) 41'; Noble (yellow card) 83'	Stadium: Vicarage Road; Attendance: 20,018; Referee: Andre Marriner

24 November 2017 13	West Ham United	1–1	Leicester City	Stratford, London
20:00 GMT	Kouyaté 45'; Ayew (yellow card) 79'	Report	Albrighton 8'; Gray (yellow card) 79'	Stadium: London Stadium; Attendance: 56,897; Referee: Martin Atkinson

29 November 2017 14	Everton	4–0	West Ham United	Liverpool
20:00 GMT	Rooney (penalty missed) 18', 18', 28', 66'; Sigurðsson (yellow card) 35'; Davies (yellow card) 53'; Williams 78'	Report	Zabaleta (yellow card) 26'; Lanzini (penalty missed) 59'	Stadium: Goodison Park; Attendance: 38,242; Referee: Michael Oliver

3 December 2017 15	Manchester City	2–1	West Ham United	Manchester
16:00 GMT	Otamendi 57'; De Bruyne (yellow card) 59'; D. Silva 83'; Jesus (yellow card) 90+5'	Report	Rice (yellow card) 17'; Ogbonna 44'; Adrián (yellow card) 90+4'	Stadium: City of Manchester Stadium; Attendance: 54,203; Referee: Mike Dean

9 December 2017 16	West Ham United	1–0	Chelsea	Stratford, London
12:30 GMT	Arnautović 6', (yellow card) 7'; Adrián (yellow card) 58'; Reid (yellow card) 67'; Cresswell (yellow card) 68'; Obiang (yellow card) 70'; Masuaku (yellow card) 87'	Report	Alonso (yellow card) 18'	Stadium: London Stadium; Attendance: 56,953; Referee: Anthony Taylor

13 December 2017 17	West Ham United	0–0	Arsenal	Stratford, London
20:00 GMT	Lanzini (yellow card) 41'; Reid (yellow card) 90+2'	Report		Stadium: London Stadium; Attendance: 56,921; Referee: Jonathan Moss

16 December 2017 18	Stoke City	0–3	West Ham United	Stoke-on-Trent
16:00 GMT	Wimmer (yellow card) 24'; Shawcross (yellow card) 50'	Report	Noble 19' (pen.); Masuaku (yellow card) 50'; Arnautović 75'; Sakho 86'	Stadium: Bet365 Stadium; Attendance: 29,265; Referee: Graham Scott

23 December 2017 19	West Ham United	2–3	Newcastle United	Stratford, London
15:00 GMT	Arnautović 6'; Ayew (penalty missed) 56', 69'; Kouyaté (yellow card) 77'	Report	Saivet 10'; Diamé 53'; Atsu 61', (yellow card) 67'	Stadium: London Stadium; Attendance: 56,955; Referee: Lee Mason

26 December 2017 20	AFC Bournemouth	3–3	West Ham United	Bournemouth
15:00 GMT	Gosling 29'; Francis (yellow card) 32'; Aké 57', (yellow card) 79'; Cook (yellow card) 71'; Wilson 90+3'	Report	Collins 7', (yellow card) 55'; Zabaleta (yellow card) 37'; Cresswell (yellow card) 56'; Arnautović 81', 89'; Ogbonna (yellow card) 87'	Stadium: Vitality Stadium; Attendance: 10,596; Referee: Bobby Madley

2 January 2018 21	West Ham United	2–1	West Bromwich Albion	Stratford, London
19:45 GMT	Lanzini (yellow card) 6'; Masuaku (yellow card) 44'; Carroll 59', 90+4', (yellow card) 61'	Report	McClean 30'; Yacob (yellow card) 74'; Krychowiak (yellow card) 90+6'	Stadium: London Stadium; Attendance: 56,888; Referee: Mike Jones

4 January 2018 22	Tottenham Hotspur	1–1	West Ham United	Wembley, London
20:00 GMT	Son 84'	Report	Obiang 70'; Carroll (yellow card) 87'; Noble (yellow card) 90'	Stadium: Wembley Stadium; Attendance: 50,034; Referee: Mike Dean

13 January 2018 23	Huddersfield Town	1–4	West Ham United	Huddersfield
15:00 GMT	Lolley 40'; Smith (yellow card) 31'	Report	Noble 25'; Arnautović 46'; Lanzini 56', 61'; Cresswell (yellow card) 76'	Stadium: John Smith's Stadium; Attendance: 24,105; Referee: Jonathan Moss

20 January 2018 24	West Ham United	1–1	AFC Bournemouth	Stratford, London
15:00 GMT	Collins (yellow card) 31'; Masuaku (yellow card) 49'; Ogbonna (yellow card) 58'; Hernández 73'	Report	Gosling (yellow card) 52'; Fraser 71'	Stadium: London Stadium; Attendance: 56,948; Referee: Martin Atkinson

30 January 2018 25	West Ham United	1–1	Crystal Palace	Stratford, London
19:45 GMT	Noble 43' (pen.); Byram (yellow card) 56'	Report	Milivojević (yellow card) 4'; Benteke 24'; Tomkins (yellow card) 45+5'; Townsend (yellow card) 69'	Stadium: London Stadium; Attendance: 56,911; Referee: Neil Swarbrick

3 February 2018 26	Brighton & Hove Albion	3–1	West Ham United	Falmer
15:00 GMT	Murray 8'; Dunk (yellow card) 50'; Izquierdo 59', (yellow card) 60'; Groß 75'; Stephens (yellow card) 81'	Report	Cresswell (yellow card) 8'; Hernández 30'	Stadium: Falmer Stadium; Attendance: 30,589; Referee: Roger East

10 February 2018 27	West Ham United	2–0	Watford	Stratford, London
15:00 GMT	Hernández 38'; Zabaleta (yellow card) 44'; Arnautović 78'	Report	Prödl (yellow card) 90'	Stadium: London Stadium; Attendance: 56,197; Referee: Graham Scott

24 February 2018 28	Liverpool	4–1	West Ham United	Liverpool
15:00 GMT	Can 29'; Salah 51'; Firmino 57'; Mané 77'	Report	Collins (yellow card) 43'; Kouyaté (yellow card) 47'; Antonio 59'	Stadium: Anfield; Attendance: 53,256; Referee: Stuart Attwell

3 March 2018 29	Swansea City	4–1	West Ham United	Swansea
15:00 GMT	Ki 8'; Van der Hoorn 32'; King 48'; J. Ayew 63' (pen.)	Report	Noble (yellow card) 41'; Arnautović (yellow card) 66'; Kouyaté (yellow card) 66'; Antonio 79'	Stadium: Liberty Stadium; Attendance: 20,829; Referee: Martin Atkinson

10 March 2018 30	West Ham United	0–3	Burnley	Stratford, London
15:00 GMT	Cresswell (yellow card) 40'; Lanzini (yellow card) 54'	Report	Westwood (yellow card) 57'; Barnes 66'; Wood 70', 81'; Lennon (yellow card) 76'	Stadium: London Stadium; Attendance: 56,904; Referee: Lee Mason

31 March 2018 31	West Ham United	3–0	Southampton	Stratford, London
15:00 BST	João Mário 13'; Arnautović 17', 45+4'	Report	Lemina (yellow card) 54'; Stephens (yellow card) 59'; Tadic (yellow card) 80'	Stadium: London Stadium; Attendance: 56,882; Referee: Jonathan Moss

8 April 2018 32	Chelsea	1–1	West Ham United	Fulham, London
16:30 BST	Azpilicueta 36'	Report	Noble (yellow card) 46'; Hernández 73'	Stadium: Stamford Bridge; Attendance: 41,324; Referee: Kevin Friend

16 April 2018 33	West Ham United	1–1	Stoke City	Stratford, London
20:00 BST	Kouyaté (yellow card) 85'; Carroll 90'; Cresswell (yellow card) 90+2'	Report	Crouch 79', (yellow card) 79'; Martins Indi (yellow card) 82'; Ndiaye (yellow card) 90+1'	Stadium: London Stadium; Attendance: 56,795; Referee: Michael Oliver

22 April 2018 34	Arsenal	4–1	West Ham United	Holloway, London
13:30 BST	Xhaka (yellow card) 41'; Monreal 51'; Maitland-Niles (yellow card) 62'; Mustafi (yellow card) 74'; Ramsey 84'; Lacazette 85', 89'	Report	Zabaleta (yellow card) 50'; Arnautović 64'	Stadium: Emirates Stadium; Attendance: 59,422; Referee: Lee Mason

29 April 2018 35	West Ham United	1–4	Manchester City	Stratford, London
14:15 BST	Cresswell 42'	Report	Sané 13'; Zabaleta 27' (o.g.); Otamendi (yellow card) 37'; Jesus 53'; Fernandinho 64'	Stadium: London Stadium; Attendance: 56,904; Referee: Neil Swarbrick

5 May 2018 36	Leicester City	0–2	West Ham United	Leicester
15:00 GMT	Dragović (yellow card) 64'	Report	João Mário 34'; Arnautović (yellow card) 41'; Cresswell (yellow card) 49'; Noble 64'	Stadium: King Power Stadium; Attendance: 32,013; Referee: Chris Kavanagh

10 May 2018 37	West Ham United	0–0	Manchester United	Stratford, London
19:45 GMT	Noble (yellow card) 88'	Report	Pogba (yellow card) 88'	Stadium: London Stadium; Attendance: 56,902; Referee: Jon Moss

13 May 2018 38	West Ham United	3–1	Everton	Stratford, London
15:00 BST	Lanzini 39', 82'; Arnautović 63'	Report	Funes Mori (yellow card) 16'; Niasse 74'	Stadium: London Stadium; Attendance: 56,926; Referee: Graham Scott

=== EFL Cup ===
West Ham United entered the competition in the second round and were drawn away to Cheltenham Town. West Ham won the match 2–0 with first-half goals from Diafra Sakho and André Ayew, their first goals of the season. A home match versus Bolton Wanderers was announced for the third round. A fourth round away trip to face Tottenham Hotspur was drawn. In the game, played at Wembley Stadium, West Ham beat Tottenham 3–2 having been 2–0 down at half-time. West Ham's goals were scored by Angelo Ogbonna and two by André Ayew. A quarter-final trip to face Arsenal was confirmed for the Hammers.

23 August 2017 Second round	Cheltenham Town	0–2	West Ham United	Cheltenham
19:45 BST		Report	Sakho 40'; Ayew 43'	Stadium: Whaddon Road; Attendance: 6,259; Referee: Oliver Langford

19 September 2017 Third round	West Ham United	3–0	Bolton Wanderers	Stratford, London
19:45 BST	Ogbonna 4'; Sakho 31'; Holland (yellow card) 87'; Masuaku 90+3'	Report	Taylor (yellow card) 43'; Pratley (yellow card) 85'	Stadium: London Stadium; Attendance: 35,806; Referee: Simon Hooper

25 October 2017 Fourth round	Tottenham Hotspur	2–3	West Ham United	Wembley, London
20:00 BST	Sissoko 6'; Alli 37'	Report	Ayew 55', 60'; Ogbonna 70'	Stadium: Wembley Stadium; Attendance: 36,168; Referee: Mike Dean

19 December 2017 Quarter-finals	Arsenal	1–0	West Ham United	Holloway, London
19:45 GMT	Welbeck 42'	Report	Hart (yellow card) 71'	Stadium: Emirates Stadium; Attendance: 44,741; Referee: Kevin Friend

=== FA Cup ===
West Ham United joined the FA Cup in the third round and were drawn away to Shrewsbury Town.

7 January 2018 Third round	Shrewsbury Town	0–0	West Ham United	Shrewsbury
14:00 GMT		Report		Stadium: New Meadow; Attendance: 9,535; Referee: Paul Tierney

16 January 2018 Third round replay	West Ham United	1–0 (a.e.t.)	Shrewsbury Town	Stratford, London
19:45 GMT	Burke 112'	Report	Nolan (yellow card) 66'; Ogogo (yellow card) 71'	Stadium: London Stadium; Attendance: 39,867; Referee: Jeremy Simpson

27 January 2018 Fourth round	Wigan Athletic	2–0	West Ham United	Wigan
15:00 GMT	Grigg 7', 62' (pen.); Colclough (yellow card) 84'	Report	Masuaku (red card) 49'; Ogbonna (yellow card) 79'	Stadium: DW Stadium; Attendance: 14,194; Referee: Chris Kavanagh

== Transfers ==
=== Transfers in ===
Date from	Position	Nationality	Name	From	Fee	Ref.
26 May 2017	DF	(Argentina)	Pablo Zabaleta	Manchester City	Free	
19 July 2017	MF	(Netherlands)	Anouar El Mhassani	(Netherlands) Ajax	Undisclosed	
22 July 2017	MF	(Austria)	Marko Arnautović	Stoke City	£20,000,000 (Note: £5,000,000 in potential add-ons)	
24 July 2017	FW	(Mexico)	Javier Hernández	(Germany) Bayer Leverkusen	£16,000,000	
7 August 2017	MF	(Montenegro)	Sead Hakšabanović	(Sweden) Halmstads BK	£2,700,000	
31 January 2018	FW	(England)	Jordan Hugill	Preston North End	Undisclosed	
1 February 2018	FW	(England)	Oladapo Afolayan	Solihull Moors	Undisclosed	
7 February 2018	DF	(France)	Patrice Evra	Marseille	Free	

=== Transfers out ===
Date from	Position	Nationality	Name	To	Fee	Ref.
25 May 2017	DF	(Spain)	Álvaro Arbeloa	Retired		(Note: Álvaro Arbeloa announced his retirement following his release.)
25 May 2017	FW	(England)	Sam Ford	Felixstowe & Walton United	Released	
25 May 2017	GK	(England)	Sam Howes	Watford	Free	(Note: Sam Howes joined Watford following his release.)
25 May 2017	DF	(England)	Kyle Knoyle	Swindon Town	Free	(Note: Kyle Knoyle joined Swindon Town following his release.)
25 May 2017	DF	(England)	Sam Westley	Free agent	Released	
20 June 2017	MF	(Norway)	Håvard Nordtveit	(Germany) 1899 Hoffenheim	Undisclosed	
22 June 2017	DF	(Scotland)	Stephen Hendrie	Southend United	Free	(Note: Stephen Hendrie joined Southend United following his departure.)
22 June 2017	GK	(Switzerland)	Raphael Spiegel	(Portugal) Boavista	Free	(Note: Raphael Spiegel joined Boavista following his departure.)
13 July 2017	FW	(Ecuador)	Enner Valencia	(Mexico) Tigres UANL	Undisclosed	
16 July 2017	MF	(England)	George Dobson	(Netherlands) Sparta Rotterdam	Undisclosed	
22 July 2017	GK	(Republic of Ireland)	Darren Randolph	Middlesbrough	£5,000,000	
28 July 2017	FW	(England)	Ashley Fletcher	Middlesbrough	£6,500,000	
14 August 2017	MF	(Algeria)	Sofiane Feghouli	(Turkey) Galatasaray	£4,000,000	
29 January 2018	FW	(Senegal)	Diafra Sakho	(France) Rennes	Undisclosed	
31 January 2018	FW	(Ghana)	André Ayew	(Wales) Swansea City	Undisclosed	
23 February 2018	DF	(Portugal)	José Fonte	(China) Dalian Yifang	Undisclosed	
3 April 2018	RB	(England)	Alex Pike	Free agent	Released	

=== Loans in ===
Date from	Position	Nationality	Name	From	Date until	Ref.
18 July 2017	GK	(England)	Joe Hart	Manchester City	30 June 2018	
26 January 2018	MF	(Portugal)	João Mário	(Italy) Internazionale	30 June 2018	

=== Loans out ===
Date from	Position	Nationality	Name	To	Date until	Ref.
21 June 2017	DF	(England)	Reece Oxford	(Germany) Borussia Mönchengladbach	30 June 2018 (Note: Oxford briefly returned from his loan spell in January 2018, before returning to Borussia Mönchengladbach.)	
1 August 2017	DF	(England)	Reece Burke	Bolton Wanderers	30 June 2018 (Note: Burke briefly returned from his loan spell in January 2018, before returning to Bolton Wanderers.)	
1 August 2017	MF	(Republic of Ireland)	Josh Cullen	Bolton Wanderers	1 January 2018	
25 August 2017	MF	(Scotland)	Robert Snodgrass	Aston Villa	30 June 2018	
17 January 2018	MF	(Norway)	Martin Samuelsen	Burton Albion	30 June 2018	
31 January 2018	MF	(England)	Moses Makasi	Plymouth Argyle	30 June 2018	
1 February 2018	FW	(Spain)	Toni Martínez	(Spain) Real Valladolid	30 June 2018	

== Statistics ==
=== Appearances and goals ===
Correct as of match played 13 May 2018

No.	Pos	Nat	Player	Total		Premier League		EFL Cup		FA Cup	
No.	Pos	Nat	Player	Apps	Goals	Apps	Goals	Apps	Goals	Apps	Goals
Goalkeepers
13	GK	(Spain) ESP	Adrián	22	0	19	0	3	0	0	0
25	GK	(England) ENG	Joe Hart	23	0	19	0	1	0	3	0
Defenders
2	DF	(New Zealand) NZL	Winston Reid	19	0	17	0	1	0	1	0
3	DF	(England) ENG	Aaron Cresswell	39	1	35+1	1	2	0	1	0
5	DF	(Argentina) ARG	Pablo Zabaleta	39	0	37	0	0	0	1+1	0
19	DF	(Wales) WAL	James Collins	15	1	12+1	1	2	0	0	0
21	DF	(Italy) ITA	Angelo Ogbonna	39	3	32	1	4	2	3	0
22	DF	(England) ENG	Sam Byram	10	0	2+3	0	3	0	2	0
26	DF	(France) FRA	Arthur Masuaku	33	1	21+6	0	3	1	3	0
27	DF	(France) FRA	Patrice Evra	5	0	3+2	0	0	0	0	0
41	DF	(Republic of Ireland) IRL	Declan Rice	31	0	15+11	0	4	0	1	0
Midfielders
8	MF	(Senegal) SEN	Cheikhou Kouyaté	37	2	32+1	2	2+1	0	1	0
10	MF	(Argentina) ARG	Manuel Lanzini	29	5	23+4	5	1	0	1	0
14	MF	(Spain) ESP	Pedro Obiang	27	2	18+3	2	2+1	0	3	0
16	MF	(England) ENG	Mark Noble	33	4	28+1	4	3	0	0+1	0
18	MF	(Portugal) POR	João Mário	14	2	12+1	2	0	0	0+1	0
23	MF	(Montenegro) MNE	Sead Hakšabanović	2	0	0	0	1	0	0+1	0
30	MF	(England) ENG	Michail Antonio	21	3	16+5	3	0	0	0	0
31	MF	(Switzerland) SUI	Edimilson Fernandes	16	0	9+5	0	2	0	0	0
33	MF	(Republic of Ireland) IRL	Josh Cullen	5	0	0+2	0	0	0	3	0
36	MF	(Portugal) POR	Domingos Quina	4	0	0	0	1+2	0	0+1	0
37	MF	(England) ENG	Nathan Holland	1	0	0	0	0+1	0	0	0
Forwards
7	FW	(Austria) AUT	Marko Arnautović	35	11	28+3	11	1+2	0	0+1	0
9	FW	(England) ENG	Andy Carroll	18	3	7+9	3	1+1	0	0	0
12	FW	(England) ENG	Jordan Hugill	3	0	0+3	0	0	0	0	0
17	FW	(Mexico) MEX	Javier Hernández	33	8	16+12	8	1+2	0	2	0
Players who left the club permanently or on loan during the season
4	DF	(Portugal) POR	José Fonte	8	0	8	0	0	0	0	0
15	FW	(Senegal) SEN	Diafra Sakho	17	4	0+14	2	2+1	2	0	0
20	FW	(Ghana) GHA	André Ayew	24	6	9+9	3	4	3	2	0
29	FW	(Spain) ESP	Toni Martínez	3	0	0	0	0	0	2+1	0
32	DF	(England) ENG	Reece Burke	3	1	0	0	0	0	3	1
35	DF	(England) ENG	Reece Oxford	3	0	0+1	0	0	0	1+1	0

=== Goalscorers ===
Correct as of match played 13 May 2018

Rank	Pos	No.	Nat	Name	Premier League	FA Cup	League Cup	Total
1	MF	7	(Austria)	Marko Arnautović	11	0	0	11
2	ST	17	(Mexico)	Javier Hernández	8	0	0	8
3	ST	20	(Ghana)	André Ayew	3	0	3	6
4	MF	10	(Argentina)	Manuel Lanzini	5	0	0	5
5	ST	15	(Senegal)	Diafra Sakho	2	0	2	4
5	MF	16	(England)	Mark Noble	4	0	0	4
7	ST	9	(England)	Andy Carroll	3	0	0	3
7	DF	21	(Italy)	Angelo Ogbonna	1	0	2	3
7	MF	30	(England)	Michail Antonio	3	0	0	3
10	MF	8	(Senegal)	Cheikhou Kouyaté	2	0	0	2
10	MF	14	(Spain)	Pedro Obiang	2	0	0	2
10	MF	18	(Portugal)	João Mário	2	0	0	2
13	DF	3	(England)	Aaron Cresswell	1	0	0	1
13	DF	19	(Wales)	James Collins	1	0	0	1
13	DF	26	(France)	Arthur Masuaku	0	0	1	1
13	DF	32	(England)	Reece Burke	0	1	0	1
Totals					48	1	8	57
