= 2015–16 West Ham United F.C. season =

English football team season

West Ham United
2015–16 season
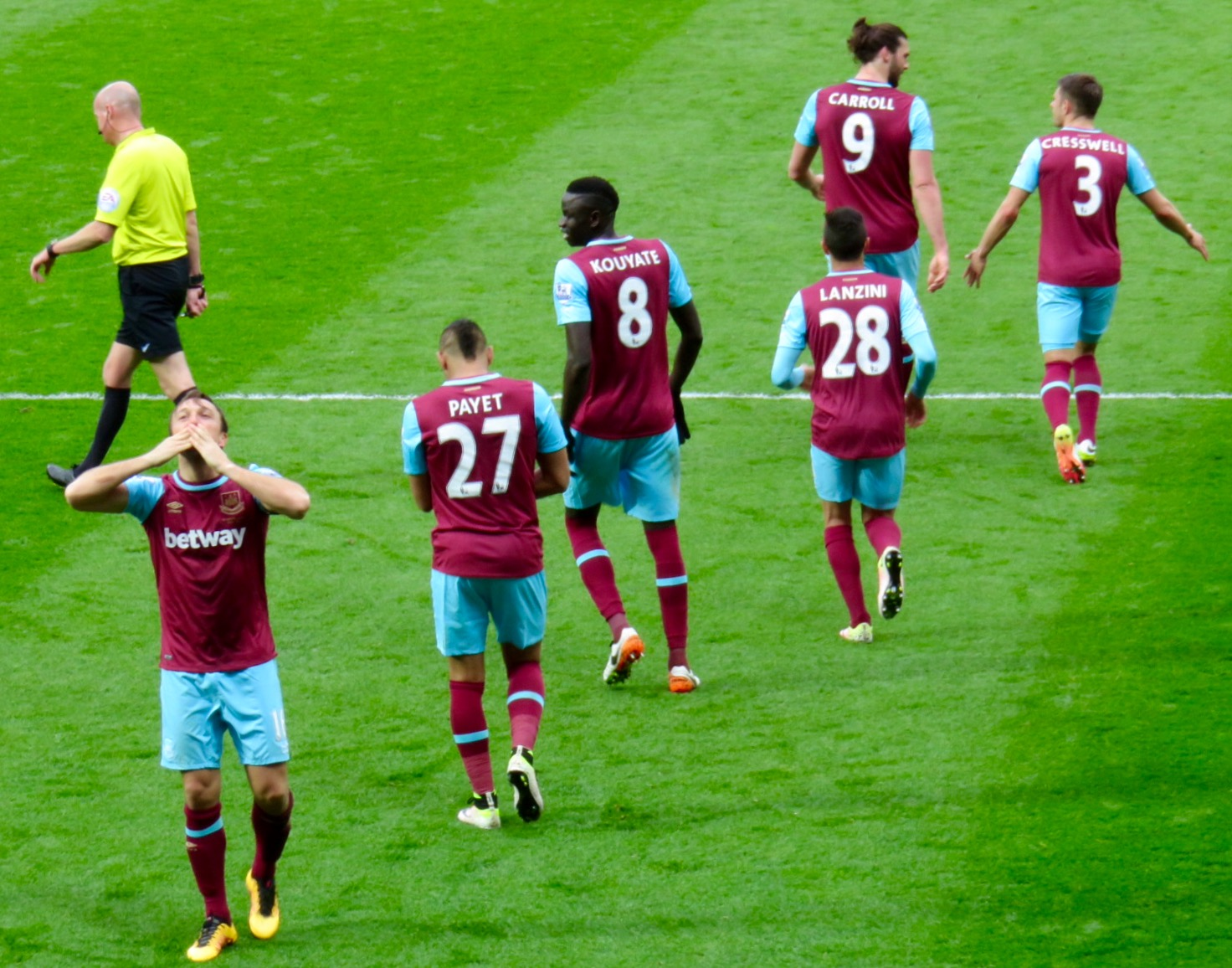
- Mark Noble celebrates scoring West Ham's third against West Bromwich Albion, April 2016
- Co-chairman: David Gold; David Sullivan
- Manager: Slaven Bilić
- Stadium: Boleyn Ground
- Premier League: 7th
- FA Cup: Sixth round
- League Cup: Third round
- UEFA Europa League: Third qualifying round
- Top goalscorer: League: Dimitri Payet; Andy Carroll (9 each); All: Dimitri Payet (12)
- Highest home attendance: 34,977 (v Bournemouth, 22 August 2015) (v Chelsea, 24 October 2015) (v Southampton, 28 December 2015) (v Liverpool, 2 January 2016) (v Manchester City, 23 January 2016) (v Tottenham Hotspur, 2 March 2016) (v Arsenal, 9 April 2016)
- Lowest home attendance: 33,048 (vs Birkirkara, 16 July 2015)
Home colours	Away colours	Third colours

The 2015–16 season was West Ham United's fourth campaign in the Premier League since being promoted in the 2011–12 season. It was West Ham's 20th Premier League campaign overall, their 58th appearance in the top division, and their 121st year in existence.

As well as competing in the Premier League, West Ham United took part in the FA Cup and League Cup, entering at the third round in both competitions. As a result of topping the fair play table last season, the club also qualified for this season's UEFA Europa League competition.

Slaven Bilić was the team's manager, replacing Sam Allardyce. Bilić was appointed on 9 June on a three-year contract. After Kevin Nolan left West Ham on 27 August 2015, Mark Noble was the current captain. It was their last season playing at the Boleyn Ground before moving to the Olympic Stadium for the start of the 2016–17 season. The Boleyn Ground was sold to the Galliard group in 2014. A new commemorative, first-team kit was introduced for the season inspired by the kit worn for West Ham's first season at the Boleyn Ground, the 1904–05 season.

West Ham finished the season in 7th place with 62 points, a record number for the team in the Premier League. Their top scorer was Dimitri Payet with 12 goals in all competitions.

== Key events ==
=== Pre-season ===
- 30 January 2015: Stephen Hendrie of Hamilton Academical signs a pre-contract agreement to join West Ham on 1 July 2015.
- 30 April 2015: West Ham announce Umbro as their new kit supplier from the start of the 2015–16 season after signing a five-year commercial agreement.
- 30 May 2015: Birmingham City's goalkeeper Darren Randolph is signed on a free transfer effective from 1 July 2015.
- 9 June 2015: West Ham appoint former Hammers defender, Slaven Bilić as manager on a three-year contract.
- 10 June 2015: West Ham announce the signing of Sampdoria midfielder Pedro Obiang for an undisclosed fee on a four-year deal.
- 17 June 2015: The fixtures for the season are announced with last game ever to be played at the Boleyn Ground scheduled to be against Swansea City.
- 20 June 2015: West Ham give a two-year contract to former Manchester City trainee Martin Samuelsen.
- 26 June 2015: West Ham sign France international midfielder Dimitri Payet from Marseille on a five-year contract in an undisclosed deal worth more than £10 million.
- 29 June 2015: West Ham legendary former full-back Julian Dicks joins the club's coaching staff.

=== Season ===
==== July ====
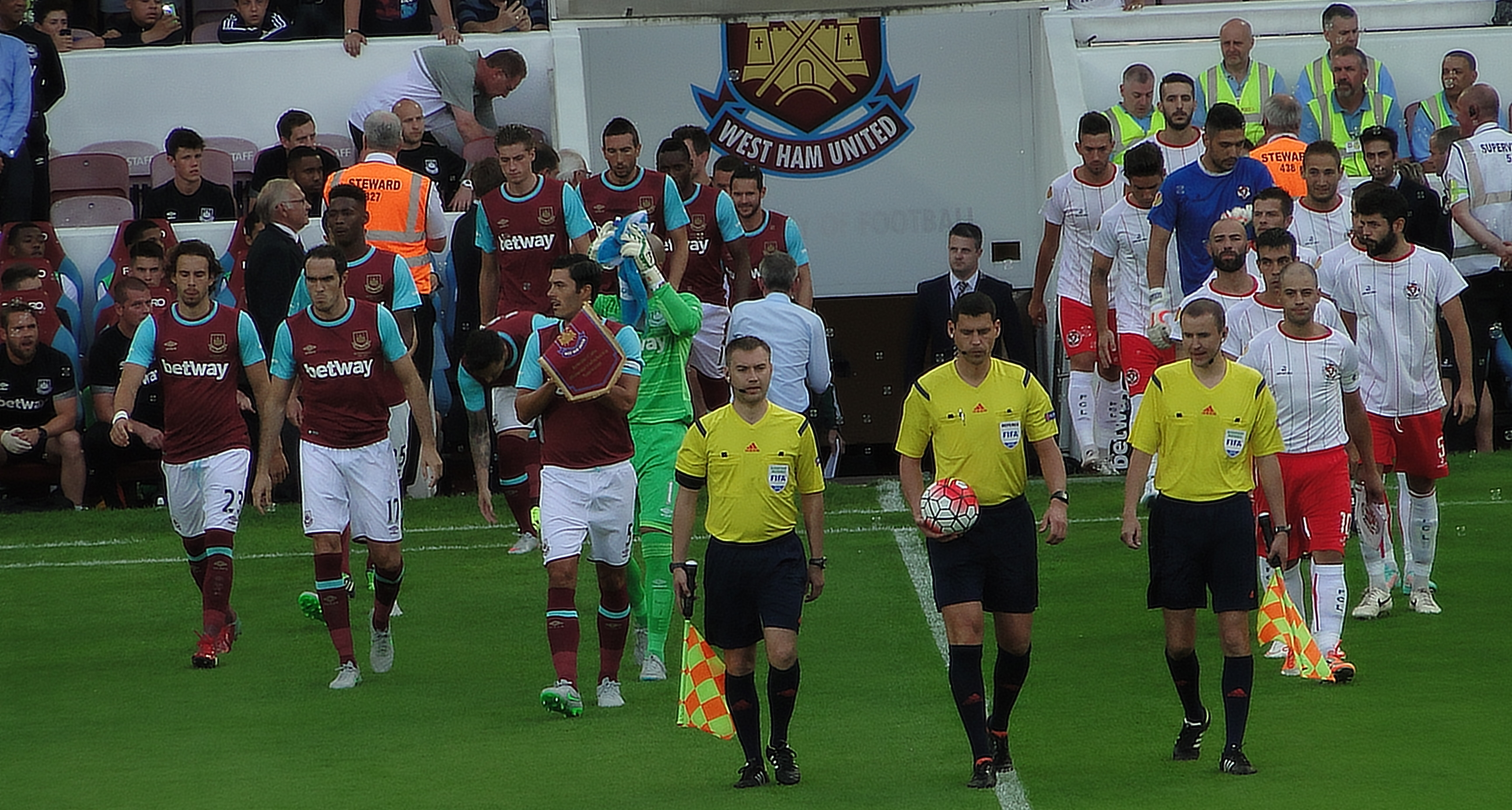
The players of West Ham and Lusitans before their game, 2 July 2015

- 2 July 2015: New West Ham manager Slaven Bilić does not take charge of the team for their opening Europa League qualifier leaving coaching duties to Academy coach, Terry Westley. West Ham won the game against Lusitanos 3–0 with two goals from Diafra Sakho and one from James Tomkins.
- 2 July 2015: 16 year-old development side player, Reece Oxford, plays against Lusitanos to become West Ham's youngest ever player.
- 10 July 2015: West Ham complete the signing of Juventus and Italy centre-back Angelo Ogbonna for €11 million.
- 14 July 2015: Defender Carl Jenkinson, signed on-loan in the 2014–15 season, returns for a 12-month loan from Arsenal.
- 16 July 2015: Winger Stewart Downing rejoins hometown club Middlesbrough on a four-year deal, stepping down a division from West Ham.
- 22 July 2015: West Ham sign former River Plate attacking midfielder Manuel Lanzini, known as "the jewel." He joined on a year-long loan from United Arab Emirates side Al Jazira with the option to make the move permanent.

==== August ====
- 6 August 2015: West Ham are knocked out of the Europa League in the third qualifying round by Romanian side, Astra Giurgiu 4–3 on aggregate.
- 9 August 2015: The Premier League season begins for West Ham with a 0–2 win against Arsenal at Emirates Stadium.
- 19 August 2015: West Ham United midfielder Diego Poyet joins Championship side Milton Keynes Dons on loan until the end of the season
- 20 August 2015: West Ham United centre-back Reece Burke joined League One side Bradford City on Youth Loan for an initial period until 20 September 2015.
- 23 August 2015: Striker Diafra Sakho is arrested and bailed on suspicion of making threats to kill and witness intimidation.
- 27 August 2015: Midfielder Kevin Nolan leaves by mutual consent.
- 28 August 2015: Striker Modibo Maïga joins Saudi Arabian club Al Nassr on a permanent basis for an undisclosed fee.
- 29 August 2015: With the 0–3 victory at Liverpool, West Ham win their first league match at Anfield since 1963.

==== September ====
- 1 September 2015: Barcelona midfielder Alex Song and Chelsea winger Victor Moses sign on season-long loans, with Hull City striker Nikica Jelavić also arriving for approximately £3 million on an initial two-year contract with an option for a further two years. Winger Michail Antonio signs from Nottingham Forest on a four-year contract, with an option for a further two years. Midfielder Matt Jarvis joins Norwich City on a season-long loan.
- 18 September 2015: Bradford City extend defender Reece Burke's loan stay at Valley Parade for a further month.

==== October ====
- 6 October 2015: Morgan Amalfitano is released by the club.
- 24 October 2015: West Ham defeat reigning Premier League champions Chelsea 2–1 at the Boleyn Ground with goals from Mauro Zárate and Andy Carroll.

==== November ====
- 10 November 2015: Midfielder Dimitri Payet suffered an injury to his left ankle during game with Everton. He was ruled out of action for three months. Payet picked up the injury following a crude challenge from Everton midfielder James McCarthy.
- 24 November 2015: Blackburn Rovers re-sign defender Doneil Henry on loan from West Ham United until 3 January.
- 25 November 2015: League One's Bradford City extend defender Reece Burke's youth loan deal from West Ham until 2 January.

==== December ====
- 4 December 2015: West Ham striker Diafra Sakho is set to be sidelined for three months with a thigh injury. Sakho suffered the injury against West Bromwich Albion and an examination has confirmed the extent of the problem.
- 8 December 2015: West Ham midfielder Manuel Lanzini could be out for up to six weeks with a thigh injury. The Argentine suffered the problem in training before a 0–0 draw at Manchester United.
- 10 December 2015: West Ham move to their new training ground months ahead of schedule to combat a growing injury list. The Rush Green site is unfinished but the pitches are in use. They will train there from 14 December. Due to relocate to their new Rush Green HQ at the start of next season, manager Slaven Bilić said they "can't continue to risk" using the pitches at their Chadwell Heath base. Winston Reid and Victor Moses join Dimitri Payet, Sakho and Lanzini on the sidelines. Reid and Moses are facing up to six weeks out with hamstring problems. Reid was injured during training, while Moses suffered his injury in a goalless draw at Manchester United.
- 24 December 2015: Winger Matt Jarvis signs a permanent deal with Norwich, to take effect in the January transfer window, for a reported fee of £2.5 million, having joined Norwich on loan in September.

==== January ====
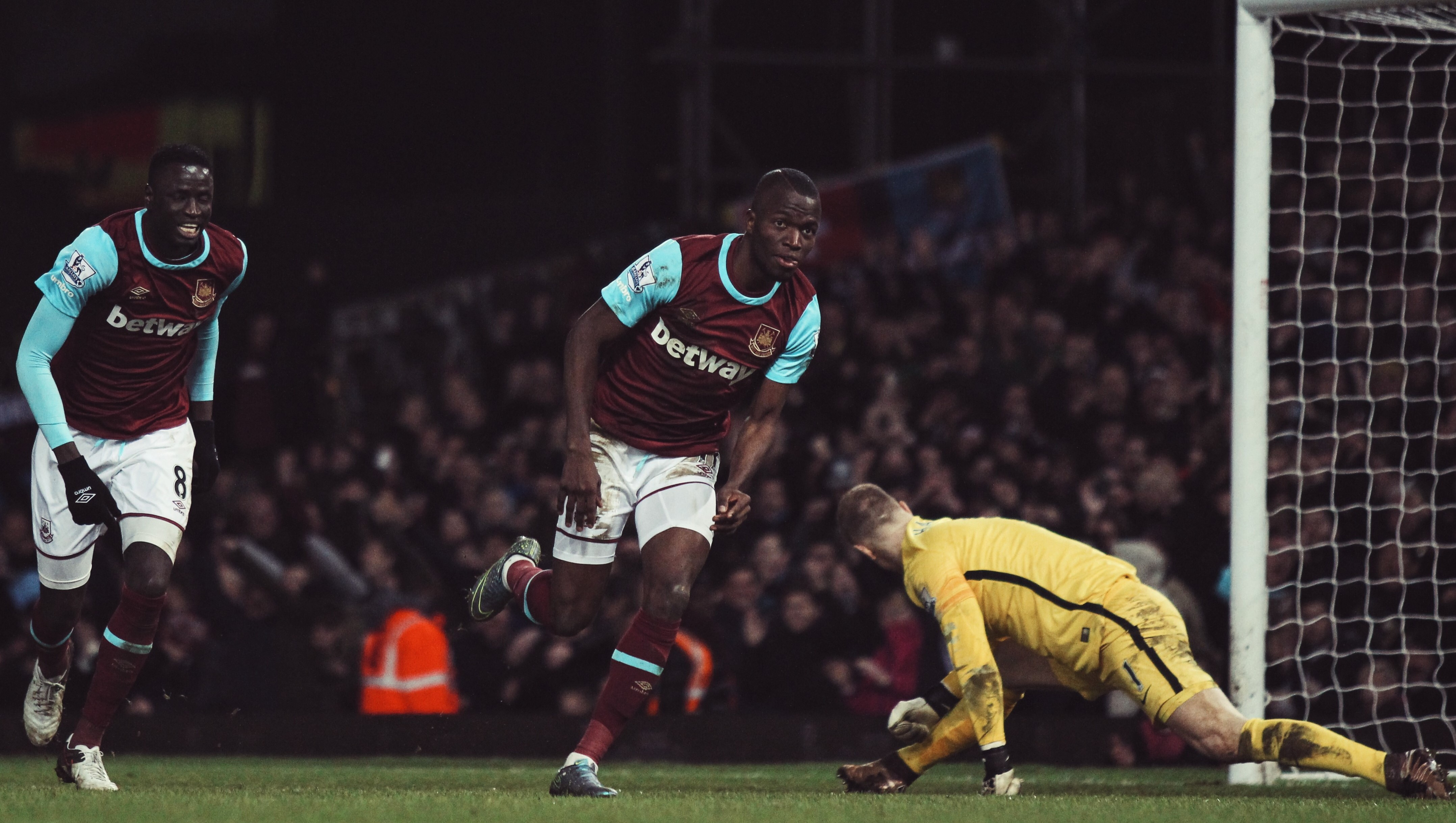
Enner Valencia scores past Joe Hart of Manchester City

- 2 January 2016: With a 2–0 home win West Ham complete their first league double over Liverpool for 52 years.
- 10 January 2016: Manuel Lanzini out for six weeks after the recurrence of a thigh injury. He was hurt in the 2–0 win over Liverpool on 2 January.
- 14 January 2016: Andy Carroll is ruled out for up to six weeks with a hamstring injury. He was substituted after 15 minutes in the Hammers' 3–1 win at AFC Bournemouth on 12 January.
- 20 January 2016: West Ham sign full-back Sam Byram from Leeds United for an undisclosed fee. He had been in talks with Everton, but instead signed a four-and-a-half-year deal with the Hammers.
- 21 January 2016: Striker Mauro Zárate moves to Italian club Fiorentina.

==== February ====
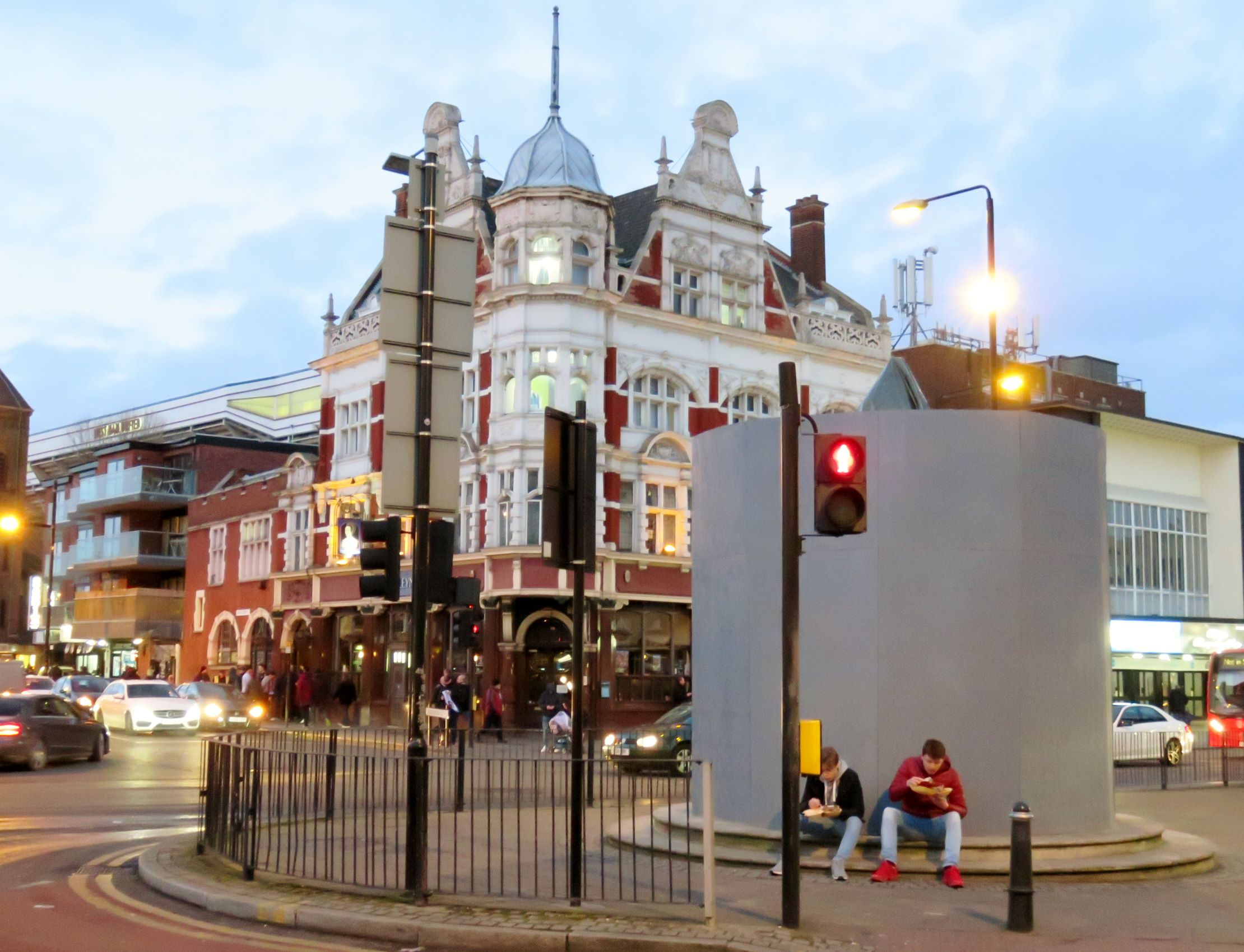
The World Cup Sculpture boarded-up for protection before the visit of Tottenham Hotspur on 2 March

- 9 February: Angelo Ogbonna scores his first goal for the club, an added-time winner against Liverpool in the fourth round of the FA Cup.
- 16 February: Forward, Nikica Jelavić signs for Chinese side Beijing Rehne.
- 21 February: West Ham reach the sixth round of the FA Cup after beating Blackburn Rovers 5–1 at Ewood Park with goals from Victor Moses, two from Dimitri Payet and two from Emmanuel Emenike, his first for the club.
- 27 February: Former manager Sam Allardyce returns to the Boleyn Ground for the first time with his Sunderland side. A single goal by Michail Antonio wins the game for West Ham.

==== March ====
- 2 March: West Ham beat London rivals Tottenham Hotspur 1–0 with a goal from Michail Antonio. The Champions Statue is boarded-up for protection and the match is marred by violence between the two sets of supporters with clashes on Green Street.

==== April ====
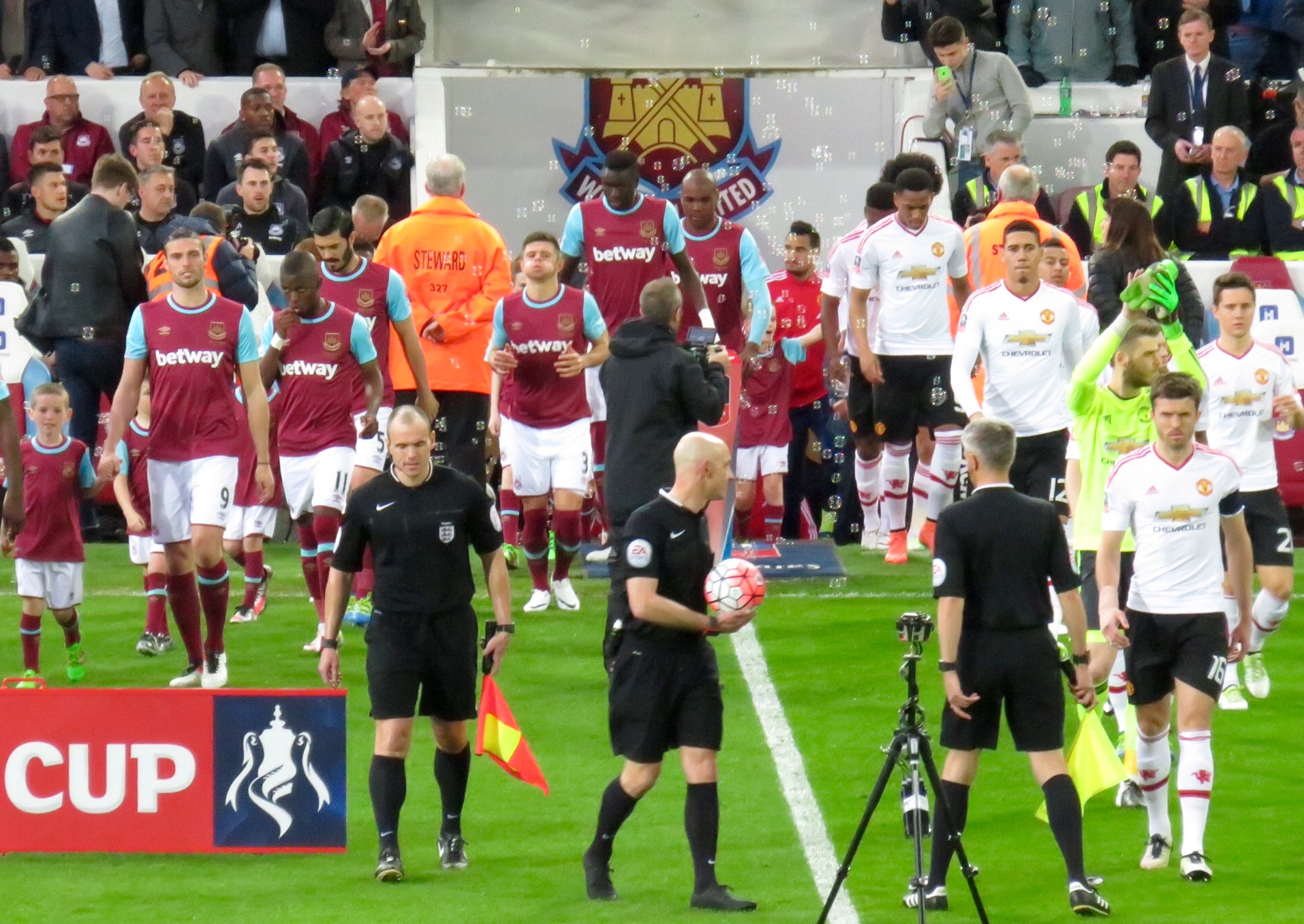
The players of West Ham and Manchester United entering the field for their FA Cup replay

- 9 April: Andy Carroll scores a hat-trick in eight minutes in a 3–3 home draw with Arsenal, his first for the club.
- 13 April: West Ham exit the FA Cup after being beaten 2–1 by Manchester United.
- 20 April: Carroll scores in three consecutive Premier League games for the first time in his career as West Ham beat Watford 3–1. West Ham set a record 15 games undefeated in the Premier League with the win.
- 22 April: Valencia striker Toni Martínez signs for West Ham on a three-year contract.
- 30 April: With a 3–0 win at West Brom, West Ham reach a record Premier League points total of 59.

==== May ====
- 4 May: The Development Squad win the 2015–16 Under-21 Premier League Cup after defeating Hull City 5–3 in a penalty shoot-out.
- 10 May: West Ham win their last home game at the Boleyn Ground against Manchester United 3–2, with Winston Reid scoring the last goal at the ground.

== Squad ==
=== First team squad ===
On 30 July 2015, West Ham announced new squad numbers for the 2015–16 season.

Squad No.	Name	Nationality	Position (s)	Date of birth (age)	Signed from
Goalkeepers
1	Darren Randolph	(Republic of Ireland)	GK	12 May 1987 (aged 29)	(England) Birmingham City
13	Adrián	(Spain)	GK	3 January 1987 (aged 29)	(Spain) Real Betis
34	Raphael Spiegel	(Switzerland)	GK	19 December 1992 (aged 23)	(Switzerland) Grasshopper
Defenders
2	Winston Reid	(New Zealand)	CB	3 July 1988 (aged 27)	(Denmark) Midtjylland
3	Aaron Cresswell	(England)	LB	15 December 1989 (aged 26)	(England) Ipswich Town
5	James Tomkins	(England)	CB	29 March 1989 (aged 27)	Academy
17	Joey O'Brien	(Republic of Ireland)	RB	17 February 1986 (aged 30)	(England) Bolton Wanderers
19	James Collins	(Wales)	CB	23 August 1983 (aged 32)	(England) Aston Villa
21	Angelo Ogbonna	(Italy)	CB	23 May 1988 (aged 27)	(Italy) Juventus
22	Sam Byram	(England)	RB	16 September 1993 (aged 22)	(England) Leeds United
25	Doneil Henry	(Canada)	CB	20 April 1993 (aged 23)	(Cyprus) Apollon Limassol
32	Reece Burke	(England)	CB	2 September 1996 (aged 19)	Academy
33	Stephen Hendrie	(Scotland)	LB	8 January 1995 (aged 21)	(Scotland) Hamilton Academical
Midfielders
4	Alex Song	(Cameroon)	DM	9 September 1987 (aged 28)	(Spain) Barcelona (loan)
8	Cheikhou Kouyaté	(Senegal)	DM	21 December 1989 (aged 26)	(Belgium) Anderlecht
14	Pedro Obiang	(Spain)	DM	27 March 1992 (aged 24)	(Italy) Sampdoria
16	Mark Noble	(England)	DM	8 May 1987 (aged 29)	Academy
20	Victor Moses	(Nigeria)	MF	12 December 1990 (aged 25)	(England) Chelsea (loan)
27	Dimitri Payet	(France)	CAM	29 March 1987 (aged 29)	(France) Marseille
28	Manuel Lanzini	(Argentina)	AM	15 February 1993 (aged 23)	(United Arab Emirates) Al Jazira (loan)
30	Michail Antonio	(England)	AM	28 March 1990 (aged 26)	(England) Nottingham Forest
35	Reece Oxford	(England)	CB/DM	16 December 1998 (aged 17)	Academy
Forwards
9	Andy Carroll	(England)	ST	6 January 1989 (aged 27)	(England) Liverpool
11	Enner Valencia	(Ecuador)	ST	4 November 1989 (aged 26)	(Mexico) Pachuca
15	Diafra Sakho	(Senegal)	ST	24 December 1989 (aged 26)	(France) Metz
29	Emmanuel Emenike	(Nigeria)	ST	10 May 1987 (aged 29)	(Turkey) Fenerbahçe (loan)

=== Squad statistics ===
As of 15 May 2016

No.	Pos.	Name	League		FA Cup		League Cup		Europa League		Total		Discipline	
No.	Pos.	Name	Apps	Goals	Apps	Goals	Apps	Goals	Apps	Goals	Apps	Goals	Yellow card	Red card
1	GK	(Republic of Ireland) Darren Randolph	6	-	6	-	–	-	3	-	15	–	-	-
2	DF	(New Zealand) Winston Reid	24	1	4	-	0+1	-	1	-	29+1	1	2	-
3	DF	(England) Aaron Cresswell	37	2	6	-	1	-	3	-	47	2	3	-
4	MF	(Cameroon) Alex Song	8+4	-	2+1	-	–	-	-	-	10+5	-	-	-
5	DF	(England) James Tomkins	23+2	-	2	1	1	-	4	2	30+2	3	4	1
8	MF	(Senegal) Cheikhou Kouyaté	34	5	5		0+1	-	2	-	41+1	5	3	2
9	FW	(England) Andy Carroll	13+14	9	2+2	-	1	-	-	-	16+16	9	-	-
10	FW	(Argentina) Mauro Zárate	9+6	3	1	-	1	1	4	1	15+6	5	2	-
11	FW	(Ecuador) Enner Valencia	10+9	4	3+1	-	-	–	1	1	14+10	5	-	-
12	DF	(England) Carl Jenkinson	13+7	2	1	-	1	-	1	-	16+7	2	3	1
13	GK	(Spain) Adrián	32	-	-	-	1	-	3	-	36	-	-	1
14	MF	(Spain) Pedro Obiang	11+13	-	4+1	-	1	-	–	-	16+14	-	2	-
15	FW	(Senegal) Diafra Sakho	18+3	5	0+1	-	-	–	2	2	20+4	7	1	1
16	MF	(England) Mark Noble	37	7	5	-	1	-	3	-	46	7	6	1 (Note: Noble's red card for a tackle on Liverpool's Danny Ings was rescinded.)
17	DF	(Republic of Ireland) Joey O'Brien	–	-	1+1	–	-	–	5	-	6+1	-	3	-
19	DF	(Wales) James Collins	16+3	-	2+1	-	1	-	2	-	20+4	-	3	2
20	ST	(Senegal) Modibo Maiga	3	1	-	-	-	-	-	-	3	1	-	-
20	MF	(Nigeria) Victor Moses	13+8	1	2+2	1	1	-	-	-	16+10	2	-	-
21	DF	(Italy) Angelo Ogbonna	27+1	-	5	1	–	-	1	-	33+1	1	2	-
22	DF	(England) Sam Byram	2+2	-	-	–	-	–	-	-	2+2	-	3	-
25	DF	(Canada) Doneil Henry	-	-	-	–	-	–	1	-	1	-	-	-
26	ST	(Croatia) Nikica Jelavić	1+12	1	1+1	1	-	–	-	-	2+13	2	1	-
27	MF	(France) Dimitri Payet	29+1	9	5+1	3	0+1	-	1	-	35+3	12	2	-
28	MF	(Argentina) Manuel Lanzini	23+3	6	2+1	-	1	-	1	1	27+4	7	2	-
29	ST	(Nigeria) Emmanuel Emenike	5+8	-	2+1	2	-	-	-	-	7+9	2	-	-
30	MF	(England) Michail Antonio	23+3	8	5+1	1	-	–	-	–	28+4	9	-	-
35	DF	(England) Reece Oxford	3+4	-	0+2	–	-	–	3	-	6+6	-	1	-
37	DF	(England) Lewis Page	–	-	–	-	-	-	3	-	3	-	-	-
39	MF	(Republic of Ireland) Josh Cullen	0+1	-	-	–	-	–	2+1	-	2+2	-	2	-
40	FW	(England) Djair Parfitt-Williams	-	-	-	–	-	–	0+2	-	0+2	-	-	-
51	FW	(England) Jordan Brown	-	–	-	-	-	–	0+1	-	0+1	-	-	-
59	DF	(England) Kyle Knoyle	–	-	-	–	-	–	1	-	1	-	-	-
62	DF	(England) Amos Nasha	–	–	–	-	-	–	0+1	-	0+1	-	-	-
66	DF	(England) Alex Pike	–	-	-	–	-	–	0+1	-	0+1	-	-	-

=== Goalscorers ===
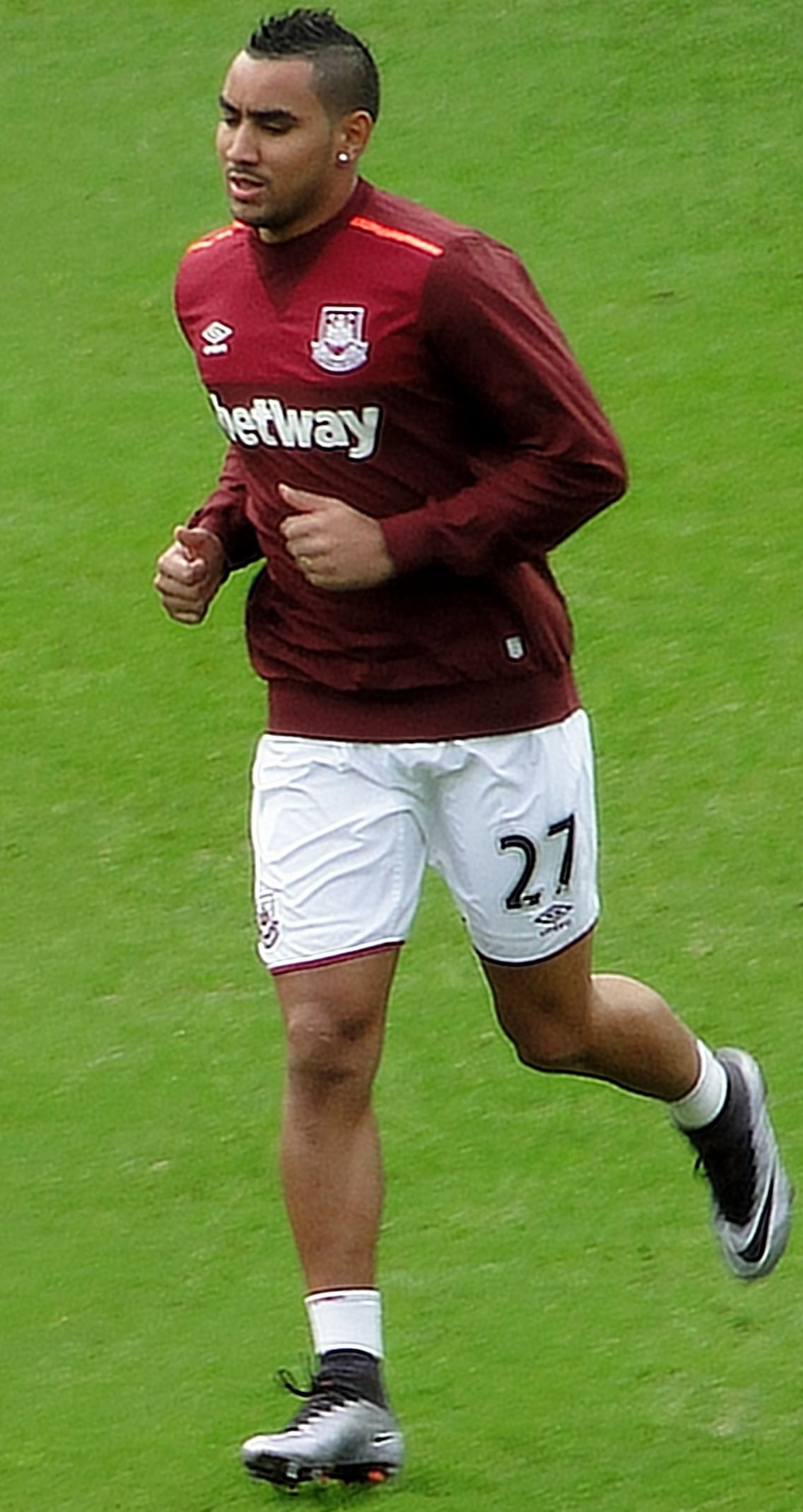
Dimitri Payet was West Ham's top goalscorer, netting nine league goals (twelve in all competitions).

As of 12 May 2016

Rank	Pos	No.	Nat	Name	Premier League	FA Cup	League Cup	UEFA Europa League	Total
1	MF	27	(France)	Dimitri Payet	9	3			12
2	FW	9	(England)	Andy Carroll	9				9
3	MF	30	(England)	Michail Antonio	7	1			8
4	FW	15	(Senegal)	Diafra Sakho	5			2	7
4	MF	16	(England)	Mark Noble	7				7
4	MF	28	(Argentina)	Manuel Lanzini	6			1	7
7	MF	8	(Senegal)	Cheikhou Kouyaté	5				5
7	FW	10	(Argentina)	Mauro Zárate	3		1	1	5
7	FW	11	(Ecuador)	Enner Valencia	4			1	5
10	DF	5	(England)	James Tomkins		1		2	3
11	DF	3	(England)	Aaron Cresswell	2				2
11	DF	12	(England)	Carl Jenkinson	2				2
11	FW	20	(Nigeria)	Victor Moses	1	1			2
11	FW	29	(Nigeria)	Emmanuel Emenike		2			2
11	FW	26	(Croatia)	Nikica Jelavić	1	1			2
16	DF	2	(New Zealand)	Winston Reid	1				1
16	FW	20	(Mali)	Modibo Maïga	1				1
16	DF	21	(Italy)	Angelo Ogbonna		1			1
16	FW	36	(England)	Elliot Lee				1	1
16	Own goals				1				1
TOTALS					64	10	1	8	83

== Coaching staff ==
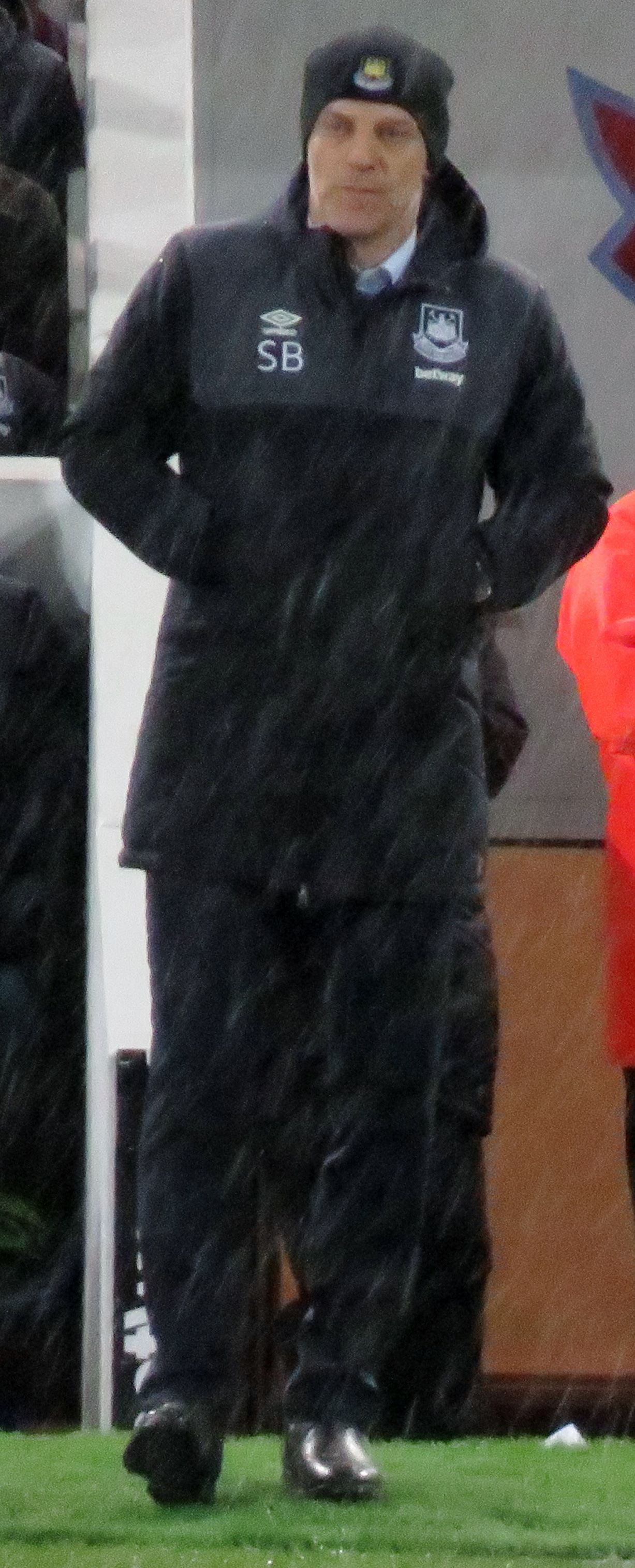
Slaven Bilić

Manager	(Croatia) Slaven Bilić
Assistant manager	(Croatia) Nikola Jurčević
First team coach	(England) Julian Dicks
First team coach	(Croatia) Edin Terzić
Goalkeeping coach	(England) Chris Woods
Development coach	(England) Steve Potts
Fitness coach	(England) Eamon Swift
Fitness coach	(Croatia) Miljenko Rak
Club Ambassador	(England) Tony Carr MBE
Academy Manager & Head of Coaching and Player Development	(England) Terry Westley
Head of Medical & Sports Science	(Belgium) Stijn Vandenbroucke
Head Physiotherapist	(England) Dominic Rogan
Chief Scout & Director of Recruitment	(England) Tony Henry

Last updated: 8 August 2015

== Pre-season ==
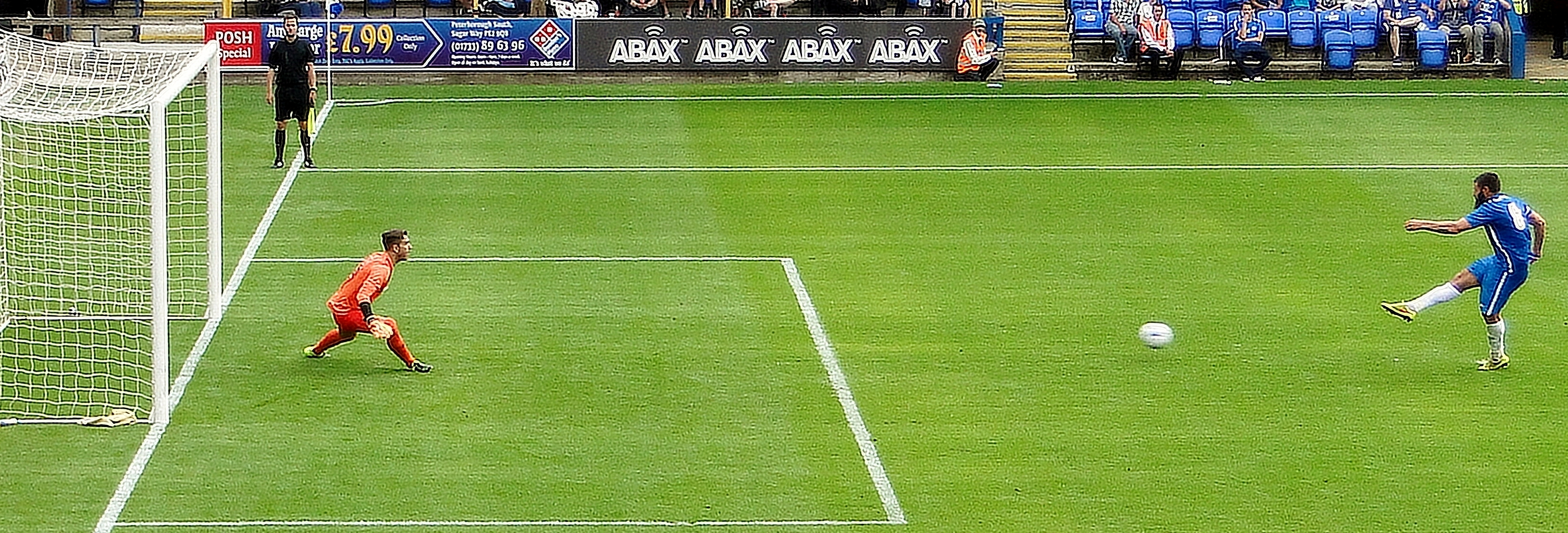
Michael Bostwick scores Peterborough United's third goal in their friendly on 11 July

Win Draw Loss

On 6 June 2015, West Ham announced their pre-season friendlies. Two days later, the club confirmed a further two friendlies. On 26 June 2015, the Hammers confirmed they would host Werder Bremen on 2 August 2015.

11 July 2015 Friendly	Peterborough United	3–3	West Ham United	Peterborough
15:00 BST	Santos 8'; Taylor 39'; Bostwick 60' (pen.)	Report	Noble 12'; Sakho 13'; Samuelsen 23'	Stadium: London Road; Attendance: 3,916

18 July 2015 Friendly	Southend United	2–3	West Ham United	Southend-on-Sea
15:00 BST	Hurst 20'; Payne 41'	Report	Payet 26' 30'; Prosser 56' (o.g.)	Stadium: Roots Hall

21 July 2015 Friendly	Colchester United	1–0	West Ham United XI	Colchester
19:45 BST	Moncur 13'	Report		Stadium: Colchester Community Stadium; Attendance: 6,650 (2485 away); Referee: Tim Robinson

25 July 2015 Friendly	Charlton Athletic	0–0	West Ham United	Charlton
15:00 BST		Report		Stadium: The Valley; Attendance: 8,678; Referee: Kevin Friend

28 July 2015 Friendly	Norwich City	0–1	West Ham United	Norwich
19:45 BST		Report	Toffolo 82' (o.g.)	Stadium: Carrow Road; Attendance: 20,130; Referee: Kevin Friend

2 August 2015 Betway Cup	West Ham United	1–2	Werder Bremen	London
15:00 BST	Sakho 19'	Report	Ujah 20', 31'	Stadium: Boleyn Ground; Attendance: 9,919; Referee: Graham Scott

== Competitions ==
=== Premier League ===
==== Matches ====
On 17 June 2015, the fixtures for the forthcoming season were announced.

9 August 2015 1	Arsenal	0–2	West Ham United	London
13:30 BST	Monreal (yellow card) 69'	Report	Noble (yellow card) 5'; Ogbonna (yellow card) 7'; Tomkins (yellow card) 37'; Kouyaté 43'; Zárate 57'	Stadium: Emirates Stadium; Attendance: 59,996; Referee: Martin Atkinson

15 August 2015 2	West Ham United	1–2	Leicester City	London
15:00 BST	Jenkinson (yellow card) 40'; Payet 55'; Adrián (red card) 90+2'	Report	Vardy (yellow card) 11'; Okazaki 27', (yellow card) 54'; Mahrez 38'; Benalouane (yellow card) 88'	Stadium: Boleyn Ground; Attendance: 34,857; Referee: Anthony Taylor

22 August 2015 3	West Ham United	3–4	AFC Bournemouth	London
15:00 BST	Noble 48' (pen.); Kouyaté 53'; Jenkinson (red card) 79'; Maïga 82'	Report	Wilson 11', 28', 79' (pen.); Pugh 66'; Boruc (yellow card) 75'	Stadium: Boleyn Ground; Attendance: 34,977; Referee: Jonathan Moss

29 August 2015 4	Liverpool	0–3	West Ham United	Liverpool
15:00 BST	Coutinho (yellow card) 45+4' (yellow-red card) 52'; Lucas (yellow card) 70'; Ings (yellow card) 86'; Clyne (yellow card) 90+1'	Report	Lanzini 3', (yellow card) 81'; Noble 29', (yellow card) 38' (yellow-red card) 79' (Note: Noble's red card for a tackle on Liverpool's Danny Ings later rescinded.); Sakho 90+2'	Stadium: Anfield; Attendance: 43,680; Referee: Kevin Friend

14 September 2015 5	West Ham United	2–0	Newcastle United	London
20:00 BST	Payet 9', 48'	Report	Colback (yellow card) 30'; Janmaat (yellow card) 57'	Stadium: Boleyn Ground; Attendance: 34,907; Referee: Anthony Taylor

19 September 2015 6	Manchester City	1–2	West Ham United	Manchester
17:30 BST	De Bruyne 45'; Kolarov (yellow card) 54'	Report	Moses 6'; Lanzini (yellow card) 22'; Sakho 31'; Obiang (yellow card) 45'	Stadium: City of Manchester Stadium; Attendance: 53,545; Referee: Robert Madley

26 September 2015 7	West Ham United	2–2	Norwich City	London
15:00 BST	Sakho 33'; Kouyaté 90+3'	Report	Brady 9'; Redmond 83'	Stadium: Boleyn Ground; Attendance: 34,857; Referee: Mike Dean

3 October 2015 8	Sunderland	2–2	West Ham United	Sunderland
15:00 BST	Fletcher 10'; Lens 22', (yellow card) 32' (yellow-red card) 56'; Cattermole (yellow card) 43'; Coates (yellow card) 74'	Report	Noble (yellow card) 2'; Reid (yellow card) 24'; Cresswell (yellow card) 36'; Jenkinson 45+1', (yellow card) 72'; Payet 60'	Stadium: Stadium of Light; Attendance: 42,932; Referee: Neil Swarbrick

17 October 2015 9	Crystal Palace	1–3	West Ham United	London
15:00 BST	Cabaye 25' (pen.); Gayle (yellow card) 32' (yellow-red card) 44'; Jedinak (yellow card) 69'	Report	Tomkins (yellow card) 21'; Jenkinson 22'; Lanzini 88'; Jelavić (yellow card) 90+3'; Payet (yellow card) 40', (goal) 90+4'	Stadium: Selhurst Park; Attendance: 24,812; Referee: Mark Clattenburg

24 October 2015 10	West Ham United	2–1	Chelsea	London
15:00 BST	Zárate 17'; Kouyaté (yellow card) 74'; Carroll 79'	Report	Azpilicueta (yellow card) 24'; Matić (yellow card) 35' (yellow-red card) 45'; Costa (yellow card) 45'; Fàbregas (yellow card) 45'; Cahill 56'; Willian (yellow card) 82'; Mikel (yellow card) 90'	Stadium: Boleyn Ground; Attendance: 34,977; Referee: Jonathan Moss

31 October 2015 11	Watford	2–0	West Ham United	Watford
15:00 GMT	Ighalo 39', 48'; Nyom (yellow card) 66'; Aké (yellow card) 81'; Capoue (yellow card) 85'	Report	Collins (red card) 84'; Tomkins (yellow card) 85'	Stadium: Vicarage Road; Attendance: 20,598; Referee: Keith Stroud

7 November 2015 12	West Ham United	1–1	Everton	London
15:00 GMT	Lanzini 30'; Zárate (yellow card) 90'	Report	McCarthy (yellow card) 34'; Lukaku 43'; Funes Mori (yellow card) 59'	Stadium: Boleyn Ground; Attendance: 34,977; Referee: Paul Tierney

22 November 2015 13	Tottenham Hotspur	4–1	West Ham United	London
16:00 GMT	Kane 23', 50'; Alderweireld 33'; Alli (yellow card) 67'; Walker (yellow card) 75', (goal) 83'	Report	Sakho (yellow card) 67'; Noble (yellow card) 75'; Lanzini 87'	Stadium: White Hart Lane; Attendance: 35,968; Referee: Anthony Taylor

29 November 2015 14	West Ham United	1–1	West Bromwich Albion	London
14:05 GMT	Zárate 17'	Report	Olsson (yellow card) 17'; Reid 50' (o.g.); Yacob (yellow card) 82'	Stadium: Boleyn Ground; Attendance: 34,914; Referee: Martin Atkinson

5 December 2015 15	Manchester United	0–0	West Ham United	Manchester
15:00 GMT	Carrick (yellow card) 85'	Report		Stadium: Old Trafford; Attendance: 75,350; Referee: Mark Clattenburg

12 December 2015 16	West Ham United	0–0	Stoke City	London
	Kouyaté (yellow card) 67'	Report	Pieters (yellow card) 37'; Afellay (yellow card) 63'	Stadium: Boleyn Ground; Attendance: 34,857; Referee: Andre Marriner

20 December 2015 17	Swansea City	0–0	West Ham United	Swansea
16:00 GMT		Report	Jenkinson (yellow card) 85'	Stadium: Liberty Stadium; Attendance: 20,661; Referee: Lee Mason

26 December 2015 18	Aston Villa	1–1	West Ham United	Birmingham
15:00 GMT	Bacuna (yellow card) 12'; Ayew 62' (pen.); Hutton (yellow card) 78'; Lescott (yellow card) 90'	Report	Ogbonna (yellow card) 13'; Cresswell 45'; Collins (yellow card) 58'; Kouyaté (yellow card) 74'	Stadium: Villa Park; Attendance: 38,193; Referee: Mike Dean

28 December 2015 19	West Ham United	2–1	Southampton	London
17:30 GMT	Tomkins (yellow card) 58'; Antonio 69'; Carroll 79'	Report	Jenkinson 13' (o.g.); Martina (yellow card) 52'; Romeu (yellow card) 56'; Bertrand (yellow card) 66'	Stadium: Boleyn Ground; Attendance: 34,977; Referee: Michael Oliver

2 January 2016 20	West Ham United	2–0	Liverpool	London
12:45 GMT	Antonio 10'; Lanzini (yellow card) 18'; Carroll 55'	Report	Lucas (yellow card) 24'	Stadium: Boleyn Ground; Attendance: 34,977; Referee: Robert Madley

12 January 2016 21	Bournemouth	1–3	West Ham United	Bournemouth
19:45 GMT	Arter 17'; Smith (yellow card) 66'	Report	Payet (yellow card) 68' (goal) 67'; Valencia 74', 84'	Stadium: Dean Court; Attendance: 11,071; Referee: Martin Atkinson

16 January 2016 22	Newcastle United	2–1	West Ham United	Newcastle upon Tyne
15:00 GMT	Pérez 6'; Wijnaldum 15'; Elliot (yellow card) 90+1'	Report	Jelavić 49'	Stadium: St James' Park; Attendance: 50,031; Referee: Neil Swarbrick

23 January 2016 23	West Ham United	2–2	Manchester City	London
17:30 GMT	Valencia 1', 56'; Noble (yellow card) 39'; Byram (yellow card) 70'	Report	Agüero 9' (pen.), 81'; Demichelis (yellow card) 32'; Touré (yellow card) 89'; Fernando (yellow card) 90+4'	Stadium: Boleyn Ground; Attendance: 34,977; Referee: Craig Pawson

2 February 2016 24	West Ham United	2–0	Aston Villa	London
19:45 GMT	Song (yellow card) 48'; Antonio 58'; Collins (yellow card) 67'; Noble (yellow card) 69'; Kouyaté 85'	Report	Ayew (red card) 17'	Stadium: Boleyn Ground; Attendance: 34,914; Referee: Jonathan Moss

6 February 2016 25	Southampton	1–0	West Ham United	Southampton
17:30 GMT	Yoshida 9'; Wanyama (red card) 54'; Clasie (yellow card) 83'	Report	Valencia (yellow card) 67'; Byram (yellow card) 87'	Stadium: St Mary's Stadium; Attendance: 29,161; Referee: Mark Clattenburg

13 February 2016 26	Norwich City	2–2	West Ham United	Norwich
15:00 GMT	Naismith (yellow card) 32'; Brady 54'; Hoolahan 65'; Howson (yellow card) 90'	Report	Collins (yellow card) 22'; Obiang (yellow card) 31'; Payet 74'; Noble 76'	Stadium: Carrow Road; Attendance: 27,101; Referee: Mike Jones

27 February 2016 27	West Ham United	1–0	Sunderland	London
12:45 GMT	Antonio 30'; Byram (yellow card) 71'	Report		Stadium: Boleyn Ground; Attendance: 34,946; Referee: Mike Dean

2 March 2016 28	West Ham United	1–0	Tottenham Hotspur	London
19:45 GMT	Antonio 7'	Report	Alderweireld (yellow card) 30'; Wimmer (yellow card) 41'; Davies (yellow card) 65'	Stadium: Boleyn Ground; Attendance: 34,977; Referee: Andre Marriner

5 March 2016 29	Everton	2–3	West Ham United	Liverpool
15:00 GMT	Lukaku 13'; Mirallas (yellow card) 16' (yellow-red card) 34'; Lennon 56'; Joel (yellow card) 75'; Barkley (yellow card) 90+3'	Report	Antonio (yellow card) 37', (goal) 78'; Sakho 81', (yellow card) 90+1'; Ogbonna (yellow card) 80'; Payet 90'	Stadium: Goodison Park; Attendance: 39,000; Referee: Anthony Taylor

19 March 2016 30	Chelsea	2–2	West Ham United	London
15:00 GMT	Fàbregas 45+3', 89' (pen.)	Report	Lanzini 17'; Carroll 61'	Stadium: Stamford Bridge; Attendance: 41,623; Referee: Robert Madley

2 April 2016 31	West Ham United	2–2	Crystal Palace	London
15:00 BST	Lanzini 18'; Payet 41'; Kouyaté (red card) 67'	Report	Delaney 15'; Gayle 75'	Stadium: Boleyn Ground; Attendance: 34,857; Referee: Mark Clattenburg

9 April 2016 32	West Ham United	3–3	Arsenal	London
12:45 BST	Carroll 44', 45+2', 52'	Report	Özil 18'; Sánchez 35'; Koscielny 70'	Stadium: Boleyn Ground; Attendance: 34,977; Referee: Craig Pawson

17 April 2016 33	Leicester City	2–2	West Ham United	Leicester
13:30 BST	Vardy 18', (yellow card) 28' (yellow-red card) 56'; Ulloa 90+5' (pen.)	Report	Carroll 84' (pen.); Cresswell 86'	Stadium: King Power Stadium; Attendance: 32,104; Referee: Jonathan Moss

20 April 2016 34	West Ham United	3–1	Watford	London
19:45 BST	Carroll 11'; Noble 45' (pen.), 53' (pen.)	Report	Prödl (yellow card) 22', (goal) 64'; Suárez (yellow card) 71'; Amrabat (yellow card) 76' (yellow-red card) 90+3'	Stadium: Boleyn Ground; Attendance: 34,857; Referee: Mike Dean

30 April 2016 35	West Bromwich Albion	0–3	West Ham United	West Bromwich
15:00 BST		Report	Kouyaté 34'; Noble 45+2', 79'	Stadium: The Hawthorns; Attendance: 25,031; Referee: Lee Mason

7 May 2016 36	West Ham United	1–4	Swansea City	London
15:00 BST	Kingsley 68' (o.g.); Sakho (yellow card) 72'; Reid (yellow card) 81'; Ogbonna (yellow card) 85'	Report	Routledge 25'; Ayew 31'; Ki 51'; Gomis 90+3'	Stadium: Boleyn Ground; Attendance: 34,907; Referee: Michael Oliver

10 May 2016 37	West Ham United	3–2	Manchester United	London
20:30 BST	Sakho 10'; Carroll (yellow card) 69'; Antonio 76'; Reid 80'	Report	Martial 51', 72', (yellow card) 58'; Valencia (yellow card) 70'; Herrera (yellow card) 75'	Stadium: Boleyn Ground; Attendance: 34,602; Referee: Mike Dean

15 May 2016 38	Stoke City	2–1	West Ham United	Stoke-on-Trent
15:00 BST	Imbula (yellow card) 40', (goal) 55'; Diouf 88', (yellow card) 89'; Given (yellow card) 90+4'	Report	Kouyaté (yellow card) 20'; Antonio 23'	Stadium: Britannia Stadium; Attendance: 27,721; Referee: Mike Jones

==== League table ====
Pos	Team	Pld	W	D	L	GF	GA	GD	Pts	Qualification or relegation
5	Manchester United	38	19	9	10	49	35	+14	66	Qualification for the Europa League group stage (Note: Manchester United qualified for the Europa League group stage by winning the 2015–16 FA Cup. As they had also qualified by their virtue of their league position (5th), this spot was passed to the next-highest ranked team (6th), Southampton.)
6	Southampton	38	18	9	11	59	41	+18	63	Qualification for the Europa League group stage
7	West Ham United	38	16	14	8	65	51	+14	62	Qualification for the Europa League third qualifying round (Note: Manchester City qualified for the Europa League third qualifying round by winning the 2015–16 Football League Cup. However, since they already qualified for European competition based on their league position, the spot awarded to the League Cup winners was passed to the next best-placed team (seventh-placed West Ham United).)
8	Liverpool	38	16	12	10	63	50	+13	60	
9	Stoke City	38	14	9	15	41	55	−14	51	

Source: Barclays Premier League
Rules for classification: 1) Points; 2) Goal difference; 3) Goals scored; 4) Play-offs (only if needed to decide champion, teams for relegation or teams for UEFA competitions).

==== Results summary ====
Overall								Home						Away					
Pld	W	D	L	GF	GA	GD	Pts	W	D	L	GF	GA	GD	W	D	L	GF	GA	GD
38	16	14	8	65	51	+14	62	9	7	3	34	26	+8	7	7	5	31	25	+6

Last updated: 15 May 2016.
Source: Premier League

==== Results by matchday ====
Matchday	1	2	3	4	5	6	7	8	9	10	11	12	13	14	15	16	17	18	19	20	21	22	23	24	25	26	27	28	29	30	31	32	33	34	35	36	37	38
Ground	A	H	H	A	H	A	H	A	A	H	A	H	A	H	A	H	A	A	H	H	A	A	H	H	A	A	H	H	A	A	H	H	A	H	A	H	H	A
Result	W	L	L	W	W	W	D	D	W	W	L	D	L	D	D	D	D	D	W	W	W	L	D	W	L	D	W	W	W	D	D	D	D	W	W	L	W	L
Position	3	7	9	7	5	2	3	5	4	3	5	5	6	8	6	8	8	10	7	6	5	5	6	6	6	7	6	6	5	5	5	6	6	6	5	6	6	7

Updated to match(es) played on 15 May 2016. Source: Statto
A = Away; H = Home; W = Win; D = Draw; L = Loss

=== Football League Cup ===
West Ham did not enter until the third round along with the seven other teams who qualified for European competition. They were Manchester City, Arsenal, Manchester United, Tottenham, Liverpool, Southampton and Chelsea.

22 September 2015 Third round	Leicester City	2–1	West Ham United	Leicester
19:45 BST	Dodoo 6'; Fuchs (yellow card) 35'; Simpson (yellow card) 69'; Schlupp (yellow card) 79'; Wasilewski (yellow card) 108'; King 116'	Report	Zárate 27' (yellow card) 59'; Obiang (yellow card) 67'; Noble (yellow card) 100'	Stadium: King Power Stadium; Attendance: 21,268; Referee: Peter Bankes

=== FA Cup ===
9 January 2016 Third round	West Ham United	1–0	Wolverhampton Wanderers	London
15:00 GMT	Jelavić 84'	Report		Stadium: Boleyn Ground; Attendance: 34,547; Referee: Anthony Taylor

30 January 2016 Fourth round	Liverpool	0–0	West Ham United	Liverpool
17:30 GMT	Lovren (yellow card) 54'	Report		Stadium: Anfield; Attendance: 44,006; Referee: Martin Atkinson

9 February 2016 Replay	West Ham United	2–1 (a.e.t.)	Liverpool	London
19:45 GMT	Antonio 45', (yellow card) 87'; Ogbonna 120+1'	Report	Stewart (yellow card) 26'; Coutinho 48'	Stadium: Boleyn Ground; Attendance: 34,433; Referee: Roger East

21 February 2016 Fifth round	Blackburn Rovers	1–5	West Ham United	Blackburn
14:00 GMT	Marshall 20'; Taylor (yellow card) 35' (yellow-red card) 55'; Lenihan (yellow card) 84'	Report	Moses 26'; Payet 36', 90+2'; Emenike 64', 85'; Kouyaté (red card) 75'	Stadium: Ewood Park; Attendance: 18,793; Referee: Jonathan Moss

13 March 2016 Sixth round	Manchester United	1–1	West Ham United	Manchester
16:00 GMT	Fellaini (yellow card) 32'; Carrick (yellow card) 71'; Martial 83'	Report	Reid (yellow card) 3'; Payet (yellow card) 55', (goal) 68'; Kouyaté (yellow card) 58'; Antonio (yellow card) 79'	Stadium: Old Trafford; Attendance: 74,298; Referee: Martin Atkinson

13 April 2016 Replay	West Ham United	1–2	Manchester United	London
19:00 BST	Carroll (yellow card) 45+2'; Tomkins 79'	Report	Carrick (yellow card) 26'; Rojo (yellow card) 45+2'; Rashford 54'; Fellaini 67'; Herrera (yellow card) 74'	Stadium: Boleyn Ground; Attendance: 33,505; Referee: Roger East

=== UEFA Europa League ===
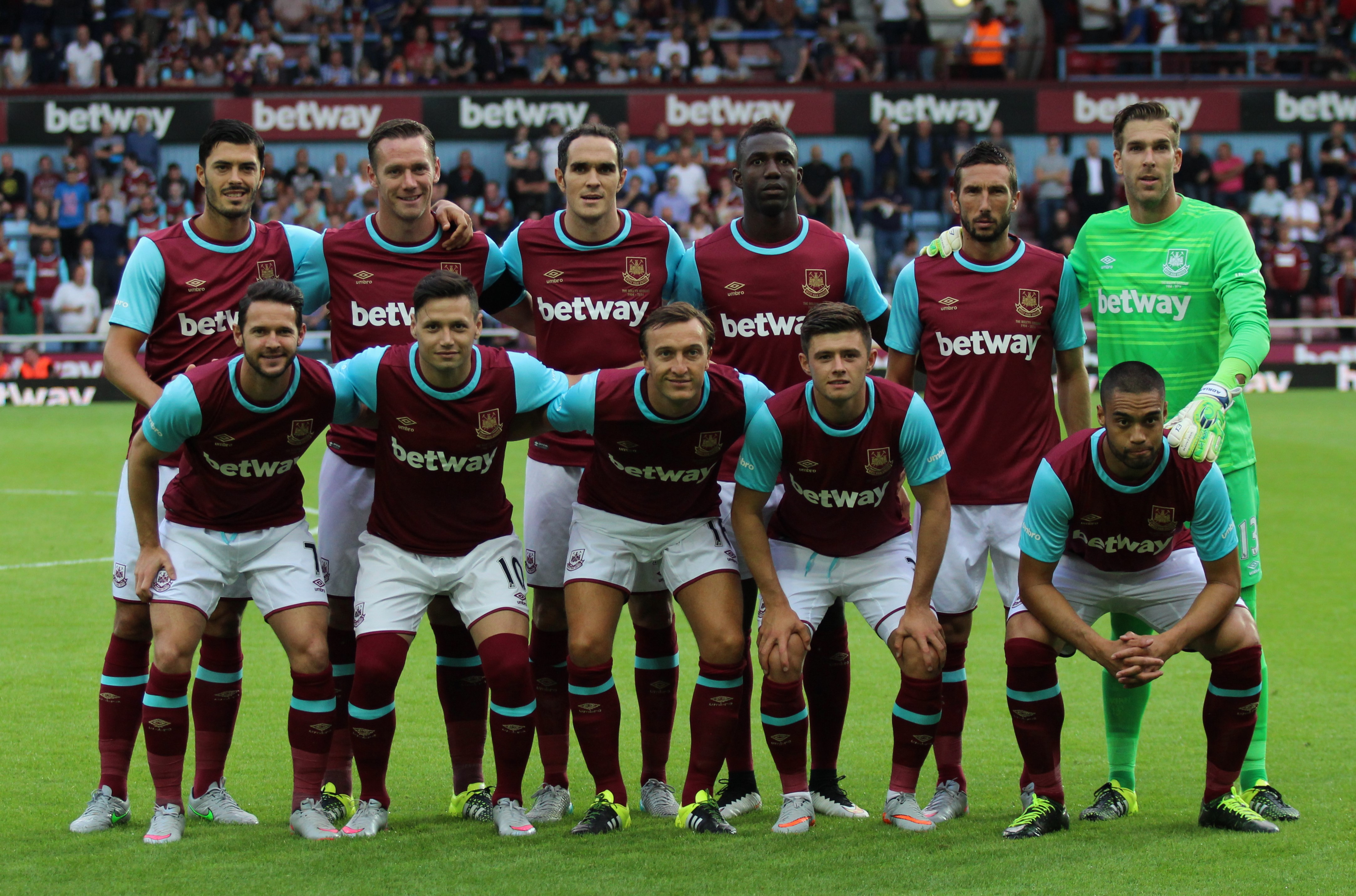
The Hammers side that faced Birkirkara of Malta.

On 22 June 2015, the first qualifying round for the 2015–16 UEFA Europa League was announced, West Ham United were drawn against Andorran side Lusitanos. On 9 July 2015, the final lineup of the second qualifying round was confirmed with West Ham drawn against Maltese side Birkirkara. On 6 August 2015, West Ham were knocked out of the Europa League in the third qualifying round following a 2–1 defeat by Romanian side Astra Giurgiu to lose 4–3 on aggregate.

==== First qualifying round ====
2 July 2015 First leg	West Ham United (England)	3–0	(Andorra) Lusitanos	Upton Park, England
19:45 BST	Oxford (yellow card) 27'; Sakho 40', 45'; Tomkins 58'	Report	Aguilar (yellow card) 24'; Nicolas (yellow card) 27'; Sonejee (yellow card) 63'	Stadium: The Boleyn Ground; Attendance: 34,966; Referee: Vadims Direktorenko (Latvia)

9 July 2015 Second leg	Lusitanos (Andorra)	0–1 (0–4 agg.)	(England) West Ham United	Andorra la Vella, Andorra
19:30 CEST	Nicolas (yellow card) 13'; Aguilar (yellow card) 45'; Moya (yellow card) 55'; Dos Reis (yellow card) 64'	Report	Lee 21'; Sakho (red card) 14'; Amalfitano (yellow card) 66'; Cullen (yellow card) 73'	Stadium: Estadi Comunal d'Andorra la Vella; Attendance: 837(772 Away); Referee: Anders Poulsen (Denmark)

==== Second qualifying round ====
16 July 2015 First leg	West Ham United (England)	1–0	(Malta) Birkirkara	Upton Park, England
19:45 BST	O'Brien (yellow card) 64'; Cresswell (yellow card) 69'; Reid (yellow card) 82' Tomkins 90'	Report	Muscat (yellow card) 38'	Stadium: The Boleyn Ground; Attendance: 33,048; Referee: Markus Hameter (Austria)

23 July 2015 Second leg	Birkirkara (Malta)	1–0 (a.e.t.) (1–1 agg.) (3–5 p)	(England) West Ham United	Ta' Qali, Malta
20:45 CEST	Miccoli 15' (yellow card) 33'; Vukanac (yellow card) 45+1'; Mazzetti (red card) 107'	Report	O'Brien (yellow card) 18'; Tomkins (red card) 45'; Collins (yellow card) 108'	Stadium: Ta' Qali National Stadium; Attendance: 15,257; Referee: Enea Jorgji ( Albania)
	Penalties
	Fenech (penalty scored); Plut (penalty scored); Vukanac (penalty missed); Agius (penalty scored)		Noble (penalty scored); Zárate (penalty scored); Cresswell (penalty scored); O'Brien (penalty scored); Poyet (penalty scored)

==== Third qualifying round ====
30 July 2015 First leg	West Ham United (England)	2–2	(Romania) Astra Giurgiu	Upton Park, England
19:45 BST	Valencia 23'; O'Brien (yellow card) 29'; Zárate 51'; Collins (yellow card) 55' (yellow-red card) 59'; Cresswell (yellow card) 79'; Payet (yellow card) 90+1'	Report	Enache (yellow card) 53'; Budescu (yellow card) 58'; Boldrin 71'; Ogbonna 82' (o.g.)	Stadium: The Boleyn Ground; Attendance: 33,858; Referee: Adrien Jaccottet (Switzerland)

6 August 2015 Second leg	Astra Giurgiu (Romania)	2–1 (4–3 agg.)	(England) West Ham United	Giurgiu, Romania
20:00 CEST	Budescu 32', 36'; Morais (yellow card) 37'; Alibec (yellow card) 83'; Lovin (yellow card) 89'	Report	Lanzini 3'; Knoyle (yellow card) 45'; Henry (yellow card) 49'	Stadium: Stadionul Marin Anastasovici; Attendance: 6,300; Referee: Paolo Valeri (Italy)

== New contracts ==
No.	Pos	Player	Contract length	Contract end	Date	Source
39	MF	(Republic of Ireland) Josh Cullen	3 years	2018	1 September 2015	
19	DF	(Wales) James Collins	2 years	2018	24 December 2015	

== Transfers ==
=== Summer ===
==== In ====
Date from	Position	Nationality	Name	From	Fee	Ref.
1 July 2015	LB	SCO	Stephen Hendrie	Hamilton Academical	Undisclosed	
1 July 2015	GK	IRL	Darren Randolph	Birmingham City	Free transfer	
1 July 2015	CM	ESP	Pedro Obiang	Sampdoria	Undisclosed	
1 July 2015	AM	NOR	Martin Samuelsen	Manchester City	Free transfer	
1 July 2015	AM	FRA	Dimitri Payet	Marseille	Undisclosed	
10 July 2015	CB	ITA	Angelo Ogbonna	Juventus	£7M	
14 July 2015	RB	ENG	Carl Jenkinson	Arsenal	Loan (season)	
22 July 2015	AM	ARG	Manuel Lanzini	Al Jazira	Loan (season)	
27 July 2015	CB	ENG	George Dobson	Arsenal	Undisclosed	
1 September 2015	LW	ENG	Michail Antonio	Nottingham Forest	Undisclosed	
1 September 2015	CF	CRO	Nikica Jelavić	Hull City	£3M	
1 September 2015	LW	NGA	Victor Moses	Chelsea	Loan (season)	
1 September 2015	DM	CMR	Alex Song	Barcelona	Loan (season)	
13 September 2015	CF	SER	Luka Belić	OFK Beograd	Free transfer	
11 November 2015	AM	ENG	Dan Kemp	Chelsea	Free transfer	
20 January 2016	DF	ENG	Sam Byram	Leeds United	Undisclosed	

==== Out ====
Date from	Position	Nationality	Name	To	Fee	Ref.
1 July 2015	CF	ENG	Carlton Cole	Celtic (Note: Following Cole's release he joined Celtic on 22 October 2015.)	Free transfer	
1 July 2015	RB	CIV	Guy Demel	Dundee United (Note: Following Demel's release he joined Dundee United on 23 November 2015.)	Free transfer	
1 July 2015	GK	FIN	Jussi Jääskeläinen	Wigan Athletic (Note: Following Jääskeläinen's release he joined Wigan Athletic on 11 August 2015.)	Free transfer	
1 July 2015	CF	IRL	Sean Maguire	Dundalk (Note: Following Maguire's release he joined Dundalk on 30 July 2015.)	Free transfer	
1 July 2015	CF	ENG	Paul McCallum	Leyton Orient (Note: Following McCallum's release he joined Leyton Orient on 19 June 2015.)	Free transfer	
1 July 2015	LW	BRA	Nenê	Vasco da Gama (Note: Following Nenê's release he joined Vasco da Gama on 6 August 2015.)	Free transfer	
1 July 2015	LB	ENG	Dan Potts	Luton Town (Note: Following Potts' release he joined Luton Town on 29 May 2015.)	Free transfer	
1 July 2015	MF	ENG	Kieran Bailey	Colchester United	Free transfer	
16 July 2015	AM	ENG	Stewart Downing	Middlesbrough	£5.5M	
7 August 2015	GK	ENG	Clarke Bogard	Tilbury	Loan (season)	
14 August 2015	MF	ENG	Moses Makasi	Chelmsford City	Loan	
19 August 2015	DM	URU	Diego Poyet	Milton Keynes Dons	Loan (season)	
20 August 2015	CB	ENG	Reece Burke	Bradford City	Loan	
27 August 2015	AM	ENG	Kevin Nolan	Free agent	Mutual consent	
28 August 2015	ST	MLI	Modibo Maïga	Al-Nassr (Note: Maïga's transfer was initially announced by Al-Nassr on 24 August, but the move did not go through until the 28th.)	Undisclosed	
31 August 2015	DF	ENG	Sam Westley	VVV-Venlo	Loan	
1 September 2015	MF	ENG	Matt Jarvis	Norwich City	Loan (season)	
6 October 2015	MF	FRA	Morgan Amalfitano	Lille (Note: Following Amalfitano's release he joined Lille on 7 January 2016.)	Free transfer	
9 October 2015	MF	ENG	Nathan Mavila	Aldershot Town	Loan	
10 October 2015	ST	ENG	Jordan Brown	Chelmsford City	Loan	
16 October 2015	DF	ENG	Josh Pask	Dagenham & Redbridge	Loan	
24 November 2015	DF	CAN	Doneil Henry	Blackburn Rovers	Loan	
24 November 2015	MF	NOR	Martin Samuelsen	Peterborough United	Loan	
4 January 2016	MF	URU	Diego Poyet	Charlton Athletic	Loan	
21 January 2016	FW	ARG	Mauro Zárate	Fiorentina	£1.6M	

== Under-21s ==
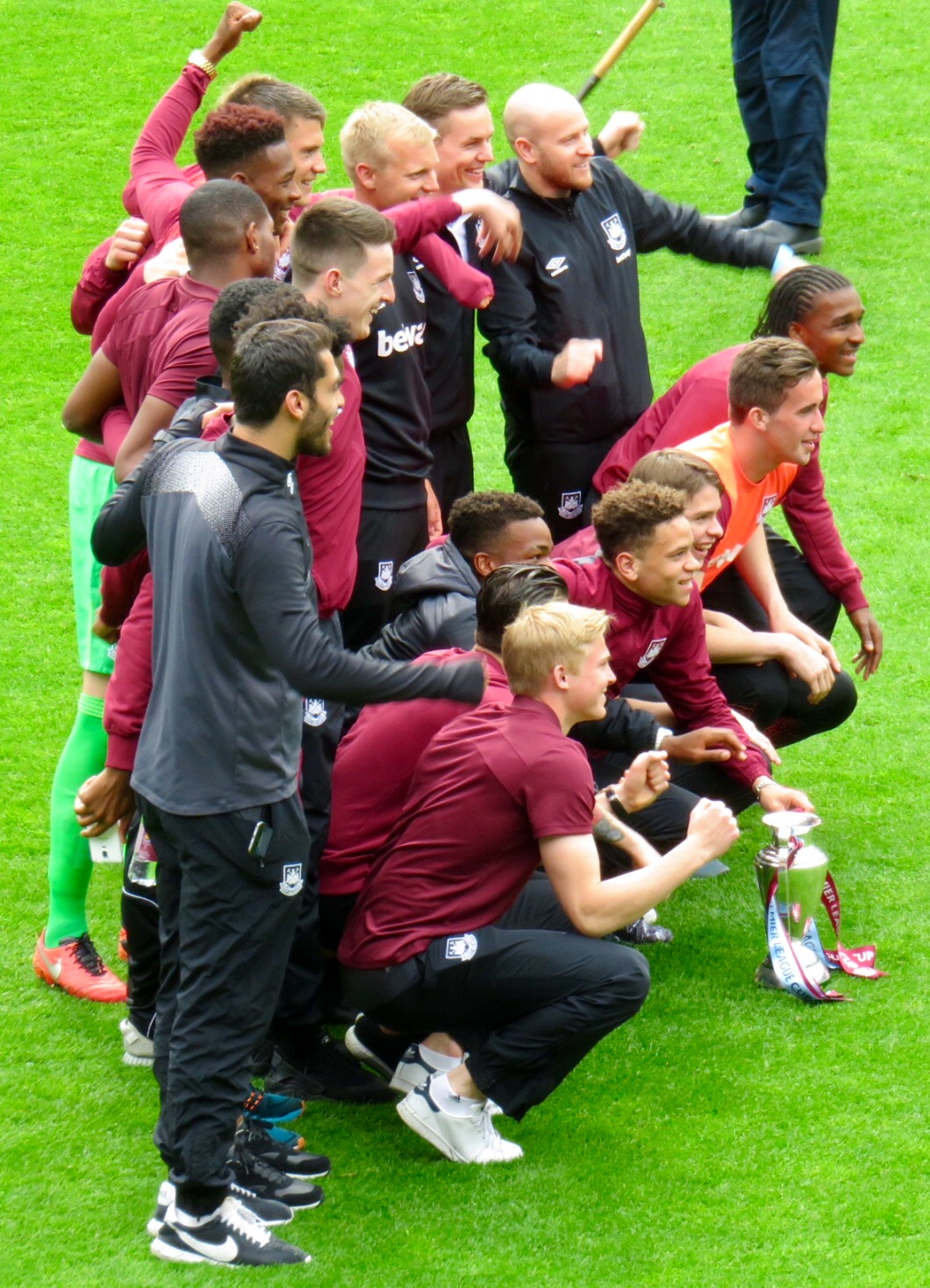
The 2015–16 U-21 Premier League Cup winning squad

=== Development squad ===
Note: Flags indicate national team as defined under FIFA eligibility rules; some limited exceptions apply. Players may hold more than one non-FIFA nationality.

No.	Pos.	Nation	Player
37	DF	ENG	Lewis Page
39	MF	IRL	Josh Cullen
40	DF	ENG	Manny Onariase
41	DF	ENG	Sam Westley
42	MF	NOR	Martin Samuelsen
43	FW	ENG	Jaanai Gordon
45	DF	ENG	Kyle Knoyle
51	FW	ENG	Jordan Brown
52	MF	ENG	Marcus Browne
53	MF	ENG	Matthew Carter
54	DF	ENG	Leo Chambers
55	MF	ENG	Grady Diangana
56	MF	ENG	Ross Elsom
57	FW	ENG	Jamal Hector-Ingram
58	GK	ENG	Sam Howes
60	MF	ENG	Moses Makasi
61	MF	ENG	Nathan Mavila

No.	Pos.	Nation	Player
62	DF	ENG	Amos Nasha
63	DF	ENG	Vashon Neuville
64	FW	BER	Djair Parfitt-Williams
65	DF	ENG	Josh Pask
66	DF	ENG	Alex Pike
67	FW	ENG	Joe Powell
68	MF	IRL	Declan Rice
69	MF	IRL	Anthony Scully
70	DF	ENG	Tunji Akinola
—	GK	ENG	Tim Brown
—	GK	ENG	Danny Boness
—	GK	ENG	Clarke Bogard
—	GK	LAT	Rihards Matrevics
—	DF	ENG	Jake Eggleton
—	MF	ENG	George Dobson
—	MF	SUI	Noha Sylvestre
—	MF	ENG	Idris Kanu
—	FW	SRB	Luka Belić

=== Trialists who made U21 appearances ===
Note: Flags indicate national team as defined under FIFA eligibility rules; some limited exceptions apply. Players may hold more than one non-FIFA nationality.

No.	Pos.	Nation	Player
—	MF	ENG	Omar Rowe
