= Manuel Lanzini =

Argentine footballer

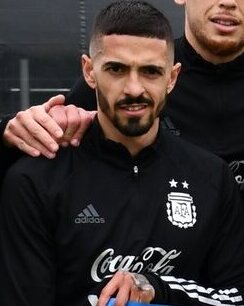
- Lanzini with Argentina in 2022

Personal information
- Date of birth: 15 February 1993 (age 33)
- Place of birth: Ituzaingó, Argentina
- Height: 1.67 m (5 ft 6 in)
- Position: Attacking midfielder

Team information
- Current team: Vélez Sarsfield
- Number: 22

Youth career
- 2002–2010: River Plate

Senior career*
Years	Team	Apps	(Gls)
2010–2014	River Plate	84	(12)
2011–2012	→ Fluminense (loan)	37	(5)
2014–2016	Al Jazira	24	(8)
2015–2016	→ West Ham United (loan)	26	(6)
2016–2023	West Ham United	153	(21)
2023–2025	River Plate	47	(1)
2025–	Vélez Sarsfield	28	(6)

International career
2013	Argentina U20	5	(2)
2017–2019	Argentina	5	(1)
- * Club domestic league appearances and goals as of 17:03, 16 June 2026 (UTC)

Manuel Lanzini (Latin American Spanish: [maˈnwel lanˈsini]; born 15 February 1993) is an Argentine professional footballer who plays as an attacking midfielder for Argentine Primera División club Vélez Sarsfield.

Lanzini started his career at River Plate, where he came through the youth system and with whom Lanzini holds the distinction of the earliest goal scored in the Superclásico derby, scoring only 43 seconds into the match., and spent time on loan at Fluminense. In 2014, he signed for Al Jazira in the UAE before being signed by West Ham on loan in 2015. He was subsequently signed permanently by the English club and was a regular until 2018, when he suffered a serious knee injury. Lanzini fought his way back to fitness and was a reliable squad player for the next 5 seasons, culminating in winning the 2023 UEFA Europa Conference League.

Lanzini made his international debut for Argentina in 2017. The knee injury suffered in 2018 meant he missed the opportunity to feature at the 2018 FIFA World Cup, and he has made only one subsequent appearance for the national team in 2019.

He is regarded as having well-developed dribbling skills, as well as good acceleration, vision, and an ability to ghost past defenders. He has been nicknamed "La Joya" ("the jewel").

== Career ==
=== Early career and beginnings at River Plate ===
Lanzini stood out in indoor soccer football divisions, demonstrating his skills in the Club Academia Kaly de Ituzaingó class of 1993, a neighbourhood club. Ramón Maddoni, who has discovered players like Juan Román Riquelme, Carlos Tevez and Esteban Cambiasso, wanted to take him to Boca Juniors for a test match but the young Lanzini declined the call, stating that he only aimed to play for the club he supported: River Plate.

Eventually, in 2002, he was taken to River Plate. He began training and started as a playmaker in junior divisions before, after several tests, Pedro Vega, ex-player and coach of inferior club divisions, ordered for him to be hired. In 2008, the eighth division team in which he played won its divisional trophy; Lanzini ultimately scored nine goals, only two fewer than fellow attacker Leonardo Salguero, with eleven goals. On 2 November 2008, River Plate won the junior division's Superclásico 3–0 to Boca Juniors with Lanzini scoring two goals and assisting Salguero in one other.

=== Elevation to first team and debut at River Plate (2010–11 season) ===
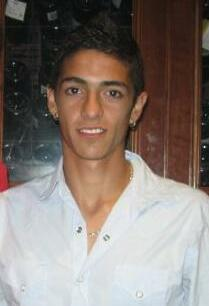
Lanzini in 2010

In 2010, Ángel Cappa, River Plate's first team coach, included Lanzini in the team for the winter preseason, disputing several matches in Salta Province. Lanzini made his informal debut in a friendly match against Central Norte, a 3–0 victory, coming on as a second-half substitute for Ariel Ortega. Lanzini then played another friendly match against Juventud Antoniana, where his performance earned good reception from press and fans alike.

Lanzini's performance in the 2010 winter preseason satisfied his coach. Finally, he made his first appearance on 8 August 2010, against Tigre for the first match of the 2010 Torneo Apertura. River Plate won 1–0 while Lanzini was replaced at half time by Facundo Affranchino.

Lanzini's appearance made him one of the youngest players to debut in the First Division for River Plate, being 17 years, 5 months and 24 days old, older only than Daniel Villalva, Adolfo Pedernera and ex-Barcelona and Real Madrid player Javier Saviola. After his debut, Cappa excluded him in the match against Huracán, but he replaced the suspended Ariel Ortega in the next game against Independiente, where he assisted Rogelio Funes Mori's goal for the 3–2 victory. In a match against Vélez Sársfield on 5 September, Lanzini suffered an injury after a tackle from Leandro Somoza, which ruled him out for three weeks. He made his comeback to the first team on the 12th match of the season.

=== Fluminense (2011–12 season) ===
On 19 July 2011, River Plate agreed to loan Lanzini to Fluminense for a fee of US$400,000, with a transfer option of $15,000,000.

Lanzini made his debut in the 2011 season of the Brasileirao for the 3–0 victory against Figueirense. He would then score his first official goal in the team's 20th game of the tournament, a 2–1 victory against São Paulo. His performances and character led to the club's president labelling him "the new Neymar". His most important goal for the club was against Flamengo in the Rio de Janeiro Fla-Flu derby.

Despite Lanzini's good performances, Fluminense was unable to retain him, and he returned to River Plate after the loan expired.

=== Comeback to River Plate and consolidation ===
==== 2012–13 season ====
Lanzini returned on 30 June 2012. He started for the team's first appearance in the tournament, scoring their only goal in the 1–2 loss against Belgrano. For his comeback, he asked his coach Matías Almeyda if he could use the club's iconic number 10 shirt, which Almeyda approved. However, during Almeyda's term Lanzini was unable to assure himself a place on the pitch, sometimes watching the matches from the bench.

Almeyda was fired and the club's most successful coach to that date, ex-Inter Milan player Ramón Díaz, was appointed as team manager. With him, Lanzini's chance of regaining a place as a starter increased. Diaz made Lanzini a starter in the team's 2–0 victory against San Martín (SJ), where he scored one goal. He was then considered a regular starter for the team. During the 12th match of the Torneo Final 2013 tournament, he scored his first goal in the Superclásico, one of the most heated football rivalries in the world, in the 1–1 draw against Boca Juniors; this goal, as of 2018, stands out as the fastest goal in the derby's history (43 seconds). River Plate finished the season in 2nd place.

==== 2013–14 season ====
Following the 2013 Torneo Final season, Lanzini received an offer from the United Arab Emirates' Baniyas football team, but he turned down the offer because, citing his own father, he prioritized his professional sporting career over economic opportunities. He remained one of the team's strongest players in the Torneo Inicial 2013 and the international Copa Sudamericana 2013, but overall River Plate were inconsistent and did not win any trophies.

Conversely, 2014 was one of the best years in the club's history. River Plate won both the Torneo Final 2014 and the Copa Sudamericana 2014, knocking out Boca Juniors from the latter. Lanzini played for the team for half of the year, and was considered instrumental in helping to win the Torneo Inicial 2014 trophy. He scored again in the team's 2014 Superclásico victory against Boca Juniors, the so-called "Bombonerazo" which began a series of victories for River Plate over Boca Juniors. The Superclásico match also stood out because it definitively launched the career of Lanzini's teammate Ramiro Funes Mori, a defender who scored a header in the last minutes of the match; he would end up also playing in the Premier League at the same time as Lanzini for Everton. Lanzini finished the season with 2 goals in 18 appearances for the team.

=== Al Jazira ===
On 6 August 2014, prior to the beginning of the 2014 Torneo de Transición Championship and Copa Sudamericana 2014, Lanzini transferred to the Al Jazira in the UAE Pro-League for a $6,000,000 four-year deal, with a salary amounting to $12,000,000 in three years. This made him the youngest foreign player to play in the UAE Pro-League, at just 21 years old. He was signed as a replacement for Marseille-bound Abdelaziz Barrada, and had been courted by clubs in England, Spain, Italy and Turkey.

=== West Ham United ===
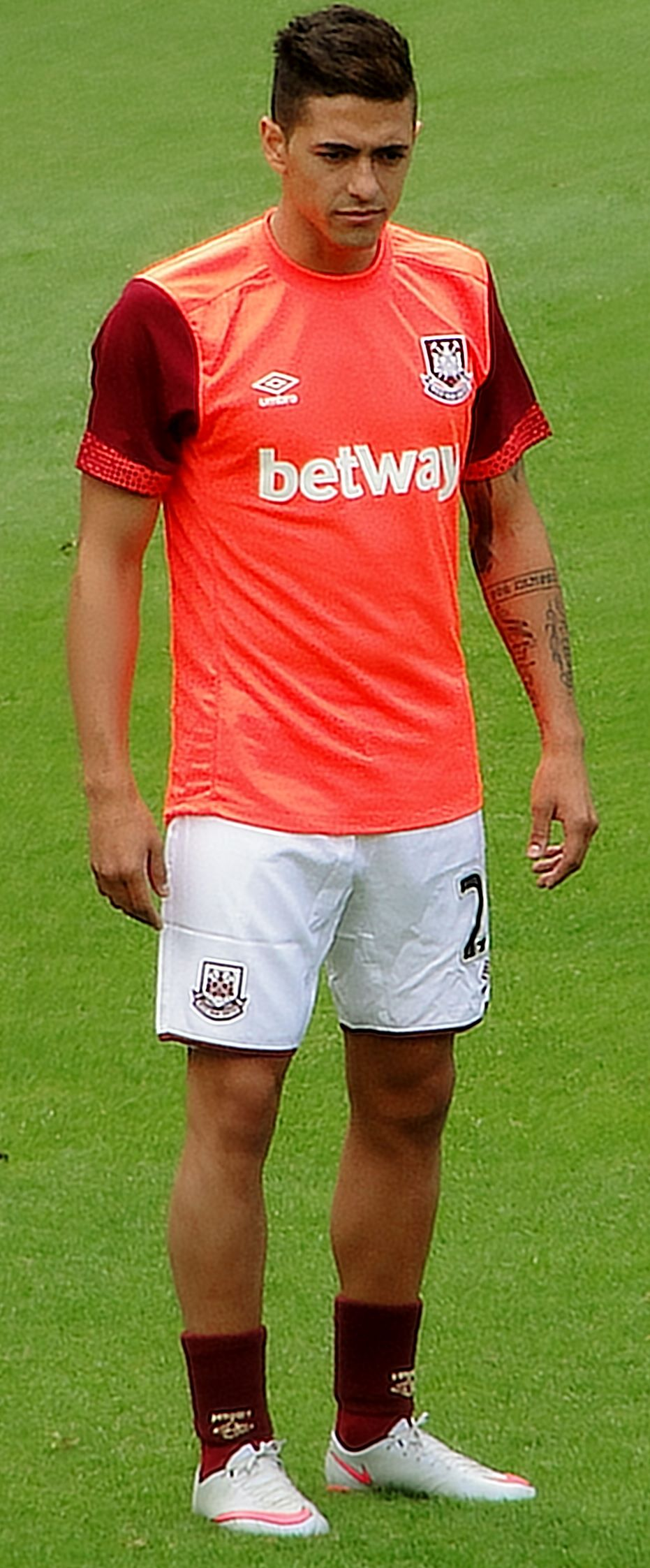
Lanzini warming-up for West Ham United in August 2015

==== 2015–16 season ====
On 22 July 2015, Lanzini signed for Premier League side West Ham United on a season-long loan, with an option to make the move permanent. He made his debut on 6 August in the UEFA Europa League third qualifying round away to Astra, starting the match and scoring in the third minute, however the Hammers lost 2–1 (4–3 on aggregate) and were eliminated.

His league debut came on 15 August as a 76th-minute substitute for Cheikhou Kouyaté in a 1–2 home defeat to Leicester City. On 29 August, he scored his first league goal after just three minutes away to Liverpool, and assisted a goal from Mark Noble as the Hammers won 3–0 for their first victory at Anfield since 1963. In March 2016, West Ham confirmed that they had taken up the option to sign Lanzini on a permanent deal, with effect from 1 July 2016.

==== 2016–17 season ====
Lanzini played 39 games in all competitions for West Ham, scoring eight goals. On 15 October 2016, he scored the only goal in a 1–0 win away to Crystal Palace to give West Ham their first away win of the season. His goal in a 1–0 win against London rivals Tottenham Hotspur on 5 May 2017 halted Tottenham's challenge to win the Premier League title. Tottenham, at the time, were on a nine-match winning run and were challenging Chelsea for the league title. On 9 May he was voted runner-up to Michail Antonio as Hammer of the Year and the Players’ Player of the Year.

==== 2017–18 season ====
Lanzini made his first appearance of the season on 26 August 2017, in a 3–0 defeat away at Newcastle United. In the same game, Lanzini was caught by the elbow of Aleksandar Mitrović, who was later banned for three games as a result of the incident. Lanzini scored his first goal of the season in a 1–4 defeat at home to Liverpool on 4 November 2017, before adding a further two goals to his tally on 13 January 2018 in a 4–1 away win at Huddersfield Town. On 13 May, he scored twice in a 3–1 win over Everton, on the final day of the season.

==== 2018–19 season ====
After being sidelined due to injury since May 2018, Lanzini made his first appearance of the season on 22 February 2019, coming on as a 76th-minute substitute for Felipe Anderson in a 3–1 home win against Fulham. Lanzini made nine more league appearances during the 2018–19 season, scoring once in a 4–1 away win against Watford on the final day of the season.

==== 2019–20 season ====
Lanzini made his first appearance of the season on 10 August 2019 in West Ham's opening game against 2018–19 Premier League Champions, Manchester City, resulting in a 5–0 loss. Following his 100th Premier League appearance, it was announced on 30 August 2019 that Lanzini had signed a new long-term contract with West Ham, extending his contract until 30 June 2023, with Lanzini stating: "I love London, I love the Club, I am happy here, we have a very good team, we have a very good manager and the Club wants to change and to be in more competitions in the future and that’s good for us". On 9 November, Lanzini suffered a broken collarbone during the closing stages of a 3–0 defeat by Burnley.

==== 2020–21 season ====
On 18 October 2020, in his first league game of the season, Lanzini scored his first goal of the season in a 3–3 away draw against Tottenham Hotspur. Trailing 3–0 until the 82nd minute, Lanzini scored a spectacular equalizer from 25 yards out in the fourth minute of added time to even the score to 3–3 and salvage a point for the Hammers; he was subsequently awarded the Premier League Goal of the Month award in recognition. Through Lanzini's equaliser, West Ham became the first team in Premier League history to avoid defeat, having been losing by three or more goals, as late in the game as the 81st minute.

On 16 June 2023, West Ham announced that Lanzini would be leaving the club at the end of the 2022–23 season after his contract expires.

=== Return to River Plate ===
On 2 August 2023, Lanzini returned to River Plate, signing a one-year contract. He returned to the pitch later that month, coming in for Matías Kranevitter during the second half at Argentinos Juniors' Diego Armando Maradona stadium. On 2 January 2025, he signed a one-year extension.

On 25 October 2025, Lanzini was presented with a framed shirt numbered 100 to celebrate him making 100 appearances for his boyhood club.

=== Vélez Sarsfield ===
On 21 August 2025, Lanzini joined fellow Argentine Primera División club Vélez Sarsfield.

== International career ==
In May 2016, Lanzini was named in Argentina's provisional 35-man squad for the 2016 Olympics in Rio de Janeiro. He withdrew from the squad in July 2016 following a knee injury sustained while training in Miami, Florida, returning to London for treatment with West Ham United.

In May 2017 Lanzini was named in new Argentina manager Jorge Sampaoli's first squad for the upcoming friendlies against Brazil and Singapore, with Lanzini making his full international debut on 9 June against Brazil at the MCG in Melbourne, Australia, replacing Ever Banega in the 81st minute of Argentina's 1–0 win. On 23 March 2018 he played a friendly match against Italy at the Ethiad Stadium in Manchester and scored his first international goal as Argentina secured a 2–0 victory.

On 21 May 2018 he was named in Argentina's final 23-man squad for the 2018 FIFA World Cup in Russia, and started in the 4–0 friendly win against Haiti on 29 May in Buenos Aires, playing an hour before being substituted by Maximiliano Meza. On 8 June 2018, Lanzini was ruled out of the World Cup after suffering a ruptured anterior knee ligament injury during a training session. He was replaced by Enzo Pérez on 9 June.

== Personal life ==
Lanzini was born in Greater Buenos Aires, in Ituzaingó, and raised in San Antonio de Padua. He also holds an Italian passport.

His father, Héctor, played for Sporting Cristal and Deportivo Morón, while his brother Tomás has played for Ñublense and Brown de Adrogué.

He is outspoken about his support of River Plate, celebrating club victories on social media, and has a tattoo of himself with the River Plate shirt on.

== Career statistics ==
=== Club ===
As of match played 6 February 2026

Appearances and goals by club, season and competition
Club	Season	League			National cup		League cup		Continental		Other		Total	
Club	Season	Division	Apps	Goals	Apps	Goals	Apps	Goals	Apps	Goals	Apps	Goals	Apps	Goals
River Plate	2010–11	Argentine Primera División	22	0	0	0	—		—		—		22	0
River Plate	2012–13	Argentine Primera División	26	8	0	0	—		0	0	—		26	8
River Plate	2013–14	Argentine Primera División	36	4	1	0	—		6 (Note: Appearances in Copa Sudamericana)	1	—		43	5
River Plate	Total		84	12	1	0	0	0	6	1	0	0	91	13
Fluminense (loan)	2011	Série A	22	2	0	0	0	0	0	0	—		22	2
Fluminense (loan)	2012	Série A	6	1	0	0	9 (Note: Appearances in Campeonato Carioca)	2	5 (Note: Appearances in Copa Libertadores)	0	—		20	3
Fluminense (loan)	Total		28	3	0	0	9	2	5	0	0	0	42	5
Al Jazira	2014–15	UAE Pro League	24	8	4	0	—		1 (Note: Appearance in AFC Champions League)	0	—		29	8
West Ham United (loan)	2015–16	Premier League	26	6	3	0	1	0	1 (Note: Appearances in UEFA Europa League)	1	—		31	7
West Ham United	2016–17	Premier League	35	8	1	0	3	0	0	0	—		39	8
West Ham United	2017–18	Premier League	27	5	1	0	1	0	—		—		29	5
West Ham United	2018–19	Premier League	10	1	0	0	0	0	—		—		10	1
West Ham United	2019–20	Premier League	24	0	2	0	0	0	—		—		26	0
West Ham United	2020–21	Premier League	17	1	3	0	3	0	—		—		23	1
West Ham United	2021–22	Premier League	30	5	2	1	3	1	10	0	—		45	7
West Ham United	2022–23	Premier League	10	1	1	0	1	0	11 (Note: Appearances in UEFA Europa Conference League)	2	—		23	3
West Ham United	Total		179	27	13	1	12	1	22	3	0	0	226	32
River Plate	2023	Argentine Primera División	19	1	0	0	17 (Note: Appearances in Copa de la Liga Profesional and Trofeo de Campeones de la Liga Profesional)	0	6	0	1 (Note: Appearances in Trofeo de Campeones de la Liga Profesional)	0	43	1
River Plate	2024	Argentine Primera División	10	0	0	0	3	0	3	1	2 (Note: Appearances in Supercopa Internacional and FIFA Club World Cup)	0	18	1
River Plate	Total		29	1	0	0	20	0	9	1	3	0	61	2
Vélez Sarsfield	2025	Argentine Primera División	11	3	0	0	0	0	2	0	1 (Note: Appearances in Supercopa Argentina)	0	14	3
Vélez Sarsfield	2026	Argentine Primera División	3	1	0	0	0	0	0	0	—		3	1
Vélez Sarsfield	Total		14	4	0	0	0	0	2	0	1	0	17	4
Career total			357	54	18	1	41	3	45	5	4	0	465	63

=== International ===
As of match played 10 September 2019

Appearances and goals by national team and year
National team	Year	Apps	Goals
Argentina	2017	2	0
Argentina	2018	2	1
Argentina	2019	1	0
Total		5	1

As of 23 March 2018 (Argentina score listed first, score column indicates score after each Lanzini goal)

International goals by date, venue, cap, opponent, score, result and competition
No.	Date	Venue	Opponent	Score	Result	Competition
1	23 March 2018	City of Manchester, Manchester, England	Italy	2–0	2–0	Friendly

== Honours ==
Fluminense

- Campeonato Brasileiro Série A: 2012
- Campeonato Carioca: 2012
- Taca Guanabara: 2012

River Plate

- Argentine Primera División: Torneo Final 2014
- Copa Campeonato: 2014
- Trofeo de Campeones: 2023
- Supercopa Argentina: 2023

West Ham United

- UEFA Europa Conference League: 2022–23

Vélez Sarsfield

- Supercopa Argentina: 2024

Argentina

- Superclásico de las Américas: 2017

Individual

- Premier League Goal of the Month: October 2020
- West Ham United Players' Player of the Year: 2016–17
- West Ham United Goal of the Season: 2021–22
