= Anouar El Mhassani =

Dutch footballer

Personal information
- Full name: Anouar El Mhassani
- Date of birth: 18 April 2001 (age 25)
- Place of birth: Amsterdam, Netherlands
- Height: 1.78 m (5 ft 10 in)
- Positions: Midfielder; winger

Youth career
- -2009: AVV Zeeburgia
- 2009-2017: AFC Ajax
- 2017-2020: West Ham United

Senior career*
Years	Team	Apps	(Gls)
2020–2021	Ajman Club	9	(1)
- * Club domestic league appearances and goals

Anouar El Mhassani (born 18 April 2001) is a Dutch professional footballer who plays as a midfielder or winger.

== Career ==
After 8 years at the academy of Ajax Amsterdam, El Mhassani signed his first professional contract in July 2017 for West Ham United, where he spent 3 years playing for their U18 & U23 teams.

In 2020, El Mhassani signed for Ajman Club in the Emirati top flight.
