= Armand Sylvestre =

Armand Sylvestre may refer to:

- Armand Sylvestre (MLA) (1910–1980), Quebec lawyer, judge and member of the Quebec legislative assembly representing Berthier
- Armand Sylvestre (MP) (1890–1972), Quebec lawyer and member of the Canadian House of Commons representing Lake St. John
- Armand Silvestre, French poet, author of the libretto for the opera Grisélidis by Jules Massenet
