= Noha Sylvestre =

Swiss footballer (born 1997)

Personal information
- Full name: Noha Sylvestre
- Date of birth: 29 December 1997 (age 28)
- Place of birth: Basel, Switzerland
- Height: 1.74 m (5 ft 8 1/2 in)
- Position: Midfielder

Team information
- Current team: SR Delémont
- Number: 21

Youth career
- FC Bure
- US Boncourt
- Concordia Basel
- 2013–2016: West Ham United

Senior career*
Years	Team	Apps	(Gls)
2016–2019	West Ham United	0	(0)
2019–2020	Neuchâtel Xamax	3	(0)
2020	→ Biel-Bienne (loan)	0	(0)
2020–2021	Chaux-de-Fonds	5	(3)
2021–	SR Delémont	36	(2)

International career
2015	Switzerland U18	4	(0)
- * Club domestic league appearances and goals as of 17:58, 19 July 2023 (UTC)

Noha Sylvestre (born 29 December 1997) is a Swiss international footballer who plays for SR Delémont as a midfielder.

== Club career ==
Sylvestre began his career playing youth football in his native Switzerland for FC Bure, US Boncourt and FC Concordia Basel, before joining West Ham United in 2014. In May 2016, Sylvestre signed his first professional contract with West Ham. On 25 June 2019, following his release from West Ham, Sylvestre signed for Neuchâtel Xamax on a two-year contract. In February 2020, Sylvestre was loaned to fourth tier Swiss side FC Biel-Bienne.

On 1 September 2020, Sylvestre moved to FC La Chaux-de-Fonds on a one-year deal.

== International career ==
In March 2015, Sylvestre was called up for Switzerland U18 for a double header against their English counterparts.

== Personal life ==
Sylvestre's father, Patrick, gained 11 caps for Switzerland during his career.
