= Diego Poyet =

Uruguayan footballer and coach (born 1995)

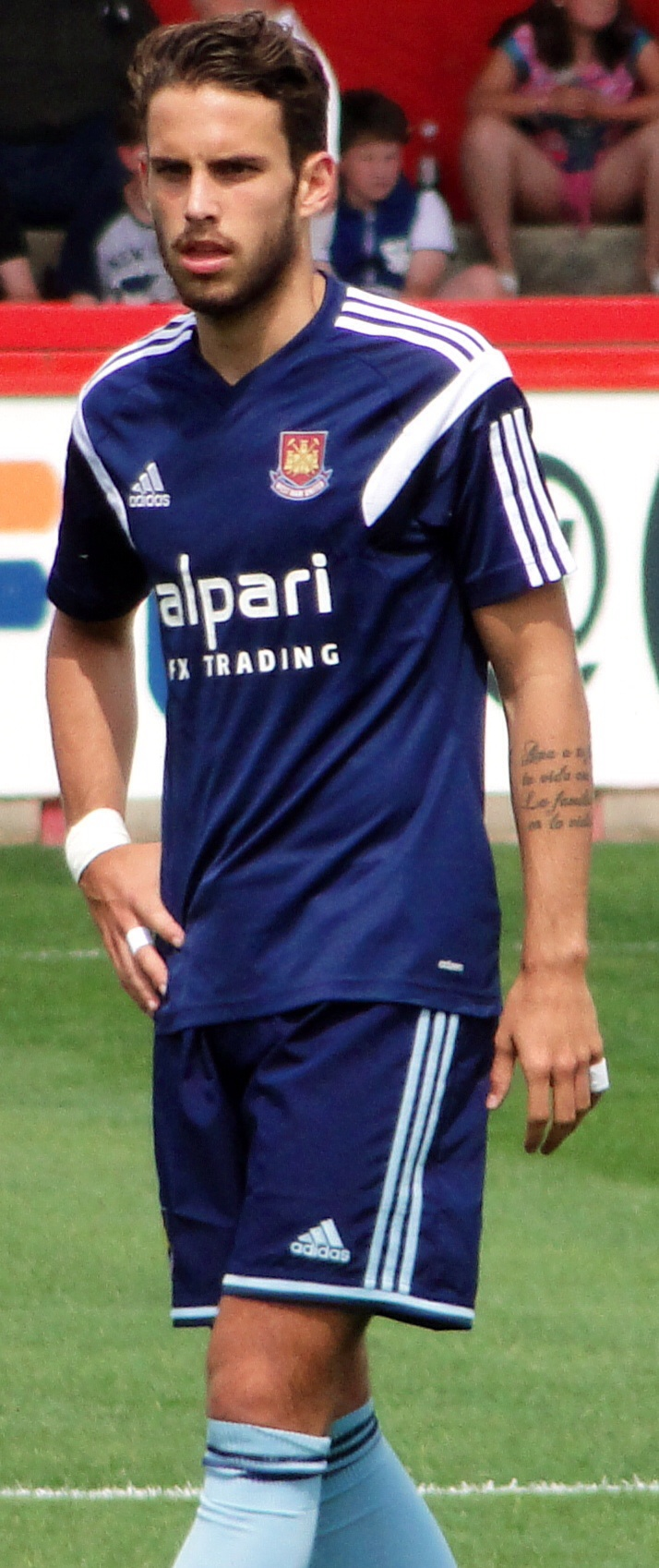
- Poyet training with West Ham United in 2014

Personal information
- Full name: Diego Poyet González
- Date of birth: 8 April 1995 (age 31)
- Place of birth: Zaragoza, Spain
- Height: 1.80 m (5 ft 11 in)
- Position: Midfielder

Youth career
- –2013: Charlton Athletic

Senior career*
Years	Team	Apps	(Gls)
2013–2014	Charlton Athletic	20	(0)
2014–2016	West Ham United	3	(0)
2014	→ Huddersfield Town (loan)	2	(0)
2015–2016	→ Milton Keynes Dons (loan)	18	(0)
2016	→ Charlton Athletic (loan)	6	(0)
2017	Godoy Cruz	0	(0)
2017–2018	Pafos	22	(0)
Total		71	(0)

International career
2010–2011	England U16	7	(0)
2011–2012	England U17	6	(0)
2015	Uruguay U20	7	(0)
- * Club domestic league appearances and goals

Diego Poyet González (Spanish pronunciation: [ˈdjeɣo poˈʝet]; born 8 April 1995) is a professional football coach and former player. Born in Spain, he played for England at under-16 and under-17 levels and for Uruguay at under-20 level.

A midfielder, he began his career at Charlton Athletic, where he was their 2013–14 Player of the Season despite not featuring in the first team until January. In July 2014, he was signed by West Ham, who loaned him to Huddersfield Town, Milton Keynes Dons, and Charlton.

== Club career ==
=== Charlton Athletic ===
Having started his career at Charlton Athletic since joining the club's U13 side, Poyet was offered a scholarships by the Addicks in March 2011 and signed his first professional deal five months later. Having progressed through the Charlton Athletic Academy, he signed his first professional contract with the club.

Poyet made his professional debut on 21 January 2014 in a 3–0 FA Cup third-round win over Oxford United, entering the match as an 81st-minute substitute for Dale Stephens. He made his first league start for Charlton Athletic on 1 February 2014 in a 2–1 defeat away to Wigan Athletic. After making these appearances, the club's manager Chris Powell said he expected Poyet to make more appearances in the first team. Following this, he eventually became a first team regular, rotating in either playing in the defensive midfield or central midfield positions. By the end of the 2013–14 season, Poyet had gone on to make twenty–three (20 league games) appearances in all competitions. For his performance, he was named Charlton Athletic Player of the Year, despite only becoming a regular in the team in February.

On 26 June 2014, Charlton announced that Poyet had indicated that he would not be signing an extension to his contract ending on 1 July 2014, and would be exploring his options elsewhere.

=== West Ham United ===
Poyet joined West Ham United on 8 July 2014, signing a four-year contract with West Ham and Charlton reaching a settlement for compensation. His father, Gus, manager of Sunderland, was also keen to sign his son, but backed away, citing fear of nepotism which could have caused conflict in the dressing room. Upon joining the club, he was given a number twenty–three shirt.

On 23 August 2014, Poyet made his debut for West Ham United, against Crystal Palace, coming on in the 83rd minute for Mauro Zárate in a 3–1 away win. Four days later, he started for the first time, playing the full 120 minutes and scoring in the penalty shoot-out as the club lost at home to Sheffield United in the second round of the League Cup. A month later on 27 September 2014, Poyet made his first start in the Premier League, starting a match and played 75 minutes before being substituted, in a 2–1 loss against Manchester United. Following his loan spell at Huddersfield Town came to an end, he made his first appearance for West Ham United in the FA Cup third round match against Everton, coming on as a 68th-minute substitute, in a 1–1 draw on 6 January 2015. At the end of the 2014–15 season, he went on to make five appearances in all competitions.

On 23 July 2015, as a substitute for captain Kevin Nolan, Poyet scored the winner in a penalty shootout at the Ta' Qali National Stadium in Malta, at the end of a 1–1 aggregate draw with Birkirkara in the second qualifying round of that season's UEFA Europa League. He continued to appear in the club's matches in the Europa League before being eliminated by Astra Giurgiu in the third round. Without having played any games for West Ham in the 2016–17 season, Poyet's contract was cancelled by West Ham United on 31 August 2016 by mutual consent, and by the time he departed from the club, Poyet had made 10 appearances in all competitions for West Ham.

==== Loan Spells from West Ham United ====
On 7 November 2014, Poyet joined Huddersfield Town of the Championship on a one-month youth loan until 6 December 2014. He was signed by Chris Powell, his former manager at Charlton. The day after he signed, Poyet was an unused substitute as Huddersfield lost 3–1 away at Fulham. He made his début on 22 November at the John Smith's Stadium, playing the full 90 minutes in a goalless draw against Sheffield Wednesday. He played the next game against Bolton Wanderers, but was not included in their 2–1 win over Brentford, and returned to West Ham at the end of his loan.

On 19 August 2015, Poyet signed on a season-long loan deal with Championship side Milton Keynes Dons. He made his debut three days later, playing the entirety of a goalless draw away to Reading. Since joining the club, Poyet began to establish himself in the starting eleven, playing in the midfield position. By December, however, he had been receiving little playing time due to a similar playing style to team regular and vice-captain, Darren Potter, as well as, his own injury concern. His loan spell with Milton Keynes Dons was cut short in January 2016 by manager Karl Robinson. By the time Poyet left the club, he made twenty appearances in all competitions.

On 4 January 2016, Poyet returned to Charlton on a loan spell until the end of the season, regaining his old number 39 jersey. Five days later on 9 January 2016, he played the first game of that loan, featuring for the entirety of a 2–1 loss at Colchester United in the FA Cup. Three days later on 12 January 2016, Poyet played the first Championship game of the spell, falling 5–0 at Huddersfield Town. However, he found his first team opportunities limited under the management of José Riga. Both of the teams he was loaned to ended the season with relegation to League One. At the end of the 2015–16 season, Poyet went on to make six appearances in all competitions. Following this, he returned to his parent club.

=== Godoy Cruz ===
Following his release by West Ham United, Poyet was linked with a move to clubs from England and abroad. On 7 February 2017, he signed for Argentinian club Godoy Cruz.

Poyet made his debut for the club, starting the whole game, in a 3–1 win against Sport Boys Warnes on 28 April 2017 in the Copa Libertadores. He later made two more appearances for Godoy Cruz. However, Poyet was let go by the club and reflected on his time there, saying: "I decided to move across the world to play. In Argentina you can only have four foreigners at a time for each season. The club I signed for already had four players but a Uruguayan striker was set to leave the day after I arrived. He was their star striker but he went to do his medical and failed. It got out in the news, so the other three players occupying the international player slots didn't want to leave. So no one was going to sign the striker and I was left as the fifth player. I was there for six months and could only play in the Copa Libertadores, where you can register new players for that but not for the league. It was a nightmare, it was the worst time of my life. I was in Argentina, living by myself, training week in, week out and for six months I could only wait for the Copa Libertadores. When it came around, the manager was hesitant to play me as I hadn't played a game in months and had to decide if he wanted to play a player who hasn't played and isn't match fit. It was a nightmare for me. I struggled on and off the pitch, as I was struggling to play and I was away from home for the first time properly, so it was a very hard time for me."

=== Pafos ===
On 31 August 2017, Poyet signed for Cypriot First Division side Pafos. He made his debut for the club, coming on as an 86th-minute substitute, in a 1–1 draw against Alki Oroklini on 10 September 2017. In the following match against AC Omonia, Poyet made his first start for Pafos and helped the club win 2–1. Poyet featured in and out of the starting line–up throughout the 2017–18 season. The club avoided relegation after finishing tenth place in the league and he made twenty–two appearances in all competitions. Following this, Poyet left the club in hopes of joining a Romanian club, but the move did not materialise. After two years without a club, he retired from professional football.

== International career ==
Born in Spain to Uruguayan parents, Poyet was raised in England after his father, Gus, signed for Chelsea in 1997. He is eligible to play for any of these three countries.

=== England ===
Poyet has represented England when he was first called up at under-16, making his debut for the U16 side, losing 4–0 against Wales U16 on 16 October 2010. Poyet later made seven more appearances for England U16, in which he captained the U16 side in a number of matches.

In October 2011, Poyet was called up to the under-17, making his debut for the U17 side, winning 4–0 against Latvia U17 in the same month. He later captained twice for England U17 and went on to make six appearances for the U17 side.

Poyet was selected to take part in an England under-19 training camp in May 2014. He then received his first call-up to the England under-20 squad for a match with Romania on 5 September 2014, but withdrew from the squad before the game. Head coach Aidy Boothroyd subsequently stated that "Diego hasn't decided whether he wants to play for Uruguay or not so, rather than wait for him to make his mind up, we have decided to leave him to it".

=== Uruguay ===
In February 2015, the Uruguayan Football Association announced their intention to call up Poyet for two games in March 2015 against Portugal and Uzbekistan ahead of the 2015 FIFA U-20 World Cup. In March 2015, he made his debut for Uruguay U20, coming on as a substitute for Mauro Arambarri in a 1–1 draw against France U20 at Clairefontaine.

In May 2015, Poyet was called up to the U20 squad for the 2015 FIFA U-20 World Cup in New Zealand. He appeared twice as a substitute against Serbia U20 and Mexico U20. Poyet made his first start of the tournament against Mali U20 on 6 June 2015, as Uruguay U20 drew 1–1 and progressed to the knockout stage. He, once again, started in the tournament against Brazil U20 in the Round of 16, playing 120 minutes and was one of the four players to successfully convert the spot kick in the penalty shootout, as the U20 side lost 5–4. Following the tournament, Poyet reflected on his time in the World Cup, saying: "The team had to do quite well in the U20 Copa America, which was held in January, to qualify for the World Cup. They finished second, so there was already a team there formed which knew each other. In between that time and the World Cup, I'm grateful for how they received me and I felt part of the group right away."

== Coaching career ==
In February 2022, Poyet was appointed as assistant manager of Greece to work alongside his father who has been appointed as manager.

He would go on to follow his father to Jeonbuk Hyundai Motors during the following season.

== Personal life ==
Poyet is the son of Gus Poyet, a former Uruguay international footballer. With his father signed to Real Zaragoza, Poyet was born in Zaragoza in 1995. Poyet's paternal grandfather Washington was a basketball player, who captained the Uruguay national team. His uncle Marcelo also played the sport at a professional level. Growing up, he idolised Zinedine Zidane, calling him "the best midfielder there has been."

In addition to speaking English, Poyet also speaks Spanish and communicated well with his then teammates Adrián and Mauro Zárate during his time at West Ham United. In July 2014, Poyet issued an apology after his tweet calling West Ham United "scum" was resurfaced.

== Career statistics ==
As of match played as of the end of 2017–18 season.

Appearances and goals by club, season and competition
Club	Season	League			FA Cup		League Cup		Other		Total	
Club	Season	Division	Apps	Goals	Apps	Goals	Apps	Goals	Apps	Goals	Apps	Goals
Charlton Athletic	2013–14	Championship	20	0	3	0	0	0	—		23	0
West Ham United	2014–15	Premier League	3	0	1	0	1	0	—		5	0
West Ham United	2015–16	Premier League	0	0	—		—		5 (Note: Five appearances in UEFA Europa League)	0	5	0
West Ham United	2016–17	Premier League	0	0	0	0	0	0	0	0	0	0
West Ham United	Total		3	0	1	0	1	0	5	0	10	0
Huddersfield Town (loan)	2014–15	Championship	2	0	—		—		—		2	0
Milton Keynes Dons (loan)	2015–16	Championship	18	0	—		2	0	—		20	0
Charlton Athletic (loan)	2015–16	Championship	6	0	1	0	—		—		7	0
Godoy Cruz	2016–17	Argentine Primera División	0	0	0	0	—		3 (Note: Three appearances in Copa Libertadores)	0	3	0
Pafos	2017–18	Cypriot First Division	22	0	4	0	—		—		26	0
Career total			71	0	9	0	3	0	8	0	91	0

== Honours ==
Individual

- Charlton Athletic Player of the Year: 2013–14
