= 2014–15 West Ham United F.C. season =

English football team season

West Ham United
2014–15 season
- Co-chairmen: David Gold; David Sullivan
- Manager: Sam Allardyce
- Stadium: Boleyn Ground; Upton Park, London
- Premier League: 12th
- FA Cup: Fifth round
- League Cup: Second round
- Top goalscorer: League: Diafra Sakho (10); All: Diafra Sakho (11)
- Highest home attendance: League: 34,977 (vs Tottenham Hotspur, Liverpool, Arsenal and Manchester City); Cup:
- Lowest home attendance: League: 34,125 (vs Swansea City); Cup: 28,930 (vs Sheffield United)
- Average home league attendance: 34,942
Home colours	Away colours	Third colours

The 2014–15 season was West Ham United's third campaign in the Premier League since being promoted in the 2011–12 season. It was West Ham's 19th Premier League campaign overall.

As well as competing in the Premier League, West Ham took part in the FA Cup and the League Cup entering at the third and second rounds respectively.

Sam Allardyce started his fourth full season as West Ham manager, with Kevin Nolan captaining the team for the fourth year. It was to be their penultimate season playing at the Boleyn Ground before moving to the Olympic Stadium for the start of the 2016–17 season.

West Ham got off to a very good start in the league. The team was 3rd in the Premier League table on Christmas Day but won just 3 matches between Boxing Day and the end of the season as their form collapsed dramatically and they finished in 12th place, one position higher than the previous season. Minutes after the last game of season- a 0–2 defeat away at Newcastle, the club announced that they would not be renewing manager Allardyce's contract.

== Key events ==
- 23 May 2014: The release of players Joe Cole, Jack Collison, George McCartney, Callum Driver and Jordan Spence is announced.
- 28 May 2014: West Ham announce the signing of Argentine player Mauro Zárate from Vélez Sarsfield.
- 18 June 2014: Cheikhou Kouyaté signs from Belgian champions Anderlecht on a four-year contract for an undisclosed fee.
- 3 July 2014: Left back Aaron Cresswell is signed from Ipswich Town on a five-year contract for an undisclosed fee.
- 8 July 2014: Midfielder Diego Poyet, Charlton Athletic's Player of the Season for 2013–14, signs on a four-year contract.
- 29 July 2014: Ecuadorian Enner Valencia signs for an estimated £12 million fee from Mexican club Pachuca on a five-year contract.
- 31 July 2014: Carl Jenkinson of Arsenal is signed on a season-long loan.
- 14 August 2014: Senegalese forward, Diafra Sakho, is signed on a four-year contract from French club Metz for an undisclosed fee.
- 30 August 2014: Alex Song of Barcelona is signed on a season-long loan and becomes West Ham's eighth signing of the summer transfer window.
- 7 November 2014: Manager Sam Allardyce is named Manager of the Month and Diafra Sakho Player of the Month for October 2014.
- 28 November 2014: Both West Ham and Everton are fined £20,000 by the FA for failing to control their players, after an on-pitch brawl during the game at Goodison Park on 22 November.
- 3 January 2015: Doneil Henry, a Canada international defender, is signed for an undisclosed fee.
- 17 January 2015: Ricardo Vaz Tê has his contract with the club terminated.
- 8 February 2015: Ravel Morrison has his contract terminated with immediate effect.
- 18 February 2015: Nenê joins the club until the end of the season with an option on 2015–16.
- 6 May 2015: Aaron Cresswell is named Hammer of the Year.

== Squad ==
=== First team squad ===
Squad No.	Name	Nationality	Position (s)	Date of birth (age)	Signed from
Goalkeepers
13	Adrián	(Spain)	GK	3 January 1987 (age 39)	(Spain) Real Betis
22	Jussi Jääskeläinen	(Finland)	GK	19 April 1975 (age 51)	(England) Bolton Wanderers
34	Raphael Spiegel	(Switzerland)	GK	19 December 1992 (age 33)	(Switzerland) Grasshoppers
Defenders
2	Winston Reid	(New Zealand)	CB	3 July 1988 (age 38)	(Denmark) Midtjylland
3	Aaron Cresswell	(England)	LB	15 December 1989 (age 36)	(England) Ipswich Town
5	James Tomkins	(England)	CB	29 March 1989 (age 37)	(England) Academy
17	Joey O'Brien	(Republic of Ireland)	RB	17 February 1986 (age 40)	(England) Bolton Wanderers
18	Carl Jenkinson	(England)	RB	8 February 1992 (age 34)	(England) Arsenal (On loan)
19	James Collins	(Wales)	CB	23 August 1983 (age 43)	(England) Aston Villa
20	Guy Demel	(Ivory Coast)	CB	13 June 1981 (age 45)	(Germany) Hamburg
32	Reece Burke	(England)	CB	2 September 1996 (age 30)	(England) Academy
33	Dan Potts	(England)	LB	13 April 1994 (age 32)	(England) Academy
Midfielders
4	Kevin Nolan	(England)	CM	24 June 1982 (age 44)	(England) Newcastle United
7	Matt Jarvis	(England)	LM	22 May 1986 (age 40)	(England) Wolverhampton Wanderers
8	Cheikhou Kouyaté	(Senegal)	DM	21 December 1989 (age 36)	(Belgium) Anderlecht
11	Stewart Downing	(England)	AM	22 July 1984 (age 42)	(England) Liverpool
16	Mark Noble	(England)	DM	8 May 1987 (age 39)	(England) Academy
21	Morgan Amalfitano	(France)	AM	20 March 1985 (age 41)	(France) Marseille
23	Diego Poyet	(Uruguay)	DM	8 April 1995 (age 31)	(England) Charlton Athletic
30	Alex Song	(Cameroon)	DM	9 September 1987 (age 39)	(Spain) Barcelona (On loan)
Forwards
9	Andy Carroll	(England)	ST	6 January 1989 (age 37)	(England) Liverpool
12	Nenê	(Brazil)	SS	19 July 1981 (age 45)	Free Agent
15	Diafra Sakho	(Senegal)	ST	24 December 1989 (age 36)	(France) Metz
24	Carlton Cole	(England)	ST	12 October 1983 (age 43)	Free Agent
31	Enner Valencia	(Ecuador)	ST	4 November 1989 (age 37)	(Mexico) Pachuca

=== Squad statistics ===
As of 1 February 2015

No.	Pos.	Name	League			FA Cup			League Cup			Total			Discipline	
No.	Pos.	Name	Apps	Goals	Assists	Apps	Goals	Assists	Apps	Goals	Assists	Apps	Goals	Assists	Yellow card	Red card
2	DF	(New Zealand) Winston Reid	29+1	1	0	2	0	0	1	0	0	32+1	1	0	10	0
3	DF	(England) Aaron Cresswell	38	2	4	4	0	0	0	0	0	42	2	4	5	0
4	MF	(England) Kevin Nolan	19+10	1	1	3+1	0	0	0	0	0	22+11	1	1	4	0
5	DF	(England) James Tomkins	20+2	1	3	3	0	1	0	0	0	23+2	1	4	6	0
7	MF	(England) Matt Jarvis	4+7	0	0	2	0	0	0	0	0	6+7	0	0	0	0
8	MF	(Senegal) Cheikhou Kouyaté	30+1	4	2	1	0	0	0	0	0	31+1	4	2	5	0
9	FW	(England) Andy Carroll	12+2	5	1	2	0	2	0	0	0	14+2	5	3	2	0
11	MF	(England) Stewart Downing	37	6	8	4	0	0	0+1	0	0	41+1	6	8	3	0
13	GK	(Spain) Adrián	38	0	0	4	0	0	0	0	0	42	0	0	3	1
15	FW	(Senegal) Diafra Sakho	20+3	10	2	1+1	1	0	1	1	0	22+4	12	2	2	0
16	MF	(England) Mark Noble	27+1	2	3	4	0	0	0+1	0	0	31+2	2	3	5	0
17	DF	(Republic of Ireland) Joey O'Brien	6+3	0	0	0+2	0	0	0	0	0	6+5	0	0	2	0
18	DF	(England) Carl Jenkinson	29+3	0	2	4	0	0	0	0	0	33+3	0	2	2	0
19	DF	(Wales) James Collins	21+6	0	0	2	1	0	0	0	0	23+6	1	0	6	1
20	DF	(Ivory Coast) Guy Demel	3+3	0	0	0+1	0	0	1	0	0	4+4	0	0	0	0
21	MF	(France) Morgan Amalfitano	14+10	3	1	1+3	0	1	0	0	0	15+13	3	2	4	1
22	GK	(Finland) Jussi Jääskeläinen	0+1	0	0	0	0	0	1	0	0	1+1	0	0	0	0
23	MF	(Uruguay) Diego Poyet	1+2	0	0	0+1	0	0	1	0	0	3+2	0	0	1	0
24	FW	(England) Carlton Cole	8+15	2	0	0+3	1	0	0	0	0	8+18	3	0	3	0
30	MF	(Cameroon) Alex Song	25+3	0	3	3	0	0	0	0	0	28+3	0	3	4	0
31	FW	(Ecuador) Enner Valencia	25+7	4	4	4	1	0	1	0	0	30+7	5	4	2	0
32	DF	(England) Reece Burke	4+1	0	0	0	0	0	1	0	1	5+1	0	1	0	0
33	DF	(England) Dan Potts	0	0	0	0	0	0	1	0	0	1	0	0	0	0
–	–	Own goals	–	1	–	-	0	-	–	1	–	-	2	-	–	–

Players who left the club during the season:

No.	Pos.	Name	League			FA Cup			League Cup			Total			Discipline	
No.	Pos.	Name	Apps	Goals	Assists	Apps	Goals	Assists	Apps	Goals	Assists	Apps	Goals	Assists	Yellow card	Red card
12	FW	(Portugal) Ricardo Vaz Tê	3+1	0	0	0	0	0	1	0	0	5	0	0	0	0
21	MF	(Senegal) Mohamed Diamé	0+3	0	0	0	0	0	1	0	0	4	0	0	0	0
14	MF	(England) Ravel Morrison	0+1	0	0	0	0	0	1	0	0	2	0	0	1	0
10	FW	(Argentina) Mauro Zárate	5+2	2	1	0	0	0	0+1	0	0	8	2	1	1	0

=== Goalscorers ===
As of 17 May 2015

Rank	Pos	No.	Nat	Name	Premier League	FA Cup	League Cup	Total
1	FW	15	(Senegal)	Diafra Sakho	10	1	1	12
2	MF	11	(England)	Stewart Downing	6	0	0	6
3	FW	9	(England)	Andy Carroll	5	0	0	5
3	FW	31	(Ecuador)	Enner Valencia	4	1	0	5
5	DF	8	(Senegal)	Cheikhou Kouyaté	4	0	0	4
6	MF	21	(France)	Morgan Amalfitano	3	0	0	3
6	FW	24	(England)	Carlton Cole	2	1	0	3
8	DF	3	(England)	Aaron Cresswell	2	0	0	2
8	FW	10	(Argentina)	Mauro Zárate	2	0	0	2
8	MF	16	(England)	Mark Noble	2	0	0	2
11	DF	2	(New Zealand)	Winston Reid	1	0	0	1
11	MF	4	(England)	Kevin Nolan	1	0	0	1
11	DF	5	(England)	James Tomkins	1	0	0	1
11	DF	19	(Wales)	James Collins	0	1	0	1
Own goals					1	0	0	1
TOTALS					44	4	1	49

=== Disciplinary record ===
R.	No.	Name	Premier League			FA Cup			League Cup			Total		
R.	No.	Name	Yellow card	(yellow card) (yellow-red card)	Red card	Yellow card	(yellow card) (yellow-red card)	Red card	Yellow card	(yellow card) (yellow-red card)	Red card	Yellow card	(yellow card) (yellow-red card)	Red card
1	19	(Wales) James Collins	3	1	0	0	0	0	0	0	0	3	1	0
2	2	(New Zealand) Winston Reid	5	0	0	0	0	0	0	0	0	5	0	0
3	5	(England) James Tomkins	4	0	0	0	0	0	0	0	0	4	0	0
4	3	(England) Aaron Cresswell	2	0	0	0	0	0	0	0	0	2	0	0
4	8	(Senegal) Cheikhou Kouyaté	2	0	0	0	0	0	0	0	0	2	0	0
4	13	(Spain) Adrián	2	0	0	0	0	0	0	0	0	2	0	0
4	17	(Republic of Ireland) Joey O'Brien	2	0	0	0	0	0	0	0	0	2	0	0
4	30	(Cameroon) Alex Song	2	0	0	0	0	0	0	0	0	2	0	0
9	14	(England) Ravel Morrison	0	0	0	0	0	0	1	0	0	1	0	0
9	15	(Senegal) Diafra Sakho	1	0	0	0	0	0	0	0	0	1	0	0
9	18	(England) Carl Jenkinson	1	0	0	0	0	0	0	0	0	1	0	0
9	21	(France) Morgan Amalfitano	1	0	0	0	0	0	0	0	0	1	0	0
Total			21	1	0	0	0	0	1	0	0	22	1	0

Last updated: 24 November 2014
Source: http://www.statbunker.com/competitions/TopYellowCards?comp_id=481&club_id=21

== Coaching staff ==
Position	Staff
Assistant manager	(England) Neil McDonald
First team coach	(England) Ian Hendon
Goalkeeping coach	(England) Bobby Mimms
Development coach	(England) Steve Potts
Director of youth academy	(England) Terry Westley
Head of sports medicine	(England) Dominic Rogan
Fitness Coach	Eamon Swift

Last updated: 24 May 2015
Source: West Ham United F.C.#Current staff

== Pre-season ==
West Ham played their first ever games in the country, on a pre-season tour of New Zealand. In July 2014 they played Wellington Phoenix at Eden Park, Auckland on 23 July and Sydney FC at Wellington's Westpac Stadium on 26 July. While in the country, the squad met with a huge fan base, including many from Australia-based supporters group Sydney Hammers. They also competed in the pre-season 2014 Schalke 04 Cup in August in Germany. Other teams competing were Newcastle United, Schalke 04 and Málaga.

On 28 June, it was announced that West Ham would participate in the inaugural Absolute Sports Travel Cup hosted by Football League Two side Cambridge United. They along with the hosts were joined by La Liga side Espanyol and Ukrainian Premier League side Shakhtar Donetsk. The fixtures for the pre-season tournament were released on 2 July, West Ham would face Shakhtar Donetsk on 19 July and Espanyol on 20 July.

12 July 2014	Stevenage	2–2	West Ham United	Stevenage
15:00 BST	Pett 32'; Trialist 77'	Report	Jarvis 86'; Downing 90+1'	Stadium: Broadhall Way; Attendance: 3,811; Referee: Darren Deadman

16 July 2014	Ipswich Town	0–0	West Ham United	Ipswich
19:45 BST		Report		Stadium: Portman Road; Attendance: 8,976; Referee: Darren Deadman

=== Absolute Sports Travel Cup ===
19 July 2014	West Ham United	0–0	Shakhtar Donetsk	Cambridge, England
		Report		Stadium: R Costings Abbey Stadium

20 July 2014	Espanyol	2–4	West Ham United	Cambridge, England
	Sales 27'; Raillo 66'	Report	McCallum 30'; Lee 63', 68'; Cullen 72'	Stadium: R Costings Abbey Stadium

=== Football United Tour ===
23 July 2014	Wellington Phoenix	2–1	West Ham United	Auckland, New Zealand
08:30 BST	Durante 11'; Gorrin 27'	Report	Zárate 70'	Stadium: Eden Park; Attendance: 19,183

26 July 2014	Sydney FC	3–1	West Ham United	Wellington, New Zealand
03.00 BST	Gameiro 4', 64'; Brosque 26'	Report	Petković 50' (o.g.)	Stadium: Westpac Stadium

Rank	Team	Win (3)	Loss (0)	Goals for	Goals ag.	Differ.	Points
1	Newcastle United	2	0	5	0	+5	6
2	Wellington Phoenix	1	1	2	2	0	3
3	Sydney FC	1	1	3	5	-2	3
4	West Ham United	0	2	2	5	-3	0

=== Schalke 04 Cup ===
Matches were played over 90 minutes, with no added time. If the scores were level, then a penalty shoot-out would determine the winner, gaining two points in the process. Winners within 90 minutes received three points. West Ham were successful from the spot in their first meeting against Schalke 04 but were beaten within 90 minutes by La Liga side Málaga, 2–0.

2 August 2014	Schalke 04	0–0 (6–7 p)	West Ham United	Gelsenkirchen, Germany
16:45 BST		Report		Stadium: Veltins-Arena
	Penalties
	Neustädter (penalty scored); Meyer (penalty scored); Papadopoulos (penalty scored); Santana (penalty missed); Aogo (penalty scored); Itter (penalty scored); Sobottka (penalty scored); Borgmann (penalty missed)		Nolan (penalty scored); Collins (penalty scored); Vaz Tê (penalty missed); Lee (penalty scored); Poyet (penalty scored); O'Brien (penalty scored); Potts (penalty scored); Lletget (penalty scored)

3 August 2014	Málaga	2–0	West Ham United	Gelsenkirchen, Germany
14:30 BST	Rescaldani 22'; Luis Alberto 24'			Stadium: Veltins-Arena; Referee: Arne Aarnink

Rank	Team	Win (3)	Pk win (2)	Pk loss (0)	Loss (0)	Goals for	Goals ag.	Differ.	Points
1	Málaga	2	0	0	0	5	1	+4	6
2	Newcastle United	1	0	0	1	4	4	0	3
3	West Ham United	0	1	0	1	0	2	-2	2
4	Schalke 04	0	0	1	1	1	3	-2	0

=== Marathonbet Cup ===
West Ham faced Italian Serie A side Sampdoria in their final pre-season friendly at the Boleyn Ground. They found themselves 0–1 down approaching half time, but a Mark Noble penalty made it 1–1. A fine individual goal from Mohamed Diamé levelled the game at 2–2 in the second half before the winner in the 90th minute, courtesy of youngster Reece Burke.

9 August 2014	West Ham United	3–2	Sampdoria	London
15:00 BST	Noble 45+1' (pen.); Diamé 77'; Burke 90'	Report	Okaka 16'; Éder 61'	Stadium: Boleyn Ground; Attendance: 13,693

== Competitions ==
=== Premier League ===
==== August ====
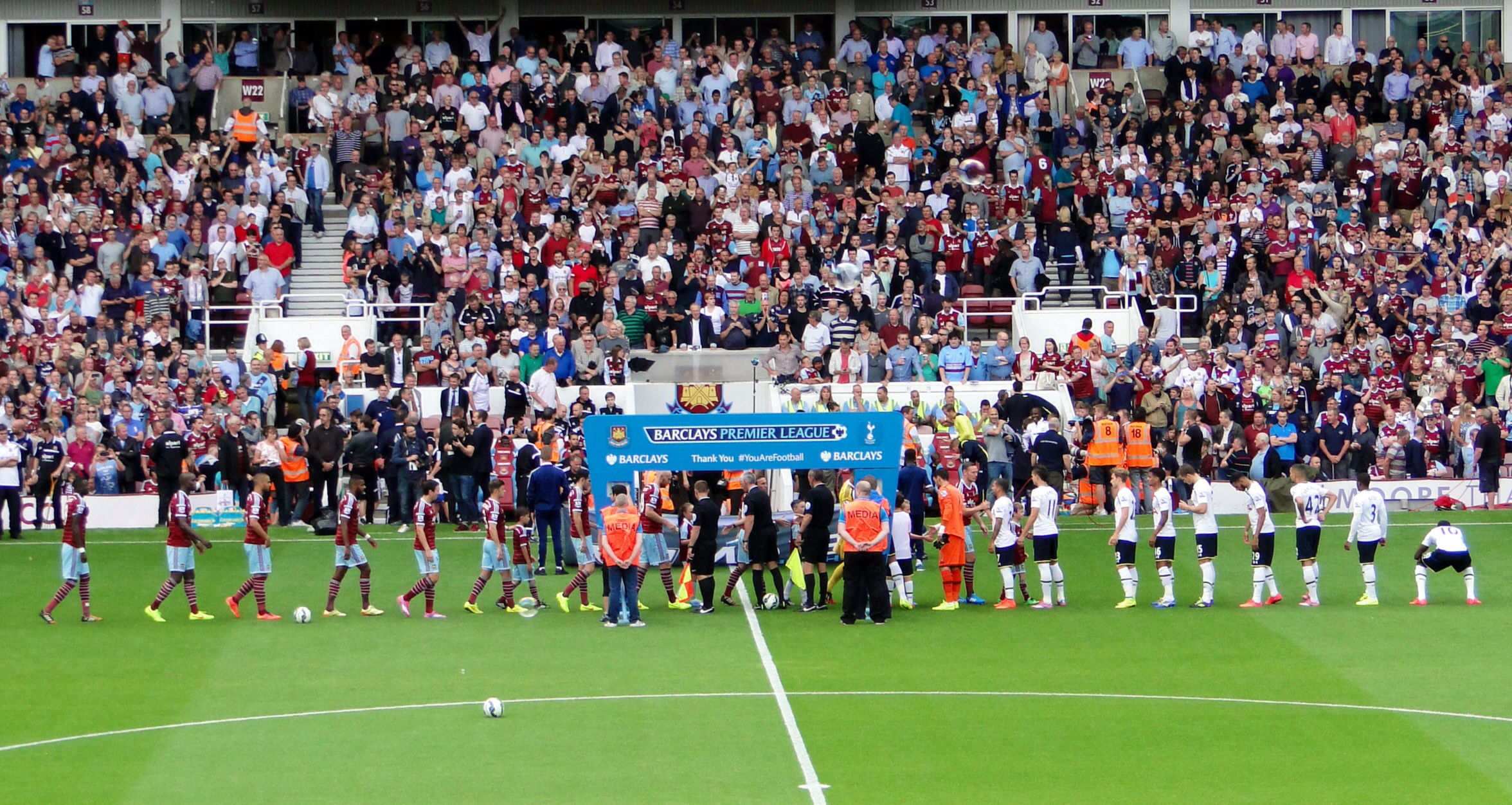
The players before the game, West Ham vs Tottenham

West Ham opened the season at home to Tottenham Hotspur, whom they defeated three times last season in all competitions. It was an eventful game, seeing Mark Noble miss a penalty for the first time since 2009. Both sides went down to ten men after James Collins picked up two yellow cards, whilst Kyle Naughton saw straight red for handling the ball in the penalty area. Eric Dier scored his first competitive goal for Spurs in stoppage time to pick up all three points for the North London club. Next up for the Hammers was an away trip to managerless Crystal Palace. Mauro Zárate hit a spectacular volley to register his first West Ham goal and there were also goals from Stewart Downing and Carlton Cole. Senegalese player Diafra Sakho and Diego Poyet, son of Gus, also made their debuts. Southampton was the next challenge and the last game before the international break. The club unveiled Barcelona and Cameroon midfielder Alex Song before kick off, who joined for a season-long loan. Mark Noble put West Ham a goal up before half time but Southampton scored two second half goals to take all three points back to the South Coast. They finished the month in 11th place.

==== September ====
West Ham played Hull City in their first game during September. A 2–2 draw at the KC Stadium produced a debut goal for Enner Valencia and club debut's for Carl Jenkinson, Morgan Amalfitano and Alex Song. The club's second win of the season came at home to Liverpool. Morgan Amalfitano scored his first goal for the club in a 3–1 win. Despite captain Wayne Rooney seeing red, West Ham could not overcome the ten men of Manchester United, losing 2–1.

==== October ====
The first of a three-game winning streak came at home against struggling QPR in a 2–0 win that saw the club move up to seventh. Diafro Sakho scored his third consecutive league goal. A second-straight win came against promoted side Burnley. Sakho scored his fourth consecutive league goal and helped move West Ham to fourth in the table on the eve of Sam Allardyce's 60th birthday. West Ham secured their third-straight win and a 100% win rate for October in a 2–1 home win against reigning Premier League champions Manchester City. Sakho scored his fifth consecutive league goal and his sixth in a row in all competitions, breaking a club record.

==== November ====
West Ham visited Stoke City and salvaged a point after being 2–0 down to draw 2–2, taking their unbeaten run to four games. Sakho was unable to continue his run of scoring in consecutive matches following an injury sustained in the Manchester City match. Aston Villa was next to visit the Boleyn Ground, a match that ended 0–0. This result extended West Ham's unbeaten run to five games and also saw the return of Andy Carroll following several months out through injury. The club went into the November international break in fourth place.

==== December ====
The visit of Swansea City on 7 December produced a 3–1 win for West Ham, placing them in third place in the Premier League. On 20 December, West Ham beat Leicester City 2–0 to place them in the top four of the league at Christmas, the first time this has occurred since the 1985–86 season. West Ham lost their next two games, 2–0 away to Chelsea and 1–2 at home to Arsenal to be placed sixth at the end of the calendar year.

==== January ====
West Ham won a single game from four played in January; a 3–0 home win against Hull City. Two draws, against West Bromwich Albion and Swansea City and a defeat at Anfield against Liverpool completed the month's results in the league.

==== February ====
With no wins, three draws, against Manchester United, Southampton and Tottenham Hotspur, and a defeat, against Crystal Palace, in February, West Ham slipped to ninth in the league.

==== March ====
With three league games played in March, West Ham won one, a 1–0 home win against Sunderland with the goal being scored by Diafra Sakho in the 88th minute.

==== April ====
West Ham played four games in April and won none of them. The games included two defeats and two draws including an away defeat to Leicester City, at the time at the bottom of the league.

==== Matches ====
The fixtures for the 2014–15 season were announced on 18 June 2014 at 9am.

==== Results by matchday ====
Matchday	1	2	3	4	5	6	7	8	9	10	11	12	13	14	15	16	17	18	19	20	21	22	23	24	25	26	27	28	29	30	31	32	33	34	35	36	37	38
Ground	H	A	H	A	H	A	H	A	H	A	H	A	H	A	H	A	H	A	H	H	A	H	A	H	A	A	H	H	A	H	A	H	A	A	H	A	H	A
Result	L	W	L	D	W	L	W	W	W	D	D	L	W	W	W	D	W	L	L	D	D	W	L	D	D	D	L	L	L	W	L	D	L	D	W	L	L	L
Position	18	8	11	13	8	13	7	4	4	5	4	6	5	5	4	4	4	5	6	7	7	7	8	8	8	8	9	10	10	9	9	9	10	11	9	10	11	12

Source: worldfootball.net
A = Away; H = Home; W = Win; D = Draw; L = Loss

16 August 2014 1	West Ham United	0–1	Tottenham Hotspur	London
15:00	Collins (yellow card) 54' (yellow-red card) 63'; Kouyaté (yellow card) 90+2'	Report	Naughton (red card) 29'; Dier 90+3'	Stadium: Boleyn Ground; Attendance: 34,977; Referee: Chris Foy

23 August 2014 2	Crystal Palace	1–3	West Ham United	London
15:00	Chamakh 48'; Jedinak (yellow card) 89'	Report	Zárate 34'; Downing 37'; Reid (yellow card) 40'; Tomkins (yellow card) 45+1'; Cole 62'; O'Brien (yellow card) 75'	Stadium: Selhurst Park; Attendance: 24,242; Referee: Mark Clattenburg

30 August 2014 3	West Ham United	1–3	Southampton	London
15:00	Noble 27'; Cresswell (yellow card) 56'; O'Brien (yellow card) 62'	Report	Schneiderlin 45', 68'; Pellè (yellow card) 79', (goal) 83'	Stadium: Boleyn Ground; Attendance: 34,907; Referee: Mike Dean

15 September 2014 4	Hull City	2–2	West Ham United	Kingston upon Hull
20:00	Hernández 39'; Huddlestone (yellow card) 54'; Robertson (yellow card) 60'; Diamé 64'; Livermore (yellow card) 90+3'	Report	Valencia 50'; Sakho 67'. Reid (yellow card) 90+4'	Stadium: KC Stadium; Attendance: 21,275; Referee: Martin Atkinson

20 September 2014 5	West Ham United	3–1	Liverpool	London
17:30	Reid 2', (yellow card) 4'; Sakho 7'; Adrián (yellow card) 17'; Kouyaté (yellow card) 28'; Jenkinson (yellow card) 66'; Amalfitano 88'	Report	Balotelli (yellow card) 17'; Sterling 27'	Stadium: Boleyn Ground; Attendance: 34,977; Referee: Craig Pawson

27 September 2014 6	Manchester United	2–1	West Ham United	Manchester
15:00	Rooney 5', (red card) 59'; Van Persie 22'; Herrera (yellow card) 48'	Report	Song (yellow card) 3'; Sakho 37', (yellow card) 72'; Adrián (yellow card) 90+1'	Stadium: Old Trafford; Attendance: 75,317; Referee: Lee Mason

5 October 2014 7	West Ham United	2–0	Queens Park Rangers	London
16:15	Onuoha 5' (o.g.); Tomkins (yellow card) 49'; Sakho 59'; Cresswell (yellow card) 83'	Report	Sandro (yellow card) 14'; Henry (yellow card) 89'	Stadium: Boleyn Ground; Attendance: 34,907; Referee: Anthony Taylor

18 October 2014 8	Burnley	1–3	West Ham United	Burnley
15:00	Boyd 60'	Report	Reid (yellow card) 34'; Sakho 49'; Valencia 54'; Cole 70'	Stadium: Turf Moor; Attendance: 18,936; Referee: Kevin Friend

25 October 2014 9	West Ham United	2–1	Manchester City	London
12:45	Amalfitano (yellow card) 7', (goal) 21'; Song (yellow card) 47'; Sakho 75'	Report	Kompany (yellow card) 44'; Silva 77'	Stadium: Boleyn Ground; Attendance: 34,977; Referee: Martin Atkinson

1 November 2014 10	Stoke City	2–2	West Ham United	Stoke-on-Trent
15:00	Moses 33'; Sidwell (yellow card) 54'; Diouf 56'	Report	Valencia 60'; Collins (yellow card) 66'; Downing 73'	Stadium: Britannia Stadium; Attendance: 27,174; Referee: Chris Foy

8 November 2014 11	West Ham United	0–0	Aston Villa	London
15:00		Report	Cleverley (yellow card) 69'; Weimann (yellow card) 69'	Stadium: Boleyn Ground; Attendance: 34,857; Referee: Jonathan Moss

22 November 2014 12	Everton	2–1	West Ham United	Liverpool
15:00	Lukaku 26'; Osman 73'	Report	Zárate 56'	Stadium: Goodison Park; Attendance: 39,182; Referee: Mark Clattenburg

29 November 2014 13	West Ham United	1–0	Newcastle United	London
15:00	Cresswell 56'	Report	Sissoko (yellow card) 75' (yellow-red card) 76'	Stadium: Boleyn Ground; Attendance: 34,977; Referee: Mike Dean

2 December 2014 14	West Bromwich Albion	1–2	West Ham United	West Bromwich
20:00	Dawson 10'; Brunt (yellow card) 34'; Sessègnon (yellow card) 70'	Report	Tomkins (yellow card) 18', (goal) 45'; Nolan 35'	Stadium: The Hawthorns; Attendance: 23,975; Referee: Mike Jones

7 December 2014 15	West Ham United	3–1	Swansea City	London
13:30	Carroll 41', 66'; Sakho 87'	Report	Bony 19'; Routledge (yellow card) 49'; Fabiański (red card) 68'	Stadium: Boleyn Ground; Attendance: 34,125; Referee: Chris Foy

13 December 2014 16	Sunderland	1–1	West Ham United	Sunderland
15:00	Gómez 22' (pen.), (yellow card) 57'; Wickham (yellow card) 82'	Report	Downing 29', (yellow card) 80'; Reid (yellow card) 40'	Stadium: Stadium of Light; Attendance: 41,694; Referee: Phil Dowd

20 December 2014 17	West Ham United	2–0	Leicester City	London
15:00	Carroll 24'; Downing 56'	Report	King (yellow card) 33'; Vardy (yellow card) 41'; Ulloa (yellow card) 64'	Stadium: Boleyn Ground; Attendance: 34,977; Referee: Martin Atkinson

26 December 2014 18	Chelsea	2–0	West Ham United	London
12:45	Terry 31'; Costa 62'	Report		Stadium: Stamford Bridge; Attendance: 41,589; Referee: Michael Oliver

28 December 2014 19	West Ham United	1–2	Arsenal	London
15:00	Kouyaté 54'	Report	Cazorla 41' (pen.); Welbeck 44'	Stadium: Boleyn Ground; Attendance: 34,977; Referee: Neil Swarbrick

1 January 2015 20	West Ham United	1–1	West Bromwich Albion	London
15:00	Sakho 10'	Report	Berahino 42'	Stadium: Boleyn Ground; Attendance: 34,914; Referee: Jonathan Moss

10 January 2015 21	Swansea City	1–1	West Ham United	Swansea
15:00	Noble 74' (o.g.)	Report	Carroll 43'	Stadium: Liberty Stadium; Attendance: 20,745; Referee: Mike Dean

18 January 2015 22	West Ham United	3–0	Hull City	London
13:30	Noble (yellow card) 21'; Carroll 49'; Amalfitano 69'; Downing 72'	Report	Elmohamady (yellow card) 34'; Quinn (yellow card) 75'; Meyler (yellow card) 87'	Stadium: Boleyn Ground; Attendance: 34,914; Referee: Martin Atkinson

31 January 2015 23	Liverpool	2–0	West Ham United	Liverpool
15:00	Sterling 51'; Sturridge 80'	Report		Stadium: Anfield; Attendance: 44,718; Referee: Andre Marriner

8 February 2015 24	West Ham United	1–1	Manchester United	London
16:15	Kouyaté 49'; Song (yellow card) 73'	Report	Rojo (yellow card) 43'; Shaw (yellow card) 83' (yellow-red card) 90+3'; Rooney (yellow card) 83'; Blind 90+2'	Stadium: Boleyn Ground; Attendance: 34,499; Referee: Mark Clattenburg

11 February 2015 25	Southampton	0–0	West Ham United	Southampton
19:45 GMT	Mané (yellow card) 39'; Fonte (yellow card) 42'	Report	Cole (yellow card) 50'; Adrián (red card) 61'	Stadium: St Mary's Stadium; Attendance: 31,241; Referee: Craig Pawson

22 February 2015 26	Tottenham Hotspur	2–2	West Ham United	London
12:00 GMT	Rose 81'; Kane 90+6'	Report	Kouyaté 22'; Noble (yellow card) 45+1'; Cresswell (yellow card) 51'; Sakho 62'	Stadium: White Hart Lane; Attendance: 35,837; Referee: Jonathan Moss

28 February 2015 27	West Ham United	1–3	Crystal Palace	London
12:45 GMT	Tomkins (yellow card) 59'; Valencia (yellow card) 65' (goal) 76'	Report	Murray (yellow card) 23' (yellow-red card) 69' (goal) 41', 63'; Dann 51'; Ward (yellow card) 53'; Delaney (yellow card) 84'	Stadium: Boleyn Ground; Attendance: 34,857; Referee: Mike Dean

4 March 2015 28	West Ham United	0–1	Chelsea	London
19:45 GMT		Report	Hazard 22'	Stadium: Boleyn Ground; Attendance: 34,927; Referee: Andre Marriner

14 March 2015 29	Arsenal	3–0	West Ham United	London
15:00 GMT	Sánchez (yellow card) 36'; Giroud 45+1'; Ramsey 81'; Flamini 84'	Report	Sakho (yellow card) 78'	Stadium: Emirates Stadium; Attendance: 60,002; Referee: Anthony Taylor

21 March 2015 30	West Ham United	1–0	Sunderland	London
17:30 GMT	Sakho 88'	Report		Stadium: Boleyn Ground; Attendance: 34,914; Referee: Lee Mason

4 April 2015 31	Leicester City	2–1	West Ham United	Leicester
15:00 BST	Cambiasso 12'; King 86'	Report	Jenkinson (yellow card) 14'; Kouyaté 32'; Reid (yellow card) 53'; Cresswell (yellow card) 85'	Stadium: King Power Stadium; Attendance: 31,863; Referee: Mark Clattenburg

11 April 2015 32	West Ham United	1–1	Stoke City	London
15:00 BST	Cresswell 7'; Collins (yellow card) 21'; Nolan (yellow card) 80'; Cole (yellow card) 85'	Report	Pieters (yellow card) 73'; Arnautović 90+5'	Stadium: Boleyn Ground; Attendance: 34,946; Referee: Roger East

19 April 2015 33	Manchester City	2–0	West Ham United	Manchester
13:30 BST	Collins 18' (o.g.); Agüero 36'	Report		Stadium: City of Manchester Stadium; Attendance: 45,041; Referee: Anthony Taylor

25 April 2015 34	Queens Park Rangers	0–0	West Ham United	London
15:00 BST	Austin (yellow card) 77'	Report		Stadium: Loftus Road; Attendance: 18,036; Referee: Mike Jones

2 May 2015 35	West Ham United	1–0	Burnley	London
15:00 BST	Noble 24' (pen.), (yellow card) 44'; Valencia (yellow card) 41'; Downing (yellow card) 60'	Report	Duff (red card) 23'; Wallace (yellow card) 84'; Mee (yellow card) 90+3'	Stadium: Boleyn Ground; Attendance: 34,946; Referee: Jonathan Moss

9 May 2015 36	Aston Villa	1–0	West Ham United	Birmingham
15:00 BST	Cleverley 31'	Report		Stadium: Villa Park; Attendance: 39,294; Referee: Lee Mason

16 May 2015 37	West Ham United	1–2	Everton	London
15:00 BST	Reid (yellow card) 26'; Downing 62'	Report	Coleman (yellow card) 32'; Barry (yellow card) 45'; Osman 68'; McCarthy (yellow card) 74'; Galloway (yellow card) 90+1'; Lukaku 90+3'	Stadium: Boleyn Ground; Attendance: 34,977; Referee: Kevin Friend

24 May 2015 38	Newcastle United	2–0	West Ham United	Newcastle upon Tyne
15:00 BST	Sissoko 54'; Gutiérrez 85'	Report	Amalfitano (yellow card) 79'	Stadium: St James' Park; Attendance: 52,034; Referee: Martin Atkinson

==== League table ====
Pos	Team	Pld	W	D	L	GF	GA	GD	Pts	Qualification or relegation
10	Crystal Palace	38	13	9	16	47	51	−4	48	
11	Everton	38	12	11	15	48	50	−2	47	
12	West Ham United	38	12	11	15	44	47	−3	47	Qualification for the Europa League first qualifying round (Note: England was given an extra qualification berth for the Europa League first qualifying round as one of the top three associations in UEFA Respect Fair Play ranking. The spot was given to West Ham United after finishing on top of the Premier League Fair Play table.)
13	West Bromwich Albion	38	11	11	16	38	51	−13	44	
14	Leicester City	38	11	8	19	46	55	−9	41	

Source: Barclays Premier League
Rules for classification: 1) Points; 2) Goal difference; 3) Goals scored; 4) Play-offs (only if needed to decide champion, teams for relegation or teams for UEFA competitions).

==== Results summary ====
Overall								Home						Away					
Pld	W	D	L	GF	GA	GD	Pts	W	D	L	GF	GA	GD	W	D	L	GF	GA	GD
38	12	11	15	44	47	−3	47	9	4	6	25	18	+7	3	7	9	19	29	−10

Last updated: 17 May 2015.
Source: Premier League

==== Results by matchday ====
Matchday	1	2	3	4	5	6	7	8	9	10	11	12	13	14	15	16	17	18	19	20	21	22	23	24	25	26	27	28	29	30	31	32	33	34	35	36	37	38
Ground	H	A	H	A	H	A	H	A	H	A	H	A	H	A	H	A	H	A	H	H	A	H	A	H	A	A	H	H	A	H	A	H	A	A	H	A	H	A
Result	L	W	L	D	W	L	W	W	W	D	D	L	W	W	W	D	W	L	L	D	D	W	L	D	D	D	L	L	L	W	L	D	L	D	W	L	L	L
Position	18	6	10	13	8	11	7	4	4	5	4	6	5	5	3	4	4	5	6	7	7	7	8	8	8	8	9	10	10	9	9	9	10	10	9	10	11	12

Updated to match(es) played on 25 May 2015. Source: Statto.com
A = Away; H = Home; W = Win; D = Draw; L = Loss

=== Football League Cup ===
26 August 2014 Second round	West Ham United	1–1 (a.e.t.) (4–5 p)	Sheffield United	London
19:45 BST	Morrison (yellow card) 36'; Sakho 40'	Report	Reid 58' (o.g.); Doyle (yellow card) 90+1'	Stadium: Boleyn Ground; Attendance: 28,930; Referee: James Linington
	Penalties
	Noble (penalty scored); Downing (penalty scored); Zárate (penalty scored); Poyet (penalty scored); Valencia (penalty missed)		Davies (penalty scored); Collins (penalty scored); McNulty (penalty scored); McEveley (penalty scored); Doyle (penalty scored)

=== FA Cup ===
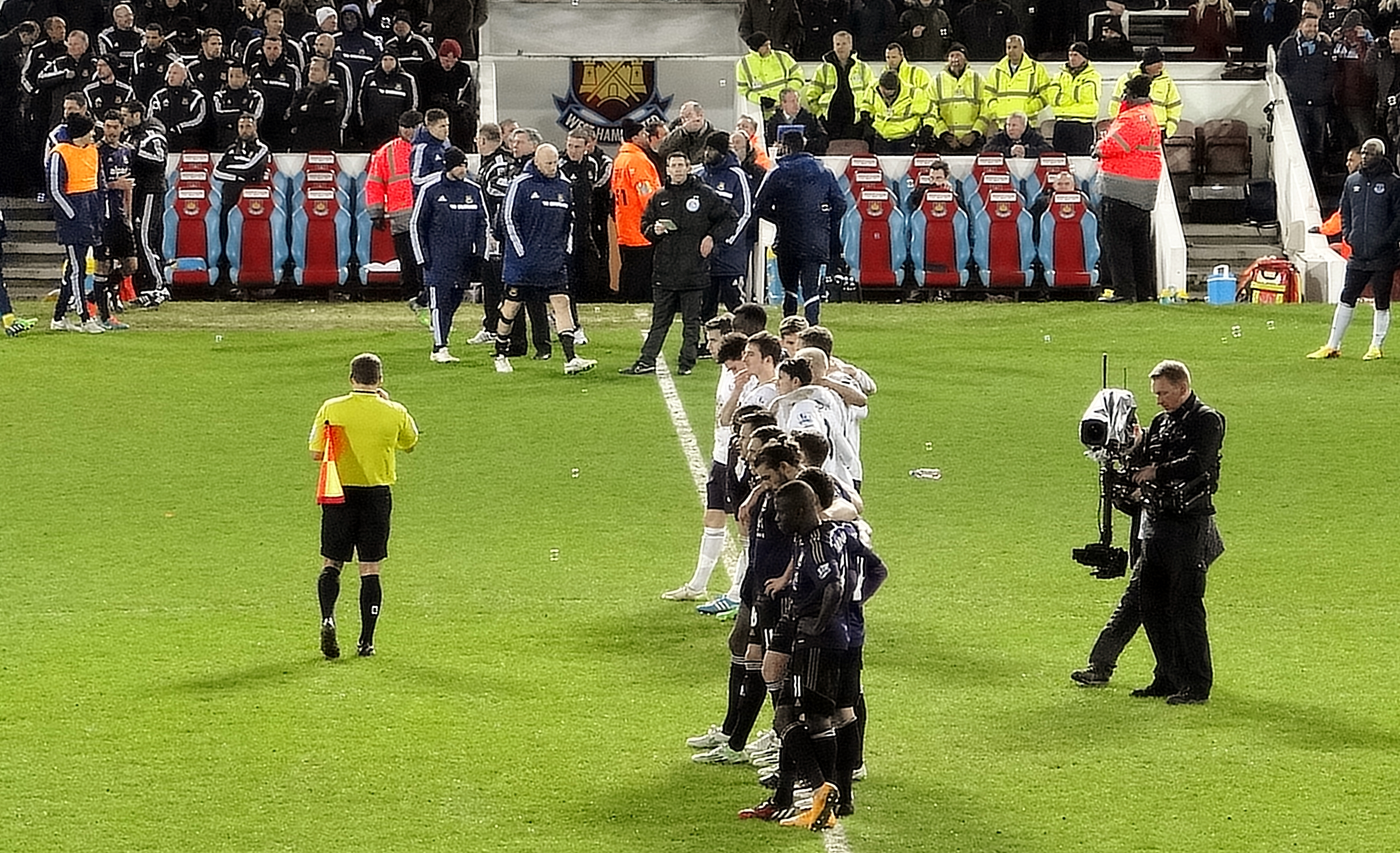
West Ham and Everton players line-up before their 3rd round replay penalty shoot-out

6 January 2015 Third round	Everton	1–1	West Ham United	Liverpool
19:45	Lukaku 90+2'	Report	Collins 56'	Stadium: Goodison Park; Attendance: 22,236; Referee: Anthony Taylor

13 January 2015 Third round replay	West Ham United	2–2 (a.e.t.) (9–8 p)	Everton	London
19:45	Valencia 51'; Cole 113'	Report	McGeady (yellow card) 40' (yellow-red card) 56'; Mirallas 82'; Lukaku 97'	Stadium: Boleyn Ground; Attendance: 25,301; Referee: Neil Swarbrick
	Penalties
	Noble (penalty scored); Nolan (penalty scored); Carroll (penalty scored); Cresswell (penalty scored); Downing (penalty missed); Cole (penalty scored); Valencia (penalty scored); Amalfitano (penalty scored); Jenkinson (penalty scored); Adrián (penalty scored)		(penalty scored) Mirallas; (penalty missed) Naismith; (penalty scored) Lukaku; (penalty scored) Baines; (penalty scored) Oviedo; (penalty scored) Barry; (penalty scored) Stones; (penalty scored) Jagielka; (penalty scored) Coleman; (penalty missed) Joel

25 January 2015 Fourth round	Bristol City	0–1	West Ham United	Bristol
14:00		Report	Sakho 81'	Stadium: Ashton Gate; Attendance: 12,682; Referee: Lee Mason

14 February 2015 Fifth round	West Bromwich Albion	4–0	West Ham United	West Bromwich
12:45	Ideye 20', 57'; Morrison 42'; Berahino 72'	Report	Amalfitano (yellow card) 70' (yellow-red card) 70'	Stadium: The Hawthorns; Attendance: 19,956; Referee: Martin Atkinson

== Transfers ==
=== Summer ===
==== In ====
Pos	Player	From	Fee	Date	Ref.
FW	(Argentina) Mauro Zárate	(Argentina) Vélez Sarsfield	Undisclosed	28 May 2014	
MF	(Senegal) Cheikhou Kouyaté	(Belgium) Anderlecht	Undisclosed	18 June 2014	
DF	(England) Aaron Cresswell	(England) Ipswich Town	Undisclosed	3 July 2014	
MF	(England) Diego Poyet	(England) Charlton Athletic	Compensation	8 July 2014	
FW	(Ecuador) Enner Valencia	(Mexico) Pachuca	Undisclosed	17 July 2014	
DF	(England) Carl Jenkinson	(England) Arsenal	Season-long loan	31 July 2014	
FW	(Senegal) Diafra Sakho	(France) Metz	Undisclosed	14 August 2014	
MF	(Cameroon) Alex Song	(Spain) Barcelona	Season-long loan	30 August 2014	
MF	(France) Morgan Amalfitano	(France) Marseille	Undisclosed	1 September 2014	

==== Out ====
Pos	Player	To	Fee	Date	Ref.
MF	(England) Joe Cole	(England) Aston Villa	Free	23 May 2014	
MF	(Wales) Jack Collison	(England) Ipswich Town	Free	23 May 2014	
DF	(England) Callum Driver	(England) Whitehawk	Free	23 May 2014	
DF	(Northern Ireland) George McCartney	Free Agent	Free	23 May 2014	
DF	(England) Jordan Spence	(England) Milton Keynes Dons	Free	23 May 2014	
MF	(England) Matthew Taylor	(England) Burnley	Free	4 July 2014	
DF	(England) Rob Girdlestone	(England) Chelmsford City	Free	5 July 2014	
MF	(France) Alou Diarra	(England) Charlton Athletic	Free	9 July 2014	
GK	(Switzerland) Raphael Spiegel	(England) Crawley Town	One-month loan	18 July 2014	
GK	(Republic of Ireland) Stephen Henderson	(England) Charlton Athletic	Free	21 July 2014	
MF	(England) George Moncur	(England) Colchester United	Six-month loan	7 August 2014	
FW	(Mali) Modibo Maïga	(France) Metz	Season-long loan	27 August 2014	
MF	(Senegal) Mohamed Diamé	(England) Hull City	Undisclosed	1 September 2014	
MF	(England) Matthias Fanimo	(England) Tranmere Rovers	One-month loan	11 September 2014	
FW	(Republic of Ireland) Sean Maguire	(England) Accrington Stanley	One-month loan	19 September 2014	
MF	(England) Ravel Morrison	(Wales) Cardiff City	Three-month loan	24 September 2014	
FW	(England) Elliot Lee	(England) Southend United	Three-month loan	31 October 2014	
DF	(Northern Ireland) Jamie Harney	(England) Colchester United	Two-month loan	12 November 2014	
MF	(England) George Moncur	(England) Colchester United	Undisclosed	18 November 2014	

=== Winter ===
==== In ====
Pos	Player	From	Fee	Date	Ref.
DF	(Canada) Doneil Henry	(Cyprus) Apollon Limassol	Undisclosed	3 January 2015	
SS	(Brazil) Nenê	Free Agent	Free	18 February 2015	

==== Out ====
Pos	Player	To	Fee	Date	Ref.
FW	(Argentina) Mauro Zárate	(England) Queens Park Rangers	Five-month loan	6 January 2015	
FW	(England) Paul McCallum	(England) Portsmouth	Five-month loan	15 January 2015	
FW	(Portugal) Ricardo Vaz Tê	(Turkey) Akhisar Belediyespor	Released	17 January 2015	
FW	(Republic of Ireland) Sean Maguire	(England) Accrington Stanley	One-month loan	24 January 2015	
MF	(England) Ben Marlow	Free agent	Released	27 January 2015	
DF	(Northern Ireland) Jamie Harney	(England) Colchester United	Free	28 January 2015	
MF	(England) Danny Whitehead	(England) Accrington Stanley	Released	28 January 2015	
MF	(England) Blair Turgott	(England) Coventry City	Released	2 February 2015	
MF	(England) Matthias Fanimo	Free agent	Released	2 February 2015	
FW	(Republic of Ireland) Kieran Sadlier	(Scotland) St Mirren	Released	3 February 2015	
MF	(England) Ravel Morrison	Free agent	Released	8 February 2015	
FW	(England) Elliot Lee	(England) Luton Town	One-month loan	19 February 2015	
GK	(Switzerland) Raphael Spiegel	(England) Carlisle United	One-month loan	21 February 2015	
DF	(Canada) Doneil Henry	(England) Blackburn Rovers	One-month loan	4 March 2015	
FW	(England) Jaanai Gordon	(England) Nuneaton Town	One-month loan	26 March 2015	
MF	(United States) Sebastian Lletget	(United States) LA Galaxy		8 May 2015	
