= Reece Burke =

English footballer (born 1996)

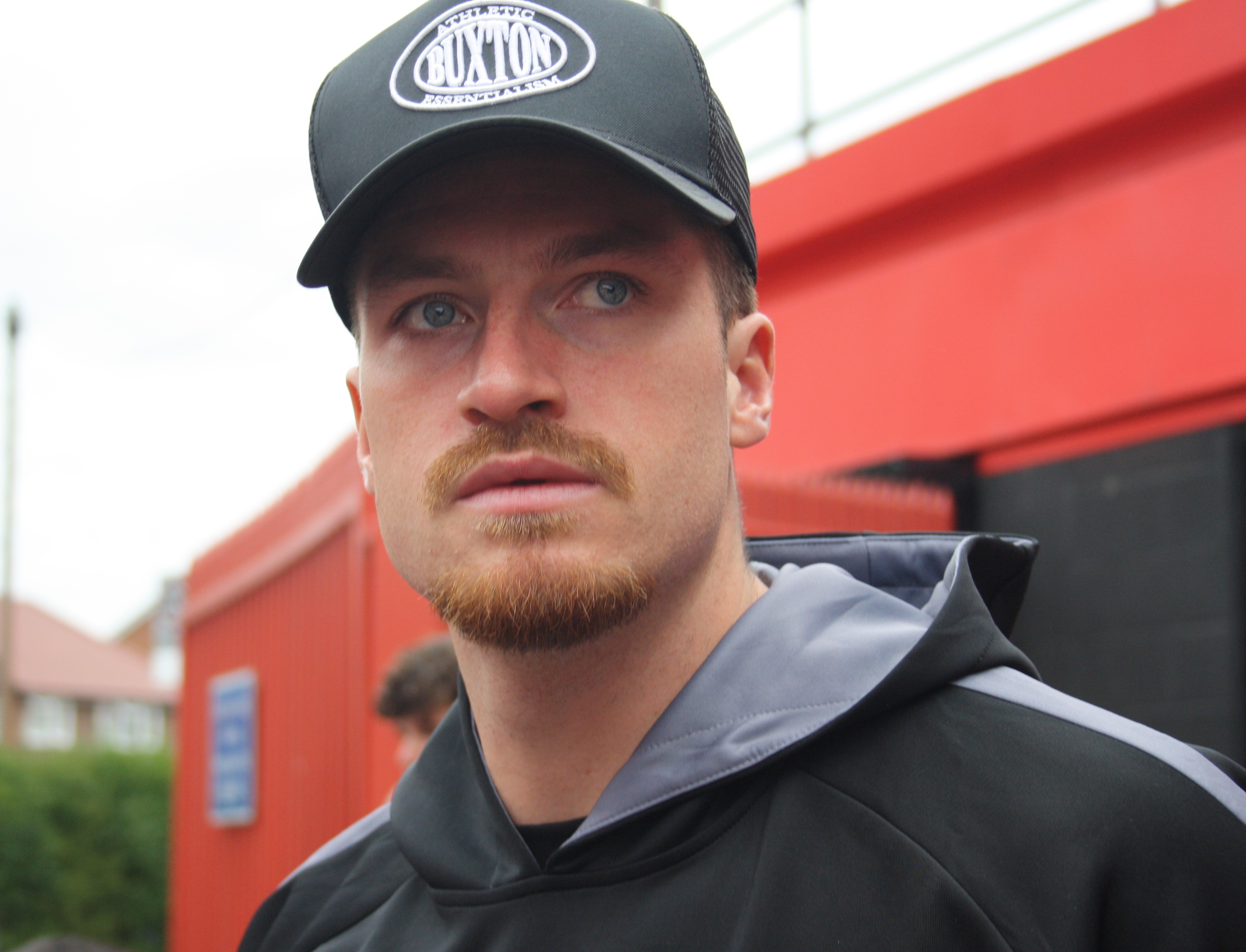
- Burke with Charlton Athletic in 2025.

Personal information
- Full name: Reece Frederick James Burke
- Date of birth: 2 September 1996 (age 30)
- Place of birth: Newham, England
- Height: 1.89 m (6 ft 2 in)
- Position: Defender

Team information
- Current team: Charlton Athletic
- Number: 4

Youth career
- 2003–2014: West Ham United

Senior career*
Years	Team	Apps	(Gls)
2014–2018	West Ham United	5	(0)
2015–2016	→ Bradford City (loan)	34	(2)
2016–2017	→ Wigan Athletic (loan)	10	(1)
2017–2018	→ Bolton Wanderers (loan)	14	(1)
2018	→ Bolton Wanderers (loan)	11	(0)
2018–2021	Hull City	104	(4)
2021–2025	Luton Town	86	(2)
2025–	Charlton Athletic	17	(1)

International career^{‡}
2013–2014	England U18	4	(0)
2014	England U19	2	(0)
2015–2016	England U20	4	(0)
- * Club domestic league appearances and goals as of 17:10, 2 May 2026 (UTC) ‡ National team caps and goals as of 14:10, 7 August 2025 (UTC)

Reece Frederick James Burke (born 2 September 1996) is an English professional footballer who plays as a defender for EFL Championship club Charlton Athletic. Mainly a centre-back, he can also play as a left-back.

A product of the West Ham United youth system, Burke has also played for Bradford City, where he was the player of the season for the 2015–16 season, and Bolton Wanderers. Internationally he has played for the England Under-18 team, England Under-19 team and England Under-20 team.

== Career ==
=== West Ham United ===
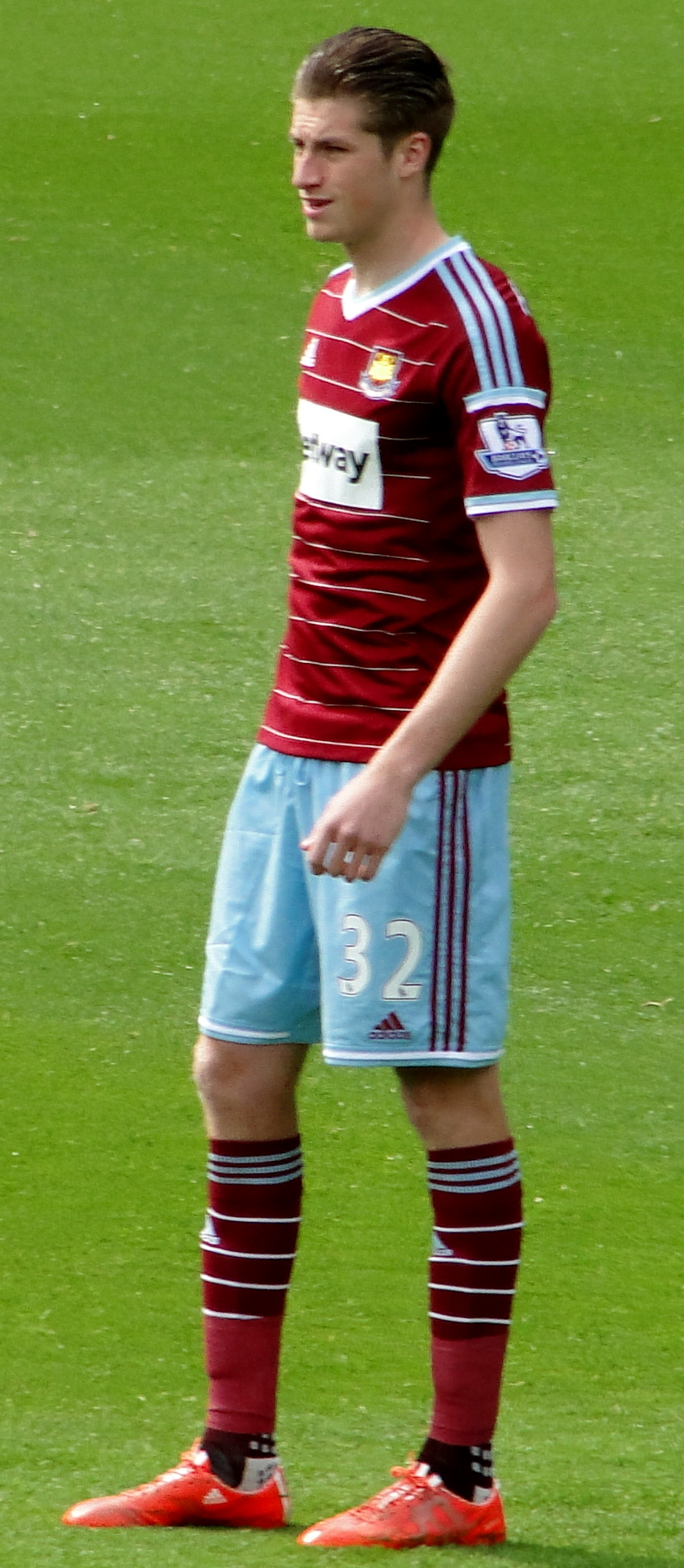
Burke with West Ham United in 2015.

Burke joined the West Ham junior team aged nine and played youth team football. He made his official debut on 5 January 2014 for West Ham against Nottingham Forest at The City Ground in the FA Cup. Forest won the game 5–0. Burke's first goal for the club came in a pre-season friendly at the Boleyn Ground against Sampdoria. He scored the winning goal in the 90th minute following a cross from fellow youth graduate Elliot Lee's cross. Burke then played the full 120 minutes against Sheffield United in the League Cup second round, with West Ham being eliminated in a penalty shootout. Burke made his Premier League debut on 25 April 2015 in a 0–0 away draw against Queens Park Rangers.

==== Loan to Bradford City ====
On 20 August 2015, Burke signed for League One side Bradford City on a one-month loan. On 5 September, Burke scored his first Bradford City and first senior goal in a 2–1 away win against Oldham Athletic. His loan was extended on 18 September for a further month and for a further month in October. In November he returned briefly to West Ham for treatment on a knee injury but returned to Bradford where his loan was extended until 2 January 2016. On 26 April 2016, Burke won a total of seven awards at Bradford City's end of season awards, including the Player of the Year award.

==== Loan to Wigan Athletic ====
Having already appeared for West Ham in their short-lived Europa League campaign at the beginning of the 2016–17 season, on 30 August 2016, Burke signed on loan for Championship team, Wigan Athletic for the remainder of the season. He scored his first goal for Wigan in a 2–1 win over Huddersfield Town on 28 November 2016.

==== Loan to Bolton Wanderers ====
On 1 August 2017, Burke, along with West Ham teammate Josh Cullen, joined Bolton Wanderers on loan until the following January.

==== Return to West Ham ====
Burke returned to West Ham in January 2018 and was immediately included in the squad for the FA Cup third round tie at Shrewsbury Town on 7 January 2018 which finished 0–0. He also started the replay at London Stadium on 16 January 2018, scoring the only goal of the game in extra time – his first senior goal for the club.

==== Return to Bolton Wanderers ====
On 31 January 2018, Burke returned to Bolton on loan.

=== Hull City ===
In July 2018, Burke joined Hull City for an undisclosed fee, believed to be £1.5 million. He signed a three-year contract with the Yorkshire club. He made his debut in the first match of the 2018–19 season on 6 August 2018 at home to Aston Villa in a 1–3 defeat. Burke scored his first goal for Hull in the FA Cup first round match on 7 November 2020 against Fleetwood Town, helping them to a 2–0 win.

=== Luton Town ===
On 2 June 2021, Burke signed a contract with Luton Town to join the club at the end of the month. He signed on a free transfer.

=== Charlton Athletic ===
On 9 July 2025, Burke joined Charlton Athletic on a two-year contract for an undisclosed fee. He scored his first goal for the club on 18 October 2025, in a 2–1 home win against Sheffield Wednesday.

On 8 September 2026, when Charlton Athletic named their 25-man squad for the 2026–27 season, Burke was not included making him ineligible to play for the club.

== Career statistics ==
As of match played 2 May 2026

Appearances and goals by club, season and competition
Club	Season	League			FA Cup		League Cup		Other		Total	
Club	Season	Division	Apps	Goals	Apps	Goals	Apps	Goals	Apps	Goals	Apps	Goals
West Ham United	2013–14	Premier League	0	0	1	0	0	0	—		1	0
West Ham United	2014–15	Premier League	5	0	0	0	1	0	—		6	0
West Ham United	2015–16	Premier League	0	0	0	0	0	0	3 (Note: Appearances in Europa League)	0	3	0
West Ham United	2016–17	Premier League	0	0	0	0	0	0	2	0	2	0
West Ham United	2017–18	Premier League	0	0	3	1	0	0	—		3	1
West Ham United	Total		5	0	4	1	1	0	5	0	15	1
Bradford City (loan)	2015–16	League One	34	2	2	0	0	0	0	0	36	2
Wigan Athletic (loan)	2016–17	Championship	10	1	0	0	0	0	—		10	1
Bolton Wanderers (loan)	2017–18	Championship	25	1	—		1	0	—		26	1
Hull City	2018–19	Championship	34	0	0	0	1	0	—		35	0
Hull City	2019–20	Championship	36	0	1	0	0	0	—		37	0
Hull City	2020–21	League One	34	4	1	1	1	0	1 (Note: Appearances in EFL Trophy)	0	37	5
Hull City	Total		104	4	3	1	2	0	1	0	110	5
Luton Town	2021–22	Championship	27	0	3	2	0	0	2 (Note: Appearances in EFL Championship play-offs)	0	32	2
Luton Town	2022–23	Championship	20	2	2	0	1	0	2	0	25	2
Luton Town	2023–24	Premier League	22	0	3	0	1	0	—		26	0
Luton Town	2024–25	Championship	17	0	0	0	1	0	—		18	0
Luton Town	Total		86	2	8	2	3	0	4	0	101	4
Charlton Athletic	2025–26	Championship	17	1	0	0	0	0	—		17	1
Charlton Athletic	2026–27	Championship	0	0	0	0	0	0	—		0	0
Charlton Athletic	Total		17	1	0	0	0	0	0	0	17	1
Career total			281	11	17	4	7	0	10	0	315	15

== Honours ==
Hull City

- EFL League One: 2020–21

Luton Town

- EFL Championship play-offs: 2023

Individual

- West Ham United Young Player of the Year: 2014–15
- Bradford City Player of the Year: 2015–16
