= Diafra Sakho =

Senegalese footballer (born 1989)

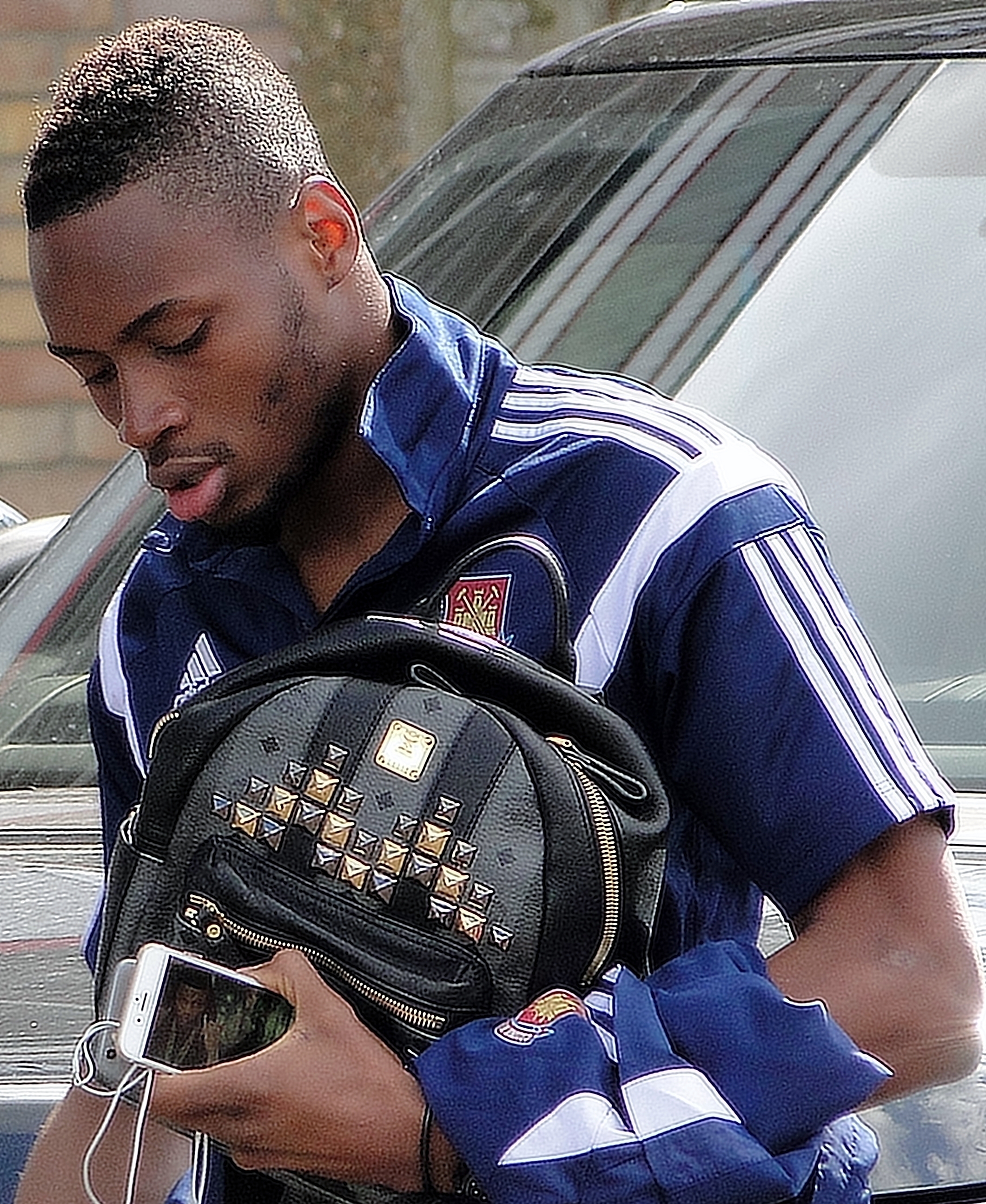
- Sakho with West Ham United in 2015

Personal information
- Full name: Diafra Sakho
- Date of birth: 24 December 1989 (age 36)
- Place of birth: Guédiawaye, Senegal
- Height: 1.84 m (6 ft 0 in)
- Position: Striker

Youth career
- 2006–2007: Génération Foot
- 2007–2009: Metz

Senior career*
Years	Team	Apps	(Gls)
2009–2014	Metz	114	(44)
2012	→ Boulogne (loan)	7	(0)
2014–2018	West Ham United	62	(18)
2018–2020	Rennes	15	(2)
2018–2019	→ Bursaspor (loan)	20	(3)
2020	Neuchâtel Xamax	8	(0)
2021–2022	Arta/Solar7		
2022–2023	Nancy	15	(4)

International career
2014–2018	Senegal	12	(2)
- * Club domestic league appearances and goals

Diafra Sakho (born 24 December 1989) is a Senegalese former professional footballer who played as a striker.

Sakho began his career in the lower divisions of French football, with Metz and on loan at Boulogne, before joining West Ham United in August 2014. Since May 2014, he has been a full international for the Senegal national team. He joined Rennes in January 2018 and was loaned to Bursaspor in August 2018.

== Club career ==
=== Metz ===
Sakho was born in Guédiawaye. He started his career in Dakar with Génération Foot, a football academy and feeder club for FC Metz, at age 16. After six months with the club he moved to France in 2007 to start training with Metz. After 17 goals in 22 games for FC Metz's reserve team in the 2009–10 season he was awarded a first-team place.

He made his first-team debut in a goalless draw at home to Brest, on 19 January 2010. His debut goal came on 10 September, in a 1–1 home draw with Nantes. He was mainly used as a substitute in his first three seasons and was loaned to Boulogne in January 2012. In May 2012, with Metz in Championnat National, the third tier of French football, new manager Albert Cartier gave Sakho a starting place in the team. The following season Sakho scored 19 goals in 33 league appearances as Metz finished in second place and won promotion back to Ligue 2 at their first attempt. In season 2013–14 he scored 20 goals in 36 appearances as Metz won the Ligue 2 title. For his performances, Sakho was voted Ligue 2 Player of the Year for the 2013–14 season.

=== West Ham United ===
On 14 August 2014, Sakho signed a four-year contract for an undisclosed fee with West Ham United, becoming their seventh signing before the start of the 2014–15 season. Upon his joining, he said: "This is a proud day to have signed for West Ham, I really love English football and I've dreamed of coming to play for one of the big English clubs. Today, West Ham have given me that opportunity and I didn't hesitate to grab it".

==== 2014–15 season ====
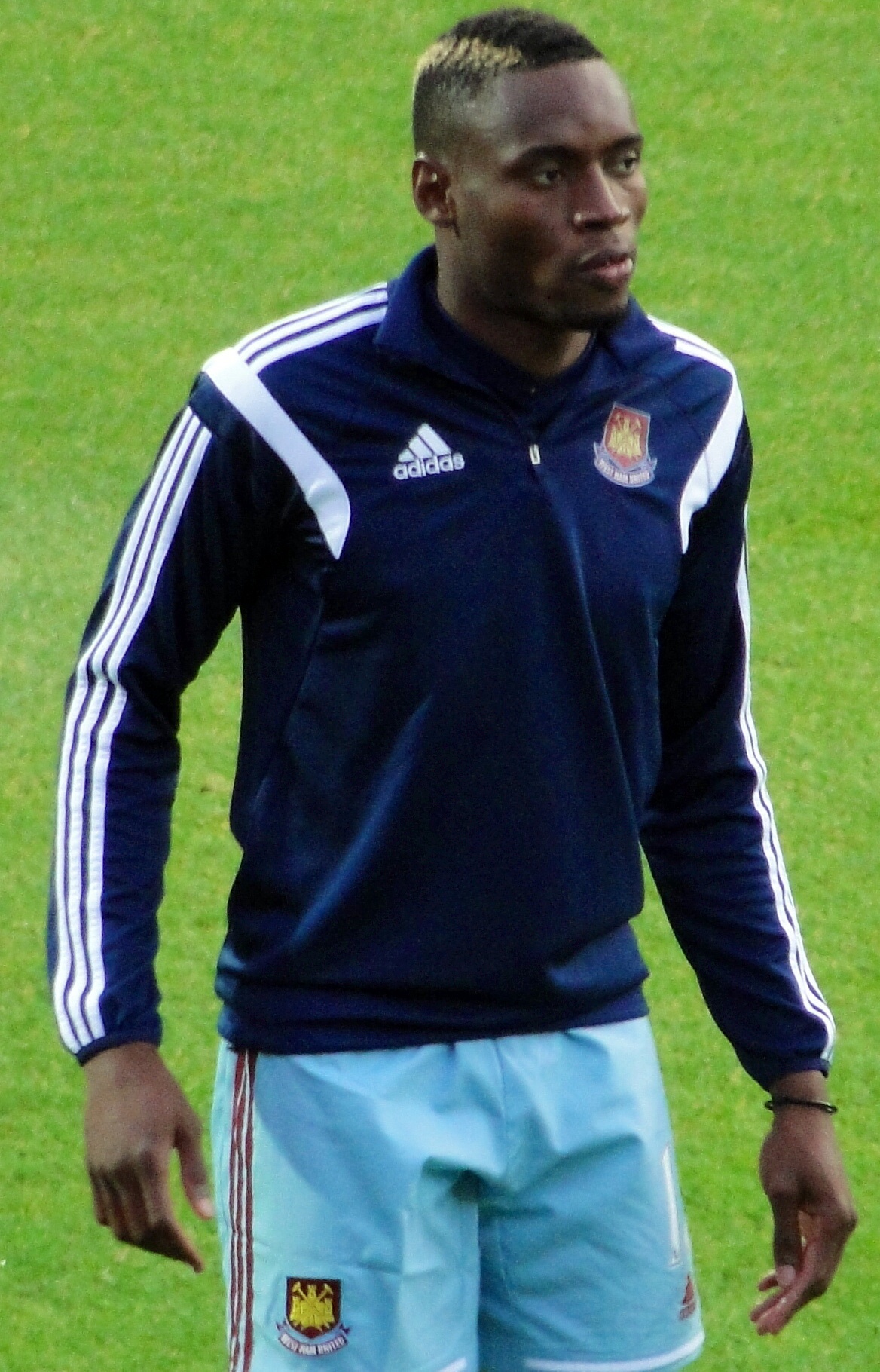
Sakho warming up with West Ham United in 2014

Sakho made his West Ham debut on 23 August 2014, in a 3–1 away win against Crystal Palace, coming on as a 63rd-minute substitute for Carlton Cole. On 26 August, he scored his first competitive goal for the club against Sheffield United in the second round of the League Cup. Sakho's first League goal came on 15 September in a 2–2 away draw against Hull City. Initially credited as an own goal by Hull defender Curtis Davies, the goal was later awarded to Sakho. He made his home debut against Liverpool on 20 September, and scored his second goal with a chip over goalkeeper Simon Mignolet as the Hammers won 3–1. On 29 September Sakho scored in a 2–1 away defeat by Manchester United. This was his fourth goal in his first four starts for the club, breaking a 26-year-old record previously held by Leroy Rosenior. On 25 October 2014 Sakho scored West Ham's second goal in a 2–1 home win against reigning champions, Manchester City. In doing so he became the first West Ham player to score in six straight Premier League games and matched Micky Quinn's Premier League record, set in 1992, of scoring in his first six starts. For his performances, Sakho was awarded the Premier League Player of the Month for October 2014, with his manager Sam Allardyce named Manager of the Month.

Sakho was injured during a game on 1 January 2015 against West Bromwich Albion. This resulted in him being withdrawn from the Senegal squad for the 2015 Africa Cup of Nations. Senegal officials announced that they would try to prevent him playing for West Ham during the duration of the competition in Africa. With Senegal still involved in the competition, he returned to fitness with officials from the country asking him to fly to Equatorial Guinea so that his fitness could be assessed. Unable to fly to Africa he was taken from London to Ashton Gate by limousine and on 25 January 2015 he scored the only goal in West Ham's FA Cup win against Bristol City. On 31 January 2015, with Senegal reported to have reported the case to FIFA, Sakho was withdrawn from West Ham's squad for an away game against Liverpool. West Ham were fined 100,000 Swiss francs by FIFA for playing Sakho in the FA Cup during the Africa Cup of Nations, avoiding a maximum penalty of being expelled from the tournament. Sakho finished as West Ham's top scorer in the 2014–15 season despite finishing the end of the season out injured. He scored 12 goals, 10 in the league and one in both the FA Cup and League.

==== 2015–16 season ====
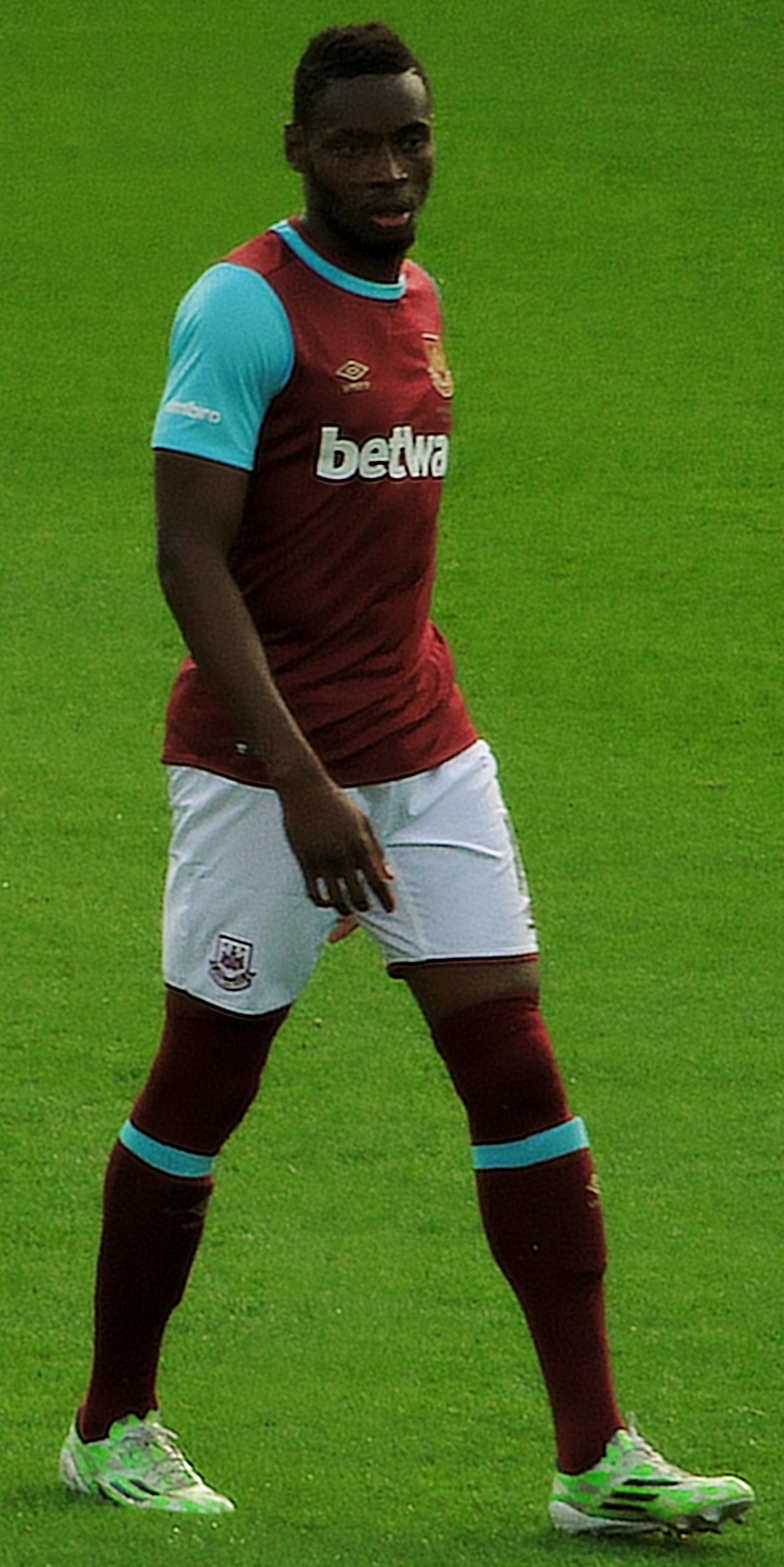
Sakho playing for West Ham United in 2015

Sakho opened the 2015–16 season by scoring the first two goals in a UEFA Europa League first qualifying round first-leg game on 2 July, as West Ham won 3–0 at home against Andorran team Lusitanos. In the return leg a week later, he was sent-off for violent conduct in the 15th minute after "raising his hands" to Lusitanos player Moisés San Nicolás. His opening goal in the 2015–16 Premier League season came on 29 August 2015 in a 0–3 away win against Liverpool. Sakho scored West Ham's third goal in a game which was their first win at Anfield for 52 years. On 19 September, he scored his second league goal of the season against Manchester City at the City of Manchester Stadium in a 2–1 win against the hosts who had not previously conceded a goal that season.

On 29 November 2015, Sakho suffered a thigh injury against West Bromwich Albion which would rule him out for three months, joining Dimitri Payet and Enner Valencia among West Ham's attacking absentees.

In June 2016, West Ham rejected a bid of £11 million from Sunderland. In July Sakho handed-in a transfer request to West Ham. In August 2016, a proposed transfer to West Bromwich Albion collapsed after Sakho failed a medical.

==== 2016–17 season ====
Sakho did not make an appearance for West Ham until November 2016 when he appeared against Tottenham Hotspur. In his second game back he scored in a 1–1 away draw with Manchester United, becoming the first West Ham striker to score in the 2016–17 season. However, he suffered a hamstring injury which was expected to keep him out for four weeks. Having only played two games all season, on 23 March 2017 West Ham announced that Sakho was expected to be out for the remainder of the 2016–17 season having suffered a back injury which required surgery and rehabilitation. He returned briefly in April for games against Arsenal and Everton before again being ruled out, in May, for the rest of the season.

==== 2017–18 season ====
Sakho made 14 league appearances for West Ham in the 2017–18 season, all of them after coming on as a substitute. He scored two goals, against Swansea City and Stoke City. He also made three appearances in the EFL Cup scoring twice, against Cheltenham Town and Bolton Wanderers. He left West Ham at the end of January 2018 having played 71 games in all competitions scoring 24 goals.

=== Stade Rennais ===
On 29 January 2018, Sakho joined Rennes for an undisclosed fee. He scored on his debut, in a 3-2 Coupe de la Ligue defeat against PSG on 30 January 2018.

==== Bursaspor loan ====
On 31 August 2018, the last day of the 2018 summer transfer window, Sakho joined Süper Lig side Bursaspor on loan for the season.

=== Neuchâtel Xamax ===
On 19 June 2020, Sakho joined Swiss Super League side Neuchâtel Xamax on a deal until the end of the season. Sakho left the club at the end of his deal after failing to score in eight appearances.

=== Nancy ===
On 7 August 2022, Sakho joined Championnat National side Nancy on a two-year deal. On 28 July 2023, Sakho announced his retirement from playing.

== International career ==
Sakho made his international debut for Senegal in a friendly match against Burkina Faso, on 21 May 2014. His debut goal came four days later, in a 3–1 win over Kosovo. In November 2014 he was recalled to the Senegal squad by coach, Alain Giresse, for the 2015 Africa Cup of Nations qualification games against Egypt and Botswana. Sakho missed the final tournament due to a back injury. In November 2017 Sakho scored the first goal in a 2–0 win against South Africa in Polokwane. The win resulted in Senegal qualifying for the 2018 World Cup in Russia, their first global finals since 2002.

In May 2018, he was named in Senegal's 23-man squad for the 2018 FIFA World Cup in Russia.

== Personal life ==
Sakho was arrested on 6 August 2015 on suspicion of common assault, criminal damage and malicious communication towards his girlfriend. He was bailed until late September. On 23 August he was again arrested, on suspicion of threatening to kill and witness intimidation, and was bailed without charge two days later. He denied all allegations against him. In November 2015, police investigation cleared Sakho of any wrongdoing.

== Career statistics ==
=== Club ===
As of 9 December 2022

Appearances and goals by club, season and competition
Club	Season	League			National cup		League cup		Continental		Total	
Club	Season	Division	Apps	Goals	Apps	Goals	Apps	Goals	Apps	Goals	Apps	Goals
Metz	2009–10	Ligue 2	5	0	1	0	0	0	—		6	0
Metz	2010–11	Ligue 2	30	5	2	0	1	0	—		33	5
Metz	2011–12	Ligue 2	9	0	1	2	0	0	—		10	2
Metz	2012–13	Championnat National	33	19	1	0	3	1	—		37	20
Metz	2013–14	Ligue 2	37	20	0	0	1	0	—		38	20
Metz	Total		114	44	5	2	5	1	—		124	47
Boulogne (loan)	2011–12	Ligue 2	7	0	0	0	0	0	—		7	0
West Ham United	2014–15	Premier League	23	10	2	1	1	1	—		26	12
West Ham United	2015–16	Premier League	21	5	1	0	0	0	2 (Note: Appearances in UEFA Europa League)	2	24	7
West Ham United	2016–17	Premier League	4	1	0	0	0	0	0	0	4	1
West Ham United	2017–18	Premier League	14	2	0	0	3	2	—		17	4
West Ham United	Total		62	18	3	1	4	3	2	2	71	24
Rennes	2017–18	Ligue 1	13	2	0	0	1	1	—		14	3
Rennes	2018–19	Ligue 1	2	0	0	0	0	0	—		2	0
Rennes	Total		15	2	0	0	1	1	0	0	16	3
Bursaspor (loan)	2018–19	Süper Lig	20	3	0	0	—		—		20	3
Neuchâtel Xamax	2019–20	Super League	8	0	—		—		—		8	0
Arta/Solar7	2021–22	Djibouti Premier League	0	0	—		—		2 (Note: Appearances in CAF Champions League)	0	2	0
Nancy	2022–23	Championnat National	13	4	1	1	—		—		14	5
Career total			239	71	9	4	10	5	4	2	262	82

=== International ===
As of 28 June 2018

Appearances and goals by national team and year
National team	Year	Apps	Goals
Senegal	2014	2	0
Senegal	2015	3	0
Senegal	2017	2	2
Senegal	2018	5	0
Total		12	2

Scores and results list Senegal's goal tally first, score column indicates score after each Sakho goal.

List of international goals scored by Diafra Sakho
No.	Date	Venue	Opponent	Score	Result	Competition
1	7 October 2017	Estádio Nacional de Cabo Verde, Praia, Cape Verde	Cape Verde	1–0	2–0	2018 FIFA World Cup qualification
2	10 November 2017	Peter Mokaba Stadium, Polokwane, South Africa	South Africa	1–0	2–0	2018 FIFA World Cup qualification

== Honours ==
Metz

- Ligue 2: 2013–14

Arta/Solar7

- Djibouti Premier League: 2021–22
- Djibouti Cup: 2021–22

Individual

- Ligue 2 Player of the Year: 2013–14
- Premier League Player of the Month: October 2014
