= 2016–17 West Ham United F.C. season =

English football team season

West Ham United
2016–17 season
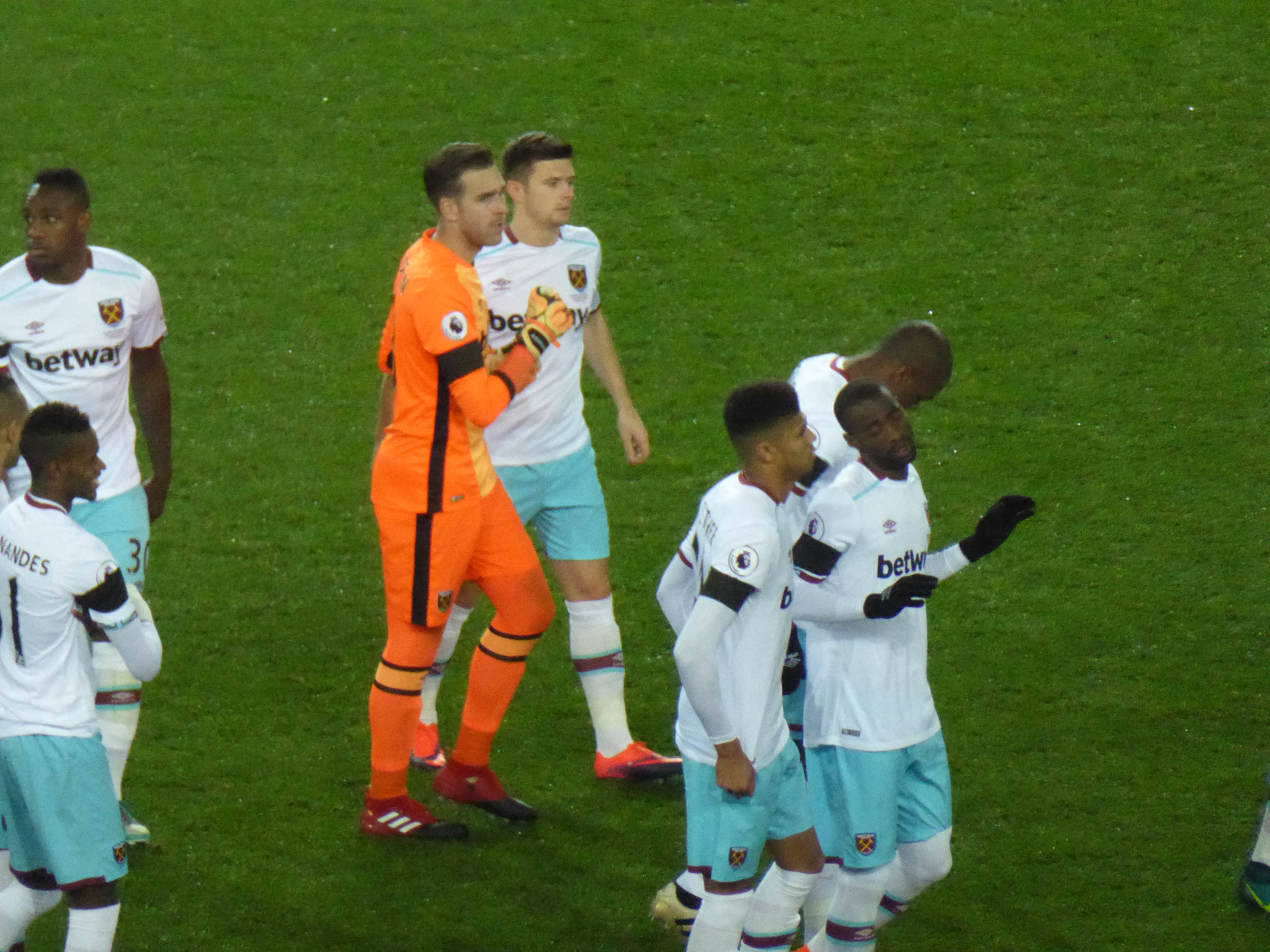
- West Ham United players in action in November 2016
- Co-chairman: David Gold; David Sullivan
- Manager: Slaven Bilić
- Stadium: London Stadium
- Premier League: 11th
- FA Cup: Third round
- EFL Cup: Fifth round
- UEFA Europa League: Play-off round
- Top goalscorer: League: Michail Antonio (9); All: Michail Antonio (9)
- Highest home attendance: 56,996 (vs Manchester United, 2 January 2017)
- Lowest home attendance: 39,877 (vs Accrington Stanley, 21 September 2016)
- Average home league attendance: 56,972
Home colours	Away colours	Third colours

The 2016–17 season was West Ham United's fifth campaign in the Premier League since being promoted in the 2011–12 season. It was West Ham's 21st Premier League campaign overall and their 59th top flight appearance in their 122nd year in existence, and their first in the London Stadium.

As well as competing in the Premier League, West Ham United took part in the FA Cup and League Cup, entering at the third round in both competitions. Despite finishing outside of the UEFA Europa League places in the 2015–16 Premier League, West Ham participated in the 2016–17 UEFA Europa League as a result of Manchester United winning the 2016 FA Cup Final.

== Club ==
=== Kits ===
Supplier: Umbro / Sponsor: betWay

Home	Home alt.	Away	Away alt. 1	Away alt. 2	Third

== Competitions ==
=== Overview ===
Competition	Record							
Competition	P	W	D	L	GF	GA	GD	Win %
Premier League	38	12	9	17	47	64	−17	31.58
FA Cup	1	0	0	1	0	5	−5	0.00
League Cup	3	2	0	1	4	5	−1	66.67
Europa League	4	1	1	2	5	4	+1	25.00
Total	46	15	10	21	56	78	−22	32.61

Updated to match played 21 May 2017
Source: Competitions

=== Pre-season friendlies ===
On 25 April 2016, West Ham United announced Juventus will be their final opponents of their 2016–17 pre-season preparations as part of the Betway Cup. The match will also be West Ham's second fixture at the Olympic Stadium after playing a Europa League 3rd round qualifying match against NK Domžale on 4 August. On 11 May, West Ham announced a two-game tour of the United States with matches coming against Seattle Sounders FC and Carolina RailHawks.

Win Draw Loss

6 July 2016	Seattle Sounders FC	3–0	West Ham United	Seattle, United States
03:30 BST	Gomez 42' (pen.); Morris 70' 72'	Report		Stadium: CenturyLink Field; Attendance: 38,585

13 July 2016	Carolina RailHawks	2–2	West Ham United	Cary, North Carolina, United States
01:00 BST	Reid 13' (o.g.); Ceballos 68' (pen.)		Reid 18'; Carroll 21'	Stadium: WakeMed Soccer Park

19 July 2016	Slovácko	2–2	West Ham United	Rohrbach, Austria
17:00	Civič 87', 90'	Report	Noble 37'; Fletcher 53'

20 July 2016	Rubin Kazan	3–0	West Ham United	Krottendorf, Austria
17:00	Dević 24'; Lestienne 45'; Karadeniz 67'	Report

23 July 2016	Karlsruher SC	0–3	West Ham United	Kapfenberg, Austria
17:00		Report	Carroll 9'; Feghouli 17'; Fletcher 80'

7 August 2016 Betway Cup	West Ham United	2–3	Juventus	London
13:00 BST	Carroll 34' 52'	Report	Dybala 18'; Mandžukić 21'; Zaza 85'	Stadium: Olympic Stadium; Attendance: 53,966; Referee: Anthony Taylor

=== Premier League ===
==== League table ====
Pos	Team	Pld	W	D	L	GF	GA	GD	Pts
9	Bournemouth	38	12	10	16	55	67	−12	46
10	West Bromwich Albion	38	12	9	17	43	51	−8	45
11	West Ham United	38	12	9	17	47	64	−17	45
12	Leicester City	38	12	8	18	48	63	−15	44
13	Stoke City	38	11	11	16	41	56	−15	44

Source: Premier League
Rules for classification: 1) Points; 2) Goal difference; 3) Goals scored; 4) Play-offs (only if needed to decide champion, teams for relegation or teams for UEFA competitions).

==== Matches ====
15 August 2016 1	Chelsea	2–1	West Ham United	Fulham, London
20:00 BST	Kanté (yellow card) 3'; Costa (yellow card) 19' (goal) 89'; Hazard 47' (pen.); Azpilicueta (yellow card) 75'; Pedro (yellow card) 90+3'	Report	Collins (yellow card) 21' (goal) 77'; Antonio (yellow card) 46'	Stadium: Stamford Bridge; Attendance: 41,521; Referee: Anthony Taylor

21 August 2016 2	West Ham United	1–0	AFC Bournemouth	Stratford, London
16:00 BST	Byram (yellow card) 38'; Reid (yellow card) 45+2'; Antonio 85'; Obiang (yellow card) 89'	Report	Arter (yellow card) 33' (yellow-red card) 77'; Cook (yellow card) 37'	Stadium: Olympic Stadium; Attendance: 56,977; Referee: Craig Pawson

28 August 2016 3	Manchester City	3–1	West Ham United	Manchester
16:00 BST	Fernandinho (yellow card) 6', (goal) 18'; Sterling 7', 90+2'	Report	Masuaku (yellow card) 14'; Fletcher (yellow card) 48'; Noble (yellow card) 51'; Antonio 58'	Stadium: City of Manchester Stadium; Attendance: 54,008; Referee: Andre Marriner

10 September 2016 4	West Ham United	2–4	Watford	Stratford, London
15:00 BST	Antonio 5', 33'; Zaza (yellow card) 12'; Byram (yellow card) 85'	Report	Ighalo 41'; Behrami (yellow card) 42'; Deeney 45+2'; Capoue 53'; Holebas 63'; Okaka (yellow card) 86'	Stadium: Olympic Stadium; Attendance: 56,974; Referee: Martin Atkinson

17 September 2016 5	West Bromwich Albion	4–2	West Ham United	West Bromwich
15:00 BST	Chadli 8' (pen.), 56'; Rondón 37'; Dawson (yellow card) 43'; McClean 44'; Nyom (yellow card) 86'	Report	Antonio 61'; Lanzini 65' (pen.); Feghouli (yellow card) 86'	Stadium: The Hawthorns; Attendance: 22,209; Referee: Mark Clattenburg

25 September 2016 6	West Ham United	0–3	Southampton	Stratford, London
16:00 BST	Noble (yellow card) 55'; Zaza (yellow card) 60'; Arbeloa (yellow card) 72'; Reid (yellow card) 81'; Payet (yellow card) 89'	Report	Romeu (yellow card) 9'; Austin 40'; Tadić 62'; Van Dijk (yellow card) 68'; Ward-Prowse 90+2'	Stadium: Olympic Stadium; Attendance: 56,864; Referee: Jonathan Moss

1 October 2016 7	West Ham United	1–1	Middlesbrough	Stratford, London
15:00 BST	Obiang (yellow card) 11'; Payet 57'; Arbeloa (yellow card) 90+3'	Report	Stuani 51' (yellow card) 80' de Roon (yellow card) 62'; Barragán (yellow card) 88'	Stadium: Olympic Stadium; Attendance: 56,945; Referee: Neil Swarbrick

15 October 2016 8	Crystal Palace	0–1	West Ham United	Selhurst, London
17:30 BST	Benteke (penalty missed) 45+1' (yellow card) 48'	Report	Lanzini 19'; Noble (yellow card) 21'; Ogbonna (yellow card) 62'; Cresswell (yellow card) 74' (yellow-red card) 75'; Kouyaté (yellow card) 90+4'	Stadium: Selhurst Park; Attendance: 25,643; Referee: Martin Atkinson

22 October 2016 9	West Ham United	1–0	Sunderland	Stratford, London
15:00 BST	Fernandes (yellow card) 31'; Reid (yellow card) 68', (goal) 90+4'	Report	Rodwell (yellow card) 25'; N'Dong (yellow card) 27'; Pienaar (yellow card) 40'; Khazri (yellow card) 83'; Jones (yellow card) 90'	Stadium: Olympic Stadium; Attendance: 56,985; Referee: Robert Madley

30 October 2016 10	Everton	2–0	West Ham United	Liverpool
13:30 GMT	Gueye (yellow card) 31'; Lukaku 50'; Oviedo (yellow card) 74'; Barkley 76'	Report	Obiang (yellow card) 54'; Reid (yellow card) 67'; Antonio (yellow card) 89'	Stadium: Goodison Park; Attendance: 39,574; Referee: Anthony Taylor

5 November 2016 11	West Ham United	1–1	Stoke City	Stratford, London
15:00 GMT	Antonio (yellow card) 12'; Whelan 65' (o.g.); Fernandes (yellow card) 72'; Adrián (yellow card) 76'; Noble (yellow card) 88'	Report	Bojan 75'; Allen (yellow card) 90+3'	Stadium: Olympic Stadium; Attendance: 56,970; Referee: Andre Marriner

19 November 2016 12	Tottenham Hotspur	3–2	West Ham United	Tottenham, London
17:30 GMT	Dembélé (yellow card) 35'; Winks 51'; Walker (yellow card) 53'; Rose (yellow card) 62'; Kane 89', 90+1' (pen.)	Report	Antonio 24', (yellow card) 64'; Lanzini (yellow card) 31', (goal) 68' (pen.); Reid (yellow card) 90+3' (yellow-red card) 90+6'	Stadium: White Hart Lane; Referee: Mike Dean

27 November 2016 13	Manchester United	1–1	West Ham United	Manchester
16:30 GMT	Ibrahimović 21'; Pogba (yellow card) 27'; Fellaini (yellow card) 88'; Valencia (yellow card) 90+1'	Report	Sakho 2'; Cresswell (yellow card) 90'	Stadium: Old Trafford; Attendance: 75,313; Referee: Jonathan Moss

3 December 2016 14	West Ham United	1–5	Arsenal	Stratford, London
17:30 GMT	Carroll 83'	Report	Özil 24'; Sánchez 72', 80', 86'; Chamberlain 84'	Stadium: Olympic Stadium; Attendance: 56,980; Referee: Craig Pawson

11 December 2016 15	Liverpool	2–2	West Ham United	Liverpool
16:30 GMT	Lallana 5'; Origi 48'; Firmino (yellow card) 53'; Mané (yellow card) 76'	Report	Payet 26'; Antonio 39'	Stadium: Anfield; Attendance: 53,068; Referee: Mark Clattenburg

14 December 2016 16	West Ham United	1–0	Burnley	Stratford, London
19:45 GMT	Noble (penalty missed) 45+2' 45+2'	Report	Mee (yellow card) 62'; Hendrick (yellow card) 72'	Stadium: London Stadium; Attendance: 56,990; Referee: Robert Madley

17 December 2016 17	West Ham United	1–0	Hull City	Stratford, London
15:00 GMT	Obiang (yellow card) 36'; Noble (yellow card) 61', (goal) 76' (pen.)	Report	Livermore (yellow card) 32'; Dawson (yellow card) 74'; Henriksen (yellow card) 84'; Maguire (yellow card) 90+6'	Stadium: London Stadium; Attendance: 56,952; Referee: Lee Mason

26 December 2016 18	Swansea City	1–4	West Ham United	Swansea
15:00 GMT	Llorente 89'	Report	Ayew 13'; Reid 50'; Antonio 78'; Carroll 90'	Stadium: Liberty Stadium; Attendance: 20,757; Referee: Andre Marriner

31 December 2016 19	Leicester City	1–0	West Ham United	Leicester
15:00 GMT	Slimani 20'; Huth (yellow card) 44'; Amartey (yellow card) 47'; Albrighton (yellow card) 66'; Schmeichel (yellow card) 72'; Simpson (yellow card) 83'	Report	Ogbonna (yellow card) 45'; Nordtveit (yellow card) 71'; Lanzini (yellow card) 84'	Stadium: King Power Stadium; Attendance: 32,060; Referee: Anthony Taylor

2 January 2017 20	West Ham United	0–2	Manchester United	Stratford, London
17:15 GMT	Feghouli (red card) 15'; Payet (yellow card) 29'; Nordtveit (yellow card) 90+1'	Report	Darmian (yellow card) 42'; Mata 63'; Valencia (yellow card) 75'; Ibrahimović 78'	Stadium: London Stadium; Attendance: 56,996; Referee: Mike Dean

14 January 2017 21	West Ham United	3–0	Crystal Palace	Stratford, London
15:00 GMT	Noble (yellow card) 34'; Carroll (yellow card) 42', (goal) 79'; Feghouli 68'; Byram (yellow card) 70'; Lanzini 86', (yellow card) 87'	Report	Ledley (yellow card) 38'; Ward (yellow card) 90+1'	Stadium: London Stadium; Attendance: 56,984; Referee: Neil Swarbrick

21 January 2017 22	Middlesbrough	1–3	West Ham United	Middlesbrough
15:00 GMT	Stuani 27'; Gibson (yellow card) 80'; Bernardo (yellow card) 83'	Report	Lanzini (yellow card) 6'; Carroll 9', 43'; Calleri 90+4'	Stadium: Riverside Stadium; Attendance: 30,848; Referee: Martin Atkinson

1 February 2017 23	West Ham United	0–4	Manchester City	Stratford, London
19:45 GMT	Obiang (yellow card) 19'; Lanzini (yellow card) 24'; Carroll (yellow card) 71'	Report	De Bruyne 17' (yellow card) 44'; Jesus (yellow card) 19', (goal) 39'; Silva 21'; Sterling (yellow card) 60'; Touré 67' (pen.)	Stadium: Olympic Stadium; Attendance: 56,980; Referee: Kevin Friend

4 February 2017 24	Southampton	1–3	West Ham United	Southampton
15:00 GMT	Gabbiadini 12'	Report	Carroll 14'; Obiang 45'; Noble 52'; Cresswell (yellow card) 80'; Reid (yellow card) 82'	Stadium: St Mary's Stadium; Attendance: 31,891; Referee: Graham Scott

11 February 2017 25	West Ham United	2–2	West Bromwich Albion	Stratford, London
15:00 GMT	Obiang (yellow card) 60'; Feghouli 63'; Reid (yellow card) 85'; Lanzini 86'; Noble (yellow card) 90+6'	Report	Chadli 6'; Rondón (yellow card) 73'; Brunt (yellow card) 88'; McAuley 90+4'	Stadium: Olympic Stadium; Attendance: 56,983; Referee: Michael Oliver

25 February 2017 26	Watford	1–1	West Ham United	Watford
17:30 GMT	Deeney 3' (pen.); Janmaat (yellow card) 36'; Cleverley (yellow card) 68'; Doucouré (yellow card) 79'; Holebas (yellow card) 83'	Report	Antonio (yellow card) 45+10' (yellow-red card) 86'; Kouyaté (yellow card) 65'; Ayew 73'	Stadium: Vicarage Road; Attendance: 20,702; Referee: Craig Pawson

6 March 2017 27	West Ham United	1–2	Chelsea	Stratford, London
20:00 GMT	Lanzini 90+2'	Report	Hazard 25'; Fàbregas (yellow card) 45+2'; Costa 50'	Stadium: Olympic Stadium; Attendance: 56,984; Referee: Andre Marriner

11 March 2017 28	AFC Bournemouth	3–2	West Ham United	Bournemouth
15:00 GMT	King 31', 48', 90'; Pugh (yellow card) 66'; Afobe (yellow card) 72'; Gosling (yellow card) 80'; Cook (yellow card) 90+3'	Report	Noble (yellow card) 9'; Antonio 10'; Obiang (yellow card) 34'; Ayew 83'	Stadium: Dean Court; Attendance: 11,369; Referee: Robert Madley

18 March 2017 29	West Ham United	2–3	Leicester City	Stratford, London
15:00 GMT	Lanzini 20'; Ayew 63'	Report	Mahrez 5'; Huth 7'; Vardy 38'; Drinkwater (yellow card) 56'	Stadium: London Stadium; Attendance: 56,979; Referee: Roger East

1 April 2017 30	Hull City	2–1	West Ham United	Kingston upon Hull
15:00 BST	Robertson 53'; Niasse (yellow card) 58'; N'Diaye (yellow card) 73'; Ranocchia 85'	Report	Fonte (yellow card) 2'; Carroll 18' (yellow card) 64'	Stadium: KCOM Stadium; Attendance: 20,820; Referee: Mike Jones

5 April 2017 31	Arsenal	3–0	West Ham United	Holloway, London
19:45 BST	Bellerín (yellow card) 18'; Özil 58'; Mustafi (yellow card) 62'; Walcott 68'; Giroud 83'	Report	Lanzini (yellow card) 39'; Byram (yellow card) 77'	Stadium: Emirates Stadium; Attendance: 59,961; Referee: Martin Atkinson

8 April 2017 32	West Ham United	1–0	Swansea City	Stratford, London
15:00 BST	Noble (yellow card) 38'; Kouyaté 44' (yellow card) 45'; Lanzini (yellow card) 57'; Ayew (yellow card) 81'; Randolph (yellow card) 90+4'	Report	Fernández (yellow card) 77'	Stadium: London Stadium; Attendance: 56,973; Referee: Kevin Friend

15 April 2017 33	Sunderland	2–2	West Ham United	Sunderland
15:00 BST	Cattermole (yellow card) 1'; Khazri 26'; Borini 90'	Report	Ayew 5'; Collins 47'; Byram (yellow card) 70' (yellow-red card) 90+5'	Stadium: Stadium of Light; Attendance: 40,168; Referee: Andre Marriner

22 April 2017 34	West Ham United	0–0	Everton	Stratford, London
15:00 BST	Fernandes (yellow card) 33'; Fonte (yellow card) 76'	Report	Gueye (yellow card) 27'; Williams (yellow card) 61'; Barry (yellow card) 68'	Stadium: London Stadium; Attendance: 56,971; Referee: Roger East

29 April 2017 35	Stoke City	0–0	West Ham United	Stoke-on-Trent
15:00 BST	Muniesa (yellow card) 17'	Report		Stadium: bet365 Stadium; Attendance: 27,628; Referee: Lee Probert

5 May 2017 36	West Ham United	1–0	Tottenham Hotspur	Stratford, London
20:00 BST	Noble (yellow card) 15'; Reid (yellow card) 38'; Lanzini 65' (yellow card) 66'; Byram (yellow card) 71'	Report	Walker (yellow card) 12'; Trippier (yellow card) 90+4'	Stadium: London Stadium; Attendance: 56,992; Referee: Anthony Taylor

14 May 2017 37	West Ham United	0–4	Liverpool	Stratford, London
14:15 BST	Fernandes (yellow card) 50'; Collins (yellow card) 62'	Report	Sturridge 35'; Coutinho 57', 61'; Origi 76'	Stadium: London Stadium; Attendance: 56,985; Referee: Neil Swarbrick

21 May 2017 38	Burnley	1–2	West Ham United	Burnley
15:00 BST	Vokes 24'; Westwood (yellow card) 26'; Guðmundsson (yellow card) 86'	Report	Collins (yellow card) 17'; Feghouli 27'; Lanzini (yellow card) 42'; Ayew 72'	Stadium: Turf Moor; Attendance: 21,634; Referee: Bobby Madley

==== Results summary ====
Overall								Home						Away					
Pld	W	D	L	GF	GA	GD	Pts	W	D	L	GF	GA	GD	W	D	L	GF	GA	GD
38	12	9	17	47	64	−17	45	7	4	8	19	31	−12	5	5	9	28	33	−5

Last updated: 21 May 2017.
Source: Premier League

==== Results by matchday ====
Matchday	1	2	3	4	5	6	7	8	9	10	11	12	13	14	15	16	17	18	19	20	21	22	23	24	25	26	27	28	29	30	31	32	33	34	35	36	37	38
Ground	A	H	A	H	A	H	H	A	H	A	H	A	A	H	A	H	H	A	A	H	H	A	H	A	H	A	H	A	H	A	A	H	A	H	A	H	H	A
Result	L	W	L	L	L	L	D	W	W	L	D	L	D	L	D	W	W	W	L	L	W	W	L	W	D	D	L	L	L	L	L	W	D	D	D	W	L	W
Position	15	9	12	17	17	18	18	15	15	16	16	17	16	17	17	15	13	11	13	13	12	10	11	9	10	9	11	11	12	14	15	14	13	14	15	9	12	11

Updated to match(es) played on 21 May 2017. Source: Statto
A = Away; H = Home; W = Win; D = Draw; L = Loss

=== FA Cup ===
As a Premier League club, West Ham United entered the competition in the third round, drawing Manchester City at home.

6 January 2017 Third round	West Ham United	0–5	Manchester City	Stratford, London
19:55 GMT		Report	Touré 33' (pen.); Nordtveit 41' (o.g.); Silva 43'; Agüero 50'; Stones 84'	Stadium: London Stadium; Attendance: 56,975; Referee: Michael Oliver

=== EFL Cup ===
21 September 2016 Third round	West Ham United	1–0	Accrington Stanley	Stratford, London
19:45 BST	Payet 90+6'	Report	Boco (yellow card) 90+5'	Stadium: Olympic Stadium; Attendance: 39,788; Referee: Stephen Martin

26 October 2016 Fourth round	West Ham United	2–1	Chelsea	Stratford, London
19:45 BST	Kouyaté 11'; Fernandes 48'; Noble (yellow card) 63'; Reid (yellow card) 76'	Report	Cahill 90+4'	Stadium: Olympic Stadium; Attendance: 45,957; Referee: Craig Pawson

30 November 2016 Fifth round	Manchester United	4–1	West Ham United	Manchester
20:00 GMT	Ibrahimović 2', 90+3'; Valencia (yellow card) 39'; Martial 48', 62'; Rooney (yellow card) 53'	Report	Obiang (yellow card) 15'; Fletcher 35'	Stadium: Old Trafford; Attendance: 65,269; Referee: Mike Jones

=== UEFA Europa League ===
West Ham qualified for the 2016–17 Europa League after finishing seventh in the 2015–16 Premier League. With fifth-placed Manchester United qualifying for the competition having won the 2016 FA Cup Final, their place in the Europa League went to next highest placed team not already qualified, West Ham.

==== Third qualifying round ====
28 July 2016 First leg	NK Domžale (Slovenia)	2–1	(England) West Ham United	Ljubljana, Slovenia
19:45 CEST	Črnic 11' (pen.), 49'; Alvir (yellow card) 13'; Horvat (yellow card) 56'	Report	Nordtveit (yellow card) 11'; Noble 18' (pen.)	Stadium: Stožice Stadium; Attendance: 8,458; Referee: Mete Kalkavan (Turkey)

4 August 2016 Second leg	West Ham United (England)	3–0 (4–2 agg.)	(Slovenia) NK Domžale	London, England
19:45 BST	Kouyaté 8', 25'; Antonio (yellow card) 42'; Feghouli 81' (yellow card) 82'	Report	Črnic (yellow card) 4'; Balkovec (yellow card) 39'; Horić (yellow card) 47'	Stadium: Olympic Stadium; Attendance: 53,914; Referee: Fredy Fautrel (France)

==== Play-off round ====
18 August 2016 First leg	Astra Giurgiu (Romania)	1–1	(England) West Ham United	Giurgiu, Romania
20:15 CEST	Săpunaru (yellow card) 44'; Vangjeli (yellow card) 56'; Alves (yellow card) 69'; Alibec 83' (yellow card) 83'	Report	Byram (yellow card) 41'; Noble 45' (pen.); Oxford (yellow card) 78'; Antonio (yellow card) 90'	Stadium: Stadionul Marin Anastasovici; Attendance: 3,360; Referee: Artur Soares (Portugal)

25 August 2016 Second leg	West Ham United (England)	0–1 (1–2 agg.)	(Romania) Astra Giurgiu	London, England
19:45 BST	Reid (yellow card) 28'; Collins (yellow card) 90'; Antonio (yellow card) 90+1'; Byram (yellow card) 90+2'	Report	Teixeira 45'; Júnior Maranhão (yellow card) 54'; Lung (yellow card) 69'	Stadium: Olympic Stadium; Attendance: 56,932; Referee: Manuel Gräfe (Germany)

== Squad ==
=== First team squad ===
Squad No.	Name	Nationality	Position (s)	Date of birth (age)	Signed from
Goalkeepers
1	Darren Randolph	(Republic of Ireland)	GK	12 May 1987 (aged 30)	(England) Birmingham City
13	Adrián	(Spain)	GK	3 January 1987 (aged 30)	(Spain) Real Betis
34	Raphael Spiegel	(Switzerland)	GK	19 December 1992 (aged 24)	(Switzerland) Grasshopper
Defenders
2	Winston Reid	(New Zealand)	CB	3 July 1988 (aged 28)	(Denmark) Midtjylland
3	Aaron Cresswell	(England)	LB	15 December 1989 (aged 27)	(England) Ipswich Town
5	Álvaro Arbeloa	(Spain)	RB	17 January 1983 (aged 34)	(Spain) Real Madrid
19	James Collins	(Wales)	CB	23 August 1983 (aged 33)	(England) Aston Villa
21	Angelo Ogbonna	(Italy)	CB	23 May 1988 (aged 28)	(Italy) Juventus
22	Sam Byram	(England)	RB	16 September 1993 (aged 23)	(England) Leeds United
23	José Fonte	(Portugal)	CB	22 December 1983 (aged 33)	(England) Southampton
25	Doneil Henry	(Canada)	CB	20 April 1993 (aged 24)	(Cyprus) Apollon Limassol
26	Arthur Masuaku	(France)	LB	7 November 1993 (aged 23)	(Greece) Olympiacos
35	Reece Oxford	(England)	CB/DM	16 December 1998 (aged 18)	Academy
41	Declan Rice	(Republic of Ireland)	CB	14 January 1999 (aged 18)	Academy
66	Alex Pike	(England)	RB	8 February 1997 (aged 20)	Academy
Midfielders
4	Håvard Nordtveit	(Norway)	DM/CB	21 June 1990 (aged 26)	(Germany) Borussia Mönchengladbach
7	Sofiane Feghouli	(Algeria)	RM	26 December 1989 (aged 27)	(Spain) Valencia
8	Cheikhou Kouyaté	(Senegal)	DM/CB	21 December 1989 (aged 27)	(Belgium) Anderlecht
10	Manuel Lanzini	(Argentina)	AM	15 February 1993 (aged 24)	(United Arab Emirates) Al Jazira
11	Robert Snodgrass	(Scotland)	CM/RM	7 September 1987 (aged 29)	(England) Hull City
14	Pedro Obiang	(Spain)	CM/DM	27 March 1992 (aged 25)	(Italy) Sampdoria
16	Mark Noble	(England)	CM	8 May 1987 (aged 30)	Academy
17	Gökhan Töre	(Turkey)	RM	20 January 1992 (aged 25)	(Turkey) Beşiktaş (loan)
30	Michail Antonio	(England)	RM/RB	28 March 1990 (aged 27)	(England) Nottingham Forest
36	Domingos Quina	(Portugal)	AM	18 November 1999 (aged 17)	(England) Chelsea
40	Djair Parfitt-Williams	(Bermuda)	LM	1 October 1996 (aged 20)	Academy
46	Moses Makasi	(England)	CM	22 September 1995 (aged 21)	Academy
52	Marcus Browne	(England)	AM	18 December 1997 (aged 19)	Academy
Forwards
9	Andy Carroll	(England)	ST	6 January 1989 (aged 28)	(England) Liverpool
15	Diafra Sakho	(Senegal)	ST	24 December 1989 (aged 27)	(France) Metz
20	André Ayew	(Ghana)	ST	17 December 1989 (aged 27)	(Wales) Swansea City
24	Ashley Fletcher	(England)	ST	2 October 1995 (aged 21)	(England) Manchester United
28	Jonathan Calleri	(Argentina)	ST	23 September 1993 (aged 23)	(Uruguay) Deportivo Maldonado (loan)
29	Antonio Martínez	(Spain)	ST	30 June 1997 (aged 19)	(Spain) Valencia

== Statistics ==
=== Appearances and goals ===
As of 8 April 2018

No.	Pos	Nat	Player	Total		Premier League		FA Cup		League Cup		Europa League	
No.	Pos	Nat	Player	Apps	Goals	Apps	Goals	Apps	Goals	Apps	Goals	Apps	Goals
Goalkeepers
1	GK	(Republic of Ireland) IRL	Darren Randolph	27	0	22	0	0	0	2	0	3	0
13	GK	(Spain) ESP	Adrián	21	0	18	0	1	0	1	0	1	0
Defenders
2	DF	(New Zealand) NZL	Winston Reid	37	2	31	2	1	0	2	0	3	0
3	DF	(England) ENG	Aaron Cresswell	31	0	26+2	0	1	0	2	0	0	0
5	DF	(Spain) ESP	Álvaro Arbeloa	4	0	1+2	0	0	0	1	0	0	0
19	DF	(Wales) WAL	James Collins	26	2	21+3	2	0	0	0	0	0+2	0
21	DF	(Italy) ITA	Angelo Ogbonna	27	0	21	0	1	0	3	0	2	0
22	DF	(England) ENG	Sam Byram	24	0	15+5	0	0	0	0	0	4	0
23	DF	(Portugal) POR	José Fonte	18	0	18	0	0	0	0	0	0	0
26	DF	(France) FRA	Arthur Masuaku	15	0	11+2	0	0	0	1+1	0	0	0
Midfielders
4	MF	(Norway) NOR	Håvard Nordtveit	22	0	12+5	0	1	0	1	0	3	0
7	MF	(Algeria) ALG	Sofiane Feghouli	29	5	12+11	4	1	0	2+1	0	2	1
8	MF	(Senegal) SEN	Cheikhou Kouyaté	36	4	31	1	0	0	2	1	3	2
10	MF	(Argentina) ARG	Manuel Lanzini	41	8	33+4	8	1	0	1+2	0	0	0
11	MF	(Scotland) SCO	Robert Snodgrass	17	0	9+8	0	0	0	0	0	0	0
14	MF	(Spain) ESP	Pedro Obiang	30	1	21+1	1	1	0	3	0	3+1	0
16	MF	(England) ENG	Mark Noble	35	5	29+1	3	0+1	0	1	0	3	2
17	MF	(Turkey) TUR	Gökhan Töre	8	0	3+2	0	0	0	1	0	2	0
30	MF	(England) ENG	Michail Antonio	37	9	29	9	1	0	2+1	0	4	0
31	MF	(Switzerland) SUI	Edimilson Fernandes	34	1	10+20	0	1	0	3	1	0	0
36	MF	(Portugal) POR	Domingos Quina	2	0	0	0	0	0	0	0	0+2	0
41	MF	(Republic of Ireland) IRL	Declan Rice	2	0	0+2	0	0	0	0	0	0	0
Forwards
9	FW	(England) ENG	Andy Carroll	22	7	15+3	7	1	0	0	0	2+1	0
15	FW	(Senegal) SEN	Diafra Sakho	4	1	2+2	1	0	0	0	0	0	0
20	FW	(Ghana) GHA	André Ayew	28	7	18+9	7	0	0	0+1	0	0	0
24	FW	(England) ENG	Ashley Fletcher	22	1	2+16	0	0+1	0	1	1	0+2	0
28	FW	(Argentina) ARG	Jonathan Calleri	20	1	5+12	1	0	0	1	0	2	0
Players transferred out during the season
11	FW	(Ecuador) ECU	Enner Valencia	7	0	3	0	0	0	0	0	3+1	0
11	FW	(Italy) ITA	Simone Zaza	11	0	5+3	0	0	0	1+2	0	0	0
27	MF	(France) FRA	Dimitri Payet	22	3	17+1	2	0+1	0	2+1	1	0	0
32	DF	(England) ENG	Reece Burke	2	0	0	0	0	0	0	0	2	0
35	DF	(England) ENG	Reece Oxford	2	0	0	0	0	0	0	0	2	0
43	MF	(England) ENG	Marcus Browne	1	0	0	0	0	0	0	0	0+1	0

=== Goalscorers ===
As of 21 May 2017

Rank	Pos	No.	Nat	Name	Premier League	FA Cup	League Cup	Europa League	Total
1	MF	30	(England)	Michail Antonio	9	0	0	0	9
2	MF	10	(Argentina)	Manuel Lanzini	8	0	0	0	8
3	ST	9	(England)	Andy Carroll	7	0	0	0	7
4	ST	20	(Ghana)	André Ayew	6	0	0	0	6
5	MF	16	(England)	Mark Noble	3	0	0	2	5
6	MF	7	(Algeria)	Sofiane Feghouli	3	0	0	1	4
6	MF	8	(Senegal)	Cheikhou Kouyaté	1	0	1	2	4
8	MF	27	(France)	Dimitri Payet	2	0	1	0	3
9	DF	2	(New Zealand)	Winston Reid	2	0	0	0	2
9	DF	19	(Wales)	James Collins	2	0	0	0	2
11	MF	14	(Spain)	Pedro Obiang	1	0	0	0	1
11	ST	15	(Senegal)	Diafra Sakho	1	0	0	0	1
11	ST	24	(England)	Ashley Fletcher	0	0	1	0	1
11	ST	28	(Argentina)	Jonathan Calleri	1	0	0	0	1
11	MF	31	(Switzerland)	Edimilson Fernandes	0	0	1	0	1
11	Own goals				1	0	0	0	1
Totals					47	0	4	5	56

== Transfers ==
=== Transfers in ===
Date from	Position	Nationality	Name	From	Fee	Ref.
1 July 2016	RW	ALG	Sofiane Feghouli	Valencia	Free transfer	
1 July 2016	AM	ARG	Manuel Lanzini	Al-Jazira	Undisclosed	
1 July 2016	ST	ESP	Toni Martínez	Valencia	Undisclosed	
1 July 2016	DM	NOR	Håvard Nordtveit	Borussia Mönchengladbach	Free transfer	
1 July 2016	ST	POR	Domingos Quina	Free agent	Free transfer	
12 July 2016	CF	ENG	Ashley Fletcher	Manchester United	Free transfer	
8 August 2016	LW	GHA	André Ayew	Swansea City	£20,500,000	
8 August 2016	LB	FRA	Arthur Masuaku	Olympiacos	£6,200,000	
25 August 2016	AM	SUI	Edimilson Fernandes	Sion	£5,500,000	
31 August 2016	RB	ESP	Álvaro Arbeloa	Real Madrid	Free transfer	
20 January 2017	CB	POR	José Fonte	Southampton	£8,000,000	
22 January 2017	LW	ENG	Nathan Holland	Everton	Undisclosed	
27 January 2017	RW	SCO	Robert Snodgrass	Hull City	£10,200,000	

=== Transfers out ===
Date from	Position	Nationality	Name	To	Fee	Ref.
1 July 2016	CF	ENG	Elliot Lee	Barnsley	Undisclosed	
1 July 2016	DF	IRL	Joey O'Brien	Released		
5 July 2016	CB	ENG	James Tomkins	Crystal Palace	£10,000,000	
6 January 2017	LB	ENG	Lewis Page	Charlton Athletic	Undisclosed	
30 January 2017	LW	FRA	Dimitri Payet	Marseille	£25,000,000	

=== Loans in ===
Date from	Position	Nationality	Name	From	Date until	Ref.
11 July 2016	RW	TUR	Gökhan Töre	Beşiktaş	End of Season (Note: Gökhan Töre has cost West Ham United £2,500,000 for the season-long loan.)	
11 August 2016	CF	ARG	Jonathan Calleri	Deportivo Maldonado	End of Season (Note: Jonathan Calleri has cost West Ham United £4,000,000 for the season-long loan.)	
28 August 2016	CF	ITA	Simone Zaza	Juventus	15 January 2017 (Note: Simone Zaza has cost West Ham United £5,000,000 for the season-long loan.) (Note: On 15 January 2017, Simone Zaza's loan was terminated.)	

=== Loans out ===
Date from	Position	Nationality	Name	To	Date until	Ref.
1 July 2016	CB	ENG	George Dobson	Walsall	End of Season	
1 July 2016	LB	SCO	Stephen Hendrie	Blackburn Rovers	End of Season	
1 July 2016	RB	ENG	Kyle Knoyle	Wigan Athletic	End of Season	
8 August 2016	CM	IRL	Josh Cullen	Bradford City	End of Season (Note: On 3 January 2017, Josh Cullen's loan at Bradford City was extended until the end of the season.)	
8 August 2016	CB	ENG	Josh Pask	Gillingham	End of Season	
9 August 2016	LB	ENG	Lewis Page	Coventry City	12 January 2017	
25 August 2016	AM	NOR	Martin Samuelsen	Blackburn Rovers	22 November 2016 (Note: On 22 November 2016, Martin Samuelsen's loan was terminated at Blackburn Rovers.)	
30 August 2016	CB	ENG	Reece Burke	Wigan Athletic	End of Season	
31 August 2016	CF	ECU	Enner Valencia	Everton	End of Season	
1 January 2017	CF	ENG	Jaanai Gordon	Newport County	End of Season	
1 January 2017	AM	NOR	Martin Samuelsen	Peterborough United	End of Season	
12 January 2017	RB	ENG	Alex Pike	Cheltenham Town	End of Season	
20 January 2017	AM	ENG	Marcus Browne	Wigan Athletic	End of Season	
23 January 2017	CF	ESP	Toni Martínez	Oxford United	End of Season	
31 January 2017	CB	ENG	Reece Oxford	Reading	End of Season	
