= Joey O'Brien =

Irish footballer and manager (born 1986)

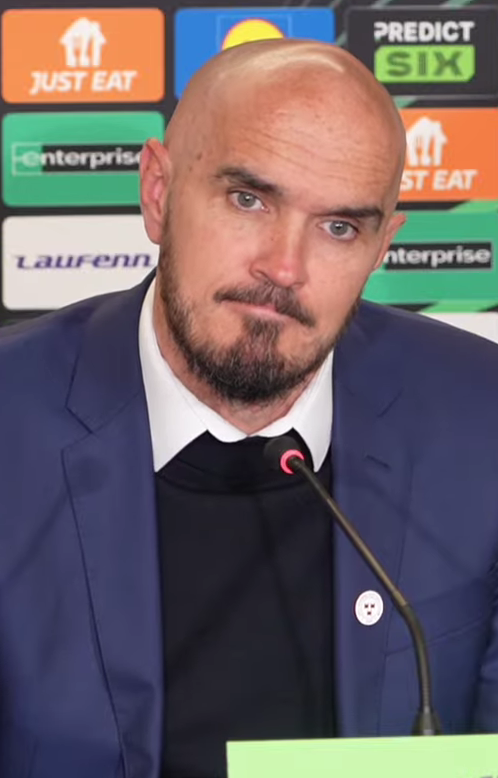
- O'Brien as Shelbourne manager in 2025

Personal information
- Full name: Joseph Martin O'Brien
- Date of birth: 17 February 1986 (age 40)
- Place of birth: Dublin, Ireland
- Height: 1.80 m (5 ft 11 in)
- Positions: Full-back; defensive midfielder

Youth career
- Lourdes Celtic
- 2002–2004: Bolton Wanderers

Senior career*
Years	Team	Apps	(Gls)
2004–2011	Bolton Wanderers	50	(0)
2004–2005	→ Sheffield Wednesday (loan)	15	(2)
2011	→ Sheffield Wednesday (loan)	4	(0)
2011–2016	West Ham United	91	(3)
2018–2021	Shamrock Rovers	63	(4)
Total		223	(9)

International career
- Republic of Ireland U19
2005–2006	Republic of Ireland U21	6	(0)
2006–2012	Republic of Ireland	5	(0)

Managerial career
- 2025: Shelbourne (interim)
- 2025–2026: Shelbourne
- * Club domestic league appearances and goals

Joseph Martin O'Brien (born 17 February 1986) is an Irish professional football coach and former player who played as a full-back and defensive midfielder.

O'Brien played for Bolton Wanderers, Sheffield Wednesday, West Ham United and Shamrock Rovers, and was capped five times by the Republic of Ireland at senior level between 2006 and 2012.

In 2021 he became the assistant manager of Shelbourne and remained in the role until June 2025, when he became interim head coach of the club following the resignation of Damien Duff. O'Brien got the job on a permanent basis in July 2025 before being sacked in June 2026.

== Early life ==
Born in Dublin, O'Brien began playing football for local team Lourdes Celtic .

== Playing career ==
=== Bolton Wanderers ===
O'Brien started his career with Bolton Wanderers in 2004 after starting out his first year scholarships in 2002.

To gain further experience, O'Brien was loaned out to League One team Sheffield Wednesday for the most part of the 2004–05 season, making 15 appearances and scoring two goals, including one on his debut. After extending his loan spell at the club twice times, O'Brien was named as captain for the last game of his loan spell in honour of his contribution.

Upon returning to Bolton Wanderers from a loan spell at Sheffield Wednesday, O'Brien made his Premier League debut on 15 May 2005 against Everton when coming on as a late substitute in place of Fernando Hierro. He was given his first start in Bolton's colours in their away UEFA Cup 1st Round tie with PFC Lokomotiv Plovdiv in September 2005. In the 2005–06 season, O'Brien was called up by the first team following a defensive crisis of injuries and that moment on, he became a first team regular, making thirty-three appearances in all competition. Initially playing as a centre-midfielder, O'Brien changed to a right-back role and made an impression, leading to Manager Sam Allardyce described him as a "dominant force at right back in the Premiership".

O'Brien missed most of the 2006–07 season due to a knee injury. By October, O'Brien was expected to return from a pitch in a months time, with a help from an American doctor Dr Frank Jarrell, a pioneer in the field of spinal reflex analysis. However, his recovery was delayed for another 3–4 months, causing him to miss the rest of the season. Having regained his fitness, it wasn't until on 23 September 2007 when he made his return for Bolton, making his first start and playing the whole game, in a 1–0 win over Tottenham Hotspur. Since making his return from injury, he played most of the 2007–08 season in his natural midfield role as opposed to the right back position which he had been in two years previous. Despite further injury concerns, O'Brien went on to make 26 appearances in all competition.

In July 2008 he was given the number 8 shirt previously worn by Iván Campo and started well when he provided two assists against Stoke City and Arsenal. However, injuries restricted his appearances throughout the 2008–09 season. O'Brien finished the season, making eight appearances in all competitions.

In the 2009–10 season, O'Brien appeared as an unused substitute three times to the first ten league matches to the season. However, he suffered a knee injury that required an operation for the second time in twelve months and made no appearances this season. Despite this, he signed a one-year extension to his contract keeping him at Bolton Wanderers until the summer of 2011. After making a recovery, O'Brien made his return in a pre-season friendly match against Charleston Battery and after the match, O'Brien stated when he returned to the first team, he determined to make up the lost time. However, this never happened and it has been reported that O'Brien may need to be loaned out to gain first team football.

On 24 March 2011, O'Brien joined Sheffield Wednesday on loan for a second time until the end of the season, and made his debut two days later in a 1–1 draw at Dagenham & Redbridge. After making four appearances for the club, O'Brien made four appearances for the club on his second return. At the end of the season, he was released by Bolton Wanderers, ending his six years association with the club.

=== West Ham United ===
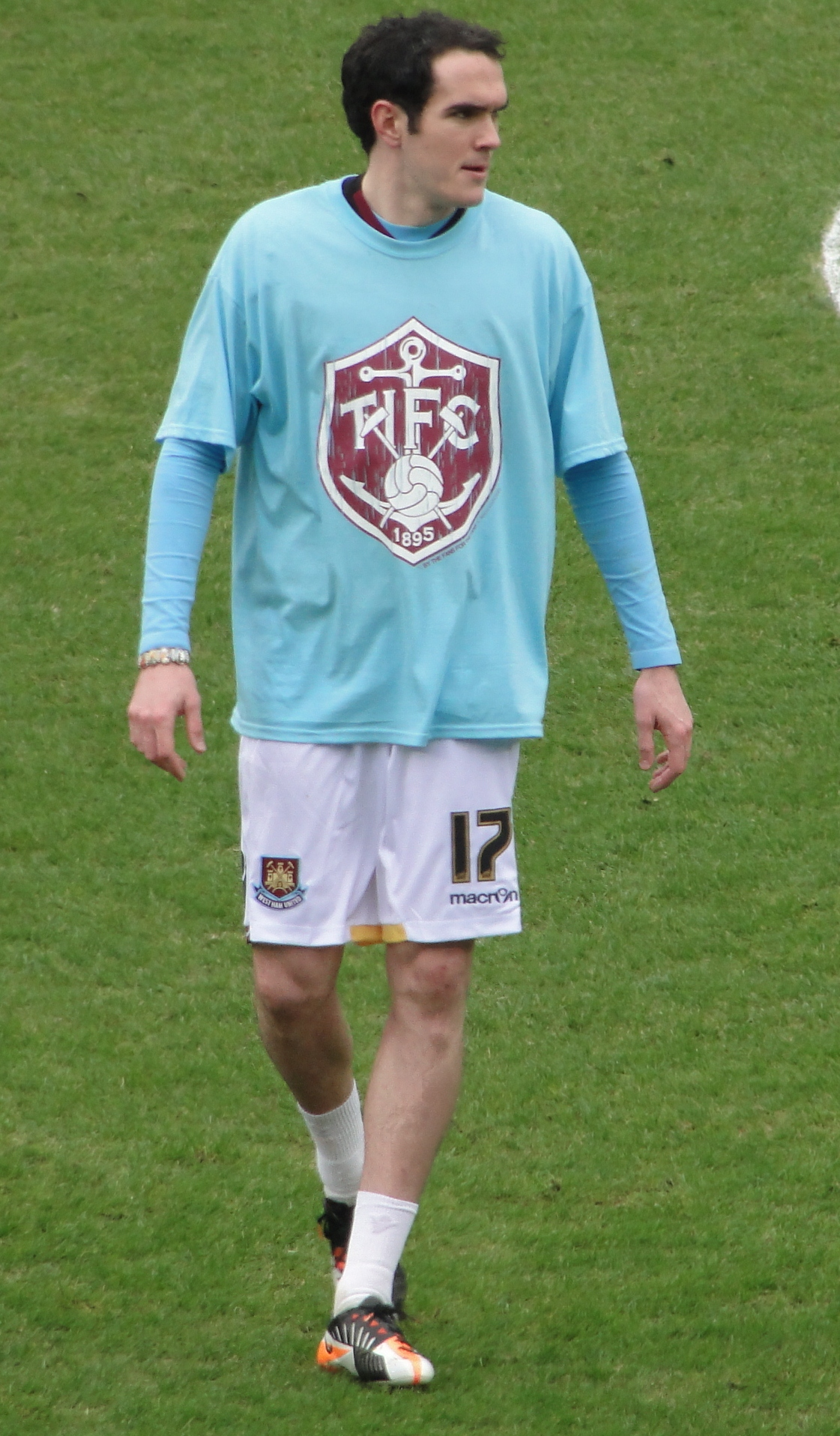
O'Brien warming-up for West Ham United, February 2012.

In July 2011, O'Brien was handed a trial by West Ham United. He featured in pre-season friendlies against BSC Young Boys and Basel before being signed on 30 July on a free transfer, after penning a two-year contract.

O'Brien made his competitive debut on 7 August 2011 in 1–0 home defeat to Cardiff City. He scored his first goal for West Ham in a 4–0 away win against Watford on 16 August 2011, his first goal since January 2005. He was sent off for the first time in his career in the away match against Reading on 10 December 2011. Having suffered from injuries during the season, O'Brien went on to make 33 appearances in all competition and the club was promoted back to the Premier League.

O'Brien suffered a hamstring injury on 5 October 2012. He returned to the squad for a match against Wigan Athletic three weeks later. He set up the only goal for Kevin Nolan in the game two weeks after making his return, in a 1–0 win over Newcastle United. This was followed by scoring his first ever Premier League goal on 19 November 2012, which also earned his team a point against Stoke. He then scored the winning goal in the New Year's Day fixture against Norwich City. However, O'Brien suffered a hamstring injury. While on sidelined, O'Brien signed a new contract with West Ham United on 13 January 2013, keeping him until 2013. Soon after signing the contract, he made his first appearance since returning from injury on 19 January 2013, in a 1–1 draw against Queens Park Rangers. O'Brien finished the 2012–13 season with 34 appearances in all competitions.

In the 2013–14 season, O'Brien's was restricted to 17 appearances. After missing out two matches between 11 January 2014 and 18 January 2014 due to injury O'Brien made his return on 29 January 2014, making his first start and playing the whole game, in a 0–0 draw against Chelsea. In the same match he suffered a dislocated shoulder after he "fell awkwardly following an off-the-ball push from Chelsea defender Gary Cahill" and was sidelined for three months. After returning from injury in late April, O'Brien made his return in the last game of the season, playing as a right-back, in a 2–0 loss against Manchester City.

In the 2014–15 season, O'Brien appeared in the first three matches to the start of the season until he suffered a knee injury during an international break. After making his return from injury as an unused substitute against Burnley on 18 October 2014, he struggled to regain his first team place and spent most of the season on the substitute bench, due to good performance from Carl Jenkinson.

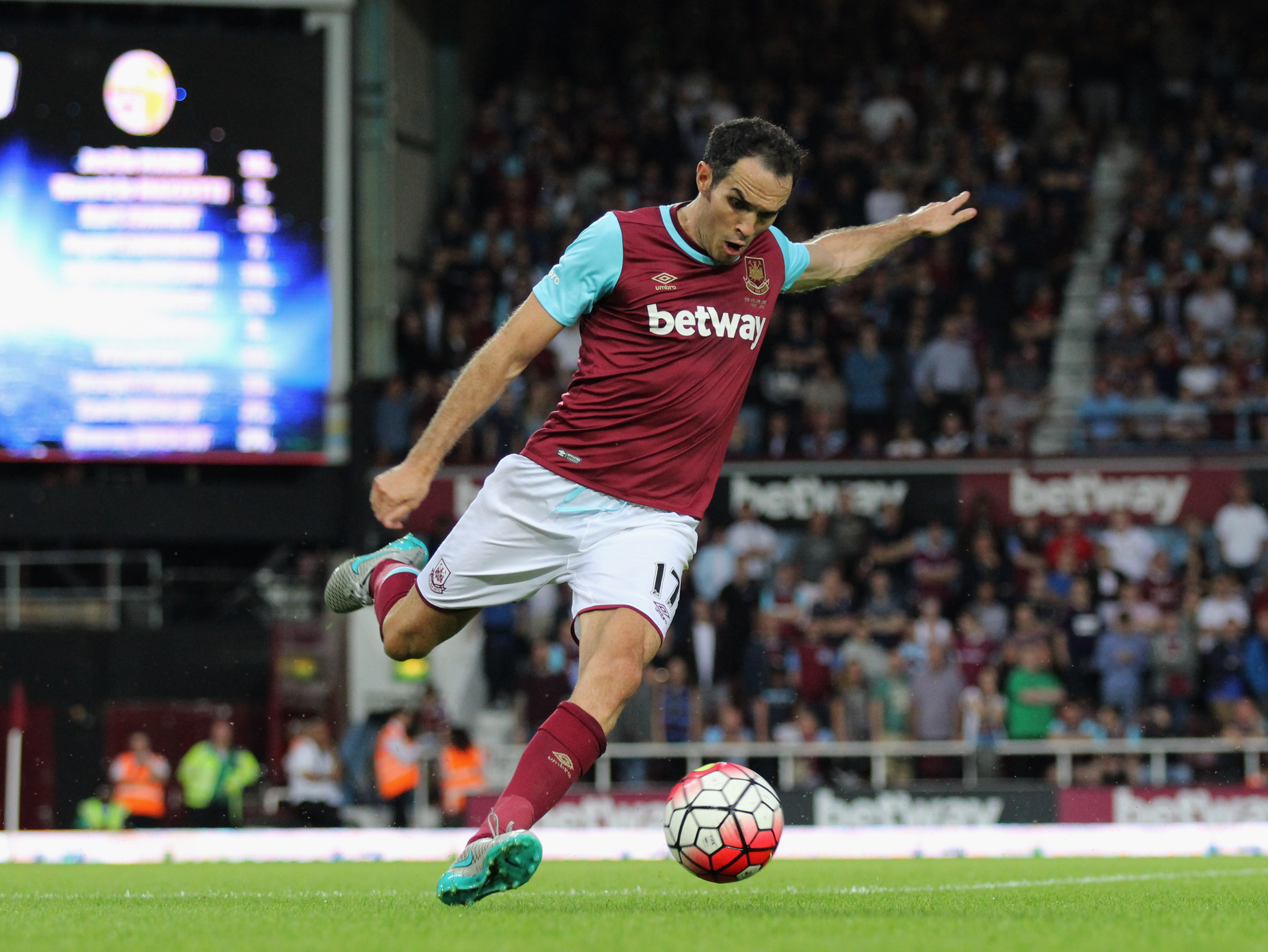
O'Brien playing against Birkirkara in the Europa League in 2015

Ahead of the 2015–16 season, O'Brien was expected to fight for his first team place under the new management of Slaven Bilić following the departure of Allardyce. After appearing five times in the Europa League matches for West Ham United campaign, he suffered a calf injury at the start of the season. After returning from injury in late-October, O'Brien made his first appearance on 30 January 2016, in the fourth round of the FA Cup, in a 0–0 against Liverpool. He then made another appearance in the fourth round of the FA Cup replay against Liverpool, which saw West Ham United win 2–1. Following a game with a win over Liverpool O'Brien once again suffered a hamstring injury that kept him out for weeks and even after making his return, he never made an appearance throughout the 2015–16 season.

He was released by West Ham at the end of his contract in June 2016.

In August 2017, he was back in Bolton, training with Bolton Wanderers fitness coach Nick Allamby in order to keep fit.

=== Shamrock Rovers ===
On 27 January 2018, O'Brien signed for League of Ireland team and boyhood club Shamrock Rovers after spending 18 months without a club.

== International career ==
In 2003, O'Brien was called by Republic of Ireland U17 and was involved in the tournament, resulting being awarded Player of the Tournament, due to his performance. Two years later, O'Brien was called up by Republic of Ireland U21 and appeared in the squad six times. Later in the year, he won FAI Under 19 International Player of the Year.

In February 2006, O'Brien was called up to the Republic of Ireland squad for the first time and made his debut for his country on 1 March 2006, against Sweden during Steve Staunton's first game in charge. Following a new appointment of Giovanni Trapattoni, O'Brien expressed frustration of being omitted by him that he was considered early retirement from international football.

On 3 August 2012, O'Brien was called up to the Republic of Ireland squad for 15 August friendly against Serbia, as a replacement for the injured Sean St Ledger. This was O'Brien's first call up in over four years, after overcoming a succession of long-term injuries.

== Coaching career ==
In November 2021, it was announced that O'Brien had joined Shelbourne as assistant manager under newly appointed manager Damien Duff, a former Republic of Ireland teammate of O'Brien's. On 22 June 2025, it was announced that O'Brien would take interim charge of the team after Duff had stepped down as manager.

On 3 July 2025, he was named manager of Shelbourne on a permanent basis on a long-term contract. Within less than two months, O'Brien had taken the Reds to the 2025–26 UEFA Conference League league phase following a 5–1 aggregate win over Linfield, the club's first ever group stage/league phase qualification. On 25 June 2026, O'Brien was sacked 3 days after a 3–0 home defeat to rivals Bohemians, with the club lingering in 5th place, 14 points off the top of the league.

== Personal life ==
In May 2014, O'Brien married Joanne Martin, an Irish model, at St Augustine's Church on Thomas Street, Dublin.

In February 2016, O'Brien was among thirteen people to be named as a victim of fraud, committed by Stephen Ackerman. A month after leaving West Ham United, O'Brien testified in court in Ackerman's trial.

== Career statistics ==
=== Playing career ===
As of 22 November 2021

Appearances and goals by club, season and competition
Club	Season	League			National cup (Note: Includes FA Cup, FAI Cup)		League cup (Note: Includes Football League Cup, League of Ireland Cup)		Europe		Other		Total	
Club	Season	Division	Apps	Goals	Apps	Goals	Apps	Goals	Apps	Goals	Apps	Goals	Apps	Goals
Bolton Wanderers	2004–05	Premier League	1	0	0	0	1	0	—		—		2	0
Bolton Wanderers	2005–06	Premier League	23	0	3	0	2	0	6 (Note: Appearances in UEFA Cup)	0	—		34	0
Bolton Wanderers	2006–07	Premier League	0	0	0	0	0	0	—		—		0	0
Bolton Wanderers	2007–08	Premier League	19	0	1	0	1	0	5	0	—		26	0
Bolton Wanderers	2008–09	Premier League	7	0	0	0	1	0	—		—		8	0
Bolton Wanderers	2009–10	Premier League	0	0	0	0	0	0	—		—		0	0
Bolton Wanderers	2010–11	Premier League	0	0	0	0	0	0	—		—		0	0
Bolton Wanderers	Total		50	0	4	0	5	0	11	0	—		70	0
Sheffield Wednesday (loan)	2004–05	League One	15	2	0	0	0	0	—		0	0	15	2
Sheffield Wednesday (loan)	2010–11	League One	4	0	0	0	0	0	—		0	0	4	0
Sheffield Wednesday (loan)	Total		19	2	0	0	0	0	—		0	0	19	2
West Ham United	2011–12	Championship	32	1	1	0	0	0	—		0	0	33	1
West Ham United	2012–13	Premier League	33	2	0	0	1	0	—		—		34	2
West Ham United	2013–14	Premier League	17	0	0	0	3	0	—		—		20	0
West Ham United	2014–15	Premier League	9	0	2	0	0	0	—		—		11	0
West Ham United	2015–16	Premier League	0	0	2	0	0	0	5 (Note: Appearances in UEFA Europa League)	0	—		7	0
West Ham United	Total		91	3	5	0	4	0	5	0	—		105	3
Shamrock Rovers	2018	League of Ireland Premier Division	13	0	1	0	1	0	2	0	0	0	17	0
Shamrock Rovers	2019	League of Ireland Premier Division	24	2	2	0	0	0	4	0	0	0	30	2
Shamrock Rovers	2020	League of Ireland Premier Division	14	1	4	0	—		2	0	—		20	1
Shamrock Rovers	2021	League of Ireland Premier Division	12	1	2	0	—		5 (Note: One appearance in UEFA Champions League, four appearances in UEFA Europa Conference League)	0	1 (Note: Appearance in President of Ireland's Cup)	0	20	1
Shamrock Rovers	Total		63	4	9	0	1	0	13	0	1	0	87	4
Career total			223	9	18	0	10	0	29	0	1	0	281	9

=== Managerial career ===
As of match played 22 June 2026

Managerial record by team and tenure
Team	From	To	Record							
Team	From	To	G	W	D	L	GF	GA	GD	Win %
Shelbourne (interim)	22 June 2025	3 July 2025	2	0	2	0	3	3	+0	0.00
Shelbourne	3 July 2025	25 June 2026	54	22	15	17	75	71	+4	40.74
Total			56	22	17	17	78	74	+4	39.29

== Honours ==
West Ham United

- Football League Championship play-offs: 2011–12

Shamrock Rovers

- League of Ireland Premier Division: 2020, 2021
- FAI Cup: 2019
