= Ricardo Vaz Tê =

Portuguese footballer (born 1986)

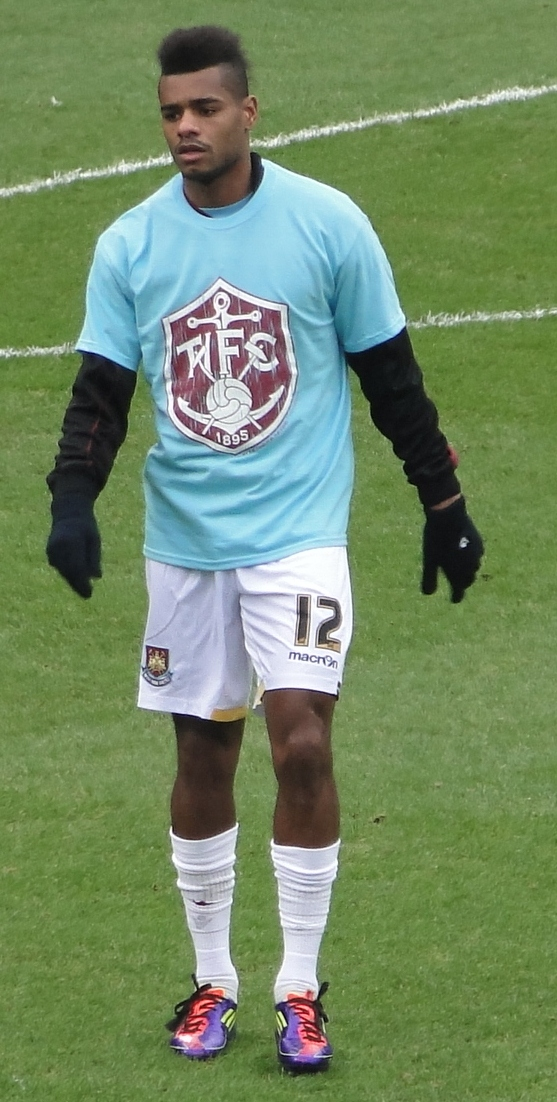
- Vaz Tê in 2012

Personal information
- Full name: Ricardo Jorge Vaz Tê
- Date of birth: 1 October 1986 (age 40)
- Place of birth: Lisbon, Portugal
- Height: 6 ft 2 in (1.88 m)
- Position: Forward

Youth career
- Real Massamá
- 2002–2003: Farense

Senior career*
Years	Team	Apps	(Gls)
2003–2010	Bolton Wanderers	58	(3)
2007	→ Hull City (loan)	6	(0)
2010–2011	Panionios	8	(1)
2011	Hibernian	10	(1)
2011–2012	Barnsley	22	(10)
2012–2015	West Ham United	51	(15)
2015	Akhisar Belediyespor	14	(5)
2015–2016	Charlton Athletic	11	(0)
2016–2017	Akhisar Belediyespor	45	(12)
2017–2018	Henan Jianye	26	(16)
2019	Qingdao Huanghai	14	(5)
2020–2021	Portimonense	21	(2)
Total		286	(70)

International career
2003	Portugal U17	2	(0)
2004–2005	Portugal U19	6	(4)
2005–2006	Portugal U20	9	(6)
2006–2007	Portugal U21	19	(4)
2008	Portugal U23	2	(2)
- * Club domestic league appearances and goals

Ricardo Jorge Vaz Tê (born 1 October 1986) is a Portuguese former professional footballer who played as a forward.

During his career, Vaz Tê played for English clubs Bolton Wanderers, Hull City, Barnsley and West Ham United, Greek club Panionios, Scottish Premier League club Hibernian, Turkish side Akhisar Belediyespor, and Portuguese club Portimonense.

== Early life ==
Vaz Tê was born in Lisbon, but moved a year later to live with his father in Guinea-Bissau, where he remained until he was 11 years old. He returned to Portugal and received professional coaching at SC Farense. Vaz Tê played youth football with his local club Real Massamá, a team which also included Manchester United winger Nani. Nani went to play for Sporting CP while Vaz Tê left for England to play for Bolton Wanderers. They also represented the Portugal Under-21s.

== Club career ==
=== Bolton Wanderers ===
Vaz Tê went on trial with Bolton Wanderers in 2003 and he was signed on a three-year youth academy contract. He made such an impression at youth level that Vaz Tê quickly found himself part of the Bolton first-team squad. He made his debut in their FA Cup tie with Tranmere Rovers in January 2004. Just over two months later, he made his Premier League debut in a 2–0 defeat at Middlesbrough. He made his first full start in the game with Manchester United at Old Trafford in December 2004.

In 2005–06, Vaz Tê was again involved in first-team action, starting 7 games and coming on as a substitute in another 22. He scored 6 goals in all competitions, one of which a late equaliser shortly after coming on as a substitute on 24 November 2005, at Vitória de Guimarães. In March 2007, Vaz Tê joined Hull City on a month's loan from Bolton.

He had an unlucky beginning to the 2007–08 season, damaging his ligaments on the opening day. He only appeared in one more game throughout that season, a 0–1 defeat to Sporting CP in the UEFA Cup in which Bolton Manager Gary Megson played mostly a reserve team. In August 2008, there was confusion regarding the player, when it was widely reported that he had signed for Racing de Santander on loan as part of a swap deal that would see fellow striker Ebi Smolarek go the other way. However, although Smolarek did join Bolton, the Portuguese striker also remained at the club. He made only two appearances in the 2008–09 season and none in the 2009–10 season, as he required four operations on his right knee and one on his left knee. On 11 May 2010, Vaz Tê was released by Bolton Wanderers.

=== Panionios ===
On 30 June 2010 it was reported that Vaz Tê had signed a three-year deal with Greek Super League club Panionios. In December 2010, after less than six months in Greece, it was announced that Vaz Tê and Panionios had come to an agreement to mutually terminate his contract. Panionios had suffered financial problems, which meant that Vaz Tê went four months without receiving any pay.

=== Hibernian ===
Vaz Tê went on trial with Scottish Premier League club Hibernian in February 2011 and manager Colin Calderwood stated that both parties were in discussions about a contract. The signing was confirmed on 28 February. Vaz Tê made his debut for the club in a 1–1 draw against St Johnstone on 5 March as a substitute. He scored one goal for Hibs, in an Edinburgh derby against Hearts. His contract was not renewed at the end of the season. Vaz Tê later said that he had played for Hibs for "no money", but had chosen to go there due to the "visibility" of Scottish football in neighbouring England.

=== Barnsley ===
Vaz Tê went on trial with Football League Championship club Barnsley in July 2011, every other Championship club having rejected that opportunity. He impressed the club management and scored a goal in a friendly against Grimsby Town. On 3 August 2011 he agreed a contract with Barnsley until the end of the 2011–12 season. He scored his first goal for Barnsley in a 2–0 win against Burnley on 18 October 2011. Vaz Tê scored his fifth Barnsley goal on 6 December 2011 against Crystal Palace after only 8.5 seconds, the fastest goal in Barnsley history. He scored again later in the game to give Barnsley a 2–1 win. On 31 December, Vaz Tê scored a hat-trick in a 4–1 win against Leeds United, after coming on as a substitute. Sky Sports reported on 1 January 2012 that Vaz Tê had rejected Barnsley's offer of a new contract. He scored both of the Barnsley goals in a 4–2 defeat against Swansea City in an FA Cup third round tie.

=== West Ham United ===
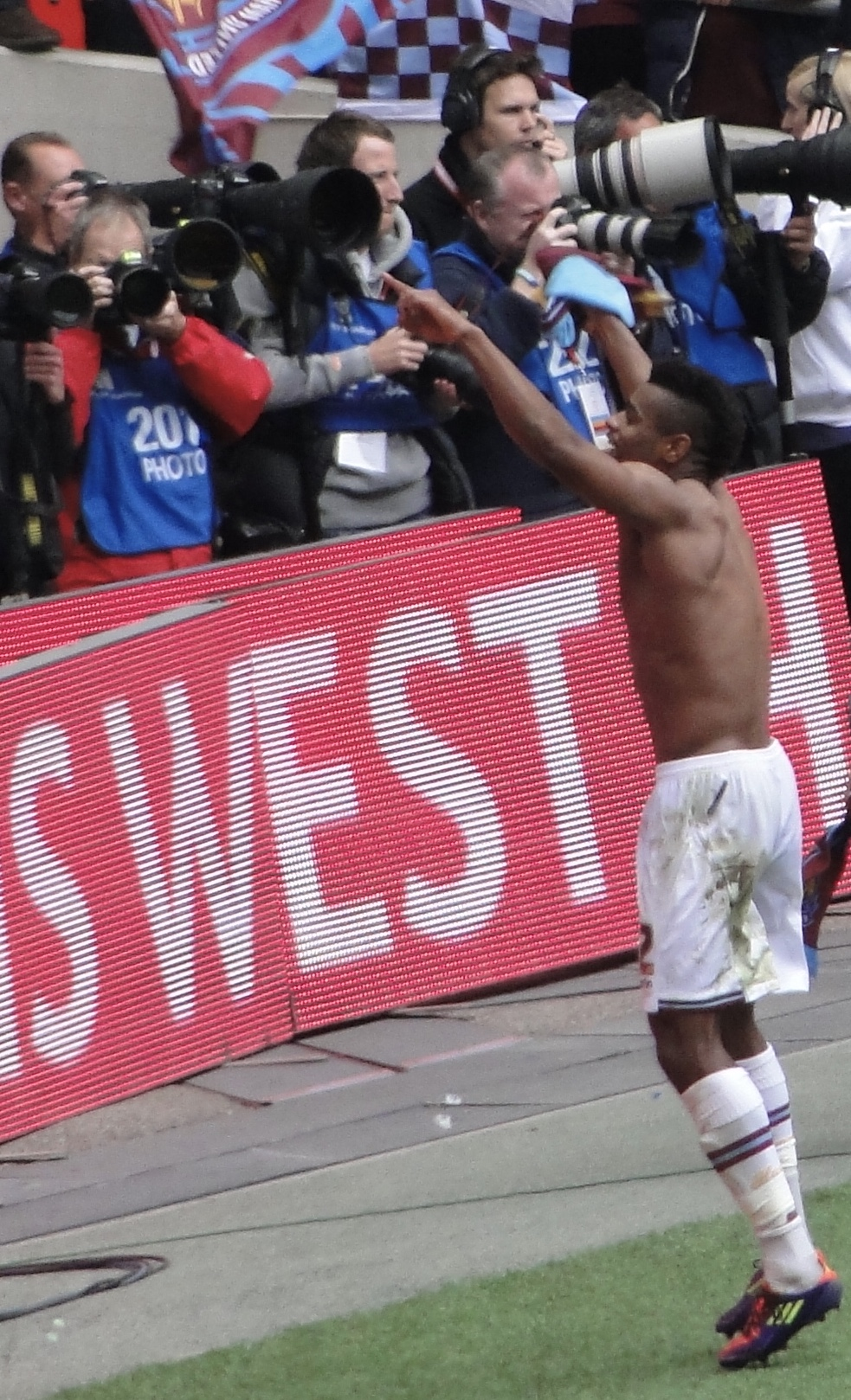
Vaz Tê celebrates at the end of the 2012 Championship Play-off Final

Vaz Tê signed for then Championship club West Ham United on 31 January 2012, for an undisclosed fee on a 2 1/2-year deal with an option for a third year. Vaz Tê made his debut for the club, coming on as an 89th-minute substitute for Carlton Cole in the London derby against Millwall on 4 February. The game finished 2–1 to West Ham United. On 21 February 2012, Vaz Tê scored his first goal for the Hammers, in a 4–1 victory at Blackpool. Nicky Maynard and Gary O'Neil also scored their first professional goals for the club. Vaz Tê scored his first hat-trick for West Ham on 14 April 2012, in West Ham United's 6–0 home victory against Brighton & Hove Albion. West Ham finished 3rd behind Southampton entering the play-offs against Cardiff City. They won the first leg at the Cardiff City Stadium 2–0 and the second leg 3–0 at the Upton Park, with Vaz Tê scoring the second goal of the second game. West Ham progressed to the play-off final with a 5–0 aggregate victory. In the play-off final at Wembley on 19 May 2012, Vaz Tê scored the winning goal in the 87th minute against Blackpool. It was the 24th goal Vaz Tê had scored in the 2011–12 season.

He was in the starting line-up from the beginning of the 2012–13 season scoring his first Premier League goal for West Ham in their 2–1 away win at QPR on 1 October 2012. In the very next game, on 6 October 2012 at home to Arsenal, Vaz Tê dislocated his shoulder, an injury which kept him out of the team for nearly 3 months. Vaz Tê returned to the side on 29 December in an away game at Reading, he was brought on with 23 minutes remaining and his side down 1–0 and went on to miss a glaring opportunity to draw the match, as West Ham lost. Sam Allardyce said it was one of the "easiest" chances to score in the Premier League.

He started the 2013–14 season as a 90th-minute substitute, replacing Joe Cole, in a 2–0 home win against Cardiff City. He scored his first goal of the season in a League Cup second round fixture against Cheltenham Town on 27 August 2013, when he scored the opening goal from a free-kick in 42nd minute of the match, which ended a 2–1 win for West Ham. He later received a Goal of the Month club award for that goal. After the Cheltenham win, on 28 August 2013, Vaz Tê handed in a transfer request. His statement regarding this said, "The statistics are evident to all but, despite this, it has been made obvious to myself and my representatives that I am not in the manager's plans. Therefore, it is with a heavy heart that I submit a transfer request and look to join a club where my approach to the game will be appreciated." He has remained at West Ham for at least until the winter transfer period and has committed himself to the club. Following his transfer request Vaz Te played four games in September 2013, scoring once and three games in October scoring twice, in games against Tottenham Hotspur and Manchester City. These proved to be his last goals for the club. In his next game, on 27 October 2013, he dislocated his shoulder against Swansea City. He did not return to the first team until 15 April 2014 when he played 12 minutes against Arsenal in a 1–3 defeat.

In the 2014–15 season he was rarely picked by manager Sam Allardyce making only four league appearances and one in the League Cup. His last game came on 22 November 2014 in a 2–1 away defeat to Everton and on 17 January 2015, his contract was terminated by the club.

=== Akhisar Belediyespor ===
On 18 January 2015, Vaz Tê joined Turkish Süper Lig side Akhisar Belediyespor on a six-month contract. He played just 14 games; scoring on five occasions.

=== Charlton Athletic ===
On 13 November 2015, Vaz Tê signed for Charlton Athletic on a free transfer until the end of the season. However, he was released from his contract in February 2016.

=== China ===
On 14 July 2017, Vaz Tê transferred to Chinese Super League side Henan Jianye. Vaz Tê transferred to China League One side Qingdao Huanghai in February 2019.

=== Portimonense ===
After his stint in China, Vaz Tê moved back to Portugal, signing for Primeira Liga club Portimonense. Following the end of the 2020/21 season, Vaz Tê had his contract mutually terminated and was released by the Portuguese club.

== International career ==
In the summer of 2005, Vaz Tê took part in the annual Toulon tournament scoring a hat-trick for Portugal U-20s, in their game with South Korea. He then played regularly for the Portugal under-21 team.

== Retirement ==
Vaz Te was appointed Technical Director at BWP Football Academy in 2025.

== Career statistics ==
As of 10 May 2021

Appearances and goals by club, season and competition
Club	Season	League			National cup (Note: Includes FA Cup, Turkish Cup)		League cup (Note: Includes Football League Cup)		Other		Total	
Club	Season	Division	Apps	Goals	Apps	Goals	Apps	Goals	Apps	Goals	Apps	Goals
Bolton Wanderers	2003–04	Premier League	1	0	2	0	0	0	–		3	0
Bolton Wanderers	2004–05	Premier League	7	0	2	1	0	0	–		9	1
Bolton Wanderers	2005–06	Premier League	22	3	4	1	2	1	4 (Note: Appearances in UEFA Cup)	1	32	6
Bolton Wanderers	2006–07	Premier League	25	0	3	0	2	0	–		30	0
Bolton Wanderers	2007–08	Premier League	1	0	0	0	0	0	1	0	2	0
Bolton Wanderers	2008–09	Premier League	2	0	0	0	0	0	–		2	0
Bolton Wanderers	Total		58	3	11	2	4	1	5	1	78	7
Hull City (loan)	2006–07	Championship	6	0	0	0	0	0	–		6	0
Panionios	2010–11	Super League Greece	8	1	0	0	–		–		8	1
Hibernian	2010–11	Scottish Premier League	10	1	0	0	0	0	–		10	1
Barnsley	2011–12	Championship	22	10	1	2	1	0	–		24	12
West Ham United	2011–12	Championship	15	10	0	0	0	0	3 (Note: Appearances in Football League Championship play-offs)	2	18	12
West Ham United	2012–13	Premier League	24	3	2	0	2	0	–		28	3
West Ham United	2013–14	Premier League	8	2	0	0	2	2	–		10	4
West Ham United	2014–15	Premier League	4	0	0	0	1	0	–		5	0
West Ham United	Total	51	15	2	0	5	2	3	2	61	19	
Akhisar Belediyespor	2014–15	Süper Lig	14	5	0	0	–		–		14	5
Charlton Athletic	2015–16	Championship	11	0	1	0	0	0	–		12	0
Akhisar Belediyespor	2015–16	Süper Lig	14	1	2	0	–		–		16	1
Akhisar Belediyespor	2016–17	Süper Lig	31	11	9	14	–		–		40	25
Akhisar Belediyespor	Total		45	12	11	14	–		–		56	26
Henan Jianye	2017	Chinese Super League	5	5	0	0	–		–		5	5
Henan Jianye	2018	Chinese Super League	21	11	0	0	–		–		21	11
Henan Jianye	Total		26	16	0	0	–		–		26	16
Qingdao Huanghai	2019	China League One	14	5	0	0	–		–		14	5
Portimonense	2019–20	Primeira Liga	12	2	0	0	0	0	–		12	2
Portimonense	2020–21	Primeira Liga	9	0	0	0	0	0	–		9	0
Portimonense	Total		21	2	0	0	0	0	–		21	2
Career total			286	70	26	18	10	3	8	3	330	94

== Honours ==
West Ham United

- Football League Championship play-offs: 2012

Qingdao Huanghai

- China League One: 2019
