= Guy Demel =

Ivorian footballer (born 1981)

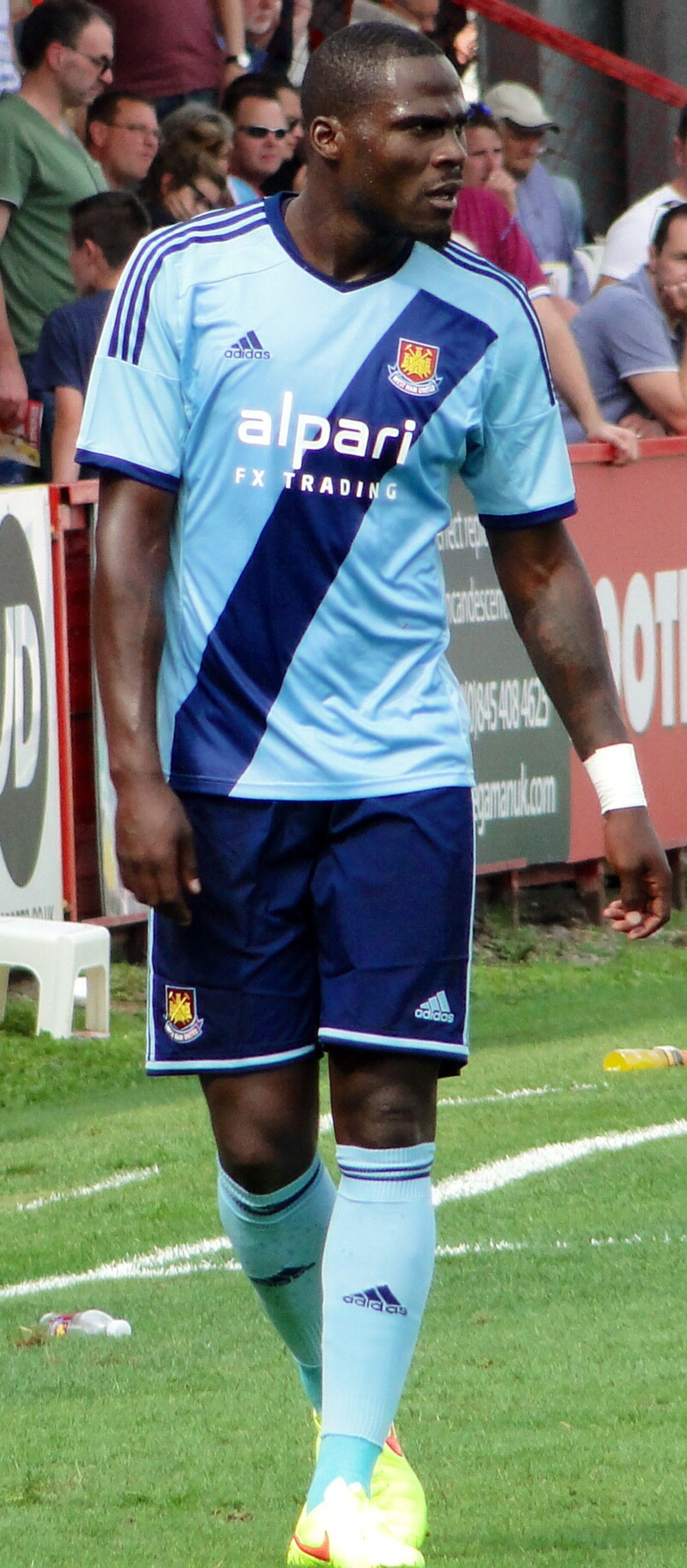
- Demel playing for West Ham in 2014.

Personal information
- Full name: Guy Roland Demel
- Date of birth: 13 June 1981 (age 45)
- Place of birth: Orsay, France
- Height: 1.88 m (6 ft 2 in)
- Position: Right back

Team information
- Current team: Ivory Coast (assistant coach)

Senior career*
Years	Team	Apps	(Gls)
1999–2000	Nîmes	1	(0)
2000–2001	Arsenal	0	(0)
2001–2005	Borussia Dortmund II	43	(9)
2001–2005	Borussia Dortmund	33	(0)
2005–2011	Hamburger SV	131	(2)
2006	Hamburger SV II	1	(0)
2011–2015	West Ham United	76	(1)
2015–2016	Dundee United	12	(1)
2016–2017	Marseille Consolat	4	(0)
2017	Red Star	4	(0)
Total		302	(13)

International career
2004–2012	Ivory Coast	31	(0)

Managerial career
- 2024–: Ivory Coast (assistant)
- * Club domestic league appearances and goals

Guy Roland Demel (born 13 June 1981) is an Ivorian former professional footballer who played as a defender. He has been assistant coach of the Ivory Coast national football team since January 2024.

He could play in several positions including right back and centre back. Demel started his career in France with Nîmes Olympique before joining English club Arsenal in 2000. He then played in Germany for ten years, signing for Borussia Dortmund in 2001 and then Hamburger SV in 2005. He returned to England with West Ham United in 2011, leaving the club in 2015 and subsequently joining Dundee United.

Demel was born in France but represented the Ivory Coast national team from 2004 until his international retirement in 2012, making 35 appearances. He was in the Ivorian squad for the 2006 and 2010 World Cups and the 2006 Africa Cup of Nations.

== Club career ==
Born in Orsay, France, Demel started his professional career in the French Ligue 2 with Nîmes Olympique. He was signed by Arsenal in August 2000 spending one season in London without making a first team appearance before being transferred to Borussia Dortmund. He made his Bundesliga debut in 2003 winning the Bundesliga and making UEFA Cup Final in his first season. Demel left Dortmund to join Hamburg in 2005, after struggling to hold down a first team place.

With Hamburg, Demel played regularly as both a right back and a midfielder. In May 2006, he signed a new contract with Hamburg, tying him to the club until 2010.

Demel was released by Hamburg at the expiry of his contract in 2011. He made 199 appearances for Hamburg including 52 in European football in the UEFA Cup, UEFA Europa League and the 2006–07 UEFA Champions League, scoring four goals.

=== West Ham United ===
He signed a two-year deal, with the option of a third, with West Ham on 31 August 2011. Due to injuries it was not until 29 November 2011, in a 2–0 away win against Middlesbrough, that Demel made his West Ham United debut. With West Ham playing in the Championship, Demel played 10 games in the 2011–12 season, eight of them after coming on as substitute. On 19 May 2012, he was a member of the team which won promotion to the Premier League after beating Blackpool in the 2012 Football League Championship play-off final at Wembley Stadium. He played the first 57 minutes before being replaced by Julien Faubert. On 23 January 2013, Demel extended his contract with West Ham until 2015. Demel scored his only West Ham goal in a 2–1 home defeat by Liverpool on 6 April 2014. After West Ham striker, Andy Carroll challenged Liverpool goalkeeper, Simon Mignolet, the goalkeeper dropped the ball and Demel scored from 3 yards (2.7 m) out. Demel was first-choice right-back for the 2012–13 and 2013–14 seasons playing 31 and 32 games respectively. By the 2014–15 season, Carl Jenkinson was first-choice and Demel managed only six games all season. He was released at the end of the 2014–15 season.

=== Dundee United ===
In November 2015, Demel signed for Dundee United until the end of the 2015–16 season. He scored his first goal for Dundee United in a 2–1 win over Hearts on 20 February 2016. Following confirmation of the club's relegation from the Scottish Premiership, Demel was allowed to leave the club and return to France before the end of the season, despite still being under contract.

== International career ==
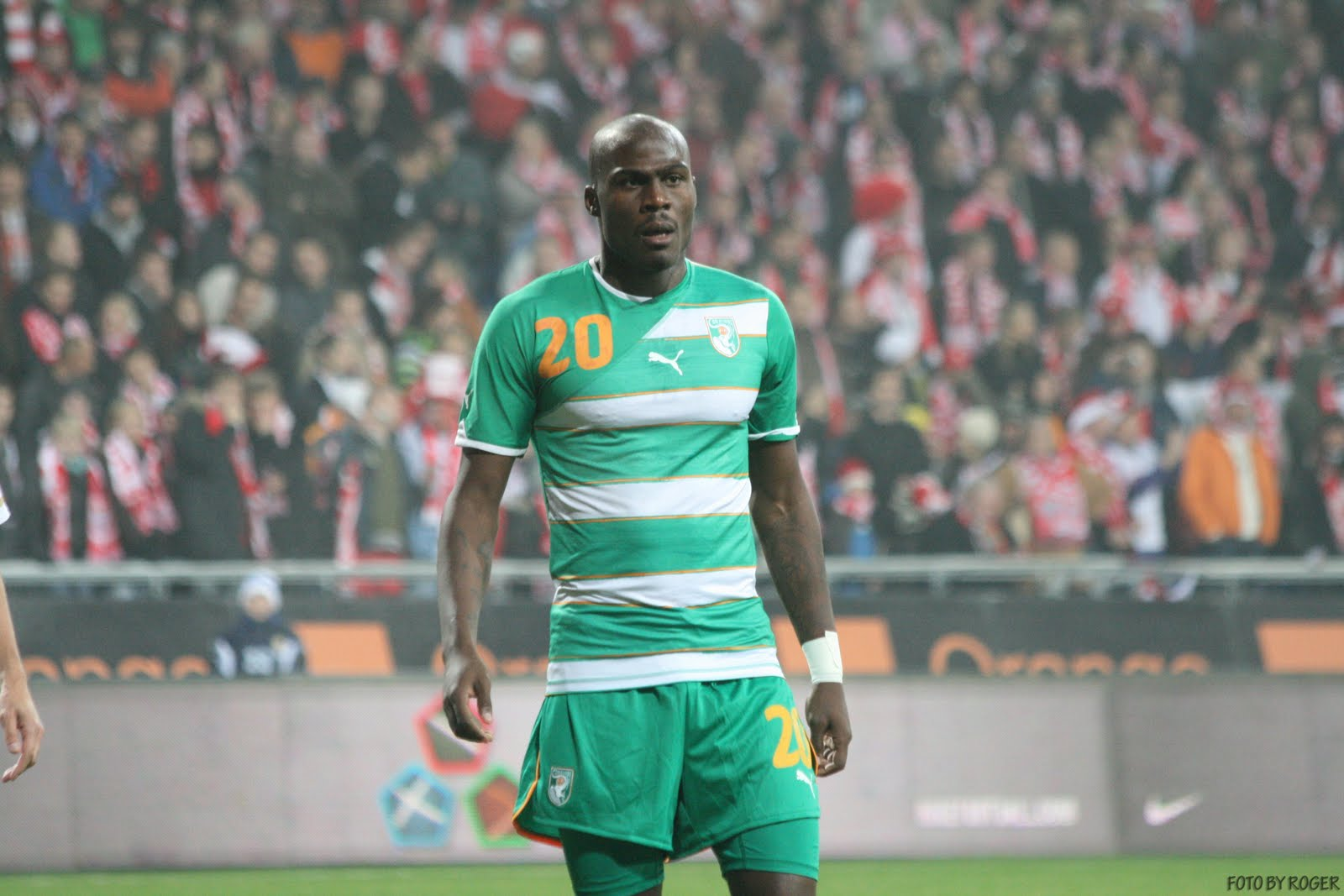
Demel playing for the Ivory Coast

In 2004, Demel, a French citizen, acquired an Ivorian passport. He has since been selected for the national team, playing at the 2006 Africa Cup of Nations, and being named to the squad for the 2006 and 2010 World Cup finals. Demel announced his retirement from international football on 6 December 2012 confirming his wish to focus on his club career with West Ham United.

== Career statistics ==
=== International ===
National team	Year	Apps	Goals
Ivory Coast
Ivory Coast	2004	2	0
Ivory Coast	2005	3	0
Ivory Coast	2006	2	0
Ivory Coast	2007	1	0
Ivory Coast	2008	6	0
Ivory Coast	2009	6	0
Ivory Coast	2010	8	0
Ivory Coast	2011	3	0
Total		31	0

== Honours ==
Borussia Dortmund

- Bundesliga: 2001–02

Hamburger SV

- UEFA Intertoto Cup: 2005, 2007

West Ham United

- Football League Championship play-offs: 2012

Ivory Coast

- Africa Cup of Nations runner-up: 2006
