= 2012–13 West Ham United F.C. season =

English football team season

West Ham United F.C.
2012–13 season
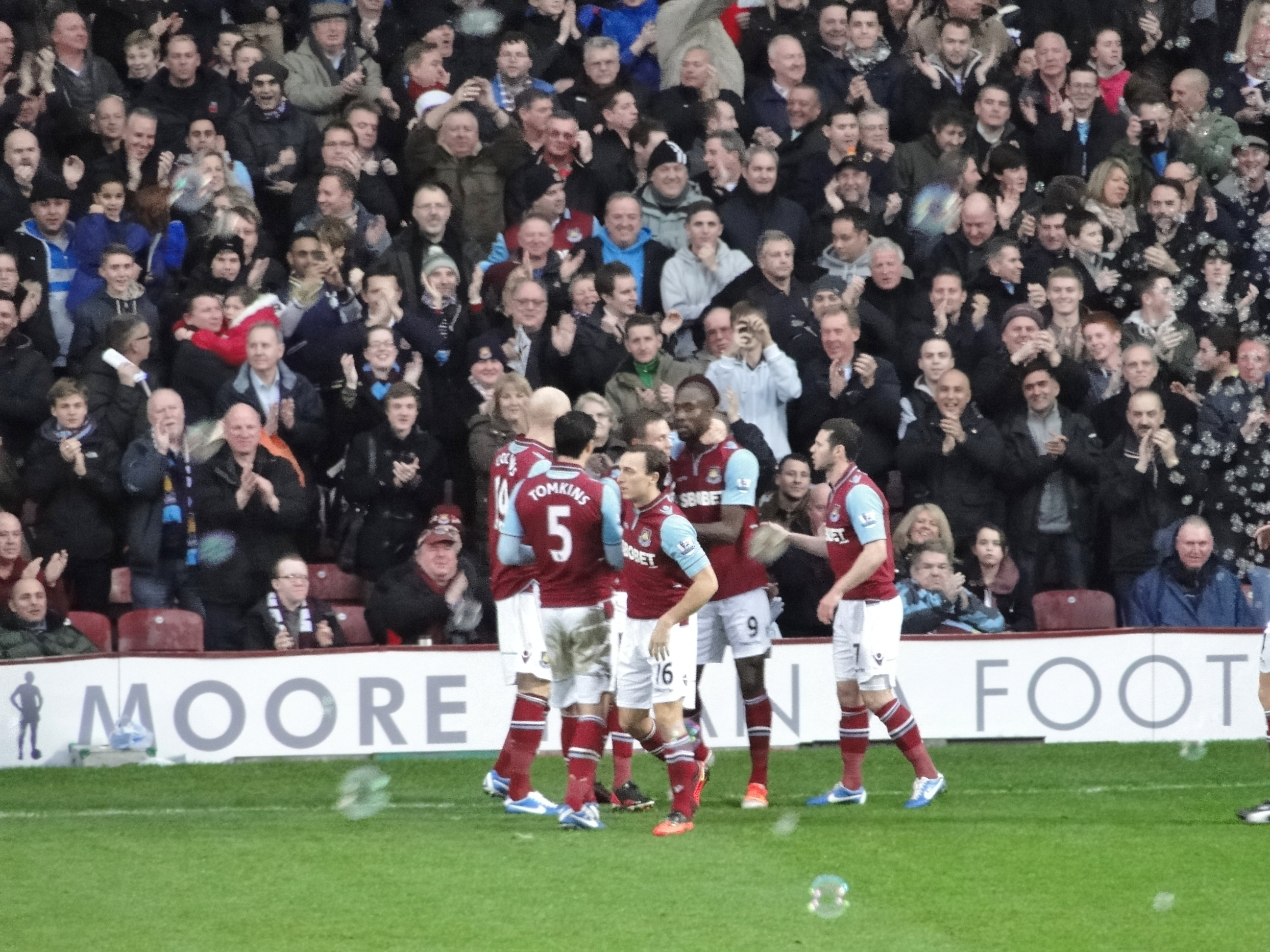
- West Ham United players during a match against Everton in December 2012
- Chairman: David Gold; David Sullivan
- Manager: Sam Allardyce
- Stadium: Boleyn Ground
- Premier League: 10th
- FA Cup: Third round
- League Cup: Third round
- Top goalscorer: League: Kevin Nolan (10); All: Kevin Nolan (10)
- Highest home attendance: 35,005 vs. Manchester City, Stoke City, Chelsea, Liverpool, Everton, Norwich City & Tottenham Hotspur
- Lowest home attendance: 18,053 vs. Crewe Alexandra (League Cup 2nd Round)
| Home colours | Away colours | Third colours |

The 2012–13 season was West Ham United's first season back in the Premier League after a one-year absence. West Ham gained promotion by winning the 2012 Championship play-off final against Blackpool at the end of the 2011–12 campaign.

== Season summary ==
- 21 May 2012: West Ham announced the signing of goalkeeper Stephen Henderson making him the first signing in this transfer window.
- 23 May 2012: West Ham United released six senior players following the conclusion of the 2011–2012 season. Among those departing were Julien Faubert, John Carew, Abdoulaye Faye, Papa Bouba Diop, Frank Nouble and Olly Lee.
- 13 June 2012: West Ham United sign goalkeeper Jussi Jääskeläinen on a free transfer to join the club when his contract at Bolton Wanderers expires.
- 20 June 2012: West Ham United announce the signing of midfielder Mohamed Diamé to join the club after the expiration of his contract at Wigan Athletic.
- 21 June 2012: After nearly six years with the club, goalkeeper Robert Green fails to agree a new contract and moves to Queens Park Rangers on a free transfer.
- 1 July 2012: West Ham United announce the signing of George McCartney from Sunderland after a successful loan stint at West Ham during the 2011–12 promotion winning season. West Ham also announce the departure of Marek Štěch by mutual consent.
- 18 July 2012: The club announce the signing of forward Modibo Maïga for an undisclosed fee from French club Sochaux.
- 23 July 2012: The signing of young Swiss goalkeeper Raphael Spiegel from Grasshoppers for an undisclosed fee is announced.
- 1 August 2012: The club announces the return of experienced defender James Collins on a four-year deal for an undisclosed fee from Aston Villa.
- 10 August 2012: The transfer of French midfielder Alou Diarra from Marseille on a three-year contract for an undisclosed fee is confirmed.
- 18 August 2012: West Ham kick the season off with a 1–0 home win against Aston Villa. James Collins, Jussi Jääskeläinen, Mohamed Diamé and Modibo Maïga all make their competitive debuts.
- 24 August 2012: The club announces the signing of winger Matt Jarvis from Wolverhampton Wanderers on a five-year contract, with the option for an additional year, for a transfer fee which was a club record but was officially undisclosed.
- 25 August 2012: West Ham travel to Swansea City for their first away match of the season and are comfortably beaten 3–0.
- 30 August 2012: Liverpool striker, Andy Carroll signs on a season-long loan with the option to complete a permanent deal for an undisclosed fee in the summer of 2013.
- 31 August 2012: Yossi Benayoun signs on-loan from Chelsea for the season, becoming their 11th signing of the transfer window.
- 1 September 2012: West Ham bounce back from defeat by Swansea by beating Fulham 3–0 at home.
- 12 September 2012: West Ham's oldest surviving player, Jimmy Andrews, dies aged 85.
- 15 September 2012: West Ham earn their first away points of the season in a 0–0 draw with Norwich City.
- 22 September 2012: West Ham's 100% home record is ended by a 1–1 draw with Sunderland.
- 25 September 2012: Just over a year after being diagnosed with testicular cancer, striker Dylan Tombides makes his debut for West Ham in a 4–1 home defeat by Wigan in the League Cup
- 1 October 2012: Eight players receive a yellow card, a Premier League record, as West Ham record their first away win of the season, a 2–1 win at QPR with goals by Matt Jarvis, his first for the club, and Ricardo Vaz Tê.
- 6 October 2012: The Hammers lose against London rivals Arsenal 3–1 at home. Mohamed Diamé scores his first goal for the club.
- 20 October 2012: Fellow promotees Southampton are comfortably beaten 4–1 at Upton Park.
- 27 October 2012: West Ham lose their second away game of the season 2–1 against Wigan.
- 3 November 2012: The current Premier League champions Manchester City are held to a 0–0 draw by West Ham.
- 11 November 2012: West Ham win outside London for the first time this season with a 1–0 away win at Newcastle United. It is also their first win away to Newcastle since 1998.
- 19 November 2012: The Hammers extend their unbeaten run to three games with a 1–1 draw against Stoke City.
- 25 November 2012: West Ham are beaten 3–1 by London rivals Tottenham Hotspur. Andy Carroll scores his first goal for the club.
- 28 November 2012: Manchester United defeat West Ham 1–0 at Old Trafford.
- 1 December 2012: West Ham announce that on loan striker Andy Carroll has been ruled out for up to eight weeks due to a knee injury. Later that day, the Hammers complete an emphatic victory against London rivals Chelsea, winning 3–1.
- 5 December 2012: West Ham are named preferred tenants for the Olympic Stadium.
- 9 December 2012: West Ham lose 2–3 at home to Liverpool after leading 2–1 at half time. Mohamed Diamé tears his hamstring in the match.
- 16 December 2012: West Ham pick up a point at The Hawthorns, drawing 0–0 to West Bromwich Albion.
- 19 December 2012: The Boxing Day clash away at Arsenal is called off due to industrial action on the London Underground.
- 22 December 2012: Carlton Cole picks up West Ham's first red card of the season in a 2–1 defeat by Everton.
- 27 December 2012: The FA overturns Cole's red card he picked up against Everton after a successful appeal.
- 29 December 2012: West Ham are beaten 1–0 by fellow promotees Reading.
- 1 January 2013: The Hammers start 2013 with a home win against Norwich, 2–1. Joey O'Brien celebrates his 50th appearance for the club with a goal.
- 5 January 2013 Recently signed from Liverpool, Joe Cole provides the assists for both goals, scored by James Collins, in a 2–2 home draw with Manchester United in the FA Cup third round.
- 9 January 2013: West Ham co-chairman David Gold is admitted to hospital suffering from pneumonia.
- 12 January 2013: West Ham lose for the first time in 2013 after being beaten 3–0 by Sunderland at the Stadium of Light.
- 16 January 2013: A 1–0 defeat by Manchester United at Old Trafford sees West Ham exit the FA Cup in the third round.
- 19 January 2013: Joe Cole rescues a point for West Ham who draw 1–1 at home with QPR.
- 23 January 2013: A 5–1 defeat by Arsenal at the Emirates gives West Ham their heaviest defeat of the season in a match which also sees Dan Potts taken to hospital with concussion.
- 22 March 2013: West Ham are confirmed as the anchor tenants for the Olympic Stadium. They will pay £15 million towards the conversion of the stadium, pay £2 million a year in rent and will move to the stadium in 2016.
- 8 May 2013: Winston Reid is named Hammer of the Year for the 2012–13 season.
- 12 May 2013: West Ham lose their last away game of the season 2–0 to Everton. West Ham finish with only 11 away goals, the lowest in the league.
- 19 May 2013: On the final day of the 2012–13 Premier League season, West Ham beat already relegated Reading 4–2 with a hat-trick scored by Kevin Nolan. They end the season in tenth place with 46 points collected from 38 matches.
- 24 May 2013: West Ham achieve the highest average home attendance in their 118-year history: 659,677 supporters attended home games, an average of 34,720 per game.

== Final League table ==
| Pos | Team | Pld | W | D | L | GF | GA | GD | Pts | Qualification or relegation |
|---|---|---|---|---|---|---|---|---|---|---|
| 8 | West Bromwich Albion | 38 | 14 | 7 | 17 | 53 | 57 | −4 | 49 | |
| 9 | Swansea City | 38 | 11 | 13 | 14 | 47 | 51 | −4 | 46 | Qualification for the Europa League third qualifying round (Note: Swansea City qualified for the Europa League third qualifying round as the 2012–13 Football League Cup winners.) |
| 10 | West Ham United | 38 | 12 | 10 | 16 | 45 | 53 | −8 | 46 | |
| 11 | Norwich City | 38 | 10 | 14 | 14 | 41 | 58 | −17 | 44 | |
| 12 | Fulham | 38 | 11 | 10 | 17 | 50 | 60 | −10 | 43 | |

Source: Barclays Premier League
Rules for classification: 1) Points; 2) Goal difference; 3) Goals scored; 4) Play-offs (only if needed to decide champion, teams for relegation or teams for UEFA competitions).

== Squad ==
Note: Flags indicate national team as defined under FIFA eligibility rules; some limited exceptions apply. Players may hold more than one non-FIFA nationality.

| No. | Pos. | Nation | Player |
|---|---|---|---|
| 2 | DF | NZL | Winston Reid |
| 3 | DF | NIR | George McCartney |
| 4 | MF | ENG | Kevin Nolan (captain) |
| 5 | DF | ENG | James Tomkins |
| 7 | MF | ENG | Matt Jarvis |
| 8 | FW | ENG | Andy Carroll (on loan from Liverpool) |
| 9 | FW | ENG | Carlton Cole |
| 10 | MF | WAL | Jack Collison |
| 11 | FW | MLI | Modibo Maïga |
| 12 | FW | POR | Ricardo Vaz Te |
| 13 | GK | IRL | Stephen Henderson |
| 14 | MF | ENG | Matthew Taylor |
| 16 | MF | ENG | Mark Noble (vice-captain) |

| No. | Pos. | Nation | Player |
|---|---|---|---|
| 17 | DF | IRL | Joey O'Brien |
| 18 | DF | AUT | Emmanuel Pogatetz |
| 19 | DF | WAL | James Collins |
| 20 | DF | CIV | Guy Demel |
| 21 | MF | SEN | Mohamed Diamé |
| 22 | GK | FIN | Jussi Jääskeläinen |
| 26 | MF | ENG | Joe Cole |
| 27 | DF | ENG | Jordan Spence |
| 29 | FW | MAR | Marouane Chamakh |
| 30 | GK | SUI | Raphael Spiegel |
| 31 | FW | BRA | Wellington Paulista |
| 32 | MF | ENG | Gary O'Neil |
| 33 | DF | ENG | Danny Potts |

=== Out on loan ===
Note: Flags indicate national team as defined under FIFA eligibility rules; some limited exceptions apply. Players may hold more than one non-FIFA nationality.

| No. | Pos. | Nation | Player |
|---|---|---|---|
| 23 | MF | FRA | Alou Diarra (at Rennes) |
| 36 | MF | ENG | Ravel Morrison (at Birmingham City) |

== Results ==
=== Pre-season ===
| 7 July 2012 | Austria Wien | 3–1 | West Ham United | Vienna, Austria |
| 15:00 BST | Linz 24'; Vršič 27'; Jun 75' | Report | Baldock 4' | Stadium: Franz Horr Stadium; Attendance: 7,150 |

| 10 July 2012 | Boreham Wood | 1–1 | West Ham United | Borehamwood |
| 19:30 BST | Effiong 51' | Report | Baldock 27' | Stadium: Meadow Park |

| 14 July 2012 | Southend United | 0–3 | West Ham United | Southend |
| 15:00 BST | | Report | Maynard 22'; Spence 34'; Baldock 64' | Stadium: Roots Hall; Attendance: 7,135 |

| 17 July 2012 | Oxford United | 1–0 | West Ham United | Oxford |
| 19:45 BST | Smalley 36' | Report | | Stadium: Kassam Stadium; Attendance: 4,780 |

| 21 July 2012 | Colchester United | 1–2 | West Ham United | Colchester |
| 15:00 BST | Wordsworth 39' | Report | Maynard 16'; Noble 32' (pen.) | Stadium: Weston Homes Community Stadium; Attendance: 7,985 |

| 25 July 2012 | FC Rot-Weiß Erfurt | 0–3 | West Ham United | Erfurt, Germany |
| 18:00 BST | | Report | Ofosu-Ayeh 47' (o.g.); Vaz Tê 63', 77' | Stadium: Steigerwaldstadion; Attendance: 6,750 |

| 27 July 2012 | Dynamo Dresden | 3–0 | West Ham United | Dresden, Germany |
| 18:30 BST | Koch 21'; Pepić 51'; Köz 82' | | | Stadium: Glücksgas Stadium |

| 29 July 2012 | Energie Cottbus | 2–2 | West Ham United | Cottbus, Germany |
| 13:30 BST | Adlung 8', 42' | Report | Kazim-Richards 77'; Baldock 79' | Stadium: Stadion der Freundschaft |

| 4 August 2012 | Ipswich Town | 3–1 | West Ham United | Ipswich |
| 15:00 BST | Chopra 15' (pen.); Chambers 19'; Scotland 83' | Report | Taylor 73' | Stadium: Portman Road; Attendance: 7,682 |

| 10 August 2012 | Braga | 1–1 | West Ham United | Braga, Portugal |
| 20:30 | Lima 34' (pen.) | Report | Reid 89' | Stadium: Braga Municipal Stadium |

=== Premier League ===
==== Results by matchday ====
| Matchday | 1 | 2 | 3 | 4 | 5 | 6 | 7 | 8 | 9 | 10 | 11 | 12 | 13 | 14 | 15 | 16 | 17 | 18 | 19 | 20 | 21 | 22 | 23 | 24 | 25 | 26 | 27 | 28 | 29 | 30 | 31 | 32 | 33 | 34 | 35 | 36 | 37 | 38 |
|---|---|---|---|---|---|---|---|---|---|---|---|---|---|---|---|---|---|---|---|---|---|---|---|---|---|---|---|---|---|---|---|---|---|---|---|---|---|---|
| Ground | H | A | H | A | H | A | H | H | A | H | A | H | A | A | H | H | A | H | A | A | H | A | H | A | H | A | H | A | H | A | H | A | A | H | A | H | A | H |
| Result | W | L | W | D | D | W | L | W | L | D | W | D | L | L | W | L | D | L | L | L | W | L | D | L | W | L | L | W | D | L | W | D | D | W | L | D | L | W |
| Position | 8 | 11 | 7 | 8 | 9 | 7 | 8 | 7 | 9 | 9 | 6 | 7 | 8 | 10 | 8 | 11 | 11 | 12 | 12 | 12 | 11 | 11 | 12 | 13 | 11 | 11 | 14 | 12 | 10 | 12 | 11 | 11 | 11 | 10 | 10 | 10 | 10 | 10 |

Source: worldfootball.net
A = Away; H = Home; W = Win; D = Draw; L = Loss

| 18 August 2012 1 | West Ham United | 1–0 | Aston Villa | London |
| 15:00 BST | Nolan 40' | Report | | Stadium: Boleyn Ground; Attendance: 34,172; Referee: Mike Dean |

| 25 August 2012 2 | Swansea City | 3–0 | West Ham United | Swansea |
| 12:45 BST | Rangel 20', (yellow card) 30'; Michu 29'; Graham 64'; Flores (yellow card) 68' | Report | Cole (yellow card) 38'; Nolan (yellow card) 53'; Collins (yellow card) 58'; Reid (yellow card) 83' | Stadium: Liberty Stadium; Attendance: 20,424; Referee: Martin Atkinson |

| 1 September 2012 3 | West Ham United | 3–0 | Fulham | London |
| 12:45 BST | Nolan 1'; Reid 29'; Taylor 41' | Report | | Stadium: Boleyn Ground; Attendance: 33,458; Referee: Anthony Taylor |

| 15 September 2012 4 | Norwich City | 0–0 | West Ham United | Norwich |
| 12:45 BST | | Report | Collins (yellow card) 41' | Stadium: Carrow Road; Attendance: 26,806; Referee: Chris Foy |

| 22 September 2012 5 | West Ham United | 1–1 | Sunderland | London |
| 15:00 BST | Nolan 90+3' | Report | Fletcher 9' | Stadium: Boleyn Ground; Attendance: 33,052; Referee: Lee Mason |

| 1 October 2012 6 | Queens Park Rangers | 1–2 | West Ham United | London |
| 20:00 BST | Taarabt 57' | Report | Jarvis 3'; Vaz Tê 36' | Stadium: Loftus Road; Attendance: 17,363; Referee: Mark Clattenburg |

| 6 October 2012 7 | West Ham United | 1–3 | Arsenal | London |
| 17:30 BST | Diamé 21', (yellow card) 21'; Reid (yellow card) 36'; Taylor (yellow card) 85' | Report | 41' Giroud; (yellow card) 45+1' Gervinho; 77', (yellow card) 77' Walcott; 83' Cazorla | Stadium: Boleyn Ground; Attendance: 34,974; Referee: Phil Dowd |

| 20 October 2012 8 | West Ham United | 4–1 | Southampton | London |
| 15:00 BST | Noble 46', 72' (pen.); Nolan 48'; Maïga 87' | Report | Lallana 63' | Stadium: Boleyn Ground; Attendance: 34,925; Referee: Neil Swarbrick |

| 27 October 2012 9 | Wigan Athletic | 2–1 | West Ham United | Wigan |
| 15:00 BST | Ramis 8'; McArthur 47' | Report | Tomkins 90+2' | Stadium: DW Stadium; Attendance: 19,090; Referee: Jonathan Moss |

| 3 November 2012 10 | West Ham United | 0–0 | Manchester City | London |
| 17:30 UTC | | Report | | Stadium: Boleyn Ground; Attendance: 35,005; Referee: Howard Webb |

| 11 November 2012 11 | Newcastle United | 0–1 | West Ham United | Newcastle |
| 15:00 UTC | Ben Arfa (yellow card) 76' | Report | Nolan 38'; Noble (yellow card) 45'; O'Brien (yellow card) 61' | Stadium: St James' Park; Attendance: 51,855; Referee: Mike Dean |

| 19 November 2012 12 | West Ham United | 1–1 | Stoke City | London |
| 20:00 UTC | O'Brien 48' | Report | Walters 13' | Stadium: Boleyn Ground; Attendance: 35,005; Referee: Chris Foy |

| 25 November 2012 13 | Tottenham Hotspur | 3–1 | West Ham United | London |
| 16:00 UTC | Defoe (yellow card) 33', (goal) 44', 64'; Bale 58' | Report | O'Brien (yellow card) 7'; Noble (yellow card) 29'; Carroll 82' | Stadium: White Hart Lane; Attendance: 36,043; Referee: Andre Marriner |

| 28 November 2012 14 | Manchester United | 1–0 | West Ham United | Manchester |
| 20:00 UTC | Van Persie 1'; Carrick (yellow card) 78' | Report | Nolan (yellow card) 7' | Stadium: Old Trafford; Attendance: 75,572; Referee: Mike Jones |

| 1 December 2012 15 | West Ham United | 3–1 | Chelsea | London |
| 12:45 UTC | C. Cole 63'; Diamé 86'; Maïga 90' | Report | Mata 13' | Stadium: Boleyn Ground; Attendance: 35,005; Referee: Martin Atkinson |

| 9 December 2012 16 | West Ham United | 2–3 | Liverpool | London |
| 16:00 UTC | Noble 36' (pen.); Gerrard 43' (o.g.) | Report | Johnson 11'; Cole 76'; Collins 79' (o.g.) | Stadium: Boleyn Ground; Attendance: 35,005; Referee: Lee Probert |

| 16 December 2012 17 | West Bromwich Albion | 0–0 | West Ham United | West Bromwich |
| 16:00 UTC | | Report | | Stadium: The Hawthorns; Attendance: 24,186; Referee: Phil Dowd |

| 22 December 2012 18 | West Ham United | 1–2 | Everton | London |
| 15:00 UTC | C. Cole 14', (red card) 67' | Report | Anichebe 64'; Pienaar 73'; Gibson (red card) 90+2' | Stadium: Boleyn Ground; Attendance: 35,005; Referee: Anthony Taylor |

| 29 December 2012 19 | Reading | 1–0 | West Ham United | Reading |
| 15:00 UTC | Pogrebnyak 5' | Report | | Stadium: Madejski Stadium; Attendance: 24,183; Referee: Michael Oliver |

| 1 January 2013 20 | West Ham United | 2–1 | Norwich City | London |
| 15:00 UTC | Noble 3' (pen.); O'Brien 26' | Report | Martin 90' | Stadium: Boleyn Ground; Attendance: 35,005; Referee: Mark Clattenburg |

| 12 January 2013 21 | Sunderland | 3–0 | West Ham United | Sunderland |
| 15:00 UTC | Larsson 12'; Johnson 47'; McClean 74' | Report | | Stadium: Stadium of Light; Attendance: 39,918; Referee: Neil Swarbrick |

| 19 January 2013 22 | West Ham United | 1–1 | Queens Park Rangers | London |
| 15:00 UTC | J. Cole 68' | Report | Rémy 14' | Stadium: Boleyn Ground; Attendance: 34,962; Referee: Howard Webb |

| 23 January 2013 23 | Arsenal | 5–1 | West Ham United | London |
| 19:45 UTC | Podolski 22'; Giroud 44', 57'; Carzola 53'; Walcott 54' | Report | Collison 18' | Stadium: Emirates Stadium; Attendance: 60,081; Referee: Andre Marriner |

| 30 January 2013 24 | Fulham | 3–1 | West Ham United | London |
| 20:00 UTC | Berbatov 10'; Rodallega 49'; J O'Brien 90' (o.g.) | Report | Nolan 48' | Stadium: Craven Cottage; Attendance: 24,791; Referee: Chris Foy |

| 2 February 2013 25 | West Ham United | 1–0 | Swansea City | London |
| 15:00 UTC | Carroll 77' | Report | | Stadium: Boleyn Ground; Attendance: 34,962; Referee: Lee Probert |

| 10 February 2013 26 | Aston Villa | 2–1 | West Ham United | Birmingham |
| 13:30 UTC | Benteke 74' (pen.); N'Zogbia 78' | Report | Westwood 87' (o.g.) | Stadium: Villa Park; Attendance: 30,503; Referee: Mark Clattenburg |

| 25 February 2013 27 | West Ham United | 2–3 | Tottenham Hotspur | London |
| 20:00 UTC | Carroll 25' (pen.); J. Cole 58' | Report | Bale 13', 90'; Sigurðsson 76' | Stadium: Boleyn Ground; Attendance: 35,005; Referee: Howard Webb |

| 2 March 2013 28 | Stoke City | 0–1 | West Ham United | Stoke |
| 15:00 UTC | | Report | Collison 45' | Stadium: Britannia Stadium; Attendance: 26,250; Referee: Jonathan Moss |

| 17 March 2013 29 | Chelsea | 2–0 | West Ham United | London |
| 16:00 UTC | Lampard 19'; Hazard 50' | Report | | Stadium: Stamford Bridge; Attendance: 41,639; Referee: Michael Oliver |

| 30 March 2013 30 | West Ham United | 3–1 | West Bromwich Albion | London |
| 15:00 UTC | Carroll 16', 80'; O'Neil 28' | Report | Dorrans 88' (pen.) | Stadium: Boleyn Ground; Attendance: 34,966; Referee: Andre Marriner |

| 7 April 2013 31 | Liverpool | 0–0 | West Ham United | Liverpool |
| 13:30 BST | | Report | | Stadium: Anfield; Attendance: 45,007; Referee: Anthony Taylor |

| 13 April 2013 32 | Southampton | 1–1 | West Ham United | Southampton |
| 15:00 BST | Schneiderlin (yellow card) 5'; Fox (yellow card) 25'; Ramírez 59' | Report | Carroll (yellow card) 42', (goal) 66'; Pogatetz (yellow card) 73'; Vaz Tê (yellow card) 83' | Stadium: St Mary's; Attendance: 31,984; Referee: Mike Dean |

| 17 April 2013 33 | West Ham United | 2–2 | Manchester United | London |
| 19:45 BST | Vaz Tê 16'; Diamé 55' | Report | Valencia 31'; Van Persie 77' | Stadium: Boleyn Ground; Attendance: 34,692; Referee: Lee Probert |

| 20 April 2013 34 | West Ham United | 2–0 | Wigan Athletic | London |
| 15:00 BST | Jarvis 21'; Nolan 80' | Report | | Stadium: Boleyn Ground; Attendance: 34,544; Referee: Neil Swarbrick |

| 27 April 2013 35 | Manchester City | 2–1 | West Ham United | Manchester |
| 12:45 BST | Agüero 27'; Y. Touré 83' | Report | Carroll 90' | Stadium: Etihad Stadium; Attendance: 47,189; Referee: Howard Webb |

| 4 May 2013 36 | West Ham United | 0–0 | Newcastle United | London |
| 15:00 BST | | Report | | Stadium: Boleyn Ground; Attendance: 34,962; Referee: Phil Dowd |

| 12 May 2013 37 | Everton | 2–0 | West Ham United | Liverpool |
| 15:00 BST | Mirallas 6', 60' | Report | | Stadium: Goodison Park; Attendance: 39,475; Referee: Phil Dowd |

| 19 May 2013 38 | West Ham United | 4–2 | Reading | London |
| 16:00 BST | Nolan 23', 79', 87'; Vaz Tê 34' | Report | McCleary 53'; Le Fondre 55' | Stadium: Boleyn Ground; Attendance: 34,973; Referee: Mike Dean |

=== FA Cup ===
| 5 January 2013 R3 | West Ham United | 2–2 | Manchester United | London |
| 17:30 | Collins 27', 59' | Report | Cleverley 23'; Van Persie 90' | Stadium: Boleyn Ground; Attendance: 32,922; Referee: Martin Atkinson |

| 16 January 2013 R3 Replay | Manchester United | 1–0 | West Ham United | Manchester |
| 20:05 | Rooney 9' | Report | | Stadium: Old Trafford; Attendance: 71,081; Referee: Phil Dowd |

=== Football League Cup ===
| 28 August 2012 R2 | West Ham United | 2–0 | Crewe Alexandra | London |
| 19:45 | Maynard 34'; Maïga 55' | Report | | Stadium: Upton Park; Attendance: 18,053; Referee: Fred Graham |

| 25 September 2012 R3 | West Ham United | 1–4 | Wigan Athletic | London |
| 19:45 | Maïga 7' | Report | Boselli 14', 41'; Ramis 38'; Gómez 84' (pen.) | Stadium: Upton Park; Attendance: 25,934; Referee: Craig Pawson |

== Statistics ==
=== Overview ===
| Competition | Record | | | | | | | |
| Competition | P | W | D | L | GF | GA | GD | Win % |
|---|---|---|---|---|---|---|---|---|
| Premier League | 38 | 12 | 10 | 16 | 45 | 53 | −8 | 31.58 |
| FA Cup | 2 | 0 | 1 | 1 | 2 | 3 | −1 | 0.00 |
| League Cup | 2 | 1 | 0 | 1 | 3 | 4 | −1 | 50.00 |
| Total | 42 | 13 | 11 | 18 | 50 | 60 | −10 | 30.95 |

=== Goalscorers ===
| Rank | Pos | No. | Nat | Name | Premier League | FA Cup | League Cup | Total |
|---|---|---|---|---|---|---|---|---|
| 1 | MF | 4 | (England) | Kevin Nolan | 10 | 0 | 0 | 10 |
| 2 | ST | 8 | (England) | Andy Carroll | 7 | 0 | 0 | 7 |
| 3 | ST | 11 | (Mali) | Modibo Maïga | 2 | 0 | 2 | 4 |
| 3 | MF | 16 | (England) | Mark Noble | 4 | 0 | 0 | 4 |
| 5 | ST | 12 | (Portugal) | Ricardo Vaz Tê | 3 | 0 | 0 | 3 |
| 5 | MF | 21 | (Senegal) | Mohamed Diamé | 3 | 0 | 0 | 3 |
| 7 | MF | 7 | (England) | Matt Jarvis | 2 | 0 | 0 | 2 |
| 7 | ST | 9 | (England) | Carlton Cole | 2 | 0 | 0 | 2 |
| 7 | MF | 10 | (Wales) | Jack Collison | 2 | 0 | 0 | 2 |
| 7 | DF | 17 | (Republic of Ireland) | Joey O'Brien | 2 | 0 | 0 | 2 |
| 7 | DF | 19 | (Wales) | James Collins | 0 | 2 | 0 | 2 |
| 7 | MF | 26 | (England) | Joe Cole | 2 | 0 | 0 | 2 |
| 7 | Own goals | | | | 2 | 0 | 0 | 2 |
| 14 | DF | 2 | (New Zealand) | Winston Reid | 1 | 0 | 0 | 1 |
| 14 | DF | 5 | (England) | James Tomkins | 1 | 0 | 0 | 1 |
| 14 | ST | 8 | (England) | Nicky Maynard | 0 | 0 | 1 | 1 |
| 14 | MF | 14 | (England) | Matthew Taylor | 1 | 0 | 0 | 1 |
| 14 | MF | 32 | (England) | Gary O'Neil | 1 | 0 | 0 | 1 |
| Totals | | | | | 45 | 2 | 3 | 50 |

==== League position by matchday ====
| Round | 1 | 2 | 3 | 4 | 5 | 6 | 7 | 8 | 9 | 10 | 11 | 12 | 13 | 14 | 15 | 16 | 17 | 18 | 19 | 20 | 21 | 22 | 23 | 24 | 25 | 26 | 27 | 28 | 29 | 30 | 31 | 32 | 33 | 34 | 35 | 36 | 37 | 38 |
|---|---|---|---|---|---|---|---|---|---|---|---|---|---|---|---|---|---|---|---|---|---|---|---|---|---|---|---|---|---|---|---|---|---|---|---|---|---|---|
| Ground | H | A | H | A | H | A | H | H | A | H | A | H | A | A | H | H | A | H | A | H | A | H | A | A | H | A | H | A | A | H | A | A | H | H | A | H | A | H |
| Result | W | L | W | D | D | W | L | W | L | D | W | D | L | L | W | L | D | L | L | W | L | D | L | L | W | L | L | W | L | W | D | D | D | W | L | D | L | W |
| Position | 8 | 10 | 7 | 8 | 9 | 7 | 8 | 7 | 9 | 9 | 6 | 7 | 8 | 10 | 8 | 11 | 11 | 12 | 12 | 11 | 11 | 12 | 12 | 13 | 11 | 11 | 14 | 12 | 14 | 11 | 12 | 12 | 12 | 10 | 10 | 10 | 10 | 10 |

A = Away; H = Home; W = Win; D = Draw; L = Loss

=== Appearances and goals ===
| No. | Pos | Nat | Player | Total | | Premier League | | FA Cup | | League Cup | |
| No. | Pos | Nat | Player | Apps | Goals | Apps | Goals | Apps | Goals | Apps | Goals |
Goalkeepers
| 13 | GK | (Republic of Ireland) IRL | Stephen Henderson | 2 | 0 | 0 | 0 | 0 | 0 | 2 | 0 |
| 22 | GK | (Finland) FIN | Jussi Jääskeläinen | 40 | 0 | 38 | 0 | 2 | 0 | 0 | 0 |
Defenders
| 2 | DF | (New Zealand) NZL | Winston Reid | 37 | 1 | 36 | 1 | 1 | 0 | 0 | 0 |
| 3 | DF | (Northern Ireland) NIR | George McCartney | 13 | 0 | 9+3 | 0 | 0 | 0 | 1 | 0 |
| 5 | DF | (England) ENG | James Tomkins | 29 | 1 | 18+8 | 1 | 2 | 0 | 1 | 0 |
| 17 | DF | (Republic of Ireland) IRL | Joey O'Brien | 34 | 2 | 32+1 | 2 | 0 | 0 | 1 | 0 |
| 18 | DF | (Austria) AUT | Emmanuel Pogatetz | 6 | 0 | 1+5 | 0 | 0 | 0 | 0 | 0 |
| 19 | DF | (Wales) WAL | James Collins | 30 | 2 | 29 | 0 | 1 | 2 | 0 | 0 |
| 20 | DF | (Ivory Coast) CIV | Guy Demel | 32 | 0 | 28+3 | 0 | 1 | 0 | 0 | 0 |
| 27 | DF | (England) ENG | Jordan Spence | 7 | 0 | 0+4 | 0 | 1 | 0 | 2 | 0 |
| 33 | DF | (England) ENG | Danny Potts | 6 | 0 | 1+1 | 0 | 2 | 0 | 2 | 0 |
Midfielders
| 4 | MF | (England) ENG | Kevin Nolan | 38 | 10 | 35 | 10 | 1+1 | 0 | 1 | 0 |
| 7 | MF | (England) ENG | Matt Jarvis | 34 | 2 | 29+3 | 2 | 0+1 | 0 | 1 | 0 |
| 10 | MF | (Wales) WAL | Jack Collison | 19 | 2 | 5+12 | 2 | 1+1 | 0 | 0 | 0 |
| 14 | MF | (England) ENG | Matthew Taylor | 32 | 1 | 14+14 | 1 | 1+1 | 0 | 1+1 | 0 |
| 15 | MF | (Israel) ISR | Yossi Benayoun | 6 | 0 | 4+2 | 0 | 0 | 0 | 0 | 0 |
| 16 | MF | (England) ENG | Mark Noble | 30 | 4 | 25+3 | 4 | 0+1 | 0 | 1 | 0 |
| 21 | MF | (Senegal) SEN | Mohamed Diamé | 34 | 3 | 31+2 | 3 | 1 | 0 | 0 | 0 |
| 23 | MF | (France) FRA | Alou Diarra | 6 | 0 | 1+2 | 0 | 2 | 0 | 1 | 0 |
| 26 | MF | (England) ENG | Joe Cole | 12 | 2 | 7+4 | 2 | 1 | 0 | 0 | 0 |
| 32 | MF | (England) ENG | Gary O'Neil | 27 | 1 | 17+7 | 1 | 1 | 0 | 2 | 0 |
| 40 | MF | (England) ENG | Matthias Fanimo | 2 | 0 | 0 | 0 | 0 | 0 | 0+2 | 0 |
| 42 | MF | (England) ENG | George Moncur | 1 | 0 | 0 | 0 | 0 | 0 | 0+1 | 0 |
Forwards
| 8 | FW | (England) ENG | Andy Carroll | 24 | 7 | 22+2 | 7 | 0 | 0 | 0 | 0 |
| 8 | FW | (England) ENG | Nicky Maynard | 1 | 1 | 0 | 0 | 0 | 0 | 1 | 1 |
| 9 | FW | (England) ENG | Carlton Cole | 29 | 2 | 14+13 | 2 | 2 | 0 | 0 | 0 |
| 11 | FW | (Mali) MLI | Modibo Maiga | 19 | 4 | 2+15 | 2 | 0 | 0 | 2 | 2 |
| 12 | FW | (Portugal) POR | Ricardo Vaz Te | 28 | 3 | 18+6 | 3 | 2 | 0 | 2 | 0 |
| 29 | FW | (Morocco) MAR | Marouane Chamakh | 3 | 0 | 2+1 | 0 | 0 | 0 | 0 | 0 |
| 39 | FW | (Australia) AUS | Dylan Tombides | 1 | 0 | 0 | 0 | 0 | 0 | 0+1 | 0 |
| 46 | FW | (England) ENG | Robert Hall | 3 | 0 | 0+1 | 0 | 0 | 0 | 1+1 | 0 |
| 47 | FW | (England) ENG | Elliott Lee | 1 | 0 | 0 | 0 | 0+1 | 0 | 0 | 0 |

== Transfers ==
=== Summer ===
==== In ====
| # | Pos | Player | From | Fee | Date | Notes |
|---|---|---|---|---|---|---|
| 13 | GK | (Republic of Ireland) Stephen Henderson | (England) Portsmouth | Undisclosed | 21 May 2012 | |
| 22 | GK | (Finland) Jussi Jääskeläinen | (England) Bolton Wanderers | Free | 1 July 2012 | |
| 21 | MF | (Senegal) Mohamed Diamé | (England) Wigan Athletic | Free | 1 July 2012 | |
| 3 | DF | (Northern Ireland) George McCartney | (England) Sunderland | Free | 1 July 2012 | |
| 11 | FW | (Mali) Modibo Maïga | (France) Sochaux | Undisclosed | 18 July 2012 | |
| 30 | GK | (Switzerland) Raphael Spiegel | (Switzerland) Grasshoppers | Undisclosed | 23 July 2012 | |
| 19 | DF | (Wales) James Collins | (England) Aston Villa | Undisclosed | 1 August 2012 | |
| 23 | MF | (France) Alou Diarra | (France) Marseille | Undisclosed | 10 August 2012 | |
| 7 | MF | (England) Matt Jarvis | (England) Wolverhampton Wanderers | Undisclosed | 24 August 2012 | |
| 8 | FW | (England) Andy Carroll | (England) Liverpool | Season-long loan | 30 August 2012 | |
| 15 | MF | (Israel) Yossi Benayoun | (England) Chelsea | Season-long loan | 31 August 2012 | |

==== Out ====
| Pos | Player | To | Fee | Date | Notes |
|---|---|---|---|---|---|
| GK | (Hungary) Péter Kurucz | (Hungary) BFC Siofok | Free | 8 May 2012 | |
| FW | (Norway) John Carew | Free Agent | Free | 23 May 2012 | |
| DF | (Senegal) Abdoulaye Faye | (England) Hull City | Free | 23 May 2012 | |
| DF | (France) Julien Faubert | (Turkey) Elazığspor | Free | 23 May 2012 | |
| MF | (Senegal) Papa Bouba Diop | (England) Birmingham City | Free | 23 May 2012 | |
| MF | (England) Frank Nouble | (England) Wolverhampton Wanderers | Free | 23 May 2012 | |
| MF | (England) Olly Lee | (England) Barnet | Free | 23 May 2012 | |
| GK | (England) Robert Green | (England) Queens Park Rangers | Free | 1 July 2012 | |
| FW | (England) Freddie Sears | (England) Colchester United | Free | 29 June 2012 | |
| GK | (Czech Republic) Marek Štěch | (England) Yeovil Town | Free | 1 July 2012 | |
| MF | (England) Ravel Morrison | (England) Birmingham City | Season-long loan | 6 August 2012 | |
| MF | (Colombia) Cristian Montaño | (England) Oldham Athletic | Undisclosed | 17 August 2012 | |
| FW | (England) Sam Baldock | (England) Bristol City | £1,000,000 | 21 August 2012 | |
| FW | (England) Nicky Maynard | (England) Cardiff City | £2,500,000 | 31 August 2012 | |
| GK | (Republic of Ireland) Stephen Henderson | (England) Ipswich Town | Five-month loan | 16 October 2012 | |
| DF | (England) Danny Potts | (England) Colchester United | One-month loan | 22 November 2012 | |
| FW | (England) Robert Hall | (England) Birmingham City | Fifty-day loan | 22 November 2012 | |
| MF | (England) Blair Turgott | (England) Bradford City | Loan | 22 November 2012 | |
| FW | (England) Paul McCallum | (England) AFC Wimbledon | One-month loan | 22 November 2012 | |

=== Winter ===
==== In ====
| # | Pos | Player | From | Fee | Date | Notes |
|---|---|---|---|---|---|---|
| 24 | FW | (Republic of Ireland) Sean Maguire | (Republic of Ireland) Waterford United | Undisclosed | 3 January 2013 | |
| 26 | MF | (England) Joe Cole | (England) Liverpool | Free | 4 January 2013 | |
| 15 | FW | (Morocco) Marouane Chamakh | (England) Arsenal | Loan | 4 January 2013 | |
| 31 | FW | (Brazil) Wellington Paulista | (Brazil) Cruzeiro | Loan | 11 January 2013 | |
| 18 | DF | (Austria) Emanuel Pogatetz | (Germany) Wolfsburg | Loan | 28 January 2013 | |
| | MF | (Sweden) Rinor Nushi | (Sweden) AFC United | Undisclosed | 31 January 2013 | |
| | GK | (Czech Republic) Vit Nemrava | (Czech Republic) Slovácko | Loan | 31 January 2013 | |

==== Out ====
| Pos | Player | To | Fee | Date | Notes |
|---|---|---|---|---|---|
| MF | (Israel) Yossi Benayoun | (England) Chelsea | Loan return | 3 January 2013 | |
| FW | (England) Rob Hall | (England) Birmingham City | Two month loan extension | 8 January 2013 | |
| MF | (England) Blair Turgott | (England) Bradford City | Two month loan extension | 8 January 2013 | |
| MF | (France) Alou Diarra | (France) Rennes | End of season loan | 31 January 2013 | |
| ST | (England) Paul McCallum | (England) Aldershot Town | One month loan | 8 March 2013 | |
| ST | (France) Frédéric Piquionne | (United States) Portland Timbers | Free | 1 March 2013 | |
| ST | (England) Robert Hall | (England) Bolton Wanderers | End of season loan | 28 March 2013 | |
