= Dylan Tombides =

Australian soccer player (1994–2014)

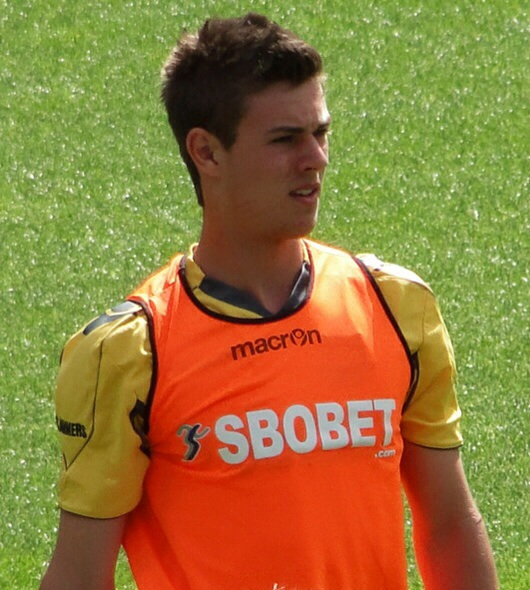
- Tombides warming up for West Ham United in 2011

Personal information
- Full name: Dylan James Tombides
- Date of birth: 8 March 1994
- Place of birth: Perth, Western Australia
- Date of death: 18 April 2014 (aged 20)
- Place of death: London, England
- Height: 1.86 m (6 ft 1 in)
- Position: Striker

Youth career
- Stirling Lions
- 2010–2012: West Ham United

Senior career*
Years	Team	Apps	(Gls)
2011–2014	West Ham United	0	(0)

International career
2011	Australia U17	5	(1)
2014	Australia U23	4	(0)
- * Club domestic league appearances and goals

Dylan James Tombides (8 March 1994 – 18 April 2014) was an Australian professional soccer player who played as a striker for West Ham United and the Australian under-17 and under-23 teams.

He partially grew up in Macau and played in Hong Kong before joining West Ham at the age of 15. After the 2011 FIFA U-17 World Cup, Tombides was diagnosed with testicular cancer, and in September 2012 during a period of recovery, he made his only professional appearance for West Ham. Following more treatment, he played at the 2013 AFC U-22 Championship, a feat that "defies medical logic".

Tombides died at the age of 20. Alongside Bobby Moore, he is one of two players to have their shirt numbers retired by West Ham.

== Club career ==
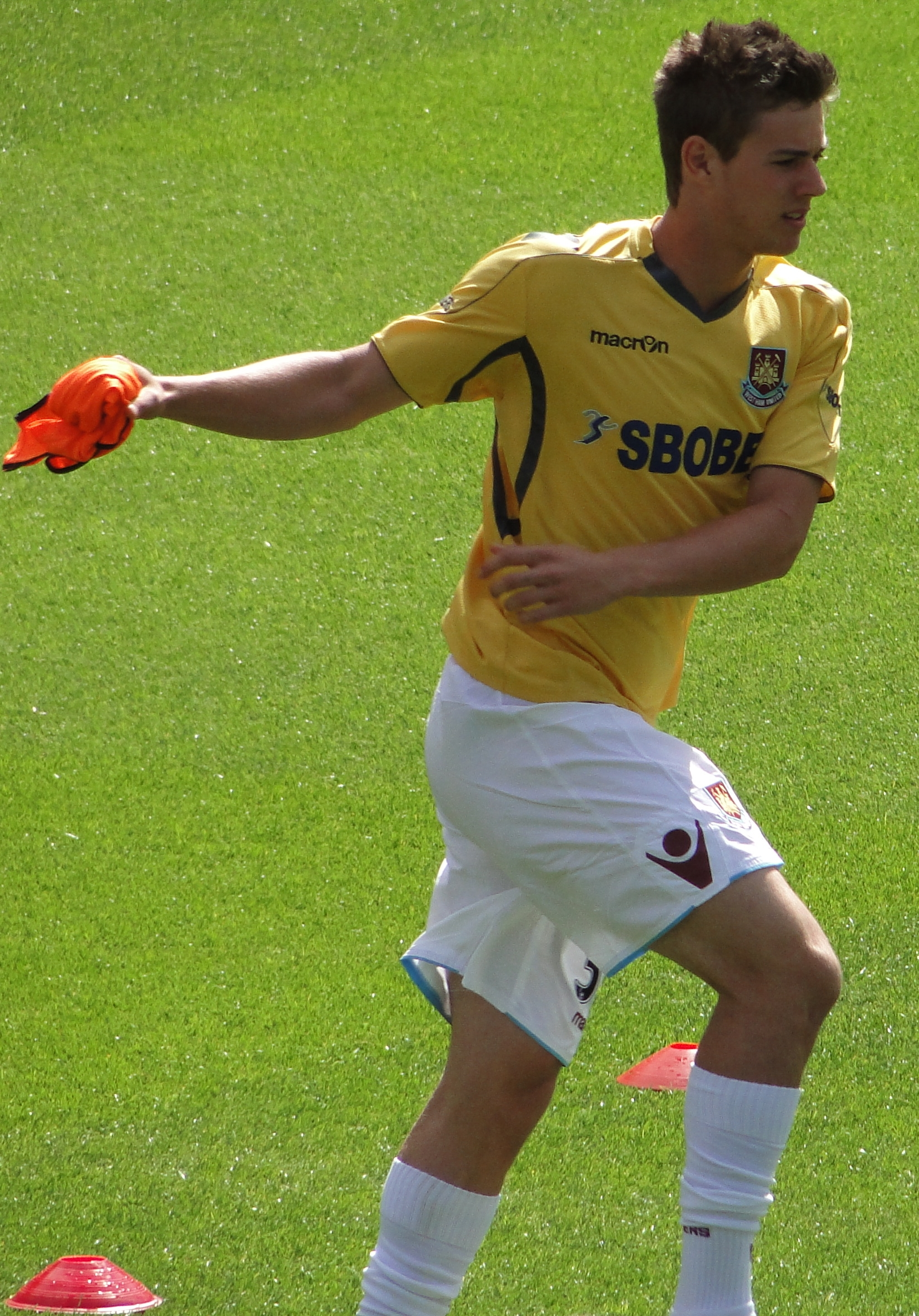
Tombides with West Ham in 2011

Born in Perth, Western Australia, having Hellenic ancestry from his father's side, Tombides lived in City Beach and played youth football with Stirling Lions before moving to Macau in 2007 aged 13. He played in nearby Hong Kong with the Brazilian Soccer School in Yau Ma Tei before joining West Ham United aged 15. He was an unused substitute in the Premier League game on 22 May 2011 against Sunderland, in which the already relegated Hammers concluded their season with a 3–0 loss at the Boleyn Ground.

On 25 September 2012, he made his only professional appearance for West Ham in a 4–1 home defeat by Wigan Athletic in the League Cup third round, coming on as an 84th-minute substitute for Gary O'Neil.

== International career ==
Tombides played in the Under-17 World Cup in Mexico in 2011, and played all four of Australia's matches as they reached the last 16 before elimination by Uzbekistan. In their opening game in Guadalajara, he scored the winner for a 2–1 victory over the Ivory Coast. He was considered by Australian fans and media to be a successor to Harry Kewell, but his coach Jan Versleijen downplayed the comparisons, saying that despite his talent it was too early to make such a judgement.

In January 2014, he represented Australia at the AFC U-22 Championship in Muscat, Oman. He played in games against the hosts, Iran, Japan, and Saudi Arabia as Australia reached the quarter-finals.

== Cancer diagnosis and death ==
In mid-2011, Tombides was aware of a lump, which his doctor told him was a benign cyst. After a random drugs test taken shortly after Australia's elimination from that year's Under-17 World Cup, it was confirmed that he had testicular cancer.

In June 2012, after treatment including the removal of his lymph nodes, Tombides was told he was back to full health and returned to training, and made his West Ham debut in September 2012. However, in December, he was back on chemotherapy, and had two stem cell transplants in eight weeks. By March, his cancer had metastasised to his liver.

Tombides played at the Asian under-22 championship in January 2014 after intense chemotherapy, but was told on return to England that his condition had become incurable. He died on the morning of 18 April 2014, with his family at his bedside.

The following day, before a game against Crystal Palace at the Boleyn Ground, his father and brother Taylor laid a shirt on the centre spot which carried Tombides' squad number 38 and his name. West Ham United announced that this number would be retired from use, an honour previously bestowed by the club only to Bobby Moore. Crystal Palace captain Mile Jedinak, also an Australian, did not celebrate when he scored the only goal in that match. Jedinak invited the Tombides family to Christmas that year.

Tombides was cremated on 5 May 2014 in a service at Padbury, to the north of Perth.

=== Legacy ===
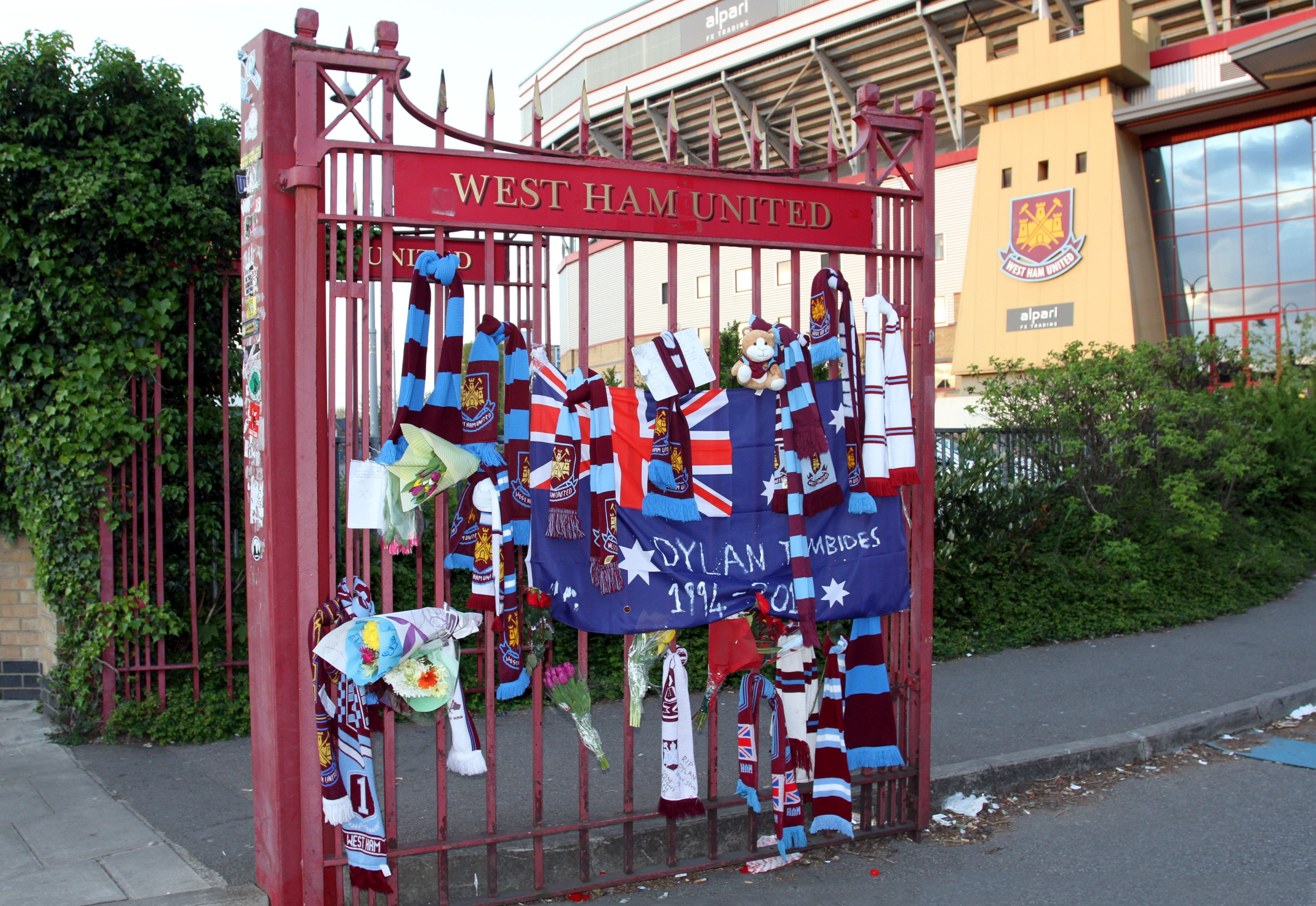
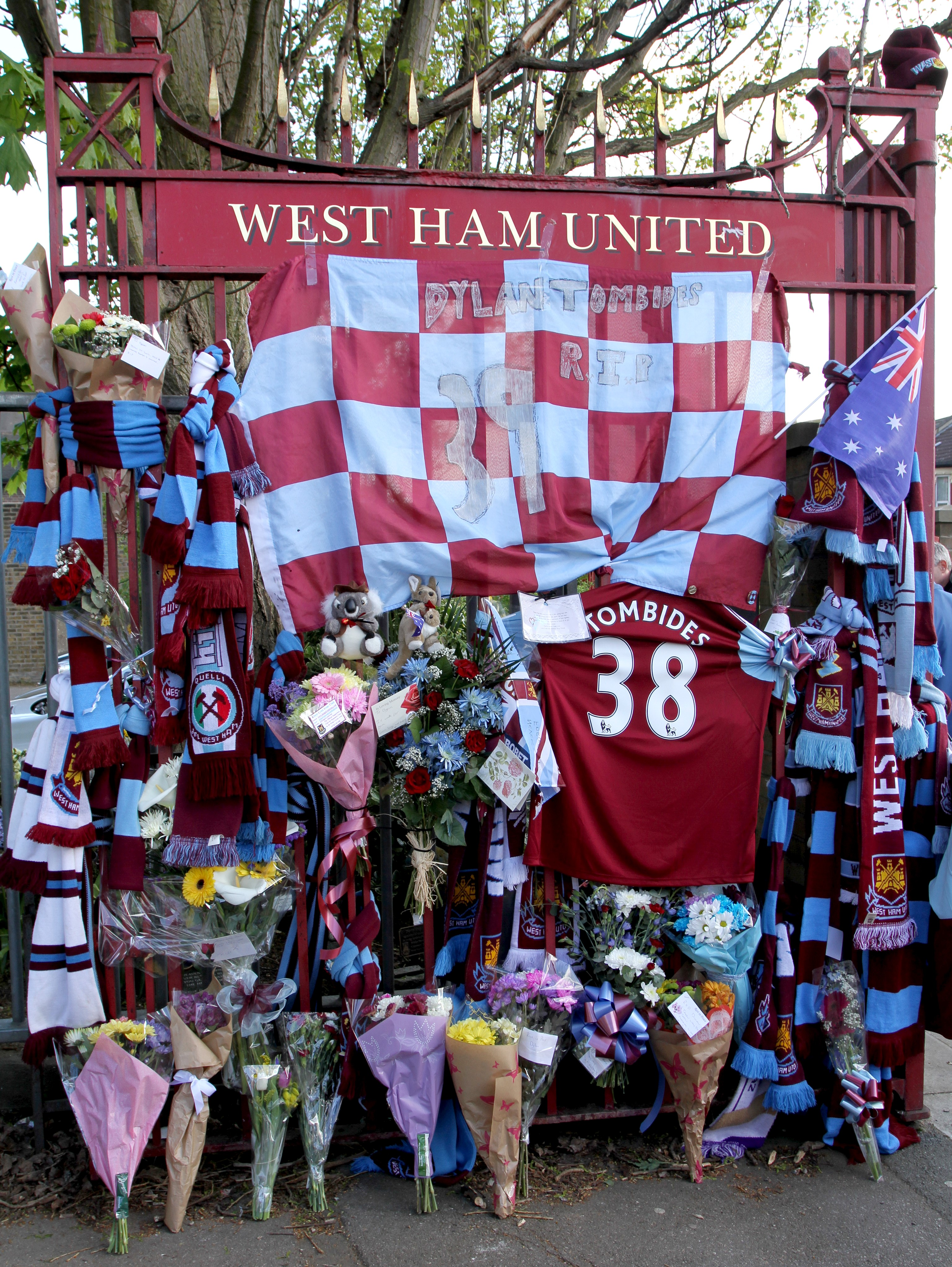

In February 2015, the "Dylan Tombides DT38" charitable foundation was launched with the aims of fundraising, raising awareness of testicular cancer and of the education of young people on the subject.

In September 2015, a statue was unveiled at the Perth Oval commemorating his life.

Among his former teammates, George Moncur had Tombides' name tattooed onto his arm, and Elliot Lee chose to wear the number 38 shirt at Luton Town and Wrexham in Tombides' honour.

On Easter Monday 2016, West Ham United staged a testimonial match for their captain Mark Noble between West Ham United and a West Ham "All-Star" Team consisting of former West Ham players. Noble donated the proceeds from the match to three charities, one of which was the DT38 Foundation. Towards the end of the game, Taylor Tombides came on as a substitute for the All-Star XI, wearing a number 38 shirt in honour of his late brother. He also scored the fifth goal for the All-Stars in a 6–5 win for West Ham.

== Career statistics ==
=== Club ===
Appearances and goals by club, season and competition
Club	Season	League			FA Cup		League Cup		Other		Total	
Club	Season	Division	Apps	Goals	Apps	Goals	Apps	Goals	Apps	Goals	Apps	Goals
West Ham United	2010–11	Premier League	0	0	0	0	0	0	—		0	0
West Ham United	2011–12	Championship	0	0	0	0	0	0	—		0	0
West Ham United	2012–13	Premier League	0	0	0	0	1	0	—		1	0
West Ham United	2013–14	Premier League	0	0	0	0	0	0	—		0	0
Career total			0	0	0	0	1	0	—		1	0
