= 2012 Football League Championship play-off final =

Association football match in London

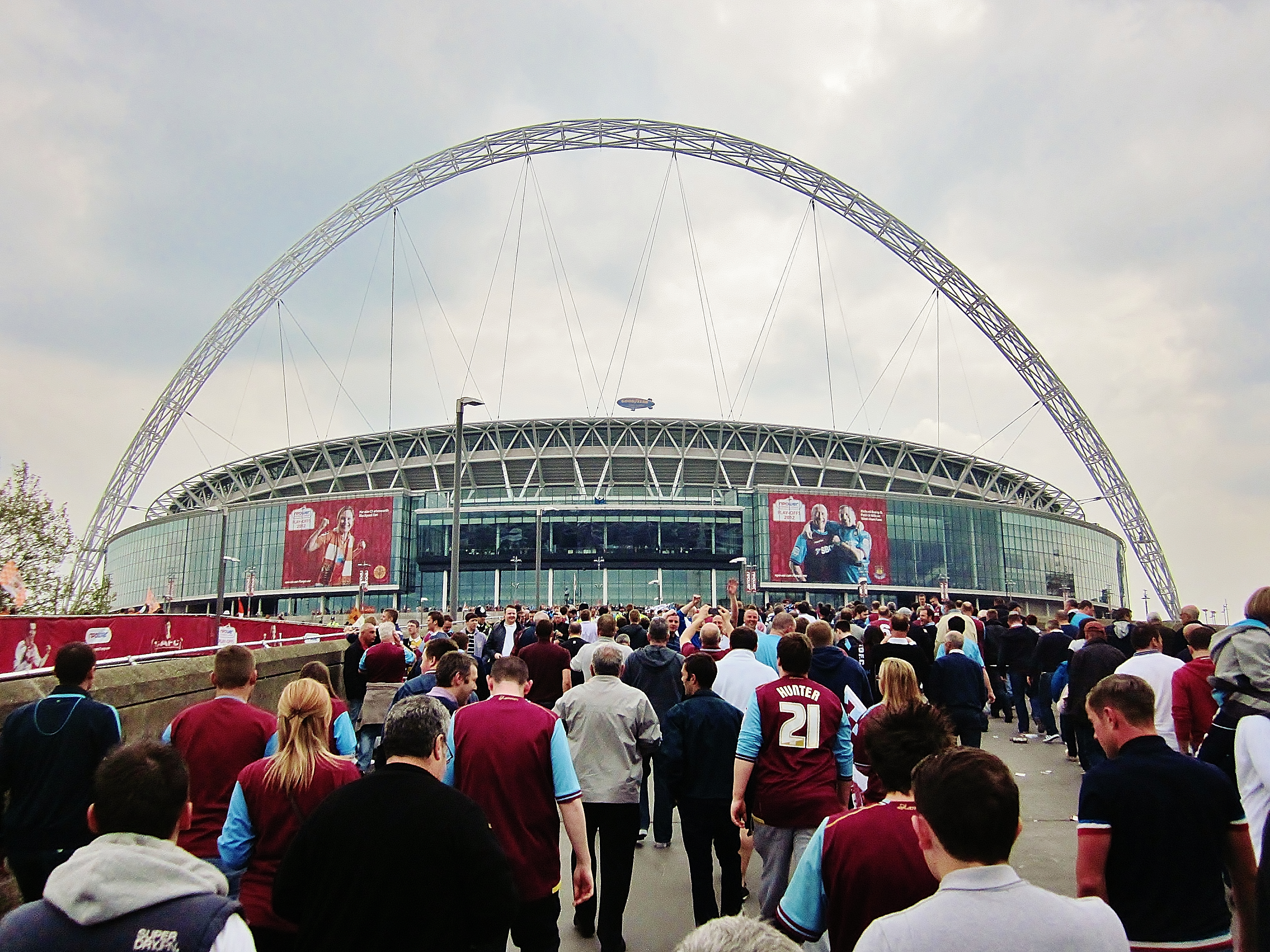
- Event: 2011–12 Football League Championship
Blackpool	West Ham United
1	2
- Date: 19 May 2012
- Venue: Wembley Stadium, London
- Man of the Match: James Tomkins (West Ham)
- Referee: Howard Webb
- Attendance: 78,523

The 2012 Football League Championship play-off final was an association football match which was played on 19 May 2012 at Wembley Stadium, London, between West Ham United and Blackpool. The match was to determine the third and final team to gain promotion from the Football League Championship, the second tier of English football, to the Premier League. The top two teams of the 2011–12 Football League Championship season gained automatic promotion to the Premier League, while the teams placed from third to sixth place in the table partook in play-off semi-finals; West Ham ended the season in third place while Blackpool had finished fifth. The winners of these semi-finals competed for the final place for the 2012–13 season in the Premier League.

The 2012 final, refereed by Howard Webb, was watched by a crowd of more than 78,000 people. West Ham United took the lead in the latter stages of the first half through Carlton Cole. Blackpool's Tom Ince scored the equaliser three minutes in the second half before Ricardo Vaz Tê's 87th minute strike secured victory and promotion for West Ham. It was West Ham's second win in three play-off finals. Their defender, James Tomkins, was named man of the match.

West Ham ended the next season in mid-table in the Premier League. Blackpool finished the following season in 15th place, nine points outside the play-offs and five points above the relegation zone.

== Route to the final ==
Football League Championship final table, leading positions
Pos	Team	Pld	W	D	L	GF	GA	GD	Pts
1	Reading	46	27	8	11	69	41	+28	89
2	Southampton	46	26	10	10	85	46	+39	88
3	West Ham United	46	24	14	8	81	48	+33	86
4	Birmingham City	46	20	16	10	78	51	+27	76
5	Blackpool	46	20	15	11	79	59	+20	75
6	Cardiff City	46	19	18	9	66	53	+13	75

West Ham United finished the regular 2011–12 season in third place in the Football League Championship, the second tier of the English football league system, two places ahead of Blackpool. Both therefore missed out on the two automatic places for promotion to the Premier League and instead took part in the play-offs to determine the third promoted team. West Ham finished two points behind Southampton (who were promoted in second place) and three behind league winners Reading. Blackpool ended the season eleven points behind West Ham.

Blackpool faced Birmingham City in their play-off semi-finals, with the first leg being played at Bloomfield Road. A long-range shot from Tom Ince ricocheted off Birmingham defender Curtis Davies past Colin Doyle late in the first half. The match finished 1–0, securing Blackpool's tenth consecutive play-off victory. In the return leg, played five days later at St Andrew's, Stephen Dobbie extended Blackpool's aggregate lead on the stroke of half time. Matt Phillips scored soon after the break to make it 3–0 on aggregate to Blackpool before Birmingham's Nikola Žigić scored midway through the second half. Davies reduced Birmingham's deficit to a single goal but the match ended without further scoring, and Blackpool qualified for the final 3–2 on aggregate.

In the other play-off semi-final, West Ham United's opponents were Cardiff City, with the first leg being played at the Cardiff City Stadium. A first-half brace from Jack Collison ensured the London club took a 2–0 lead to the return leg at the Boleyn Ground. Goals from West Ham captain Kevin Nolan, Ricardo Vaz Tê and Nicky Maynard secured a 3–0 victory and an aggregate 5–0 win, and qualified the club for their first appearance at Wembley since the 1981 Football League Cup Final. Collison was taken to hospital as a precaution with a suspected dislocated shoulder.

Blackpool			Round	West Ham United
Opponent	Result	Legs	Semi-finals	Opponent	Result	Legs
Birmingham City	3–2	1–0 home; 2–2 away		Cardiff City	5–0	2–0 away; 3–0 home

== Match ==
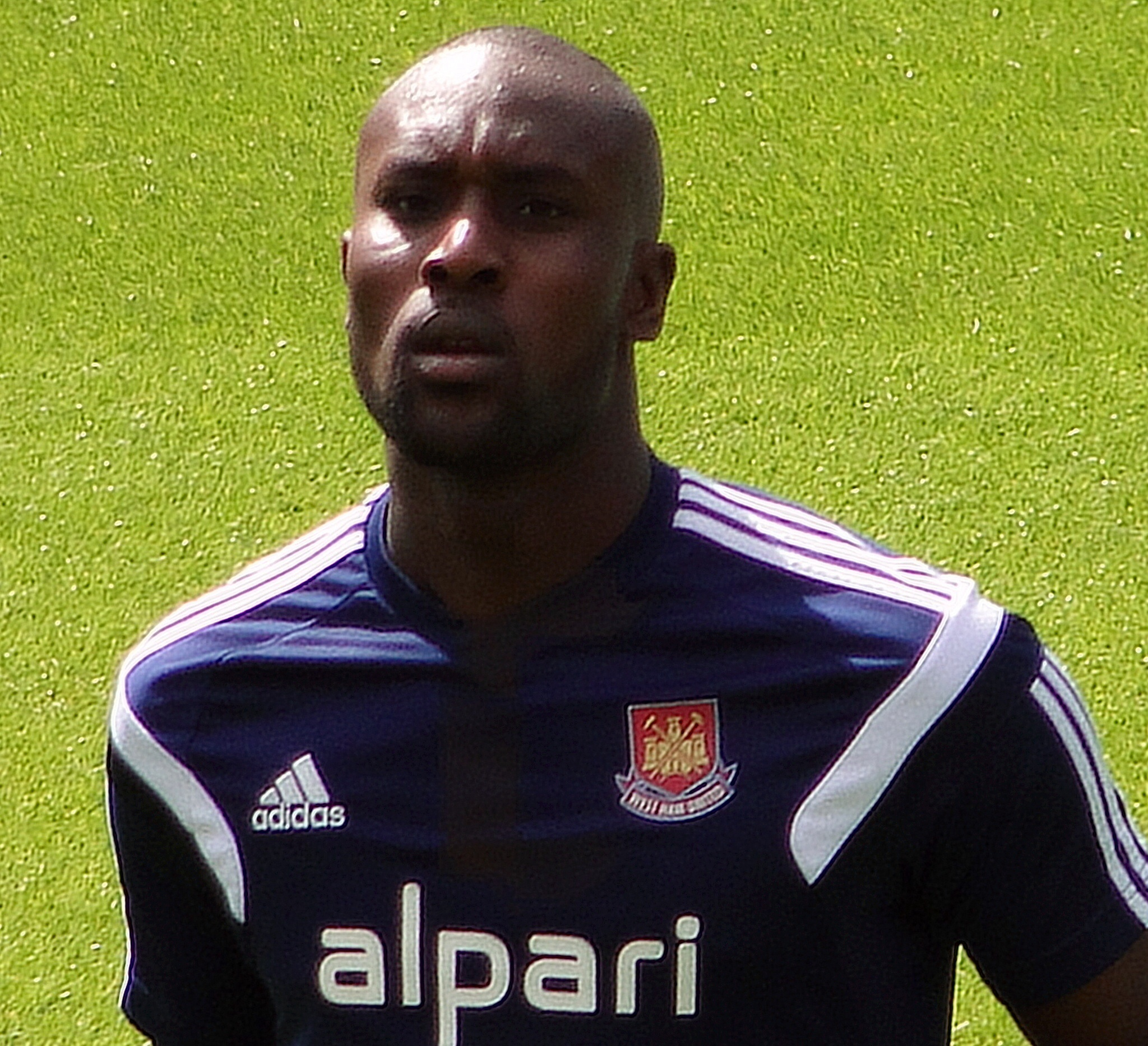
Carlton Cole (pictured in 2014) scored the opening goal of the 2012 play-off final.

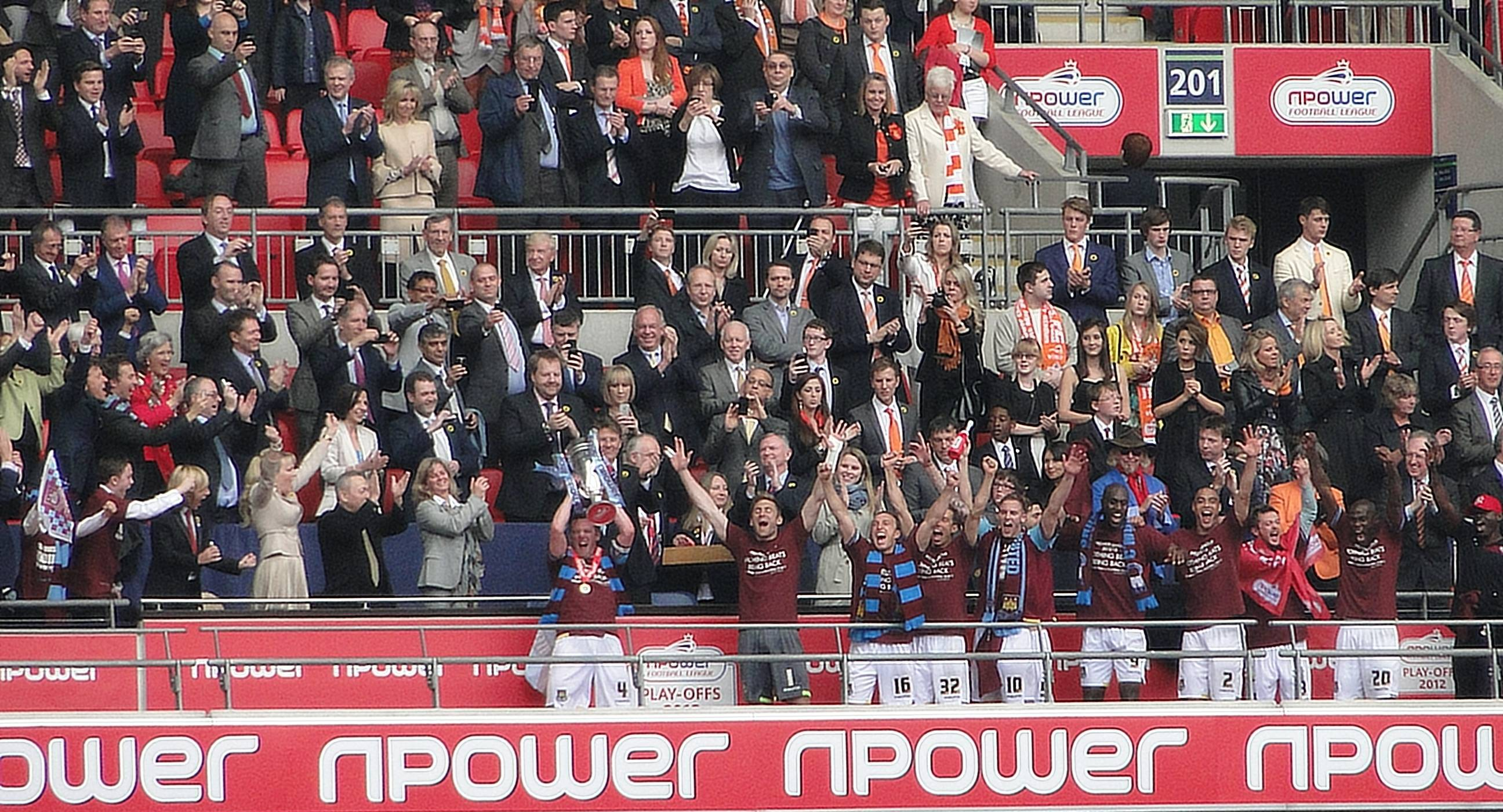
Kevin Nolan lifts the trophy at the end of the game

=== Background ===
This was Blackpool's second appearance in the second tier play-off final, having beaten Cardiff City 3–2 in the 2010 Football League Championship play-off final. Blackpool had also had beaten Yeovil Town at Wembley in the third-tier 2007 Football League One play-off final. West Ham also had play-off final experience having lost the 2004 Football League First Division play-off final against Crystal Palace but winning the following season's play-off final against Preston North End. During the regular season, West Ham dominated Blackpool, winning 4–0 at the Boleyn Ground in October 2011, and 4–1 at Bloomfield Road the following February. West Ham's Vaz Tê was the division's top scorer, with 22 goals to his name, including 10 while he was at Barnsley earlier in the season. Blackpool's top scorer was Kevin Phillips who netted 16 times during the regular season. The referee for the final was Howard Webb, with assistant referees Peter Kirkup and Mike Mullarkey, and Kevin Friend acted as the fourth official.

Blackpool went into the final without Gary Taylor-Fletcher whose injury during training prevented him from taking part. During Blackpool's regular season, he had contributed ten assists and eight goals; Phillips started in his place, and Czech striker Roman Bednář was named amongst the substitutes. West Ham's Collinson was cleared to play, despite suffering a dislocated shoulder in the play-off semi-finals.

=== First half ===
West Ham United kicked the game off around 3 p.m. in front of a Wembley crowd of 78,523. Almost immediately, the first chance fell to West Ham's Carlton Cole but Nolan's pass was too long and was picked up by the Blackpool goalkeeper Matt Gilks. At the other end, a mistake from Matthew Taylor allowed Dobbie to shoot but it was blocked by Green onto the post. Another chance for Blackpool came in the 14th minute: Matt Phillips was played in by Dobbie but he shot straight at Green who saved once again. Four minutes later, Vaz Tê's shot hits the side netting after a pass from Mark Noble. Collison’s shot then sailed high and wide of Blackpool's goal. On the half-hour mark, a series of four consecutive corners for West Ham came to nothing, but in the 34th minute the deadlock was broken. Taylor made a cross-field pass to Cole who took one touch to control the ball before shooting past Gilks to make the score 1–0. Another shot went wide from Vaz Tê three minutes later, and after one minute of stoppage time, the half was brought to an end with West Ham leading by the single goal.

=== Second half ===
Two minutes into the second half, Ince scored the equaliser for Blackpool. Cole lost the ball near the half-way line and a Matt Phillips pass over Winston Reid fell to Ince whose first-time strike beat Green in the West Ham goal. Kevin Phillips then played Alex Baptiste in and his lob over Green was cleared off the line by Taylor. In the 54th minute, West Ham made the first substitution of the afternoon, with George McCartney coming on to replace Gary O'Neil. Shortly after, Guy Demel was injured and was replaced by Julien Faubert. Taylor's cross was then headed high over the Blackpool bar by Collison. Vaz Tê's weak attempt was then cleared by Taylor before Gilks was forced to save a shot on the turn from Cole. In the 66th minutes, Dobbie's shot from the centre of the penalty area went wide, before Noble made a goal-line clearance to Baptiste, who struck the ball over the bar. Blackpool made their first substitution on 71 minutes, with Ludovic Sylvestre coming on to replace Kevin Phillips, and began to dominate possession. Green saved another Dobbie shot before West Ham's Nolan's volley struck the bar after Gilks' fingertip save. With three minutes to go Nolan passed to Cole who rode a challenge and collided with Gilks. Vaz Tê picked up the loose ball and hit it into the roof of the Blackpool goal, making it 2–1 to the London club. In the final minute of regular time, Dobbie and Ángel Martínez were replaced by Nouha Dicko and Bednář. Four minutes of injury time followed but with no change to the score, and West Ham were promoted back to the Premier League, one season after they were relegated.

=== Details ===
19 May 2012
15:00 BST

Blackpool	1–2	West Ham United
Ince 48'	Report	Cole 34'; Vaz Tê 87'

Wembley Stadium, London
Attendance: 78,523
Referee: Howard Webb (South Yorkshire)

Blackpool	West Ham United

GK	1	Matt Gilks
DF	5	Neal Eardley
DF	6	Ian Evatt
DF	15	Alex Baptiste
DF	3	Stephen Crainey
MF	23	Matt Phillips
MF	16	Barry Ferguson (c)
MF	31	Ángel Martínez	(substituted off) 90'
FW	7	Stephen Dobbie	(substituted off) 90'
FW	9	Kevin Phillips	(substituted off) 71'
FW	36	Tom Ince
Substitutes:
DF	20	Craig Cathcart
MF	4	Keith Southern
MF	14	Ludovic Sylvestre	(substituted on) 71'
MF	32	Nouha Dicko	(substituted on) 90'
FW	35	Roman Bednář	(substituted on) 90'
Manager:
Ian Holloway

GK	1	Robert Green
DF	20	Guy Demel		(substituted off) 57'
DF	2	Winston Reid
DF	5	James Tomkins
DF	14	Matthew Taylor
MF	10	Jack Collison
MF	16	Mark Noble
MF	4	Kevin Nolan (c)
MF	32	Gary O'Neil		(substituted off) 53'
FW	9	Carlton Cole
FW	12	Ricardo Vaz Tê	(yellow card) 89'
Substitutes:
GK	13	Stephen Henderson
DF	3	George McCartney		(substituted on) 53'
DF	18	Julien Faubert		(substituted on) 57'
MF	22	Henri Lansbury
FW	8	Nicky Maynard
Manager:
Sam Allardyce

Man of the Match:
James Tomkins (West Ham United)

Assistant referees:
Peter Kirkup
Mike Mullarkey
Fourth official:
Kevin Friend

Match rules:

- 90 minutes.
- 30 minutes of extra time if necessary.
- Penalty shoot-out if scores still level.
- Five named substitutes.
- Maximum of three substitutions.

=== Statistics ===
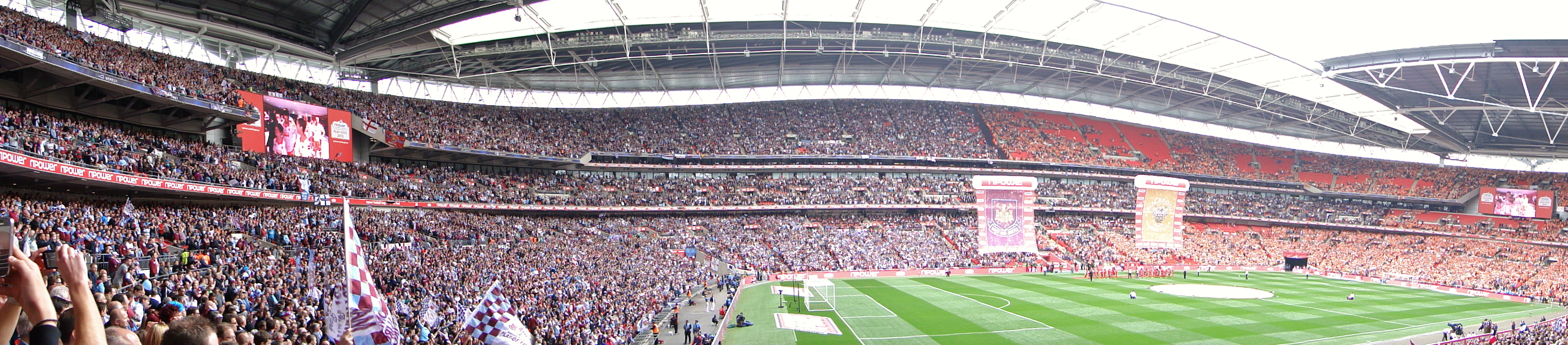
A panorama of Wembley before the 2012 final

Statistics
	Blackpool	West Ham United
Total shots	14	12
Shots on target	7	4
Ball possession	52%	48%
Corner kicks	4	5
Fouls committed	6	8
Offsides	3	5
Yellow cards	0	1
Red cards	0	0

== Post-match ==
The West Ham manager Sam Allardyce said: "I told you it was going to be difficult ... Blackpool were equally as good as us today but it's about taking your chances and never more so than on a day like today." His captain, Nolan, agreed: "Blackpool were fantastic today but there's always got to be one loser ... We didn't play our best today but I'm absolutely delighted for everyone here." Ian Holloway, the Blackpool manager, was downbeat: "We are left to regret the chances we missed. We have to get over it and bounce back." West Ham United's Tomkins was selected as man of the match.

West Ham ended the next season in mid-table in the Premier League, in tenth place and ten points clear of the relegation zone. Blackpool finished the following season in 15th place, nine points outside the play-offs and five above the relegation zone.
