= 2010 Danish Cup final =

- Event: 2009–10 Danish Cup
FC Nordsjælland	FC Midtjylland
2	0
- After extra time
- Date: 13 May 2010
- Venue: Parken, Copenhagen
- Man of the Match: Nicolai Stokholm (Nordsjælland)
- Referee: Nicolai Vollquartz
- Attendance: 18,856

The 2010 Danish Cup final was the final and deciding match of the 2009-10 Danish Cup tournament. It took place on Thursday 13 May 2010 at Parken Stadium in Copenhagen. It was contested between first-time finalists FC Nordsjælland, and FC Midtjylland who had lost their two earlier finals. Nicolai Vollquartz refereed the match in front of a crowd of 18,856.

FC Nordsjælland won the match 2-0 by two extra time goals by Nicolai Stokholm and Bajram Fetai, securing the club their first cup title. The Cup-fighter-award was handed to Nicolai Stokholm.

== Road to the Final ==
FC Nordsjælland			FC Midtjylland	
Ringsted IF [ZS] A 0–9	Bille 15', 22', 39', 53'; Laudrup 26', 35'; Mikkelsen 52'; Granskov 56', 83'	Second round		
AB [1D] A 1–4	Stokholm 29' (pen), 39'; Bengtsson 37'; Lawan 41'	Third round	Brønshøj BK [2D] A 1–3	Florescu 47' (pen); Ilsø 50'; Borring 89'
AIK Strøby 65 [S2] A 1–5	Bille 12', 20'; Fetai 28' (pen); Lawan 36'; Zuma 37'	Fourth round	Esbjerg fB [SL] A 0–5	Borring 5'; Thygesen 9'; Olsen 22'; Ilsø 49'; Kristensen 56'
Silkeborg IF [SL] A 1–3 (AET)	Jim Larsen 90+4' (og); Granskov 105'; Stokholm 111'	Quarter finals	Hobro IK [2D] A 1–2	Collins 55', 60'
Vejle Boldklub [1D] H 2–0	Bernier 79'; Granskov 90'	Semi finals First leg	Odense Boldklub [SL] H 2–0	Sivebæk 43'; Thygesen 82'
A 0–2	Bille 5', 47'	Second leg	A 2–2	Chris Sørensen 11' (og); Albrechtsen 64'

- FC Midtjylland entered the tournament in the third round.
- Square brackets [ ] represent the opposition's division.

== Match details ==
13 May 2010
17:00 CEST

FC Nordsjælland	2–0 (a.e.t.)	FC Midtjylland
Stokholm 97'; Fetai 106'	Report

Parken, Copenhagen
Attendance: 18,856
Referee: Nicolai Vollquartz

FC Nordsjælland	FC Midtjylland

FC NORDSJÆLLAND
GK	1	(Denmark) Jesper Hansen
RB	4	(Denmark) Henrik Kildentoft
CB	2	(Sweden) Benjamin Kibebe
CB	5	(Denmark) Andreas Bjelland
LB	27	(Sweden) Pierre Bengtsson
RM	9	(Denmark) Tobias Mikkelsen		(substituted off) 66'
CM	7	(Denmark) Nicolai Stokholm (c)
CM	18	(United States) Michael Parkhurst	(yellow card) 74'
LM	20	(Denmark) Matti Lund Nielsen		(substituted off) 60'
FW	15	(Denmark) Bajram Fetai
FW	16	(Denmark) Nicki Bille Nielsen		(substituted off) 99'
Substitutes:
LM	10	(South Africa) Sibusiso Zuma		(substituted on) 60'
LM	12	(Sweden) Rawez Lawan
RM	22	(Denmark) Andreas Laudrup		(substituted on) 66'
CB	23	(Denmark) Daniel Jensen
FW	24	(Denmark) Andreas Granskov		(substituted on) 99'
GK	25	(Denmark) David Jensen
CM	33	(Denmark) Philip Rasmussen
Manager:
(Denmark) Morten Wieghorst

FC MIDTJYLLAND
GK	49	(Denmark) Jonas Lössl
RB	3	(Germany) Kolja Afriyie
CB	5	(Denmark) Martin Albrechtsen
CB	29	(Denmark) Winston Reid	(yellow card) 84'
LB	19	(Denmark) Leon Jessen
RM	10	(Denmark) Mikkel Thygesen (c)
CM	43	(Nigeria) Izunna Uzochukwu
CM	17	(Denmark) Mads Albæk		(substituted off) 100'
LM	8	(Denmark) Jonas Borring
AM	7	(Denmark) Ken Ilsø		(substituted off) 73'
FW	30	(Nigeria) Baba Collins		(substituted off) 73'
Substitutes:
LB	6	(Denmark) Jesper Juelsgård
FW	11	(Denmark) Danny Olsen		(substituted on) 73'
GK	16	(Czech Republic) Martin Raska
CB	20	(Croatia) Kristian Ipsa
FW	23	(Denmark) Frank Kristensen		(substituted on) 73'
RM	34	(Denmark) Christian Sivebæk		(substituted on) 100'
FW	39	(Nigeria) Jude Nworuh
Manager:
(Denmark) Allan Kuhn
