= 2015–16 AGF season =

Aarhus Gymnastikforening (AGF or AGF Aarhus) is one of the oldest sport clubs in Denmark. The club was founded in 1880, mainly with Gymnastics but also Fencing as the main sports, though AGF later introduced a variety of other activities in both individual and team sports.

== Danish Superliga ==
19 July 2015 Match 1	AGF	2–1	Brøndby	Aarhus
18:00 CET	Vatsadze 8' 56'; Pedersen (yellow card) 84'; Skhirtladze (yellow card) 90+3'	Summary	Durmisi (yellow card) 28'; Pukki 45'	Stadium: Ceres Park; Attendance: 13,437; Referee: (Denmark) Jens Maae

27 July 2015 Match 2	Viborg	0–0	AGF	Viborg, Denmark
19:00 CET	Kamper (yellow card) 31'	Summary	Piscu (yellow card) 36' (yellow-red card); Vatsadze (yellow card) 66'	Stadium: Viborg Stadion; Attendance: 6,318; Referee: (Denmark) Michael Tykgaard

2 August 2015 Match 3	AGF	3–2	Randers FC	Aarhus
13:30 CET	Vatsadze (yellow card) 42'; Pedersen (yellow card) 59'; Petersen (yellow card) 61' (goal) 85'; Aabech 62' (pen.) 74'; Christensen (yellow card) 63'; Olsen (yellow card) 87'	Summary	Lundberg 27'; Borring 30'; Poulsen (yellow card) 42'; Johnsson (yellow card) 60'; Fischer (yellow card) 61'; Amini (red card) 65'; Fisker (red card) 86'	Stadium: Ceres Park; Attendance: 9,543; Referee: (Denmark) Kenn Hansen

7 August 2015 Match 4	OB	2–2	AGF	Odense
18:00 CET	Festersen 2'; Greve (yellow card) 35'; Skúlason 45'; Lund (yellow card) 65'	Summary	Aabech 30'; Vatsadze 61' (yellow card) 67'; Elez (yellow card) 90+5'	Stadium: TRE-FOR Park; Attendance: 9,932; Referee: (Denmark) Lars Christoffersen

15 August 2015 Match 5	AGF	2–3	AaB	Aarhus
16:00 CET	Elez 12'; Piscu (yellow card) 72'; Christensen (yellow card) 87'; Yasin 88'	Summary	Enevoldsen (yellow card) 4'; Spalvis 27' 51'; Jönsson 61'	Stadium: Ceres Park; Attendance: 10,114; Referee: (Denmark) Dennis Mogensen

23 August 2015 Match 6	Copenhagen	2–2	AGF	Copenhagen
18:00 CET	Augustinsson 23'; Delaney (yellow card) 41' (goal) 55'	Summary	Jønsson (yellow card) 22'; Andersen 38'; Bjarnason (yellow card) 78'; Aabech (yellow card) 85'; Nordstrand 89'	Stadium: Parken Stadium; Attendance: 18,837; Referee: (Denmark) Lars Christoffersen

28 August 2015 Match 7	AGF	0–0	Esbjerg fB	Aarhus
18:00 CET		Summary		Stadium: Ceres Park; Attendance: 11,321; Referee: (Denmark) Benjamin Svedborg

11 September 2015 Match 8	Hobro IK	2–1	AGF	Hobro
18:00 CET	Göckan Kaya 28'; Justesen (yellow card) 33'; Hansen (yellow card) 59'; Bøge (yellow card) 78'; Mikkelsen 89'	Summary	Olsen (yellow card) 38'; Hansen 45' (o.g.)	Stadium: DS Arena; Attendance: 3,350; Referee: (Denmark) Jens Maae

18 September 2015 Match 9	AGF	1–2	SønderjyskE	Aarhus
18:00 CET	Vatsadze 29'	Summary	Dalgaard 25'; Absalonsen (yellow card) 34'; Simonsen 86'	Stadium: Ceres Park; Attendance: 6,734; Referee: (Denmark) Dennis Mogensen

27 September 2015 Match 10	Nordsjælland	2–0	AGF	Farum
18:00 CET	Thychosen 14'; Ingvartsen 19'; Ramón (yellow card) 30'	Summary		Stadium: Farum Park; Attendance: 5,871; Referee: (Denmark) Anders Poulsen (referee)

4 October 2015 Match 11	FC Midtjylland	2–0	AGF	Herning
20:45 CET	Royer 31'; Ureña 63'; Olsson (yellow card) 83'	Summary	Elez (yellow card) 12'; Olsen (yellow card) 53'; Piscu (yellow card) 66'	Stadium: MCH Arena; Attendance: 5,604; Referee: (Denmark) Michael Tykgaard

18 October 2015 Match 12	AGF	3–0	Nordsjælland	Aarhus
13:30 CET	Aabech 23' (yellow card) 30' (goal) 90+3'; Vatsadze 45'; Elez (yellow card) 56'; Pedersen (yellow card) 81'	Summary		Stadium: Ceres Park; Attendance: 6,662; Referee: (Denmark) Kenn Hansen

23 October 2015 Match 13	Hobro IK	3–1	AGF	Hobro
18:00 CET	Damborg (yellow card) 11'; George 33' 45+3'; Bøge 45+1' (yellow card) 64'	Summary	Andersen (yellow card) 47'; Olsen 90'	Stadium: DS Arena; Attendance: 2,745; Referee: (Denmark) Lars Christoffersen

2 November 2015 Match 14	AGF	0–0	SønderjyskE	Aarhus
19:00	Mikanović (yellow card) 45+1'; Čavrić (yellow card) 81'	Summary	Guira (yellow card) 69'; Absalonsen (yellow card) 90+4'	Stadium: Ceres Park; Attendance: 5,240; Referee: (Denmark) Mads-Kristoffer Kristoffersen

6 November 2015 Match 15	Randers FC	4–1	AGF	Randers
20:30	Ishak 14' (pen.) 90+2'; Keller (yellow card) 30'; Borring 45+1'; Poulsen (yellow card) 63'; Masango 84'; Marxen (yellow card) 89'	Summary	Petersen 41'; Bjarnason (yellow card) 70'	Stadium: AutoC Park Randers; Attendance: 6,023; Referee: (Denmark) Jens Maae

22 November 2015 Match 16	AGF	1–1	Brøndby	Aarhus
18:00	Pdersen (yellow card) 42'; Khodzhaniyazov (yellow card) 47'; Olsen 70'	Summary	Austin (yellow card) 18'; Jønsson 24' (o.g.)	Stadium: Ceres Park; Attendance: 6,194; Referee: (Denmark) Dennis Mogensen

27 November 2015 Match 17	Viborg FF	1–0	AGF	Viborg
18:00	Curth 16'; Déblé (yellow card) 90'	Summary	Jønsson (yellow card) 53'	Stadium: Viborg Stadion; Attendance: 3,271; Referee: (Denmark) Jorgen Burchardt

4 December 2015 Match 18	AGF	2–1	FC Midtjylland	AArhus
18:00	Čavrić 3' (yellow card) 40'; Olsen (yellow card) 32'; Piscu (yellow card) 55'; Aabech 70' (pen.); Andersen (yellow card) 86'	Summary	Duelund 43'	Stadium: Ceres Park; Attendance: 4,892; Referee: (Denmark) Michael Johansen

27 February 2015 Match 19	OB	v	AGF	Odense
				Stadium: TRE-FOR Park

== DBU Pokalen ==
2 September 2015 Round 2	Kjellerup IF	1–8	AGF	Kjellerup
20:15		Summary		Stadium: Bjerget

22 September 2015 Round 3	Silkeborg IF	0–1	AGF	Silkeborg
20:15		Summary		Stadium: Silkeborg Stadion

27 October 2015 Last 16	Rishøj Boldklub	0–3	AGF	Køge
18:15		Summary	Piscu (yellow card) 3'; Mikanović 68'; Nordstrand 73'; Aabech 90'	Stadium: Lyngvejens Stadion; Attendance: 392; Referee: (Denmark) Benjamin Helm Svedborg

1 March 2016 Quarter Final	SønderjyskE	v	AGF	Haderslev
18:15				Stadium: Sydbank Park
