= Jesper Pedersen =

Jesper Pedersen may refer to:

- Jesper Pedersen (footballer, born 1961), Danish football player and manager
- Jesper Bøge Pedersen (born 1990), Danish footballer
- Jesper Pedersen (alpine skier) (born 1999), Norwegian para-alpine skier
