= Søren Nielsen =

Danish footballer

Personal information
- Full name: Søren Frimodt Nielsen
- Date of birth: 14 August 1982 (age 44)
- Place of birth: Køge, Denmark
- Height: 1.86 m (6 ft 1 in)
- Position: Midfielder

Team information
- Current team: Rishøj BK

Senior career*
Years	Team	Apps	(Gls)
2000–2008	Køge BK	188	(30)
2008–2009	Amager	13	(5)
2009–2011	HB Køge	63	(8)
2011–	Rishøj BK		

International career
	Denmark U19	4	(0)
- * Club domestic league appearances and goals as of 18:04, 14 July 2011 (UTC)

Søren Frimodt Nielsen (born 14 August 1982) is a Danish professional association football player who is currently playing at Rishøj Boldklub. He plays as a midfielder. His twin brother, Morten also plays for Rishøj BK.
