= David Jensen (footballer) =

Danish footballer (born 1992)

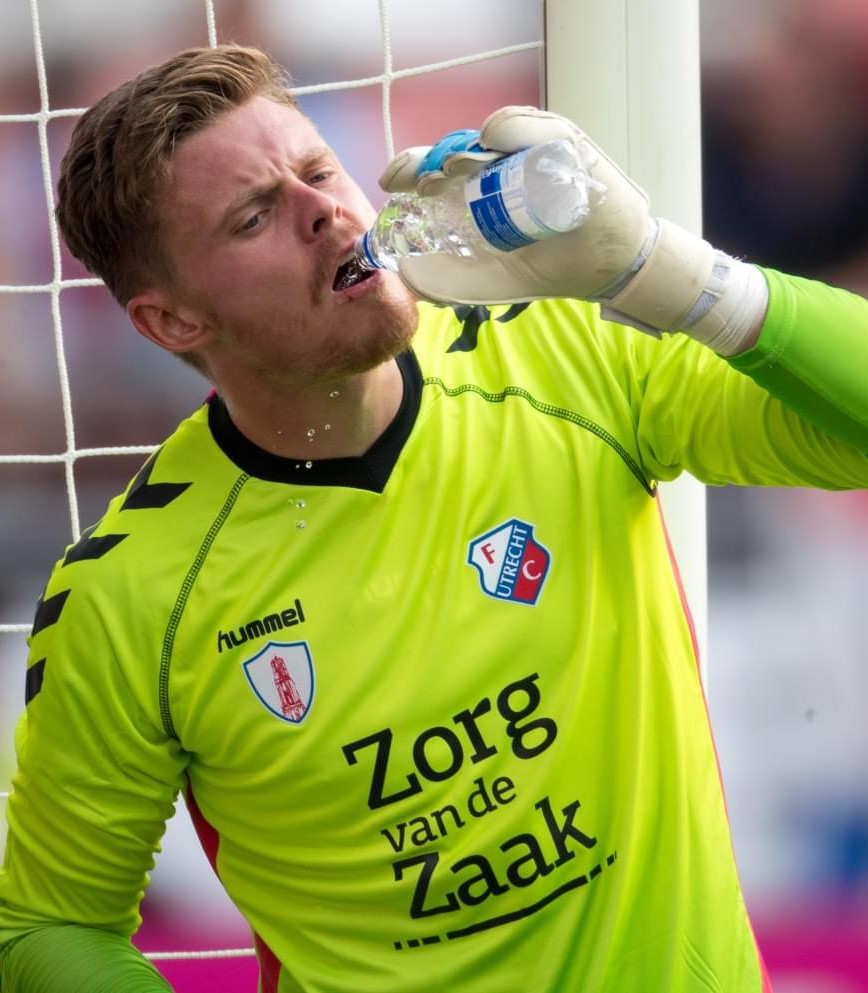
- Jensen with Utrecht in 2017

Personal information
- Full name: David Raagaard Jensen
- Date of birth: 25 March 1992 (age 34)
- Place of birth: Hillerød, Denmark
- Height: 1.95 m (6 ft 5 in)
- Position: Goalkeeper

Youth career
- Hillerød G&IF
- Nordsjælland

Senior career*
Years	Team	Apps	(Gls)
2011–2016	Nordsjælland	81	(0)
2012	→ FC Fredericia (loan)	4	(0)
2013	→ AB (loan)	12	(0)
2016–2020	Utrecht	86	(0)
2016–2018	Jong FC Utrecht	4	(0)
2020–2022	New York Red Bulls	11	(0)
2021–2022	→ Westerlo (loan)	26	(0)
2022–2023	İstanbulspor	46	(0)
2024–2025	Lyngby	9	(0)

International career^{‡}
2007–2008	Denmark U16	2	(0)
2008–2009	Denmark U17	10	(0)
2009	Denmark U18	5	(0)
2010–2011	Denmark U19	8	(0)
2011–2012	Denmark U20	3	(0)
2014–2015	Denmark U21	4	(0)
- * Club domestic league appearances and goals as of 3 December 2024 ‡ National team caps and goals as of 22:52, 5 August 2022 (UTC)

David Raagaard Jensen (born 25 March 1992) is a Danish retired professional footballer who plays as a goalkeeper. He has amassed a total 32 youth caps for Denmark under five different age groups.

== Early life ==
Jensen was born in Hillerød, Denmark, he began his youth career at Hillerød G&IF before going on to Nordsjælland where he has played since he was 13 years old, signing his first contract with the club at age 16. He would later go on trial with Celtic, but decided against a move to the Scottish club stating that though moving to a large foreign club would be a dream move, moving at 16 years of age was too young and that staying at FCN would be better for his development.

David Jensen has an older brother Daniel Jensen, a former FCN defender who also played for FC Fredericia.

== Senior career ==
=== Nordsjælland ===
David Jensen was promoted to reserve goalkeeper as backup to first choice Jesper Hansen in 2010. On 2 August 2011, he signed a new contract with FCN, keeping him at the club until 2014. On 31 August 2011, Jensen made his senior debut in goal against hometown team Hillerød Fodbold in the second round of the Danish Cup, keeping a clean sheet with a 5–0 win. He would play his second match for the senior team in the following round of the Danish Cup on 21 September, in a 2–0 win over 1st Division side FC Hjørring. David Jensen would go on to make his Superliga debut on 24 September, coming on as a 44th-minute substitute for the injured Jesper Hansen, in a 1–0 loss to AGF. He would make his first league start on 2 October, in a 1–0 win over SønderjyskE, but had to come off at half time because of an injury to his knees from a collision with another player. He was expected to be out of action anywhere between four and six weeks. After not featuring regularly for Nordsjælland, Jensen was loaned to FC Fredericia and AB during the 2012/13 season. Upon returning to the club he would become the first choice keeper for the next three seasons.

=== Utrecht ===
Jensen transferred to Utrecht of the Eredivisie on 28 July 2016. He made his first appearance for the club as an injury substitution in a 3–3 draw against Feyenoord. In his first season at the club he helped Utrecht to a fourth-place finish in the Eredivisie and qualification to the Europa League. In 2017, Jensen recorded his first clean sheet in European competition during the 2017–18 Europa League Second Qualifying Round in a 0–0 draw against Maltese club, Valletta.

=== New York Red Bulls ===
On 29 January 2020, Jensen signed with the New York Red Bulls of Major League Soccer. Jensen started the club's first game of the 2020 season and earned the victory over FC Cincinnati, 3–2."NEW YORK RB VS. CINCINNATI 3 - 2". soccerway.com.

On 7 July 2022, it was announced that Jensen and New York mutually agreed to terminate his contract.

==== Westerlo (loan) ====
On 17 June 2021, the Red Bulls announced that they had loaned David Jensen to Belgian First Division B side K.V.C. Westerlo. Jensen made his debut and earned his first clean sheet for Westerlo on 15 August 2021, during a 2–0 victory over Excelsior Virton. Jensen helped to lead Westerlo to the 2021–22 Belgian First Division B championship, playing 26 of 28 matches during the season.

=== İstanbulspor ===
On 30 July 2022, Jensen signed a two-year contract with newly promoted Süper Lig club İstanbulspor. In December 2023, Jensen and the Turkish club decided to part ways by mutual agreement.

=== Lyngby ===
On 3 January 2024, Jensen returned to Denmark, signing a 2,5-year deal with Danish Superliga side Lyngby.

As the playing time was not as both parties had hoped, Lyngby confirmed on 1 February 2025, that the parties had terminated the collaboration.

A few days later, Jensen announced his retirement from football.

== International career ==
Jensen was part of the Danish under-20 team that won the 2011 Milk Cup in Northern Ireland.

== Career statistics ==
=== Club ===
As of match played 13 November 2022

Club	Season	League			Domestic Cup		Continental		Other		Total	
Club	Season	Division	Apps	Goals	Apps	Goals	Apps	Goals	Apps	Goals	Apps	Goals
Nordsjælland	2010–11	Danish Superliga	1	0	0	0	0	0	—		1	0
Nordsjælland	2011–12	Danish Superliga	2	0	0	0	0	0	—		2	0
Nordsjælland	2012–13	Danish Superliga	0	0	0	0	0	0	—		0	0
Nordsjælland	2013–14	Danish Superliga	16	0	2	0	0	0	—		18	0
Nordsjælland	2014–15	Danish Superliga	32	0	0	0	—		—		32	0
Nordsjælland	2015–16	Danish Superliga	30	0	0	0	—		—		30	0
Nordsjælland	Total		81	0	2	0	0	0	0	0	83	0
FC Fredericia (loan)	2012–13	Danish 1st Division	4	0	0	0	—		—		4	0
AB (loan)	2012–13	Danish 1st Division	12	0	0	0	—		—		12	0
Utrecht	2016–17	Eredivisie	20	0	2	0	—		4 (Note: Appearance(s) in Playoffs Europa League)	0	26	0
Utrecht	2017–18	Eredivisie	33	0	2	0	6 (Note: Appearance(s) in UEFA Europa League)	0	4	0	45	0
Utrecht	2018–19	Eredivisie	33	0	3	0	—		2	0	38	0
Utrecht	2019–20	Eredivisie	0	0	1	0	2	0	0	0	3	0
Utrecht	Total		86	0	8	0	8	0	10	0	112	0
New York Red Bulls	2020	MLS	11	0	—		—		—		11	0
New York Red Bulls	2021	MLS	0	0	0	0	—		—		0	0
New York Red Bulls	Total		11	0	0	0	0	0	0	0	11	0
Westerlo (loan)	2021–22	Belgian First Division B	26	0	0	0	—		—		26	0
İstanbulspor	2022–23	Süper Lig	13	0	0	0	—		—		13	0
Career total			233	0	10	0	8	0	10	0	261	0

== Honours ==
Nordsjælland

- Danish Superliga: 2011–12
- Danish Cup: 2009–10, 2010–11

Westerlo

- Belgian First Division B: 2021–22

Denmark U20

- Milk Cup Elite: 2011
