= Morten Nielsen (footballer, born 1982) =

Danish footballer

Personal information
- Full name: Morten Frimodt Nielsen
- Date of birth: 14 August 1982 (age 44)
- Place of birth: Køge, Denmark
- Height: 1.80 m (5 ft 11 in)
- Position: Defender

Team information
- Current team: Rishøj BK

Senior career*
Years	Team	Apps	(Gls)
2001–2008	Køge BK	159	(12)
2008–2009	Amager	12	(0)
2009–2011	HB Køge	45	(1)
2011–	Rishøj BK		

International career
	Denmark U19	6	(2)
- * Club domestic league appearances and goals as of 17:49, 14 July 2011 (UTC)

Morten Frimodt Nielsen (born 14 August 1982) is a Danish professional association football player who is currently playing at Rishøj Boldklub. He plays as a defender. His twin brother, Søren, also plays for Rishøj BK.
