= Winston Reid =

New Zealand footballer (born 1988)

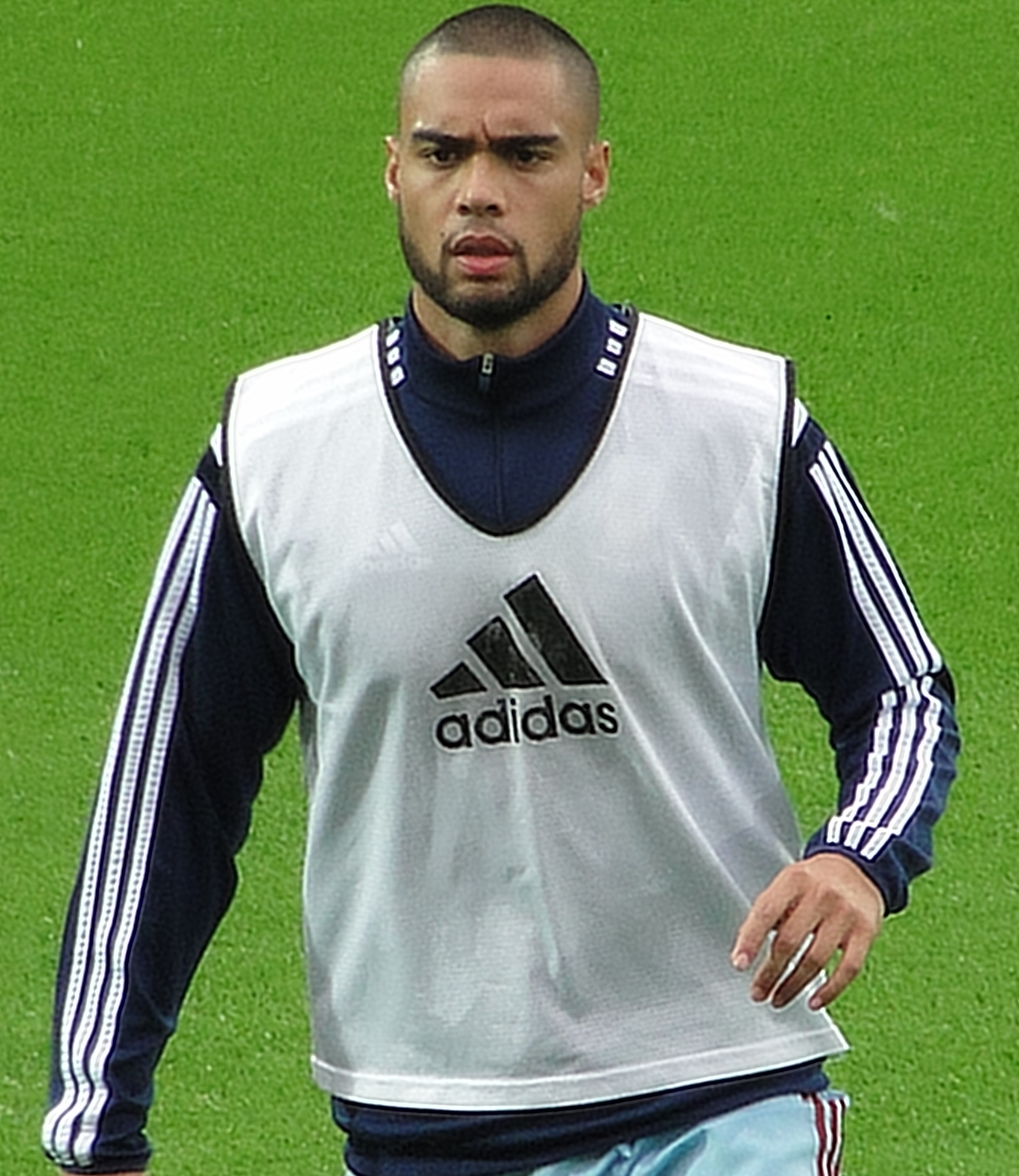
- Reid training with West Ham United in 2014

Personal information
- Full name: Winston Wiremu Reid
- Date of birth: 3 July 1988 (age 38)
- Place of birth: North Shore, Auckland, New Zealand
- Height: 1.91 m (6 ft 3 in)
- Position: Centre-back

Youth career
- 1992–1998: Takapuna
- 1998–2004: SUB Sønderborg
- 2004–2005: Midtjylland

Senior career*
| Years | Team | Apps | (Gls) |
| 2005–2010 | Midtjylland | 84 | (2) |
| 2010–2021 | West Ham United | 194 | (9) |
| 2020 | → Sporting Kansas City (loan) | 10 | (1) |
| 2021 | → Brentford (loan) | 11 | (0) |
| Total | | 299 | (12) |

International career
| 2007 | Denmark U19 | 4 | (0) |
| 2008 | Denmark U20 | 1 | (0) |
| 2008–2010 | Denmark U21 | 10 | (0) |
| 2021 | New Zealand Olympic (O.P.) | 3 | (0) |
| 2010–2022 | New Zealand | 33 | (1) |
- * Club domestic league appearances and goals

Winston Wiremu Reid (born 3 July 1988) is a New Zealand former professional footballer who played as a centre-back.

Reid is a former graduate of local Danish club FC Midtjylland's youth academy, and he started his professional footballing career with the club in 2005, at the age of 16. In 2010, he moved to England, signing for West Ham United in the Premier League, where he would go on to play for the club for a total of eleven years, and amassed a total of 222 appearances, scoring nine goals, until his departure in September 2021. During his tenure with West Ham, Reid made two separate loan moves away; Sporting Kansas City in the Major League Soccer, whom he played with for the remainder of the 2020 MLS season, and fellow English side Brentford in February 2021, where he helped the club achieve promotion to the Premier League in the 2020–21 season.

Born in North Shore, New Zealand, Reid moved to Denmark at the age of 10, and would go on to represent the country at various youth levels, and was a citizen of the country. However, he would switch to play for his country of birth in March 2010, and would later make his debut as a full New Zealand senior international in the same month. Across his time with the national team, he earned 33 caps for the side, scoring one goal. He had also captained the national team from 2015 to 2022, and represented New Zealand in the postponed 2020 Summer Olympics tournament in July 2021. Reid played his last international matches for New Zealand against Australia in September 2022, before retiring from international football.

== Early life ==
Winston Wiremu Reid was born 3 July 1988, in North Shore, an area in the suburbs of Auckland, New Zealand. Both Reid's parents have Māori ancestry. He affiliates to Tainui through his father and to Te Rarawa through his mother. He started playing football at the age of four with local club Takapuna. Reid moved from New Zealand to Denmark at the age of 10 with his mother and Danish stepfather, but always maintained contact with his biological father and his family in New Zealand.

== Club career ==
=== FC Midtjylland ===
Reid signed a youth contract with SUB Sønderborg. In 2004, the then 16-year-old Reid joined the academy of Danish Superliga club FC Midtjylland on a three-year youth contract. He was one of the first players to graduate from FCM's football academy, the first of its kind in Denmark, coming through the system alongside Midtjylland teammates Jesper Weinkouff, Christian Sivebæk and former teammate, Simon Kjær. While coming through the system, Reid helped the U19 win their first U19 Danish championship.

In November 2005, Reid signed a professional contract with FC Midtjylland. At the same month at aged 17, he made his FC Midtjylland debut in the Royal League tournament against Norwegian side Vålerenga in a 4–0 win. Reid made his league debut for FC Midtjylland, making his first start and played 60 minutes before being substituted in the 60th minute, in a 2–2 draw against SønderjyskE on 27 November 2005. It was not until on 19 March 2006 when he made another appearance for the side, coming on as an 88th-minute substitute, in a 2–0 win against Aarhus GF. Reid then received a handful of first team football towards the end of the 2005–06 season, which lead him to make nine appearances for the side.

At the start of the 2006–07 season, Reid appeared in the first three league matches before being sidelined with an injury. After missing three matches, he made his return from injury, coming on as a 76th-minute substitute, in a 2–0 win against Silkeborg on 10 September 2006. However, his return was short–lived when Reid suffered another injury, resulting him out for two months. Reid later featured in and out of the first team towards the end of the season. By the end of the season, he went on to make 11 appearances in all competitions.

Ahead of the 2007–08 season, Reid signed a contract extension with Midtjylland, keeping him until 2012. Shortly after, he made his first appearance of the season against AaB and helping the side win 2–1 on 8 August 2007. Reid continued to be featured in and out of the first team for the next three months. However, he was plagued with injuries and was out of the starting line–up for most of the season. By the end of the season, Reid went on to make nine appearances in all competitions.

At the start of the 2008–09 season, Reid became a first team regular and established himself in the starting eleven. He scored his first goal for Midtjylland in a 6–1 win against Bangor City in the first round of the UEFA Cup on 17 July 2008. Against Manchester City in the second leg of the UEFA Cup second round on 28 August, Reid successfully converted his penalty in the shootout, though Midtjylland lost 4–2 in the penalty shootout. Shortly after, he was linked with a move to City. On 29 September, Reid was sent–off for a straight red card in a 1–0 loss against Akademisk Boldklub in the third round of the Danish Cup. By the end of the year, he had been demoted to the substitute bench amid injury concerns. Reid was able to regain his first team place for the rest of the season. On 23 March 2009, he scored his first league goal in a 3–2 loss against Aab. This was followed up by scoring his second goal and setting up the club's second goal of the game, in a 3–1 win against AC Horsens. But during the match, Reid injured his right foot after clashing with Besart Berisha. After the match, he publicity criticised Berisha, calling him an "idiot" and rejected his apology. Despite missing two more matches later in the season, Reid went on to make 29 appearances and scoring three times in all competitions.

Ahead of the 2009–10 season, Reid continued to be linked a move away from the club, as Serie A clubs were interested in signing him. But Reid responded to the transfer speculation, saying that he was not in a rush to leave the club. At the start of the season, Reid continued to establish himself in the starting eleven, playing in the centre–back position. and started the first 17 league matches until he missed one match against FC Nordsjælland on 6 December. Reid then returned to the starting line–up, starting the whole game, in a 2–2 draw against Odense BK on 6 March 2010. He then followed up by keeping three consecutive clean sheets between 14 March and 25 March. During a 3–2 win against Copenhagen on 17 April, Reid suffered a shoulder injury that saw him miss two matches. On 13 May 2010, Reid started in the Danish Cup Final against Nordsjælland, and played 120 minutes after the game went extra time, as FC Midtjylland lost 2–0. Overall, he made 32 appearances during the season.

Following his performance at the World Cup, Reid was linked a move away from Midtjylland, with clubs from Europe interested in signing him. However, at the start of the 2010–11 season, he suffered a groin injury that kept him out for the first two league matches. But Reid made his return to the starting line–up, starting the whole game, in a 1–0 loss against Brøndby on 1 August 2010, which turns out to be his last appearance for the club. After leaving Midtjylland, Reid was named the club's Best Eleven by the fans.

=== West Ham United ===
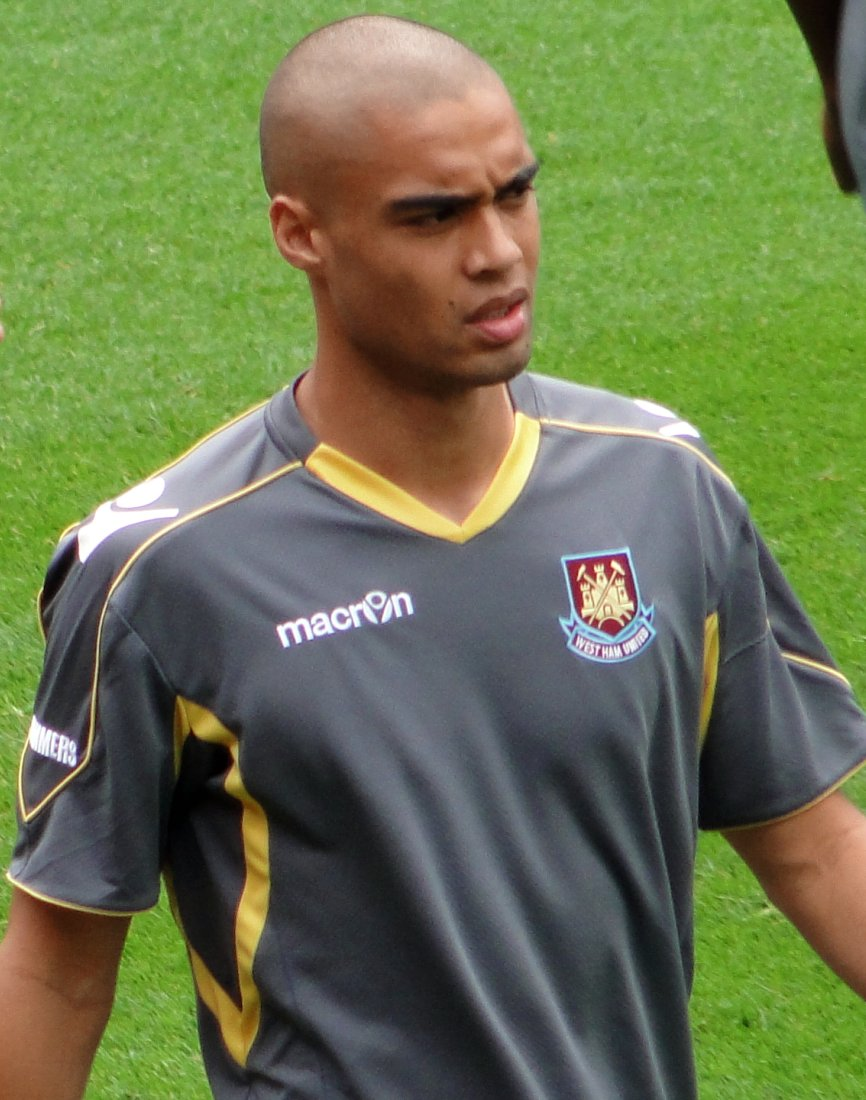
Reid warming up for West Ham United in August 2010

Reid signed for West Ham United on 5 August 2010, on a three-year contract for an undisclosed fee. His transfer fee was the subject of a dispute between West Ham and Midtjylland, as West Ham withheld the fee to bring to UEFA's attention fees owing to them from the sale of Alessandro Diamanti to Brescia.

Reid made his Premier League debut on 14 August, playing the whole game in a 3–0 loss to Aston Villa in the opening game of the season. After making another appearance in a follow–up match, he was dropped and found himself on the substitute bench, as well as playing in the reserve side for the next three months. It was not until on 27 November when Reid made his first team return, coming on as a 50th-minute substitute in a 3–1 win against Wigan Athletic. Between January and February, he made six starts for the side. Reid played an important role against Nottingham Forest in the fourth round of the FA Cup, assisting a goal for Victor Obinna, who scored a hat–trick, in a 3–2 win on 30 January 2011. He then scored his first goal for the club in a 5–1 win against Burnley in the fifth round of the FA Cup on 21 February. After the match, Reid said he dedicated to the victims and his families following an earthquake in Christchurch. Once again, however, Reid spent the rest of the 2010–11 season sidelined from the starting eleven, which saw him placed on the substitute bench, as well as, his own injury concern. In his first season at West Ham, which saw them relegated to the Championship, he made 12 appearances in all competitions.

Ahead of the 2011–2012 season, Reid stayed at West Ham despite being linked with a move away from the club. At the start of the season, he regained his first team place, playing in the centre–back position after the arrival of Sam Allardyce. Reid then scored his first league goal for West Ham in a 4–1 away win over Nottingham Forest on 28 August. Since the start of the season, Reid started in the first eight league matches until he suffered a hamstring injury that kept him out for two matches. Reid suffered a shoulder injury in the first half during a 0–0 draw against Bristol City on 2 November, resulting in him being sidelined for a month. It was not until on 31 December 2011 when Reid returned to the starting line–up, in a 2–1 loss against Derby County. He regained his first team place following his return from a shoulder injury. Reid scored the winning goal against arch-rivals Millwall in a 2–1 home win on 4 February 2012. However at the beginning of March, he suffered ankle injury that kept him out for a month. It was not until on 6 April when Reid returned to the starting line–up, in a 4–0 win against Barnsley. Two weeks later on 23 April, he scored his third goal of the season, in a 2–1 win against Leicester City. Reid played all three matches in the Championship Play–offs, as West Ham finished the season by winning the Football League play-offs against Blackpool at Wembley Stadium, and gaining promotion back to the Premier League at the first attempt. In his second season, he made 33 appearances and scoring three times in all competitions.

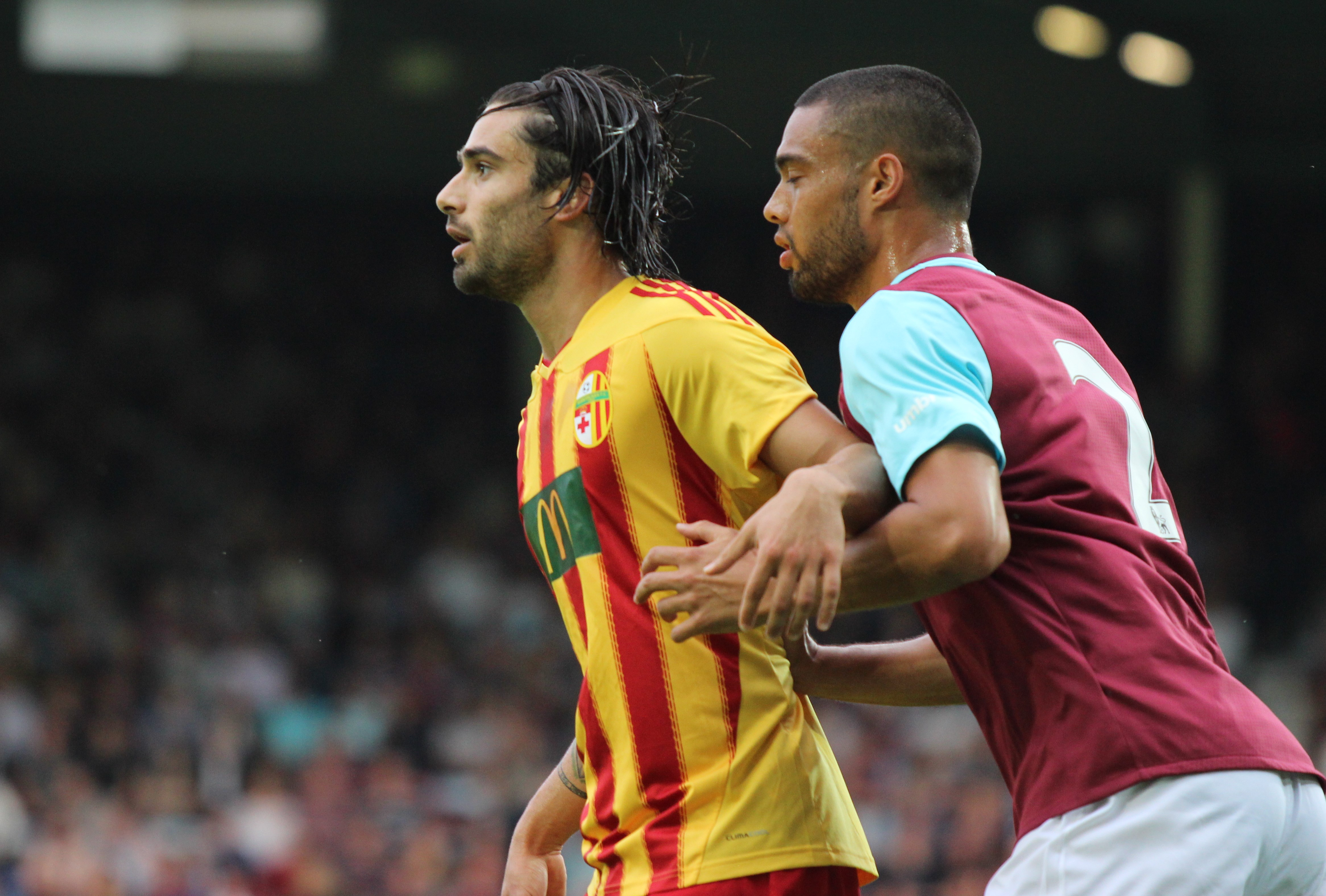
Reid (right) with West Ham marking Birkirkara's Rowen Muscat during a UEFA Europa League qualifying match in 2015

Ahead of the 2012–13 season, Reid opted to stay and train with his West Ham teammates ahead of the new Premier League season rather than represent New Zealand at the London Olympics. Reid started the season well when he helped West Ham United keep a clean sheet in a 1–0 win against Aston Villa in the opening game of the season. On 1 September, Reid scored his first Premier League goal in West Ham's 3–0 victory against Fulham. Despite helping the club collect four points throughout December, Reid's performance was a standout that he was named December's SBOBET Player of the Month by the club's supporters. Reid captained West Ham for the first time in his career against Manchester United in the third round replay of the FA Cup, a match they lost 1–0. Two months later, he became a stand in captain once again following injuries to Kevin Nolan and Mark Noble, coming against Stoke City and Chelsea. However, by April, he suffered a thigh injury that saw him miss two matches. Reid returned to the starting line–up against Manchester United on 17 April 2013, helping the side draw 2–2. It was announced on 1 May that Reid signed a two-year extension to his contract until the end of the 2014–15 season. Arguably his best season since joining the club, Reid was rewarded for his form on 8 May when he was named Hammer of the Year, as West Ham went on to finish the season in 10th. In his third season, he made 37 appearances and scoring once in all competitions.

At the start of the 2013–14 season, Reid started the season well when he helped the side keep two clean sheets in the first two league matches. Reid scored the opening goal in a 3–0 away win against rivals Tottenham Hotspur on 6 October 2013, ending the club's five league match losing streak. However, a month later, he suffered an ankle injury in training which required surgery. By late–January, Reid made a return to full training. It was not until on 1 February 2014 when he made his return from injury, starting the whole game, in a 2–0 home win against Swansea City. Following his return, Reid regained back his first team place for the closing months of the season and helped the club retain their status in the league, finishing thirteenth place. He made his 100th appearance for West Hamin all competitions on 15 April in a 1–3 defeat away to Arsenal. In his fourth season at the club, Reid made 22 appearances and scored once in all competitions.

On 20 September 2014, Reid scored the first goal after just two minutes in a 3–1 win against Liverpool at Upton Park. Reid started the first twelve matches of the season until he was sidelined for one game in late–November for his fifth booking of the season. He regained his first team place for the next 11 matches between December and February. This lasted until Reid sustained a hamstring injury during a 2–0 loss against Liverpool on 31 January 2015 and was sidelined for weeks. It was announced on 1 March that Reid signed a new six-and-a-half-year contract with West Ham, after much speculation over his future at the club, after being linked with London rivals Arsenal and Tottenham. Over the closing months of the season, Reid continued to be in and out of the first team, as he was plagued from injuries. In his fifth season at West Ham United, Reid made 33 appearances and scored once in all competitions.

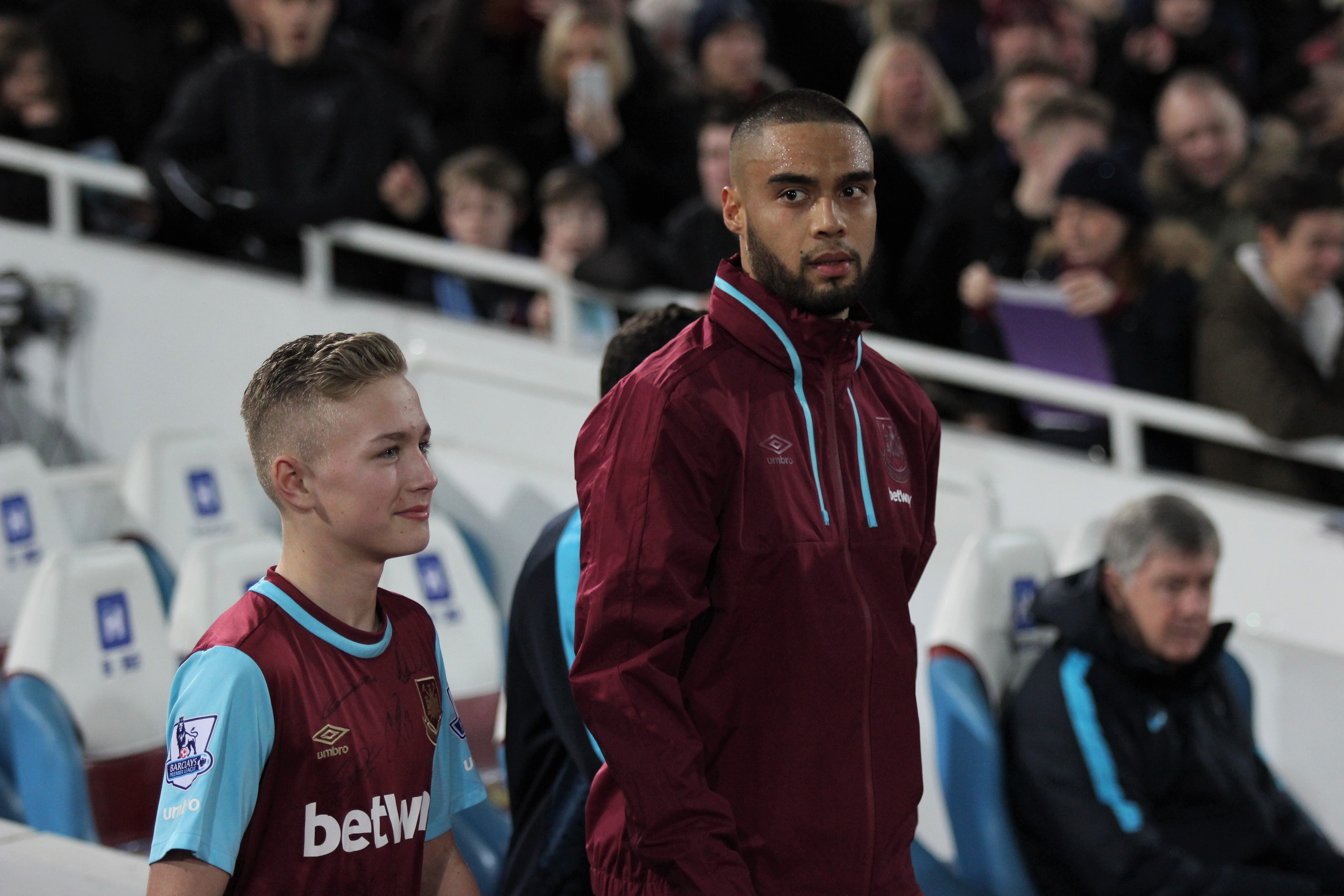
Reid with West Ham in January 2016

At the start of the 2015–16 season, Reid made his UEFA Europa League debut against Birkirkara in the first leg of the second round. In mid–October, Reid suffered a hip injury while on international duty and was sidelined for weeks, making his return on 7 November in a 1–1 draw against Everton. Reid captained the side for the first time in the season against West Brom on 29 November, but scored an own goal in a 1–1 draw. In a follow–up match against Manchester United, his performance was praised by ESPN. However, he was sidelined with a hamstring injury that kept him out for a month. It was not until on 9 January 2016 when Reid made his return from injury, starting the whole game, in a 1–0 win against Wolverhampton Wanderers in the third round of the FA Cup. He, once again, became a captain for the second time this season, as West Ham drew 0–0 against Liverpool in the fourth round of the FA Cup. But Reid suffered another hamstring injury that kept him out for a month. It was not until on 19 March when Reid made his return from injury, starting the whole game, in a 2–2 draw against Chelsea. He later regained his first team place over the closing months of the season despite suffering from injuries. On 10 May, Reid wrote his name into West Ham folklore when he scored the last ever goal at Upton Park in a 3–2 win against Manchester United. In his sixth season at West Ham, Reid made 30 appearances and scored once in all competitions.

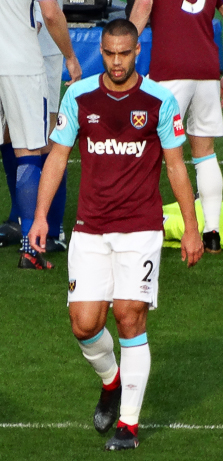
Reid with West Ham during a match against Chelsea in 2017

At the start of the 2016–17 season, Reid played all three matches of the Europa League Qualifying match, as they did not progress to the Group Stage after losing 2–1 on aggregate against Astra Giurgiu. Reid scored his first goal of the season in a 1–0 win against Sunderland on 22 October. After serving a one match suspension for picking up five yellow cards, he returned to the starting line–up against Tottenham Hotspur on 19 November and set up two goals, but was later–off for second bookable offence, in a 3–2 loss. On 26 December, Reid scored his second goal of the season, in a 4–1 win against Swansea City. Reid regained his first team place for the next three months. He also became a stand in captain following Noble's absence for a number of matches towards the end of the season. Despite suffering from abductor problems later in the season, in his seventh season at West Ham, Reid made 36 appearances and scored two times in all competitions.

Ahead of the 2017–18 season, Reid returned to full training following a knee injury. He also signed a contract extension with the club, keeping him until 2023. In early January 2018, Reid suffered a groin injury, keeping him out until 3 March when he played against Swansea, only to be taken off on a stretcher with an oxygen mask over his face after being knocked unconscious and twisting a knee, resulting in him being substituted in the 27th minute. After the match, it was announced that Reid was sidelined for the rest of the season. In his eighth season at West Ham, he made 20 appearances in all competitions.

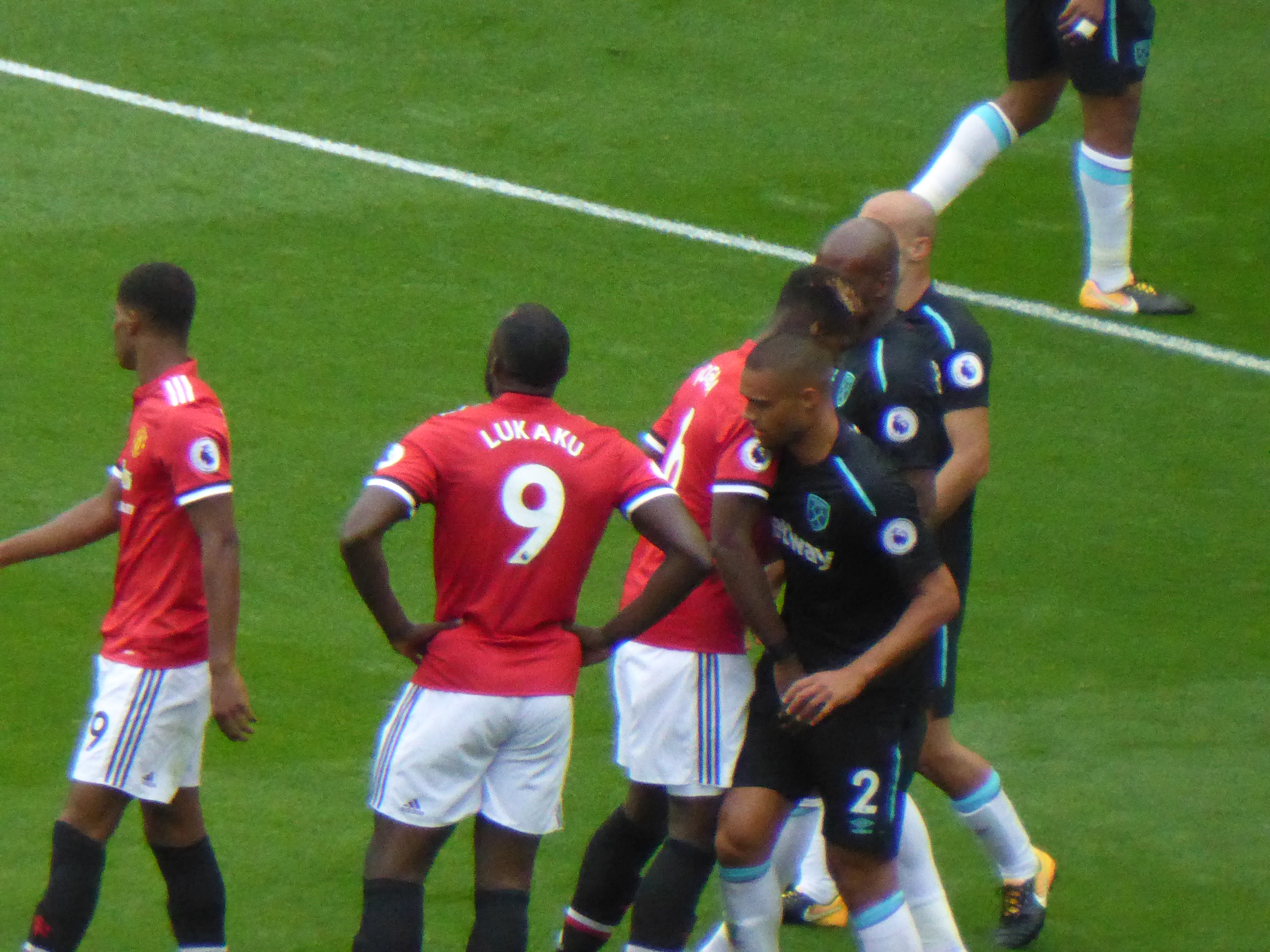
Reid (number 2) preparing to mark Manchester United's players during a match in August 2017

However, Reid did not play for the 2018–19 season, as he continued to recover from a knee injury. Ahead of the 2019–20 season, Reid made his first appearance in a friendly match against SCR Altach and helped them win 3–2 on 11 July 2019. After the match, he said: "You sometimes forget what it's like to play, so I was really looking forward to it. " However, Reid suffered a knee injury that kept him out for further three months. It was not until on 30 October when he returned from injury, playing 64 minutes for the reserve side, in a 3–2 loss against VfL Wolfsburg II. Reid made another appearance for the reserve side, in a 4–0 win against Aston Villa U23 on 22 November.

On 21 September 2021, after an 11-year spell with the club, West Ham announced that Reid had departed the club by mutual consent.

==== Sporting Kansas City (loan) ====
On 14 February 2020, Reid went to Sporting Kansas City on loan. Upon joining the club, he said: "The last 19 months hasn't been the easiest time in my career, but hopefully we’ve crossed that bridge now. I'm just looking forward to a new challenge. Whatever happened back in the UK happened, so I'm just happy to be here and I'm really excited for it.". In December 2020, Sporting Kansas City announced that they would not be signing Reid on a permanent transfer at the end of his loan and that he would return to West Ham.

==== Brentford (loan) ====
On 1 February 2021, Reid joined EFL Championship club Brentford on loan for the remainder of the 2020–21 season. On 3 February, Reid made his debut for Brentford in a 3–2 win against Bristol City, coming on late in the game as a substitute. It was his first senior game in English football since 2018. He played in the play-off final, helping Brentford gain promotion to the Premier League for the 2021–22 season. Reid was hailed as "a giant" by Brentford manager Thomas Frank for helping to get their promotion push back on track following his arrival at the club in February.

== International career ==
=== Denmark ===
Reid received Danish citizenship in 2006 and was subsequently called up for the under-19 national team. He played for various Danish age-grade representative teams, in particular the under-19s and under-21s, and played in the 2009 European Under-21 Championship qualification tournament. During a match against Serbia U21 on 11 October 2008, Reid was subjected to racism by the opposition supporters.

=== New Zealand ===
On 11 March 2010, Reid stated that he wanted to play for New Zealand's senior team, and on 13 March 2010 he made himself available for New Zealand's 2010 World Cup selection. On 10 May 2010, Reid was included in New Zealand's 2010 World Cup squad even though New Zealand national coach Ricki Herbert had never seen him play. He made his international debut in a friendly against Australia in Melbourne two weeks later. His second appearance came in the All Whites' shock 1–0 victory over Serbia, leaving Ricki Herbert "suitably impressed" with Reid's performance, supplanting Ben Sigmund on the right side of Herbert's three-man defence. On 15 June 2010, Reid scored an equalising goal in stoppage time against Slovakia in their opening game of the 2010 World Cup, thus securing a draw as well as his first ever international goal and New Zealand's first ever point in a World Cup finals match. He later made two more appearances in the tournament, as New Zealand was eliminated in the Group Stage. Despite the elimination, Reid later reflected on the tournament, saying it has changed his life.

On 12 October 2010, Winston picked up his first international red card against Paraguay in Wellington for a "vicious" studs-up tackle on striker Federico Santander in the 90th minute of the All Whites' 2–0 defeat.

Following the retirement of Ryan Nelsen from international football in 2013, Reid was named captain of the All Whites. His first match as captain came on 22 March 2013 against New Caledonia and set up a goal for Tommy Smith, who scored the winning goal, in a 2–1 win. Later in the same year on 7 November 2013, Reid was ruled out of the All Whites' FIFA World Cup playoff against Mexico, not only vacating the defence, but also with his successor as captain uncertain. It was not until 9 September 2014 when he made his first appearance for the national side in almost a year, as they lost 3–1 against Uzbekistan. Reid made his only national side appearance a year later on 7 September 2015 against Myanmar, helping the side draw 1–1.

On 9 October 2016, Reid made another appearance a year later against Mexico, which saw them lose 2–1. However, he missed a year from the national side once again, including missing out in the FIFA Confederations Cup in Russia. In October 2017, Reid was once again called up to the national side. He started the whole game against Japan on 6 October 2017, as they lost 2–1. The following month, Reid played in both legs against Peru, the world's 10th ranked team at the time, for a place at the 2018 FIFA World Cup in Russia, as New Zealand lost 2–0 on aggregate. After a two-year absence from the national side, he was called up to the national side in November. Reid made his first national side appearance in two years, coming against Republic of Ireland, where he captained and played 45 minutes before being substituted, as they lost 3–1. In July 2021, Reid was confirmed as a member of the New Zealand team at the 2020 Summer Olympics in Tokyo.

In August 2022, Reid announced his international retirement after the conclusion of the home-and away series matches against Australia. He played his final match for New Zealand on 25 September against Australia at Eden Park.

== Personal life ==
In addition to his native English, Reid is fluent in speaking Danish. In July 2015, Reid became a father for the first time when his wife, Yana, gave birth to twins, Ariana, a girl, and Damien, a boy.

In August 2015, Reid launched a footballing scholarship at Scots College, which were won by now-New Zealand footballers Sarpreet Singh and Max Mata.

As of August 2022, Reid and his family are based in and reside at Dubai, United Arab Emirates.

== Career statistics ==
=== Club ===
Appearances and goals by club, season and competition
| Club | Season | League | | | National Cup | | League Cup | | Europe | | Other | | Total | |
| Club | Season | Division | Apps | Goals | Apps | Goals | Apps | Goals | Apps | Goals | Apps | Goals | Apps | Goals |
|---|---|---|---|---|---|---|---|---|---|---|---|---|---|---|
| FC Midtjylland | 2005–06 | Danish Superliga | 9 | 0 | 0 | 0 | — | | — | | — | | 9 | 0 |
| FC Midtjylland | 2006–07 | Danish Superliga | 11 | 0 | 0 | 0 | — | | — | | — | | 11 | 0 |
| FC Midtjylland | 2007–08 | Danish Superliga | 9 | 0 | 2 | 0 | — | | — | | — | | 11 | 0 |
| FC Midtjylland | 2008–09 | Danish Superliga | 25 | 2 | 1 | 0 | — | | 3 (Note: Appearances in UEFA Cup) | 1 | — | | 29 | 3 |
| FC Midtjylland | 2009–10 | Danish Superliga | 29 | 0 | 2 | 0 | — | | — | | — | | 31 | 0 |
| FC Midtjylland | 2010–11 | Danish Superliga | 1 | 0 | 0 | 0 | — | | — | | — | | 1 | 0 |
| FC Midtjylland | Total | | 84 | 2 | 5 | 0 | — | | 3 | 1 | — | | 92 | 3 |
| West Ham United | 2010–11 | Premier League | 7 | 0 | 3 | 1 | 2 | 0 | — | | — | | 12 | 1 |
| West Ham United | 2011–12 | Championship | 28 | 3 | 2 | 0 | 0 | 0 | — | | 3 (Note: Appearance in Championship play-offs) | 0 | 33 | 3 |
| West Ham United | 2012–13 | Premier League | 36 | 1 | 1 | 0 | 0 | 0 | — | | — | | 37 | 1 |
| West Ham United | 2013–14 | Premier League | 22 | 1 | 0 | 0 | 0 | 0 | — | | — | | 22 | 1 |
| West Ham United | 2014–15 | Premier League | 30 | 1 | 2 | 0 | 1 | 0 | — | | — | | 33 | 1 |
| West Ham United | 2015–16 | Premier League | 24 | 1 | 4 | 0 | 1 | 0 | 1 (Note: Appearance(s) in UEFA Europa League) | 0 | — | | 30 | 1 |
| West Ham United | 2016–17 | Premier League | 30 | 2 | 1 | 0 | 2 | 0 | 3 | 0 | — | | 36 | 2 |
| West Ham United | 2017–18 | Premier League | 17 | 0 | 1 | 0 | 1 | 0 | — | | — | | 19 | 0 |
| West Ham United | 2018–19 | Premier League | 0 | 0 | 0 | 0 | 0 | 0 | — | | — | | 0 | 0 |
| West Ham United | 2019–20 | Premier League | 0 | 0 | 0 | 0 | 0 | 0 | — | | — | | 0 | 0 |
| West Ham United | 2020–21 | Premier League | 0 | 0 | 0 | 0 | 0 | 0 | — | | — | | 0 | 0 |
| West Ham United | 2021–22 | Premier League | 0 | 0 | 0 | 0 | 0 | 0 | 0 | 0 | — | | 0 | 0 |
| West Ham United | Total | | 194 | 9 | 14 | 1 | 7 | 0 | 4 | 0 | 3 | 0 | 222 | 10 |
| Sporting Kansas City (loan) | 2020 | Major League Soccer | 10 | 1 | 0 | 0 | — | | — | | 2 (Note: Appearances in MLS Cup Playoffs) | 0 | 12 | 1 |
| Brentford (loan) | 2020–21 | Championship | 11 | 0 | 0 | 0 | 0 | 0 | — | | 1 | 0 | 12 | 0 |
| Career total | | | 299 | 12 | 19 | 1 | 7 | 0 | 7 | 1 | 6 | 0 | 338 | 14 |

=== International ===
Appearances and goals by national team and year
| National team | Year | Apps | Goals |
|---|---|---|---|
| New Zealand | 2010 | 8 | 1 |
| New Zealand | 2011 | 1 | 0 |
| New Zealand | 2012 | 4 | 0 |
| New Zealand | 2013 | 4 | 0 |
| New Zealand | 2014 | 1 | 0 |
| New Zealand | 2015 | 1 | 0 |
| New Zealand | 2016 | 2 | 0 |
| New Zealand | 2017 | 3 | 0 |
| New Zealand | 2018 | — | |
| New Zealand | 2019 | 1 | 0 |
| New Zealand | 2020 | — | |
| New Zealand | 2021 | 1 | 0 |
| New Zealand | 2022 | 7 | 0 |
| Total | | 33 | 1 |

Scores and results list New Zealand's goal tally first.

| No. | Date | Venue | Opponent | Score | Result | Competition |
|---|---|---|---|---|---|---|
| 1 | 15 June 2010 | Royal Bafokeng Stadium, Phokeng, South Africa | Slovakia | 1–1 | 1–1 | 2010 FIFA World Cup |

== Honours ==
West Ham United

- Football League Championship play-offs: 2012

Sporting Kansas City

- MLS Western Conference: 2020

Brentford

- EFL Championship play-offs: 2021

Individual

- Hammer of the Year: 2012–13
- NZF Footballer of the Year: 2011
- NZPFA Players' Player of the Year: 2011
- New Zealand Footballer of the Year: 2014
- IFFHS OFC Men's Team of the Decade 2011–2020
- IFFHS Oceania Men's Team of All Time: 2021

== See also ==
- List of sportspeople who competed for more than one nation
