= Morten Avnskjold =

Danish footballer (born 1979)

Personal information
- Date of birth: 26 August 1979 (age 47)
- Place of birth: Denmark
- Height: 1.87 m (6 ft 2 in)
- Position: Midfielder

Youth career
- Rishøj IF
- Køge BK

Senior career*
Years	Team	Apps	(Gls)
1998–1999	Køge BK	20	(0)
1999–2005	Herfølge BK	118	(10)
2005–2007	Landskrona BoIS	54	(2)
2008–2009	SønderjyskE	18	(2)
2009–2010	FC Roskilde	3	(0)
2011–2014	Rishøj BK		

International career
1997	Denmark U-19	2	(0)

Managerial career
- 2011–2014: Rishøj BK (player assistant)
- 2016: Rishøj BK (caretaker)
- * Club domestic league appearances and goals

Morten Avnskjold (born 26 August 1979) is a Danish former professional football midfielder. He played with the Herfølge squad that won the 1999–2000 Danish Superliga.
