= Benjamin Kibebe =

Swedish footballer

Personal information
- Date of birth: August 13, 1981 (age 45)
- Place of birth: Addis Ababa, Ethiopia
- Height: 1.87 m (6 ft 2 in)
- Position: Defender

Youth career
- Rågsveds IF
- IF Brommapojkarna
- Hammarby IF

Senior career*
Years	Team	Apps	(Gls)
1999–2004	AIK	80	(2)
2005–2006	Tromsø	46	(4)
2007–2008	Aalesunds FK	35	(2)
2008–2010	FC Nordsjælland	56	(1)
2010–2012	FC Luzern	12	(1)
2012–2013	FC Midtjylland	9	(0)
Total		238	(10)

International career
1997–1998	Sweden U17	9	(0)
2000–2002	Sweden U21	6	(0)
2001	Sweden	1	(0)
- * Club domestic league appearances and goals as of 26 March 2013

Benjamin Kibebe (born August 13, 1981) is a professional former footballer who played as a defender. Born in Ethiopia, he won one cap for the Sweden national team in 2001.

== Career ==
=== Early career ===
Kibebe was born in Addis Ababa and moved to Sweden as a child. He began his career with local side Hammarby IF but in 1999 moved to their bitter rivals AIK as a senior played. He has said that the only reason he crossed the divide is that AIK offered him a professional contract and Hammarby didn't. During his time at AIK he was capped once for Sweden.

=== Norway ===
He spent 5 seasons with AIK and in 2005 moved to Norway to play in the Tippeligaen for Tromsø IL, the northernmost top-level football club in the world. Due to this Kibebe said that the team had to travel to most matches via plane. Kibebe had a successful year living in Tromsø as he played in the UEFA Cup. The club beat Danish club Esbjerg fB in the qualifying round then Turkish club Galatasaray in the First round to qualified to the group stages. The team were drawn in Group E alongside AS Roma, RC Strasbourg, FC Basel and Red Star Belgrade.

At the end of the 2006 season Kibebe left Tromsø IL for Aalesunds FK who had just been promoted from the 1. divisjon at the end of the 2006 season after finishing as runners up.

=== Denmark ===
After a successful time at Aalesund he was sold to Danish team FC Nordsjælland. In Denmark he quickly made a good name for himself where he was a strong contributor to helping the team win the Danish Cup 2010 for the first time in the club's history. Kibebe is noted for 21 games in the UEFA cup and scored the first goal of the FC Nordsjælland's UEFA Cup contest against the Scottish club Queen of the South.

=== Switzerland ===
On 5 May 2010, the day after FC Nordsjælland's Danish Cup victory he was bought by the Swiss Club FC Luzern. Kibebe signed a three-year contract.

== International career ==
Kibebe has played one match for the Sweden national team in 2001, and represented the Sweden U17 and U21 teams between 1997 and 2002.

== Honours ==
FC Nordsjælland

- Danish Cup: 2009–10
