= Morten Eskesen (footballer) =

Danish footballer and manager (born 1968)

Personal information
- Full name: Morten Eskesen
- Date of birth: 24 January 1968 (age 58)
- Place of birth: Denmark
- Position: Defender

Team information
- Current team: Denmark U18 (manager)

Senior career*
| Years | Team | Apps | (Gls) |
| 1987–2004 | Køge Boldklub | | |

Managerial career
- 2005–2006: Kalundborg GB
- 2006–2009: Greve Fodbold
- 2012–2015: Køge Boldklub (HB Køge reserves)
- 2016–2017: Karlslunde IF
- 2017: Køge Nord FC
- 2017–2019: Randers FC (assistant)
- 2019–2023: FC Helsingør
- 2023–: Denmark U18
- * Club domestic league appearances and goals

Morten Eskesen (born 24 January 1968) is a Danish former football player and now manager of the Denmark national under-18 football team.

He played for Køge Boldklub until retiring in 2004 and became manager of Kalundborg GB in the Danish 2nd Divisions in 2005.

In July 2019, he became new manager of FC Helsingør. In January 2023 he left Helsingør to become new manager of the Denmark national under-18 football team.
