= Bajram Fetai =

Albanian footballer (born 1985)

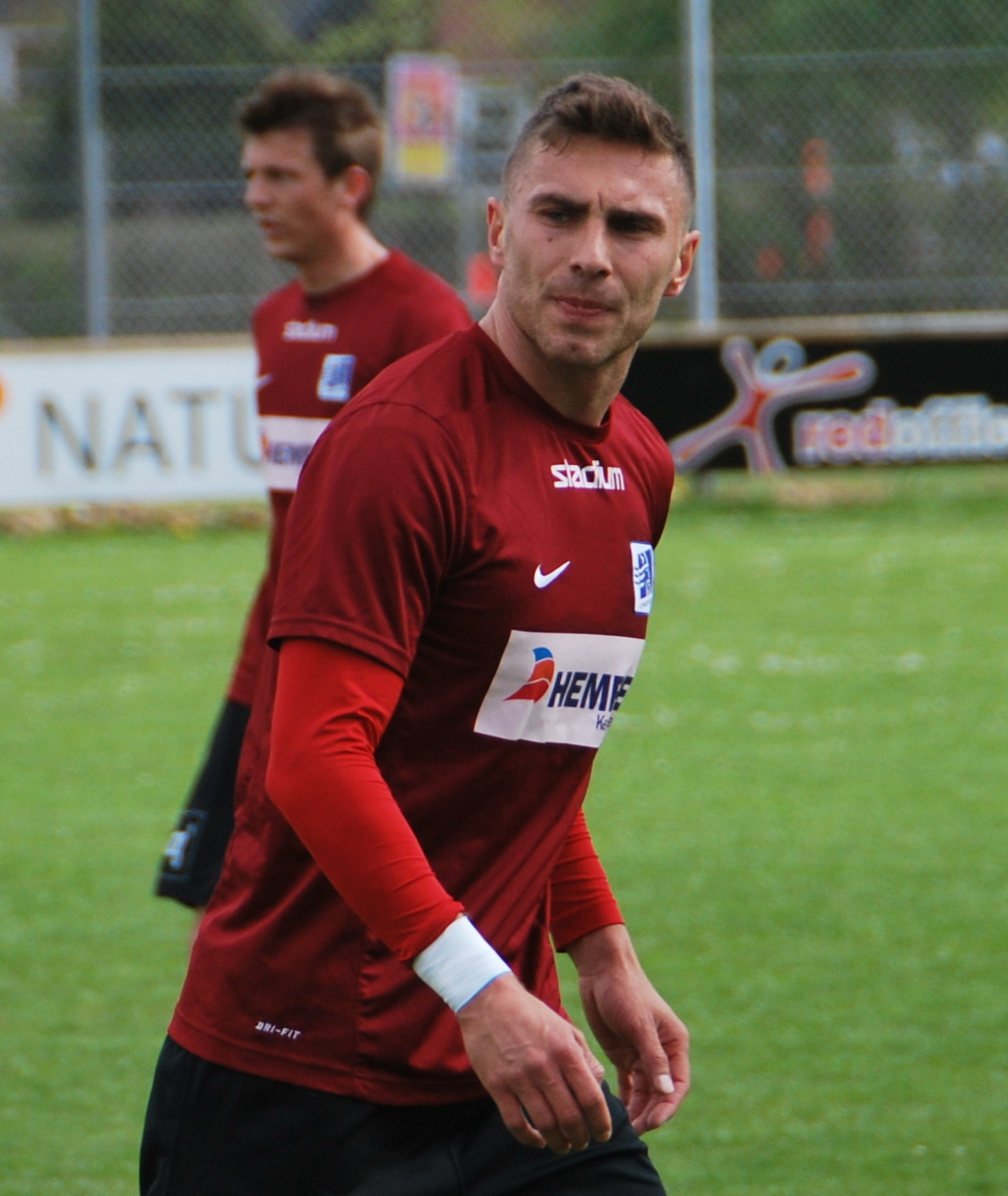
- Fetai in 2012

Personal information
- Date of birth: 7 September 1985 (age 41)
- Place of birth: Tetovo, SR Macedonia, SFR Yugoslavia
- Height: 1.80 m (5 ft 11 in)
- Position: Forward

Senior career*
Years	Team	Apps	(Gls)
2002–2003	B.93	26	(10)
2004–2005	Rangers	1	(0)
2005	→ Inverness Caledonian Thistle (loan)	9	(0)
2005-2006	Silkeborg	18	(2)
2006–2010	Nordsjælland	127	(27)
2011–2012	Lyngby	42	(6)
2012–2014	Denizlispor	36	(8)
2014–2016	FC Roskilde	55	(16)
Total		314	(69)

International career
2003–2004	Denmark U19	8	(4)
2005	Denmark U20	2	(2)
2009	Danish League XI	2	(4)
2010–2013	Macedonia	3	(0)

Managerial career
- 2017–2021: Nordsjælland (academy)
- * Club domestic league appearances and goals

Bajram Fetai (Macedonian: Бајрам Фетаи; born 7 September 1985) is a Macedonian football coach, former player, and actor. He is of Albanian ethnicity.

== Club career ==
He spent the early part of his career in Scotland, where he was a youth player at Rangers. At Rangers he made one first team appearance against Dunfermline in March 2004. The following season he had a loan spell at Inverness Caledonian Thistle before leaving Rangers for Silkeborg in 2005.

In 2010, he gained infamy after his "violent goal celebration" scoring for FC Nordsjælland against his old club Silkeborg, was widely distributed on the internet.

Fetai retired from football after his contract with FC Roskilde was terminated on 1 September 2016.

== International career ==
He made his senior debut for Macedonia in a November 2010 friendly match against Albania and has earned a total of four caps, scoring no goals. His final international was a June 2013 friendly against Sweden.

== Coaching career ==
In January 2017, Fetai was appointed coach in FC Nordsjælland's academy responsible for integration across levels. He held multiple positions in the Nordsjælland organisation, but left in January 2022 to focus on a café he owned in Copenhagen.

== Acting career ==
Fetai made his acting debut in 2022, after being cast in the role as Flori in Nicolas Winding Refn's television series Copenhagen Cowboy.

== Filmography ==
=== Television ===
Year	Title	Role	Notes
2022	Copenhagen Cowboy	Flori	2 episodes

== Honours ==
FC Nordsjælland

- Danish Cup: 2009–10
