= Thomas Hansen (footballer, born 1983) =

Danish footballer (born 1983)

Personal information
- Full name: Thomas Hansen
- Date of birth: 18 January 1983 (age 43)
- Place of birth: Denmark
- Height: 1.89 m (6 ft 2 1/2 in)
- Position: Center back

Senior career*
Years	Team	Apps	(Gls)
2003–2005	Brøndby IF	17	(2)
2005–2007	AGF	27	(0)
2007–2011	Silkeborg IF	54	(1)
2011–2013	SønderjyskE	41	(3)
2013–2014	Brønshøj BK	28	(0)
2014–2016	Hobro IK	31	(3)
- * Club domestic league appearances and goals

Thomas Hansen (born 18 January 1983) is a Danish former footballer. He was a defender, who was used as a central defender as well as right back.

== Career ==
Hansen played his youth football in Hvidovre IF and moved to Brøndby IF in 2003. He did not play regularly, and in his search for regular first team action he started looking elsewhere. He moved to AGF as of 1 January 2006 on a contract for 3 years. The contract was signed already in mid-2005, but the move was agreed to 2006 making him available on a free transfer. Hansen quickly settled in central defence, but in 2007 he lost his regular position. As of 1 February he had played 24 matches and scored 0 goals.
