= Daniel Jensen (footballer, born 1985) =

Danish footballer (born 1985)

Personal information
- Date of birth: 8 May 1985 (age 41)
- Place of birth: Hillerød, Denmark
- Height: 1.89 m (6 ft 2 in)
- Position: Defender

Youth career
- Hillerød GI

Senior career*
Years	Team	Apps	(Gls)
2004–2011	FC Nordsjælland	82	(2)
2011–2013	FC Fredericia	50	(2)
Total		132	(4)
- * Club domestic league appearances and goals

Daniel Jensen (born 8 May 1985) is a Danish former professional football defender.

== Honours ==
FC Nordsjælland

- Danish Cup: 2009–10, 2010–11
