= Jesper Pedersen (footballer, born 1961) =

Danish footballer and manager

Personal information
- Date of birth: 23 January 1961 (age 65)
- Place of birth: Denmark
- Position: Midfielder

Team information
- Current team: KFUM Roskilde

Senior career*
Years	Team	Apps	(Gls)
19XX–1989	Herfølge Boldklub	270	
1989–1990	Næstved IF		

International career
1985–1987	Denmark Liga		

Managerial career
- 1990–1994: Lellinge IF
- 1994–1998: Herfølge Boldklub (reserves)
- 1998–1999: Herfølge Boldklub
- 2000: Nykøbing Falster Alliancen
- 2000–2004: B93
- 2004–2005: BK Skjold
- 2006: Amager United
- 2006–2007: Holbæk B&I
- 2008–2014: Rishøj Boldklub
- 2014–2015: Rishøj Boldklub (director of sport)
- 2016: Herfølge Boldklub (HBK reserves)
- 2016–2017: Rishøj Boldklub
- 2017–2022: FA 2000
- 2022–: KFUM Roskilde
- * Club domestic league appearances and goals

Jesper Pedersen (born 23 January 1961) is a Danish football manager and former player who manages KFUM Roskilde.
