= Andreas Granskov =

Danish footballer (born 1989)

Personal information
- Full name: Andreas Granskov Hansen
- Date of birth: 5 March 1989 (age 37)
- Place of birth: Gladsaxe, Denmark
- Height: 1.81 m (5 ft 11 in)
- Position: Forward

Youth career
- –1999: Torveparken TPS
- 1999–2006: AB
- 2006–2008: Werder Bremen

Senior career*
Years	Team	Apps	(Gls)
2007–2009	Werder Bremen II	26	(5)
2009–2012	Nordsjælland	49	(10)
2009–2010	→ AB (loan)	9	(1)
2012–2013	Royal Excel Mouscron	0	(0)
2013–2014	Lyngby	10	(3)
2014–2016	Brønshøj	39	(7)
2016–2017	Fremad Amager	8	(1)
2017–2019	Køge Nord		
2020	Holbæk B&I	3	(0)
2020–2021	Tårnby FF		

International career
2005	Denmark U16	3	(0)
2004–2006	Denmark U17	17	(6)
2006–2007	Denmark U18	4	(0)
2007	Denmark U19	4	(0)
2009	Denmark U21	1	(0)
- * Club domestic league appearances and goals

Andreas Granskov Hansen (born 5 March 1989) is a Danish former professional footballer who played as a forward.

== Club career ==
Granskov joined German Bundesliga club Werder Bremen as a youth, making a number of appearances for the reserve team. After his time in Germany, he returned to Denmark to sign with Nordsjælland on 30 July 2009. Shortly after signing, he was sent on loan to AB. When Granskov left Nordsjælland in June 2012, he had made 53 appearances for the club, in which he scored 10 goals.

On 13 June 2012, Granskov signed with Belgian Pro League club Royal Excel Mouscron. Granskov, however, was injured for a long time during his spell with the club, and as a result failed to win a starting role.

After one season in Belgium, he returned to Denmark where he signed with Lyngby after a successful trial in July 2013. In January 2014, he signed with Brønshøj on a six-month deal. He stayed there for more than two years, before signing with Fremad Amager on 30 July 2016 where he played for six months. On 30 December 2016, it was confirmed, that Granskov had joined Rishøj Boldklub in the Denmark Series. In the summer of 2017, Rishøj was refounded as Køge Nord FC.

In March 2020, Granskov joined Danish 2nd Division club Holbæk B&I, forming a striking duo with fellow former Superliga forward Gilberto Macena.

After his retirement, Granskov began playing old boys football with FC Græsrødderne, joining the team in September 2021.

== International career ==
Granskov has been capped at international level for all teams from the Denmark under-16 to Denmark under-21 sides.

== Honours ==
Nordsjælland

- Danish Superliga: 2011–12
- Danish Cup: 2009–10, 2010–11
