= Jesper Bøge Pedersen =

Danish footballer (born 1990)

Jesper Bøge
Personal information
- Full name: Jesper Bøge Pedersen
- Date of birth: 22 February 1990 (age 36)
- Place of birth: Bogense, Denmark
- Height: 1.80 m (5 ft 11 in)
- Position: Right-back

Youth career
- Bogense G&IF
- Næsby
- 2005–2006: Midtjylland
- 2006–2007: OB
- 2007–2009: Midtjylland

Senior career*
Years	Team	Apps	(Gls)
2009–2010	Ikast fS		
2010–2012	Midtjylland	3	(0)
2012–2013	FC Fyn	16	(2)
2013–2024	Hobro	289	(3)

International career
	Denmark U18	2	(0)
	Denmark U19	12	(0)
	Denmark U20	4	(0)
- * Club domestic league appearances and goals as of 5 December 2024

Jesper Bøge Pedersen (born 22 February 1990) is a Danish professional footballer who last played as a right-back for Danish 1st Division club Hobro IK.

== Club career ==
=== Early career ===
In the school year 2005–06, Bøge attended sports school in Ikast (ISI). During that time, he played football in the academy of local Danish Superliga club FC Midtjylland, but when the school year ended, he returned to his hometown, Bogense, while his career continued in the youth of OB. However, it became a short visit to Bogense, and he returned to the academy of FC Midtjylland in December 2007.

=== Midtjylland ===
Bøge was part of the Midtjylland academy for some years, and signed a three-year contract extension in 2009. Midtjylland's reserve team, Ikast fS experienced some issues during their 2008–09 campaign, and in the summer of 2009, Bøge and two other teammates were promoted to the squad. However, he made his debut for Midtjylland on 6 December 2009 against FC Nordsjælland, where he replaced Jonas Borring in the 76th minute; his only appearance during the season. However, a month later, he signed a new contract and was permanently promoted to the first team squad.

In August 2011, Bøge suffered a groin injury and was out for three months. He returned in October, but suffered another injured in January 2012. Bøge did not make an appearance during the season, and afterwards stated that he was interested in being loaned out, due to a lack of playing time.

=== FC Fyn ===
On 3 August 2012, Bøge signed with Danish 1st Division side FC Fyn. He quickly became a key player for the team and was soon linked to a number of clubs. FC Fyn went bankrupt in January 2013, effectively making Bøge a free agent. He practiced at nearby division club Næsby Boldklub for a while, before being signed by Hobro IK.

=== Hobro ===
In March 2013, Bøge signed a one-and-a-half-year contract with Danish 1st Division club Hobro IK. He made his debut on 28 March against HB Køge, a match which Hobro won 1–0.

Bøge quickly became an important player for the team and extended his contract for two years, after a successful 2013–14 season with 32 league appearances, as Hobro won promotion to the Danish Superliga for the first time in club history. After Hobro suffered relegation to the 1st Division again after the 2015–16 season, Bøge helped the team to bounce back to promotion in the following season, where Hobro won the league.

He stopped in the club at the end of 2024.

== Honours ==
Hobro

- 1st Division: 2016–17
