= Danny Olsen =

Danish footballer (born 1985)

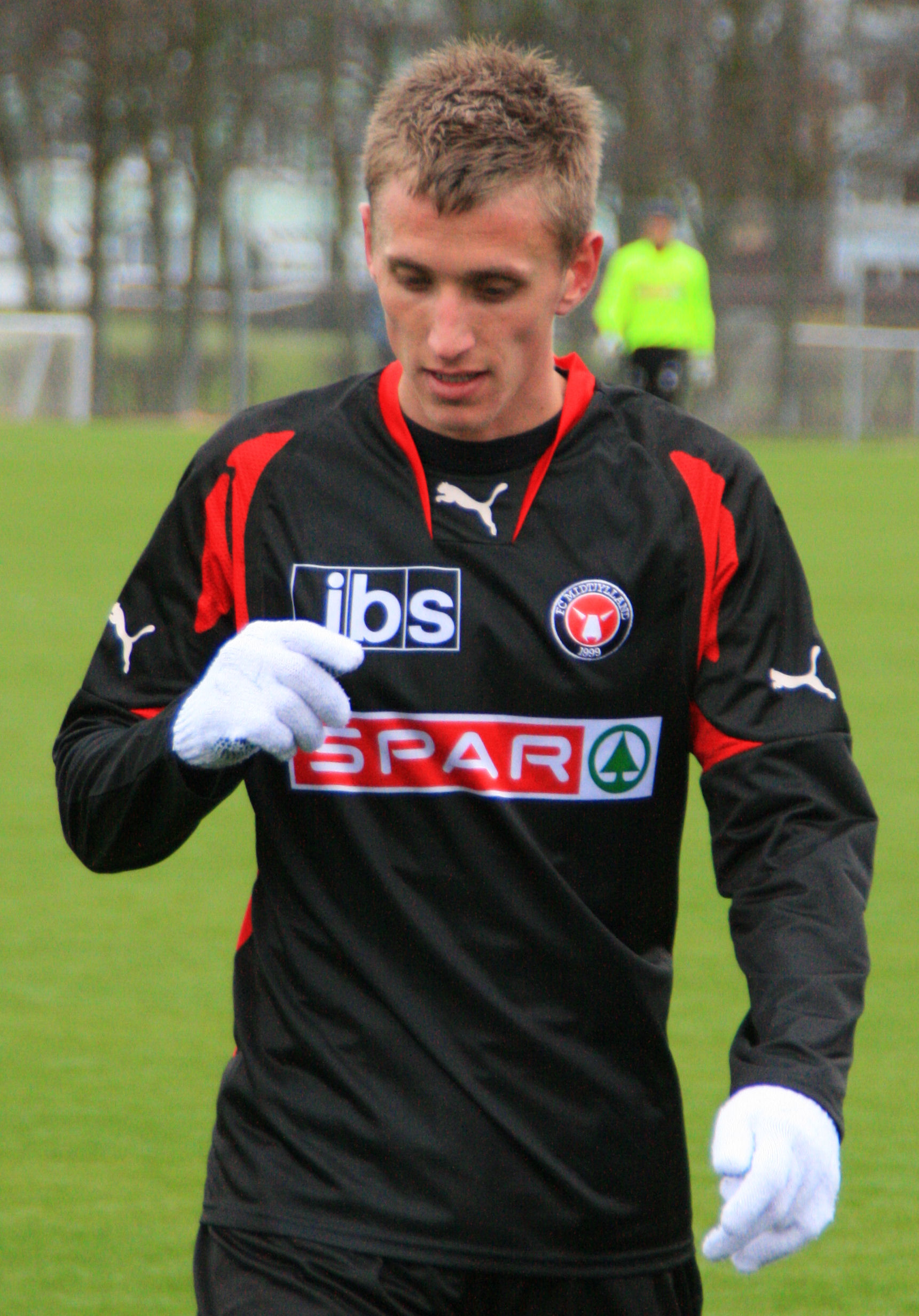

Personal information
- Date of birth: 11 June 1985 (age 41)
- Place of birth: Hvidovre, Denmark
- Height: 1.86 m (6 ft 1 in)
- Position: Midfielder

Youth career
- Rosenhøj
- Hvidovre IF

Senior career*
Years	Team	Apps	(Gls)
2003–2006	AB	13	(1)
2006–2007	FC Nordsjælland	29	(10)
2007–2013	FC Midtjylland	177	(33)
2014–2017	AGF	86	(17)
2017–2019	Hobro	35	(0)

International career
2004	Denmark U-19	2	(0)
2004–2005	Denmark U-20	6	(0)
2006	Denmark U-21	4	(0)
2009	Danish League XI	2	(1)
2014	Denmark	1	(0)
- * Club domestic league appearances and goals

Danny Olsen (born 11 June 1985) is a Danish retired professional footballer.
