= Køge Nord FC =

Association football club in Køge, Denmark

- Full name: Køge Nord FC
- Nickname: Klubben ved afkørsel 32 (English: The club at highway exit 32)
- Short name: KNFC
- Founded: 1971 (founded as Rishøj IF); 2004 (refounded as Rishøj BK); 2017 (renamed Køge Nord FC)
- Ground: Rishøj Stadium, Køge
- Capacity: 1,000 (no grandstands)
- Chairman: Frederik Svane
- Head coach: Dani Mujkanovic
- League: Serie 1
- 2022–23: Zealand Series – Group 2, 13th of 14 (relegated)
- Website: www.koegenordfc.dk
Home colours	Away colours

Køge Nord FC (abbreviated KNFC) is a Danish association football club, located in Ølby between a railroad and a highway, Køge Bugt Motorvejen, in the northern suburbs of Køge, Køge Municipality, and playing their home games at Rishøj Stadium (also known as Lyngvejens Stadium), which can hold approx. 1,000 standing spectators around a fenced football field with no grandstands. The East Zealandian club was originally formed as a football department in 1971 under the sports club, Rishøj Idrætsforening, before being refounded as an independent association football club under the name Rishøj Boldklub in 2004, and getting its current name in the summer of 2017. As of the 2023–24 season, the club's first team play in Serie 1 after having been relegated from the Zealand Series in 2023.

The club did not draw great attention to itself during its early years, where it was playing in the lower ranking regional leagues. In 1986, a steady climb began from the SBU Series 5 (level 10) to finally reaching the highest regional league, Zealand Series, in 1995 for the first time in the club's history, which was followed by participation in the 1996/97 edition of the Danish Cup. The senior men's team was promoted to the nationwide professional league divisions, Danmarksturneringen i fodbold, for the first time in 2010, where they played in the Danish 2nd Division for five seasons with two 3rd place spots (2012–13 (east) and 2013–14 (west)) in the final table as their best overall achievements in the Danish football league system, before being relegated to the lower ranking amateur levels in 2015. In the 2015/16 edition of the Danish Cup, the club reached the fourth round (round of 16), before being defeated at Tingbjerg Idrætspark by Aarhus GF.

== History ==
=== Rishøj IF Fodbold (1971–2004) ===
The club was originally founded as a merger between Ølsemagle Idrætsforening and Ølby Gymnastikforening at a general meeting at Kirstinedalsskolen on 17 June 1971, becoming part of the new sports club Rishøj Idrætsforening as consequence of the large building and population expansion in the adjacent area, especially relating to the conclusion of the building of Rishøjhallen. The two neighboring sports club, Skensved Gymnastikforening and Skensved Boldklub, were also involved in the negotiations regarding the merger, but earlier in the spring the same year the two clubs eventually choice not to participate. At the club's foundation, the club counted 500 members spread over four departments; gymnastic, association football and badminton. Per 1 October 1971, Rishøj IF fielded four senior men's association football teams consisting of 60 players, nine youth football teams and one women's football team, which in total amounted to almost 200 football players, that were all using a football field next to Kirstinedalsskolen and a field at Ølby Lyng borrowed by Kemisk Værk Køge (KVK; later known as Sun Chemicals). Before the first Danish football association organising women's association football, Dansk Kvinde Fodbold Union (DKFU), seized to exist during February 1972, the club's youth and senior women's teams were transferred to Zealand Football Association (SBU), and started playing in their first tournaments the same season. In 1972, Rishøj IF expanded with three departments (volleyball, table tennis and billiard) becoming the largest sports club in Køge Municipality with 1,200-1,300 members, in 1982 an 8th department (folk dance) was included, in 1990 Øslemagle Motion became the 9th department, and the 10th department (swimming) was launched in 1992.

Ølsemagle Gymnastikforening was founded at a meeting on Søvilla Hotel on 6 December 1940 by men and women residing in Ølsemagle, but was later renamed Ølsemagle Idrætsforening (ØIF) to better reflect the fact that the club now also included other sports departments than gymnastics The football department became the third department to Ølsemagle GF and played their matches a field referred as strandegnen facing Søvilla Hotel. As per 1 June 1969 Ølsemagle GF included departments for gymnastics, handball, badminton and association football (known as Ølsemagle Fodbold), which in 1970 became separate departments organised under one common board. Ølby Gymnastikforening had been founded on 19 October 1955 and a football department (also referred to as Ølby Boldklub) was included in the spring of 1956 with the support of the company, Kemisk Værk Køge (KVK), who made their field at Ølby Lyng available for free to the new club. In order for the new sport club to be founded, both Øslemagle IF and Ølby GF had to be dissolved beforehand. Øslemagle IF held an extraordinary general meeting the same evening, dissolving the club, just ahead of Rishøj IF's founding meeting, where all the members of both founding clubs were invited. The highest ranking senior men's team of the two founding clubs, Øslemagle IF Fodbold, was playing in the SBU Series 4 league in the 1971 season and hence transferred their playing license to Rishøj IF's football department, which for the 1972-season would also be presiding over a reserve team at the same league level and a second reserve team in SBU Series 5 league. Due to the club being founded halfway through the season, the first board of the new club decided, that each team would continue playing the remaining part of season under the previous names, under which they had been registered for their tournaments, and then switch to the new sport club's name from the beginning of the tournaments' upcoming season.

In the 1991-season, the senior men's team for the football department finished as the runners-up in the Zealand Football Association's regional league group at the fourth level, Series 3, (8th level in the overall Danish football league system), which gained them promotion to the SBU Series 2. The team lost the season's last match away against Lellinge IF (ending the season at the first place), which would otherwise secured the group league title and qualification for the overall Zealand Series 4 League Championship title. The club's first team only stayed in the league for one season, as they were promoted once again with the guidance of their coach René Haargaard. This time, the team finished ahead of their old rivals, Lellinge IF (located less than 6 km between each other's respective home grounds), securing the league group title and eventually winning the trophy for the Series 2 League Championship — after winning their semi-final match 2–1 against the second reserve team of Roskilde B1906 on 24 October 1992 and the league final on 31 October 1992 at their own home ground, Lyngvejens Stadium in front of 300 spectators, against the reserve team for Hillerød G&IF with the score 2–1.

In 1996, the club saw their best men's team relegated from the regional top-flight football league for Zealand. Finishing the SBU Series 1, group 2 — with the participation of the southernmost placed teams in the Zealand FA's second tier — in third place in the 1998-season, Rishøj IF qualified for two extraordinary promotion matches against the third placed team in the northern group of SBU Series 1, Søllerød BK. The first play-off match was lost with the score 1–0 at their home ground, while the second play-off match in Søllerød ended in a draw, 0–0, hence forcing the club to stay in the same level for another season. After 6 seasons (from 1997 to 2002) playing in the SBU Series 1 with mostly mediocre final standings in the league, Rishøj IF returned to the Zealand Series in 2003. The promotion was secured in the very last match of the 2002-season, playing in front of a near record attendance of 300-400 spectators, when the club won 3–1 in their home match against the reserves of Holbæk B&IF, hence taken over the second automatic promotion spot in the league from their opponents in the match.

=== Rishøj Boldklub (2004–2017) ===
Due to an increasing amount of discrepancies between the different outdoor and indoor departments, the sport association's football department decided to split from the sports club in 2003 and formed its own separate association football club at an extraordinary general assembly meeting on 15 March 2004 under the name Rishøj Boldklub. The new independent club acquired the playing license of the old football department of the sports club, which at that time had just played their third match of the 2004 season in the Zealand FA's regional top league, Zealand Series. Although the football department was refounded as an independent football club, the regional football association regarded this as a name changed.

In the summer of 2008, Jesper »Købmand« Pedersen was hired as manager for the club's best senior team and helped the team get promoted to the Denmark Series during his first season with the team. Only one year later, in 2010, the senior men's team reached the 3rd highest football league in Denmark, the Danish 2nd Division by narrowly finishing in the 3rd promotion spot, which happened at the same time as the expulsion of 8 reserve teams after the conclusion of the 2009–10 Danish 2nd Divisions. The first team managed to stay in the professional divisions for five seasons as a club with amateur status, before being relegated to Denmark Series in 2015. Due to the implementation of a new professional league structure, the size of the two Danish 2nd Divisions was reduced with 25 percent and the numbers of relegation spots were increased to eleven teams in the summer of 2015. Under the guidance of head coach Thomas Skov, the team narrowly lost the two relegation play-off games in late June 2015 against Middelfart Fodbold due to the away goals rule, when the Funen-based club scored a last-minute reduction goal in the second match. In the following season, the East Zealandian football club reached the fourth proper round of the Danish Cup, where they eventually lost their round of 16-match against the Superliga-club, AGF Aarhus, played at Tingbjerg Idrætspark, away from their normal home ground, due to the lack of floodlights required for the television transmission of the cup match in the evening. The same month, on 6 October 2015, an artificial pitch situated next to Rishøj Stadium was inaugurated.

Manager Jesper »Købmand« Pedersen, who returned to the club in January 2017, was sacked following the relegation from the Denmark Series in the 2016/17-season, while the assistant manager, Dennis Danry and player/sporting director Morten Avnskjold resigned shortly thereafter and were replaced by Morten Eskesen as manager and player/director Andreas Granskov, starting 1 July 2017. Eskesen came from a position as manager for the league rivals, Karslunde IF Fodbold, who survived the relegation struggles at the expense of Rishøj BK, which had impressed the club's management.

=== Køge Nord FC (2017–present) ===
At an extraordinary general assembly meeting on 2 October 2016, the club members unanimously approved that the name of the first senior men's team would be changed from Rishøj Boldklub to Køge Nord FC due to the aspirations of quickly being recognised as a football club rather than a sports club besides having less difficulty explaining the club's location towards e.g. new sponsors. The area of Øslemagle or Ølby Lyng is also referred to as Køge Nord (English: Northern Køge). At the same time a mandate was given for a proposed creation of a professional superstructure surrounding the first senior team, that would be financially independent from the rest of the club. The financial separation of the first team into an independent company would not become relevant before the club reached the professional leagues, necessary in order to sign binding football contracts with players in Denmark. The new name and the future proposed prospects for a professional superstructure coincided with the financial investment of the Danish comedian and actor, Andreas Bo Pedersen, who assumed a role as the club's new elite manager shortly after getting involved in March 2016, proclaiming an ambition of returning the club's first team to the 2nd Division within a three years time frame and in the long run focusing on building a large loyal fan base. The new slogan for the club was chosen as »Klubben ved afkørsel 32« (literally in English: The club at highway exit 32), which, together with the new name, was conceived by Anders Bo Pedersen and one of his friends from the advertising industry. At the beginning of 2017, it was decided that the name change should include the entire club, both effective officially as of 1 July 2017.

The new manager, Morten Eskesen, was tasked with the mission of returning the club to the Danish 2nd Division within the original proclaimed three years time frame, and received permission to put together a new team from the ground up, replacing 10 players during the summer of 2017, primarily from Karlslunde IF, and naming the defender Henrik Volquardsen as the captain. The first six league matches since the rebranding was officially launched in July 2017, were all won, and the club finished the fall season of the 2017–18 Zealand Series (group 2) in second place. On 31 August 2017, after approximately a month's employment in the club and just having two matches played in the fall season, Morten Eskesen signed a new contract for a position as assistant manager with the Superliga-club Randers FC. Morten Eskesen commuted between his manager position at the Køge-based club and his new position in Randers until his last match on 7 October 2017, when his assistant at Køge Nord FC, Kim Hansen, temporarily secured the manager role for the remaining part of the fall season until a new permanent manager could be found. Tommy Olsen was headhunted from the Denmark Series club Taastrup FC on a 1,5 year long manager contract, starting from 1 January 2018, while Kim Hansen continued as the assistant manager, but resigned on 26 May 2018. From the upcoming 2018/19-season, the manager position was filled by Carsten "Casser" Jensen.

== Crest and colours ==
The official emblem for all the departments of Rishøj IF was introduced in the first quarter of 1972, before the start of the 1972-season, when all the teams of the club were finally playing under the new club's name. It was drawn by Frede Hansen (a member of the football department), who sought to cover all present sport activities using an abstract design – the original version of the design included a circle between the letter "I" and the athlete's right leg, which has since been removed, and used a different fonttype. When the sport club's football department was dissolved and refounded as a separate club in the spring of 2004, a new simple circular crest was introduced featuring the club's new name, a shortened foundation year (04) and a ball associated with the only sport in the new club. A new name, logo and shirt for the club's first senior team was unveiled in the fall of 2016, but they did not officially put into use until 1 July 2017 – even though the players on the first team already began wearing the new logo on their shirts at the end of the 2016/17-season. While the club's logo was changed, the traditional home colours of blue and white were kept. The home playing kit have traditionally consisted of white shirts, blue shorts and blue socks up until the fall of 2016, when a design consisting of blue and white hooped tops with blue sleeves, blue shorts and blue and white hooped socks, resembling the typical home shirt of Queens Park Rangers F.C., was adopted.

Logos used in the history of the association football department/club:

Rishøj Idrætsforening
(1972–2004)

Rishøj Boldklub
(2004–30 June 2017)

Køge Nord FC
(1 July 2017–present)

== Head coach history ==
The person responsible for direction of the first senior team has traditionally been given the title of head coach/trainer. Between 1 January 2012 and 1 July 2014, Jesper "Købmand" Pedersen was given the title of manager/sports director with the primary responsibility for e.g. tactical match team composition, playing strategy and training planning, while Jimmy Brinksby (1 January 2012 — 30 June 2013) and Thomas Skov (1 July 2013 — 30 June 2014) were given the title of first senior team coach/trainer and second in line under the manager.

Name	Nationality	From	To	Refs
Kjeld Lauritzen (Note: Playing head coach/trainer.)	Denmark	~1973	~1973	
Egon Warny	Denmark	~1984	31 December 1985	
Arne Nielsen	Denmark	199?	199?	
Torben Nielsen	Denmark	200?	200?	
Kai Larsen	Denmark	200?	200?	
Lars Frisch	Denmark	2005?	30 June 2008	
Jesper "Købmand" Pedersen	Denmark	1 July 2008; 1 January 2012	31 December 2011; 30 June 2014	
Jimmy Brinksby	Denmark	1 January 2012	30 June 2013	
Thomas Skov	Denmark	1 July 2013; 1 July 2014	30 June 2014; 30 June 2015	
Martin Jungsgaard	Denmark	1 July 2015	5 October 2015	
Thomas Skov (Note: Caretaker appointments.)	Denmark	8 October 2015	31 October 2015	
Lars Feist (Note: Extended sick leave during their tenure)	Denmark	1 January 2016	26 September 2016	
Tom Nielsen	Denmark	15 March 2016	30 June 2016	
Morten Avnskjold and Dennis Danry	Denmark	26 September 2016	31 December 2016	
Jesper "Købmand" Pedersen	Denmark	1 January 2017	28 June 2017	
Morten Eskesen	Denmark	1 July 2017	7 October 2017	
Kim Hansen	Denmark	8 October 2017	31 December 2017	
Tommy Olsen	Denmark	1 January 2018	26 May 2018	
Carsten "Casser" Bruus Jensen	Denmark	1 July 2018	Present	

== Honours ==
=== Domestic ===
==== National leagues ====
- 2nd Division (DBU level 3)
  - Best league performance:
    Third place (2): 2012–13 (e), 2013–14 (w)

==== Regional leagues ====
- Zealand Series (DBUS level 1)
  - Runners-up (2): 2006, 2008–09
- Series 1 League Championship (DBUS level 2)
  - Winners (1): 1994
- Series 2 League Championship (DBUS level 3)
  - Winners (1): 1992

==== Cups ====
- DBU Pokalen
  - Best cup performance:
    Round of 16 (1): 2015–16

== Achievements ==
=== League summary ===
- 5 seasons in the Third Highest Danish League
- 3 seasons in the Fourth Highest Danish League

=== Statistical breakdown season-by-season ===
Season	League										Cup	Europe / Other		Avg. Home Attendance^{1}	Top goalscorer(s)^{1}		Refs
Season	Level	Division	P	W	D	L	F	A	Pts	Position	Cup	Competition	Result	Avg. Home Attendance^{1}	Name	Goals	Refs
1971	9	SBU Series 4, Group ?^{N}	—	—	—	—	—	—	—	—	—	—		—	—	—	
1972	9	SBU Series 4, Group 25^{R1}	22	—	—	—	85	36	35	2nd of 12; Lost promotion playoffs	—	—		—	—	—	
1973	9	SBU Series 4, Group ?^{R1}	—	—	—	—	—	—	—	1st of ?	—	Zealand Series 4 League Championship	QF	—	—	—	
1974	8	SBU Series 3, Group 14	22	—	—	—	50	55	20	6 of 12	—	—		—	—	—	
1975	8	SBU Series 3, Group 14	22	—	—	—	36	46	20	7 of 12	—	—		—	—	—	
1976	8	SBU Series 3, Group 14	22	—	—	—	46	44	19	8 of 12	—	—		—	—	—	
1977	9	SBU Series 4, Group ?	—	—	—	—	—	—	—	—	—	—		—	—	—	
1978	9	SBU Series 4, Group ?^{R1}	—	—	—	—	—	—	—	? of ?	—	—	—	—	—	—	
1979	8	SBU Series 3, Group 14	22	—	—	—	46	55	16	10 af 12	—	—		—	—	—	
1980	9	SBU Series 4, Group ?^{R1}	—	—	—	—	—	—	—	—	—	—		—	—	—	
1981	9	SBU Series 4, Group 24	—	—	—	—	—	—	—	?th of ?	—	—		—	—	—	
1982	10	SBU Series 5, Group ?^{R2}	—	—	—	—	—	—	—	—	—	—		—	—	—	
1983	10	SBU Series 5, Group ?	—	—	—	—	—	—	—	? of ? Lost promotion playoffs	—	—		—	—	—	
1984	10	SBU Series 5, Group ?^{R2}	—	—	—	—	—	—	—	? of ?	—	—	—	—	Michael Madsen	—	
1985	9	SBU Series 4, Group 25	22	—	—	—	33	49	18	10th of 12	—	—		—	—	—	
1986	10	SBU Series 5, Group ?	—	—	—	—	—	—	—	1st of ?	—	Zealand Series 5 League Championship	R1	—	—	—	
1987	9	SBU Series 4, Group 15	22	—	—	—	71	18	32	3rd of 12	—	—		—	—	—	
1988	9	SBU Series 4, Group 10	22	—	—	—	56	50	23	6th of 12	—	—		—	—	—	
1989	9	SBU Series 4, Group 9	22	—	—	—	—	—	—	? of 12	—	—		—	—	—	—
1990	9	SBU Series 4, Group 15^{R3}	22	—	—	—	90	28	40	1st of 12	—	Zealand Series 4 League Championship	R1	—	—	—	
1991	8	SBU Series 3, Group 5	22	—	—	—	74	36	31	2nd of 12	—	—		—	—	—	
1992	8→7	SBU Series 2, Group 4	22	—	—	—	54	26	33	1st of 12	—	Zealand Series 2 League Championship	W	—	—	—	
1993	7→6	SBU Series 1, Group 2	22	9	5	8	49	45	23	6th of 12	—	—		—	—	—	
1994	7→6	SBU Series 1, Group 2	22	—	—	—	61	28	31	1st of 12	—	Zealand Series 1 League Championship	W	—	—	—	
1995	6→5	Zealand Series	26	11	3	12	48	42	36	8th of 14	—	—		—	—	—	
1996	5	Zealand Series	26	4	4	18	37	70	16	13th of 14	R2	—		—	—	—	
1997	6	SBU Series 1, Group 2	22	8	5	9	40	40	29	7th of 12	—	—		—	—	—	
1998	7	SBU Series 1, Group 2	22	12	5	5	47	34	41	3rd of 12; Lost promotion playoffs	—	—		—	—	—	
1999	7	SBU Series 1, Group 2	22	9	5	8	44	40	32	6th of 12	—	—		—	—	—	
2000	7	SBU Series 1, Group 2	22	8	7	7	34	38	31	7th of 12	—	—		—	—	—	
2001	7	SBU Series 1, Group 2	22	10	4	8	61	41	34	6th of 12	—	—		—	—	—	
2002	7	SBU Series 1, Group 2	22	11	7	4	57	28	40	2nd of 12	QR3	—		—	—	—	
2003	6	Zealand Series	26	13	2	11	55	45	41	6th of 14	QR4	—		—	—	—	
2004	6	Zealand Series	26	11	3	12	55	52	36	6th of 14	QR5	—		—	—	—	
2005	6	Zealand Series	26	9	6	11	54	51	33	8th of 14	QR4	—		—	—	—	
2006	6	Zealand Series	24	13	7	4	54	26	46	2nd of 13	QR4	—		—	—	—	
2007 spring	5	Kvalifikationsrækken, Group 1	14	6	2	6	28	30	20	4th of 8	QR5	—		—	Jonas Bagger	7	
2007 fall	5	Kvalifikationsrækken, Group 1	14	5	2	7	33	34	17	6th of 8	QR5	—		—	Nikolaj Krag	12	
2008 spring	6	Zealand Series	13	8	1	4	28	20	25	4th of 14	R2	—		—	—	—	
2008–09	5	Zealand Series	26	15	7	4	52	34	52	2nd of 14	R2	—		—	—	—	
2009–10	4	Denmark Series, Group 2	26	16	4	6	72	37	52	3rd of 14	R3	—		—	Nikolaj Krag	14	
2010–11	3	2nd Division West	30	8	10	12	41	55	34	10th of 16	QR5	—		—	Dennis B. Schmidt	8	
2011–12	3	2nd Division East	30	13	8	9	49	40	47	4th of 16	R1	—		—	Anders Simonsen	8	
2012–13	3	2nd Division East	30	18	6	6	50	29	60	3rd of 16	R3	—		—	Dennis B. Schmidt	9	
2013–14	3	2nd Division West	30	15	8	7	57	40	53	3rd of 16	R1	—		—	Dennis B. Schmidt	12	
2014–15	3	2nd Division East	30	9	9	12	31	40	36	11th of 16; Lost relegation playoffs	R1	—		193	Dennis B. Schmidt	8	
2015–16	4	Denmark Series, Group 2	26	11	3	12	40	47	36	6th of 14	R4	—		—	Zia Wahidi	8	
2016–17	4	Denmark Series, Group 2	27	6	6	15	34	55	24	9th of 10	—	—		—	Morten Andersen	5	
2017–18	5	Zealand Series, Group 2	22	15	2	5	73	21	47	2nd of 12; Lost promotion playoffs	R1	—		—	—	—	
2018–19	5	Zealand Series, Group 2	—	—	—	—	—	—	—	—	QR5	—		—	—	—	—

^{1}: League games only, not including championship, promotion and relegation play-offs
^{N}: The remaining part of the new club's first season was played under the name Øslemagle IF Fodbold.
^{R1}: The first team (SBU Serie 4, kreds ?) and the reserve team (SBU Serie 4, kreds ?) played at the same league level. In 1980, the reserve team played in SBU Serie 4, kreds 29.
^{R2}: The first team (SBU Serie 5, kreds ?) and the reserve team (SBU Serie 5, kreds ?) played at the same league level
^{R3}: The first team (SBU Serie 4, kreds 15) and the reserve team (SBU Serie 4, kreds 14) played at the same league level
