= 2009–10 Danish Cup =

DBU Pokalen (The DBU Cup)

Tournament details
- Country: Denmark

Final positions
- Champions: FC Nordsjælland
- Runners-up: FC Midtjylland

The 2009–10 Danish Cup was the 56th season of the Danish football cup competition. For the second year, the sponsor of the competition was Ekstra Bladet, a daily newspaper, who signed a 3-year contract with the Danish Football Association (DBU) in 2008, making the official name Ekstra Bladet Cup 2009–10.

The competition opened on 8 August 2009 with the first round and concluded on 13 May 2010 with the final, held at Parken Stadium.

== First round ==
In this round entered 95 teams. Due to the odd number of clubs, one club, FC Fyn, received a bye to the Second Round. There were 47 matches in the First Round, taking place between 8–19 August 2009.

8 August 2009	Nexø	0–3	Elite 3000 Helsingør	Nexø
15:30 UTC+2		Report		Stadium: Nexø Stadion; Referee: Brian Andersen

10 August 2009	LSF	0–1	Avedøre	Ledøje-Smørum
18:30 UTC+2		Report		Stadium: Ledøje Idrætscenter; Referee: Niels Christian Jørgensen

11 August 2009	Marstal/Rise	DNP	Stensballe	Marstal
17:30 UTC+2		Report	(forfeit)	Stadium: Marstal Stadion

11 August 2009	Tuse	3–4	Lejre	Tuse
18:30 UTC+2		Report		Stadium: Tusehallen; Referee: Morten Christoffersen

11 August 2009	Marienlyst	4–5	Varde	Odense
18:30 UTC+2		Report		Stadium: Marienlystcentret; Referee: Hans-Henrik Høite Hansen

11 August 2009	Aalborg Chang	1–0	Tårs/Ugilt	Aalborg
18:30 UTC+2		Report		Stadium: Chang's Baner; Referee: Jan Rosa

11 August 2009	Bjerringbro	0–6	Aarhus Fremad	Bjerringbro
18:30 UTC+2		Report		Stadium: Bjerringbro Idrætspark; Referee: Michael Tykgaard

11 August 2009	Skovbakken	0–2	Brabrand	Aarhus
18:30 UTC+2		Report		Stadium: Vejlby/Risskov Centret; Referee: Casper Kristensen

11 August 2009	NUBI	1–2	Blokhus	Nørresundby
18:30 UTC+2		Report		Stadium: NUBI's Stadion; Referee: Rasmus Møller Bøjer

11 August 2009	Østerbro	0–3	Værløse	Copenhagen
18:30 UTC+2		Report		Stadium: Fælledparken; Referee: Niels Christian Jørgensen

11 August 2009	B. 1973 Herlev	1–5	Brønshøj	Herlev
18:30 UTC+2		Report		Stadium: Elverroad; Referee: Kenneth Egeberg

11 August 2009	FA 2000	0–2	Allerød	Frederiksberg
18:30 UTC+2		Report		Stadium: Jens Jessensvej; Referee: Peter Feigh

12 August 2009	Hjørring	3–2	Skive	Hjørring
18:00 UTC+2		Report		Stadium: Hjørring Stadion; Referee: Chris Johansen

12 August 2009	Hirtshals	0–3	Viborg	Hirtshals
18:30 UTC+2		Report		Stadium: Hirtshals Stadion; Referee: Morten Sevelsted Nielsen

12 August 2009	Næsby	0–2	Vejle	Odense
18:30 UTC+2		Report		Stadium: Næsby Stadion; Referee: Benjamin Helm Svedborg

12 August 2009	Nors	0–7	Thisted	Nors
18:30 UTC+2		Report		Stadium: Nors Stadion; Referee: Jakob Mastrup

12 August 2009	Sædding/Guldager	2–3	Otterup B&IK	Esbjerg
18:30 UTC+2		Report		Stadium: Guldager Idrætscenter; Referee: Jens Madsen

12 August 2009	Viby	1–3	Holstebro	Viby J
18:30 UTC+2		Report		Stadium: Viby Idrætspark; Referee: Brian Nielsen

12 August 2009	Stenløse	3–2	Hvidovre	Stenløse
18:30 UTC+2		Report		Stadium: Stenløse Stadion; Referee: Henrik Priegel

12 August 2009	Skovlunde	1–2	Hellerup	Ballerup
18:30 UTC+2		Report		Stadium: Ballerup Idrætspark; Referee: Martin Olsgaard

12 August 2009	Frederiksberg Boldklub	3–2	Virum-Sorgenfri	Frederiksberg
18:30 UTC+2		Report		Stadium: Frederiksberg I P Opvisning; Referee: Kim Werge Lundberg

12 August 2009	Ringsted	3–2	Nakskov	Ringsted
18:30 UTC+2		Report		Stadium: Ringsted Stadion; Referee: Elvir Hadzidulbic

12 August 2009	B 1908	6–5	Roskilde	Copenhagen
18:30 UTC+2		Report		Stadium: Sundby Idrætspark; Referee: Anders Poulsen

12 August 2009	Gladsaxe-Hero	0–2	Skjold	Søborg
18:30 UTC+2		Report		Stadium: Gladsaxe Stadium; Referee: Christian Brixen

12 August 2009	Lolland-Falster Alliancen	2–1	Næstved	Nykøbing Falster
19:00 UTC+2		Report		Stadium: Scandic Live Arena; Referee: Emil Laursen

12 August 2009	Glostrup	0–1	Frem	Glostrup
19:00 UTC+2		Report		Stadium: Glostrup Idrætspark; Referee: Darko Haramija

13 August 2009	Søllerød-Vedbæk	DNP	Egedal	Vedbæk
18:30 UTC+2		Report	(forfeit)	Stadium: Vedbæk Stadion

13 August 2009	DMI	1–4	Vestsjælland	Nysted
18:30 UTC+2		Report		Stadium: DMI's anlæg Referee: Brian Lindorf Hansen

13 August 2009	AIK 65 Strøby	5–1	Frem Sakskøbing	Stevns
18:30 UTC+2		Report		Stadium: Strøbyhallen; Referee: Jonas Hansen

13 August 2009	Tommerup	0–6	Kolding	Tommerup
18:30 UTC+2		Report		Stadium: Tommerup Stadion; Referee: Claus Bo Larsen

13 August 2009	Assens	4–3	Fjordager	Assens
18:30 UTC+2		Report		Stadium: Assens Stadion; Referee: Tom Krøyer

13 August 2009	B.73 Slagelse	1–3	Rishøj	Slagelse
18:30 UTC+2		Report		Stadium: Stadion Vest; Referee: Kenneth Sørensen

13 August 2009	Ringkøbing	1–2	Odder	Ringkøbing
18:30 UTC+2		Report		Stadium: Alkjær Stadion; Referee: Jens Ø. Poulsen

13 August 2009	Christiansbjerg	0–1	Grenaa	Aarhus
18:30 UTC+2		Report		Stadium: CIF's Anlæg; Referee: Rasmus Just

13 August 2009	HA85 Silkeborg	1–7	Horsens	Silkeborg
18:30 UTC+2		Report		Stadium: Hvinningdal Skole; Referee: Dennis Mogensen

13 August 2009	Svendborg	1–6	Fredericia	Svendborg
18:30 UTC+2		Report		Stadium: Høje Bøge Stadion; Referee: Peter Rasmussen

13 August 2009	Darum	0–3	Aabenraa	Darum
18:30 UTC+2		Report		Stadium: Darum Fritidscenter; Referee: Allan Staal

13 August 2009	Hadsund	3–4	Hobro	Hadsund
18:30 UTC+2		Report		Stadium: Hadsund Stadion; Referee: Lars Halskov

13 August 2009	Campus	0–1	Vejen	Odense M
18:30 UTC+2		Report		Stadium: Rosengårdsskolen; Referee: Mathias Bjørnø

13 August 2009	Tved	5–3	Vinding	Svendborg
18:30 UTC+2		Report		Stadium: Tved Stadion; Referee: Paw Johansen

13 August 2009	Bruunshåb/Tapdrup	1–5	Lindholm	Viborg
18:30 UTC+2		Report		Stadium: Bruunshåb/Tapdrup Stadion; Referee: Kristian Brødløs

13 August 2009	Husum	1–11	Avarta	Brønshøj
18:30 UTC+2		Report		Stadium: Husumparken; Referee: Lars Skibild Jensen

13 August 2009	Vanløse	0–1	Lyngby	Vanløse
18:30 UTC+2		Report		Stadium: Vanløse IP. Opvisn; Referee: Henrik Priegel

13 August 2009	Greve	2–1	B.93	Greve
18:30 UTC+2		Report		Stadium: Greve Idræts Center; Referee: Michael Schlander

13 August 2009	Valby	2–4	Svebølle	Valby
18:30 UTC+2		Report		Stadium: Værkstedsvej; Referee: Kenneth Egeberg

13 August 2009	Tårnby FF	2–0	AB Tårnby	Kastrup
19:30 UTC+2		Report		Stadium: Tårnby Stadion; Referee: Malthe Kringelbach Iversen

19 August 2009	Føroyar	0–3	AB	Søborg
18:30 UTC+2		Report		Stadium: Gladsaxe Stadion; Referee: Darko Haramija

== Second round ==
The clubs who placed 5–10 in the 2008–09 Superliga – Randers, AGF, AaB, Nordsjælland, Esbjerg, SønderjyskE – as well as the top two clubs from the 2008–09 First Division – Herfølge, who was merged with another club to form Køge for the 2009–10 season, and Silkeborg – received a bye into the second round.

26 August 2009	Viborg	1–0	AGF	Viborg
18:00 UTC+2		Report		Stadium: Viborg Stadion; Referee: Henrik Nystrup Kragh

26 August 2009	Aabenraa	0–2	Brabrand	Aabenraa
18:00 UTC+2		Report		Stadium: Aabenraa Stadion; Referee: Michael Tykgaard

26 August 2009	Hobro	2–1	Kolding	Hobro
18:00 UTC+2		Report		Stadium: Hobro Stadion; Referee: Andreas Knudsen

26 August 2009	Tved	1–0	Odder	Svendborg
18:00 UTC+2		Report		Stadium: Tved Stadion; Referee: Tom Krøyer

26 August 2009	Lindholm	1–5	Blokhus	Nørresundby
18:00 UTC+2		Report		Stadium: Lindholm Høje Stadion; Referee: Lars Halskov

26 August 2009	Assens	1–5	Fredericia	Assens
18:00 UTC+2		Report		Stadium: Assens Stadion; Referee: Kent Bøgelund

26 August 2009	Vejen	3–2	Varde	Vejen
18:00 UTC+2		Report		Stadium: Vejen Stadion; Referee: Peter Kjærsgaard-Andersen

26 August 2009	Djursland	3–4	Aarhus Fremad	Grenaa
18:00 UTC+2		Report		Stadium: Grenå Stadion; Referee: Hans-Henrik Høite Hansen

26 August 2009	Aalborg Chang	1–3	Marstal/Rise	Aalborg
18:00 UTC+2		Report		Stadium: Chang's Baner; Referee: Henrik Mortensen

26 August 2009	Ringsted	0–9	Nordsjælland	Ringsted
18:00 UTC+2		Report		Stadium: Ringsted Stadion; Referee: Darko Haramija

26 August 2009	Greve	3–4	SønderjyskE	Greve
18:00 UTC+2		Report		Stadium: Greve Idræts Center; Referee: Lars Christoffersen

26 August 2009	Vestsjælland	1–2	Esbjerg	Slagelse
18:00 UTC+2		Report		Stadium: Slagelse Stadion; Referee: Kenn Hansen

26 August 2009	Svebølle	1–2	Allerød	Svebølle
18:00 UTC+2		Report		Stadium: Svebølle Stadion; Referee: Thomas Dahl Strandberg

26 August 2009	Elite 3000 Helsingør	3–1	Skjold	Helsingør
18:00 UTC+2		Report		Stadium: Helsingør Stadion; Referee: Johnnie Espersen

26 August 2009	B 1908	1–5	Brønshøj	Copenhagen
18:00 UTC+2		Report		Stadium: Sundby Idrætspark; Referee: Bjarne Nigaard

26 August 2009	Rishøj	2–0	Stenløse	Køge
18:00 UTC+2		Report		Stadium: Rishøj Stadion; Referee: Benjamin Helm Svedborg

26 August 2009	Værløse	1–3	Frederiksberg	Værløse
18:00 UTC+2		Report		Stadium: Værløse Stadion; Referee: Malthe Kringelbach Iversen

26 August 2009	AIK 65 Strøby	3–2	Avedøre	Stevns
18:00 UTC+2		Report		Stadium: Strøbyhallen; Referee: Kenneth Sørensen

26 August 2009	Tårnby FF	1–0	Avarta	Kastrup
18:00 UTC+2		Report		Stadium: Tårnby Stadion; Referee: Thomas Kurt Nielsen

26 August 2009	Søllerød-Vedbæk	0–3	AB	Vedbæk
18:00 UTC+2		Report		Stadium: Vedbæk Stadion; Referee: Christian Brixen

26 August 2009	Lolland-Falster Alliancen	1–2	Lyngby	Nykøbing Falster
19:00 UTC+2		Report		Stadium: Scandic Live Arena; Referee: Lars Skibild Jensen

26 August 2009	Frem	0–3	HB Køge	Copenhagen
19:00 UTC+2		Report	Leliūga 15'; Nielsen 26'; Ake 71'	Stadium: Valby Idrætspark; Referee: Anders Clement-Hermansen

26 August 2009	Holstebro	3–5	Thisted	Holstebro
19:00 UTC+2		Report		Stadium: Holstebro Idrætspark; Referee: Ole Kronlykke

26 August 2009	Horsens	0–1	Vejle	Horsens
19:00 UTC+2		Report		Stadium: CASA Arena Horsens; Referee: Michael Svendsen

26 August 2009	Hjørring	0–2	Silkeborg	Hjørring
19:00 UTC+2		Report		Stadium: Hjørring Stadion; Referee: Rasmus Møller Bøjer

26 August 2009	Fyn	1–3	AaB	Odense
19:00 UTC+2	Jensen 79'	Report	Holm 4'; Kristensen 36'; Schwartz 84'	Stadium: Odense Atletik Stadion; Referee: Mads-Kristoffer Kristoffersen

2 September 2009	Lejre	1–4	Hellerup	Lejre
18:00 UTC+2		Report		Stadium: Lejrehallen; Referee: Anders Poulsen

9 September 2009	Otterup B&IK	0–5	Randers	Otterup
17:15 UTC+2		Report		Stadium: Otterup Stadion; Referee: Thomas Vejlgaard

== Third round ==
The top four teams from the 2008–09 Superliga – Copenhagen, OB, Brøndby, and Midtjylland – received a bye into the third round.

16 September 2009	Brønshøj	1–3	Midtjylland	Brønshøj
17:00 UTC+2		Report		Stadium: Tingbjerg Idrætspark; Referee: Lars Skibild Jensen

23 September 2009	Blokhus	0–2	Brøndby	Pandrup
16:00 UTC+2		Report		Stadium: Jetsmark Stadion; Referee: Michael Svendsen

23 September 2009	Tved	0–2	HB Køge	Svendborg
16:30 UTC+2		Report		Stadium: Tved Stadion; Referee: Kent Bøgelund

23 September 2009	Aarhus Fremad	3–4	Brabrand	Århus N
16:30 UTC+2		Report		Stadium: Riisvangen Stadion; Referee: Mads-Kristoffer Kristoffersen

23 September 2009	Rishøj	0–4	Viborg	Køge
16:30 UTC+2		Report		Stadium: Rishøj Stadion; Referee: Darko Haramija

23 September 2009	Frederiksberg	0–4	Vejle	Frederiksberg
16:30 UTC+2		Report		Stadium: Frederiksberg I P Opvisning; Referee: Brian Lindorf Hansen

23 September 2009	Allerød	0–2	Hobro	Allerød
16:30 UTC+2		Report		Stadium: Skovvang Stadion; Referee: Anders Poulsen

23 September 2009	AIK 65 Strøby	5–4	Tårnby FF	Stevns
16:30 UTC+2		Report		Stadium: Strøbyhallen; Referee: Thomas Dahl Strandberg

23 September 2009	Marstal/Rise	1–3	Silkeborg	Marstal
16:30 UTC+2		Report		Stadium: Marstal Stadion; Referee: Claus Bo Larsen

23 September 2009	Vejen	0–9	Randers	Vejen
16:30 UTC+2		Report		Stadium: Vejen Stadion; Referee: Jakob Kehlet

23 September 2009	Elite 3000 Helsingør	1–2	Copenhagen	Helsingør
18:00 UTC+2		Report		Stadium: Helsingør Stadion; Referee: Anders Hermansen

23 September 2009	AB	1–4	Nordsjælland	Søborg
19:00 UTC+2		Report		Stadium: Gladsaxe Stadion; Referee: Kenn Hansen

23 September 2009	Fredericia	3–5	OB	Fredericia
19:00 UTC+2		Report		Stadium: Monjasa Park; Referee: Nicolai Vollquartz

23 September 2009	Hellerup	2–4	SønderjyskE	Gentofte
19:00 UTC+2		Report		Stadium: Gentofte Stadion; Referee: Henrik Priegel

23 September 2009	Thisted	0–3	AaB	Thisted
19:00 UTC+2		Report		Stadium: Sparekassen Thy Arena; Referee: Henrik Nystrup Kragh

1 October 2009	Lyngby	1–2	Esbjerg	Lyngby
19:00 UTC+2	A. Sørensen 41'	Report	T. Janssen 76'; J. Jörgensen 85' (pen.)	Stadium: Lyngby Stadion; Referee: Emil Laursen

== Fourth round ==
The sixteen winners in Round 3 took part in Round 4. The draw occurred on 25 September 2009. The matches took place on 28 October 2009.

21 October 2009	Brabrand	0–2	HB Køge	Brabrand
15:00 UTC+2		Report		Stadium: Brabrand Stadion; Referee: Henning Jensen

21 October 2009	AIK 65 Strøby	1–5	Nordsjælland	Stevns
19:00 UTC+2		Report		Stadium: Strøbyhallen; Referee: Emil Laursen

27 October 2009	Randers	1–2	OB	Randers
20:00 UTC+2		Report		Stadium: Essex Park Randers; Referee: Jakob Kehlet

28 October 2009	Vejle	1–0	Brøndby	Vejle
18:00 UTC+2		Report		Stadium: Vejle Stadion; Referee: Nicolai Vollquartz

28 October 2009	Viborg	1–3	Silkeborg	Viborg
19:00 UTC+2		Report		Stadium: Viborg Stadion; Referee: Jens Maae

28 October 2009	Esbjerg	0–5	Midtjylland	Esbjerg
20:00 UTC+2		Report		Stadium: Blue Water Arena; Referee: Henrik Nystrup Kragh

29 October 2009	SønderjyskE	5–0	Copenhagen	Haderslev
18:00 UTC+2		Report		Stadium: Haderslev Fodboldstadion; Referee: Claus Bo Larsen

29 October 2009	Hobro	2–1	AaB	Hobro
20:00 UTC+2		Report		Stadium: Hobro Stadion; Referee: Michael Svendsen

== Quarter-finals ==
The draw for the Quarter-final round took place on 30 October 2009. Hobro IK from the Danish 2nd Division (3rd tier) is the lowest ranked team left at this stage.

8 April 2010	HB Køge	1–3	OB	Køge
16:00 CET		Report	H. Hansen 23'; Utaka 60', 81'	Stadium: SEAS-NVE Park

8 April 2010	Silkeborg	1–3 (a.e.t.)	Nordsjælland	Silkeborg
18:00 CET	S. Pedersen 43'	Report	Larsen 88' (o.g.); Granskov 105'; Stokholm 112'	Stadium: Silkeborg Stadion

8 April 2010	Vejle	2–1	SønderjyskE	Vejle
19:00 CET	Borre 55'; Nielsen 63'	Report	Frederiksen 6'	Stadium: Vejle Stadion

8 April 2010	Hobro	1–2	Midtjylland	Hobro
20:00 CET		Report	Collins 55', 59'	Stadium: Hobro Stadion

== Semi-finals ==
The sixth round, the semi-finals, are played as a two-legged tie. The legs were played on 21, 22, 28 and 29 April 2010.

Team 1	Agg.	Team 2	1st leg	2nd leg
Midtjylland	4–2	OB	2–0	2–2
Nordsjælland	4–0	Vejle	2–0	2–0

== Final ==
The final was played on 13 May.

13 May 2010
17:00 CEST

FC Nordsjælland	2–0 (a.e.t.)	FC Midtjylland
Stokholm 97'; Fetai 106'	Report

Parken, Copenhagen
Attendance: 18,856
Referee: Nicolai Vollquartz
