= 2021–22 West Ham United F.C. season =

English football team season

West Ham United
2021–22 season
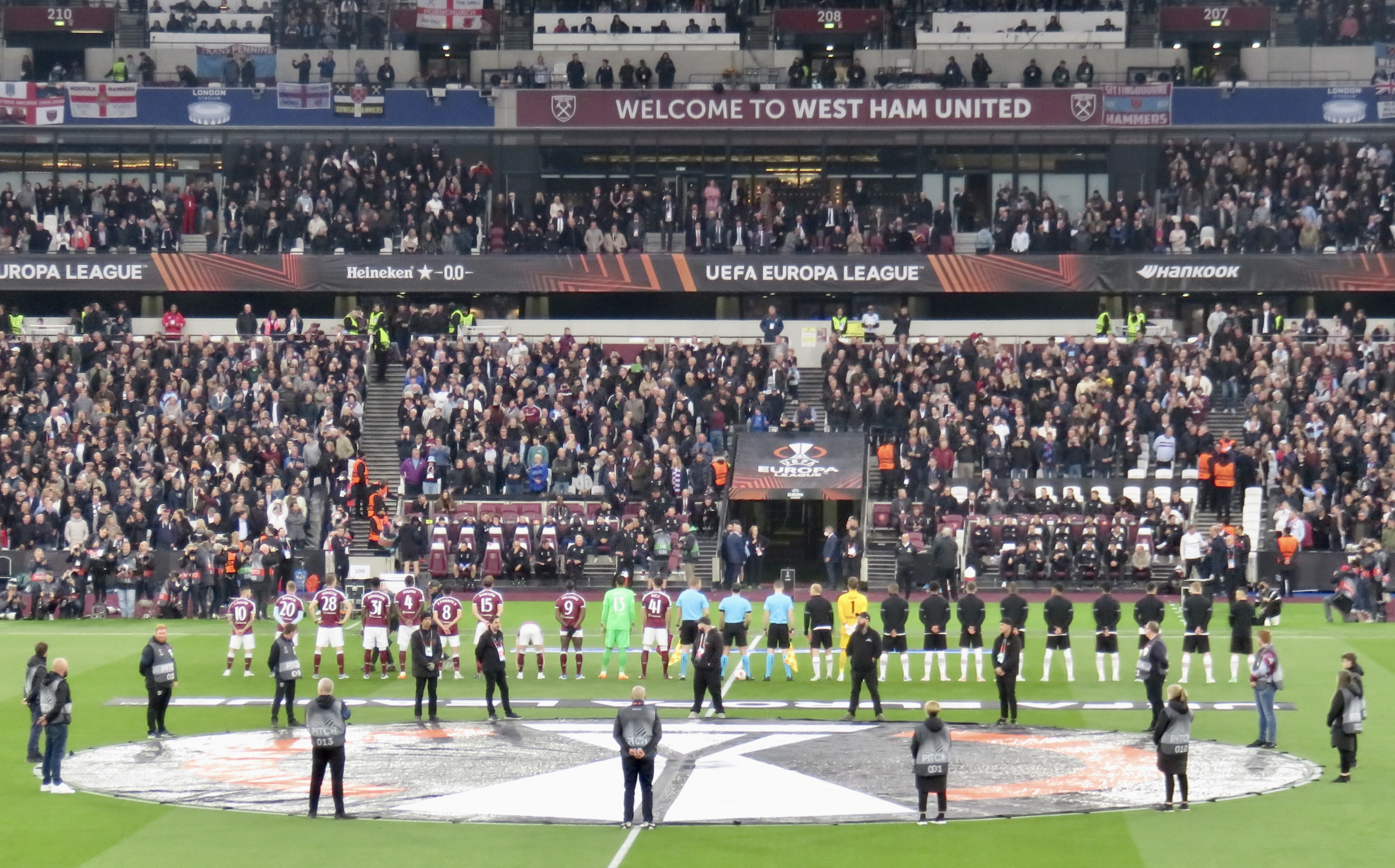
- West Ham line up at the London Stadium before their Europa League semi-final game against Eintracht Frankfurt
- Co-chairmen: David Sullivan, David Gold and Daniel Křetínský
- Manager: David Moyes
- Stadium: London Stadium
- Premier League: 7th
- FA Cup: Fifth round
- EFL Cup: Quarter-finals
- UEFA Europa League: Semi-finals
- Top goalscorer: League: Jarrod Bowen (12); All: Jarrod Bowen (18)
- Highest home attendance: 59,981 (vs Sevilla, 17 March 2022)
- Lowest home attendance: 41,027 (vs Southampton, 26 December 2021)
| Home colours | Away colours | Third colours |

The 2021–22 season was the 127th season in existence of West Ham United Football Club and the club's tenth consecutive season in the top flight of English football. In addition to the domestic league, West Ham United participated in this season's editions of the FA Cup, EFL Cup and UEFA Europa League.

== Squad ==
=== Season squad ===
| Squad no. | Player | Nationality | Position(s) | Date of birth (age) |
Goalkeepers
| 1 | Łukasz Fabiański | (Poland) | GK | 18 April 1985 (aged 37) |
| 13 | Alphonse Areola (on loan from Paris Saint-Germain) | (France) | GK | 27 February 1993 (aged 29) |
| 25 | David Martin | (England) | GK | 22 January 1986 (aged 36) |
| 35 | Darren Randolph | (Republic of Ireland) | GK | 12 May 1987 (aged 35) |
Defenders
| 3 | Aaron Cresswell | (England) | DF | 15 December 1989 (aged 32) |
| 4 | Kurt Zouma | (France) | DF | 27 October 1994 (aged 27) |
| 5 | Vladimír Coufal | (Czech Republic) | DF | 22 August 1992 (aged 29) |
| 15 | Craig Dawson | (England) | DF | 6 May 1990 (aged 32) |
| 21 | Angelo Ogbonna | (Italy) | DF | 23 May 1988 (aged 33) |
| 23 | Issa Diop | (France) | DF | 9 January 1997 (aged 25) |
| 24 | Ryan Fredericks | (England) | DF | 10 October 1992 (aged 29) |
| 26 | Arthur Masuaku | (Democratic Republic of the Congo) | DF | 7 November 1993 (aged 28) |
| 31 | Ben Johnson | (England) | DF | 24 January 2000 (aged 22) |
| 50 | Harrison Ashby | (Scotland) | DF | 14 November 2001 (aged 20) |
Midfielders
| 8 | Pablo Fornals | (Spain) | MF | 22 February 1996 (aged 26) |
| 10 | Manuel Lanzini | (Argentina) | MF | 15 February 1993 (aged 29) |
| 11 | Nikola Vlašić | (Croatia) | MF | 4 October 1997 (aged 24) |
| 16 | Mark Noble (C) | (England) | MF | 8 May 1987 (aged 35) |
| 28 | Tomáš Souček | (Czech Republic) | MF | 27 February 1995 (aged 27) |
| 33 | Alex Král (on loan from Spartak Moscow) | (Czech Republic) | MF | 19 May 1998 (aged 24) |
| 41 | Declan Rice | (England) | MF | 14 January 1999 (aged 23) |
Forwards
| 7 | Andriy Yarmolenko | (Ukraine) | FW | 23 October 1989 (aged 32) |
| 9 | Michail Antonio | (Jamaica) | FW | 28 March 1990 (aged 32) |
| 20 | Jarrod Bowen | (England) | FW | 20 December 1996 (aged 25) |
| 22 | Saïd Benrahma | (Algeria) | FW | 10 August 1995 (aged 26) |

Last updated: 22 May 2022.
Source: West Ham United F.C.

== Transfers ==
=== Transfers in ===
| Date | Position | Nationality | Player | From | Fee | Ref. |
|---|---|---|---|---|---|---|
| 9 June 2021 | CB | (England) | Craig Dawson | (England) Watford | £2,000,000 | |
| 9 June 2021 | DM | (France) | Pierre Ekwah | (England) Chelsea | Undisclosed | |
| 9 June 2021 | LW | (England) | Thierry Nevers | (England) Reading | Undisclosed | |
| 1 July 2021 | LW | (Republic of Ireland) | Armstrong Okoflex | (Scotland) Celtic | Free transfer | |
| 3 August 2021 | GK | (Scotland) | Brian Kinnear | (Scotland) Rangers | Free transfer | |
| 28 August 2021 | CB | (France) | Kurt Zouma | (England) Chelsea | £29,800,000 | |
| 31 August 2021 | AM | (Croatia) | Nikola Vlašić | (Russia) CSKA Moscow | £33,500,000 | |
| 4 January 2022 | CF | (Northern Ireland) | Callum Marshall | (Northern Ireland) Linfield | Undisclosed | |

=== Loaned in ===
| Date from | Position | Nationality | Player | From | Date until | Ref. |
|---|---|---|---|---|---|---|
| 29 July 2021 | GK | (France) | Alphonse Areola | (France) Paris Saint-Germain | End of season | |
| 31 August 2021 | DM | (Czech Republic) | Alex Král | (Russia) Spartak Moscow | End of season | |

=== Loaned out ===
| Date from | Position | Nationality | Player | To | Date until | Ref. |
|---|---|---|---|---|---|---|
| 1 July 2021 | GK | (Ghana) | Joseph Anang | (England) Stevenage | 4 January 2022 (Note: On 4 January, Anang was recalled back from his loan spell at Stevenage.) | |
| 22 July 2021 | GK | (England) | Nathan Trott | (France) Nancy | End of season | |
| 29 July 2021 | LW | (England) | Nathan Holland | (England) Oxford United | End of season | |
| 30 August 2021 | CF | (Republic of Ireland) | Mipo Odubeko | (England) Huddersfield Town | 4 January 2022 (Note: On 4 January, Odubeko was recalled back from his loan spell at Huddersfield Town.) | |
| 31 August 2021 | DM | (Republic of Ireland) | Conor Coventry | (England) Peterborough United | 5 January 2022 (Note: On 5 January, Coventry was recalled back from his loan spell at Peterborough United.) | |
| 18 January 2022 | DM | (Republic of Ireland) | Conor Coventry | (England) Milton Keynes Dons | End of season | |
| 20 January 2022 | CB | (Portugal) | Gonçalo Cardoso | (Spain) Real Betis | End of season | |
| 27 January 2022 | CF | (Republic of Ireland) | Mipo Odubeko | (England) Doncaster Rovers | End of season | |
| 28 January 2022 | GK | (Ghana) | Joseph Anang | (Republic of Ireland) St Patrick's Athletic | End of season | |

=== Transfers out ===
| Date | Position | Nationality | Player | To | Fee | Ref. |
|---|---|---|---|---|---|---|
| 27 May 2021 | LW | (England) | Oladapo Afolayan | (England) Bolton Wanderers | Free transfer | |
| 30 June 2021 | CF | (England) | Sean Adarkwa | (England) Queens Park Rangers | Released | |
| 30 June 2021 | CB | (England) | Tunji Akinola | (Scotland) Partick Thistle | Released | |
| 30 June 2021 | CB | (Paraguay) | Fabián Balbuena | (Russia) Dynamo Moscow | Released | |
| 30 June 2021 | CB | (England) | Sam Caiger | (England) Ware | Released | |
| 30 June 2021 | CM | (England) | Alfie Lewis | (Republic of Ireland) St Patrick's Athletic | Released | |
| 30 June 2021 | CB | (England) | Joshua Okotcha | (England) Hendon | Released | |
| 1 July 2021 | GK | (Nigeria) | Daniel Jinadu | (England) Barnsley | Free transfer | |
| 16 July 2021 | LW | (Brazil) | Felipe Anderson | (Italy) Lazio | Undisclosed | |
| 13 August 2021 | DF | (England) | Carlos Richards | (England) Derby County | Free transfer | |
| 31 August 2021 | RW | (Portugal) | Xande Silva | (England) Nottingham Forest | Undisclosed | |
| 21 September 2021 | CB | (New Zealand) | Winston Reid | Mutual consent | | |
| 31 January 2022 | CB | (Denmark) | Frederik Alves | (Denmark) Brøndby | Undisclosed | |

== Pre-season friendlies ==
As part of their pre-season preparations, West Ham United confirmed they would play friendly matches against Dundee, Leyton Orient, Northampton Town, Reading, Celtic, Brentford and Atalanta.

| 9 July 2021 Friendly | Dundee | 2–2 | West Ham United | Dundee, Scotland |
| 13:00 BST | Adam 14'; McMullan 53' | Report | Baptiste 61'; Bowen 67' (pen.) | Stadium: Dens Park; Attendance: 500 |

| 13 July 2021 Friendly | Leyton Orient | 0–0 | West Ham United | Leyton |
| 19:00 BST | | Report | | Stadium: Breyer Group Stadium; Referee: Gavin Ward |

| 13 July 2021 Friendly | Northampton Town | 1–2 | West Ham United | Northampton |
| 19:00 BST | Hoskins 29' | Report | Nelson 3' (o.g.); Coventry 13' | Stadium: PTS Academy Stadium; Attendance: 1,715; Referee: Andy Woolmer |

| 21 July 2021 Friendly | Reading | 0–3 | West Ham United | Reading |
| 19:00 BST | | Report | Dorsett 38' (o.g.); Coventry 57'; Johnson 77' | Stadium: Select Car Leasing Stadium; Attendance: 6,000; Referee: Tim Robinson |

| 24 July 2021 Friendly | Celtic | 2–6 | West Ham United | Parkhead, Scotland |
| 15:00 BST | McGregor 8'; Christie 50' | Report | Antonio 24', 32'; Noble 38' (pen.); Benrahma 54'; Bowen 74'; Oko-Flex 85' | Stadium: Celtic Park; Attendance: 18,500; Referee: John Beaton |

| 31 July 2021 Friendly | Brentford | 0–1 | West Ham United | Brentford |
| 15:00 BST | | Report | Benrahma 66' | Stadium: Brentford Community Stadium; Referee: Darren England |

| 7 August 2021 Betway Cup | West Ham United | 2–0 | Atalanta | Stratford |
| 15:00 BST | Antonio 45'; Fornals 89' | Report | Freuler (yellow card) 38' | Stadium: London Stadium; Attendance: 27,665; Referee: Stuart Attwell |

== Competitions ==
=== Overview ===
| Competition | First match | Last match | Starting round | Record | | | | | | | |
| Competition | First match | Last match | Starting round | Pld | W | D | L | GF | GA | GD | Win % |
|---|---|---|---|---|---|---|---|---|---|---|---|
| Premier League | 15 August 2021 | 22 May 2022 | Matchday 1 | 38 | 16 | 8 | 14 | 60 | 51 | +9 | 42.11 |
| FA Cup | 9 January 2022 | 2 March 2022 | Third round | 3 | 2 | 0 | 1 | 5 | 4 | +1 | 66.67 |
| EFL Cup | 22 September 2021 | 22 December 2021 | Third round | 3 | 1 | 1 | 1 | 1 | 1 | +0 | 33.33 |
| UEFA Europa League | 16 September 2021 | 5 May 2022 | Group stage | 12 | 6 | 2 | 4 | 18 | 8 | +10 | 50.00 |
| Total | | | | 56 | 25 | 11 | 20 | 84 | 64 | +20 | 44.64 |

Source: Soccerway

=== Premier League ===
==== League table ====
| Pos | Team | Pld | W | D | L | GF | GA | GD | Pts | Qualification or relegation |
|---|---|---|---|---|---|---|---|---|---|---|
| 5 | Arsenal | 38 | 22 | 3 | 13 | 61 | 48 | +13 | 69 | Qualification for the Europa League group stage (Note: Since the winners of the 2021–22 FA Cup and the 2021–22 EFL Cup, Liverpool, qualified for the Champions League, the spot given to the FA Cup winners (Europa League group stage) was passed to the sixth-placed team and the spot given to the League Cup winners (Europa Conference League play-off round) was passed to the seventh-placed team.) |
| 6 | Manchester United | 38 | 16 | 10 | 12 | 57 | 57 | 0 | 58 | Qualification for the Europa League group stage |
| 7 | West Ham United | 38 | 16 | 8 | 14 | 60 | 51 | +9 | 56 | Qualification for the Europa Conference League play-off round |
| 8 | Leicester City | 38 | 14 | 10 | 14 | 62 | 59 | +3 | 52 | |
| 9 | Brighton & Hove Albion | 38 | 12 | 15 | 11 | 42 | 44 | −2 | 51 | |

Source: Premier League
Rules for classification: 1) Points; 2) Goal difference; 3) Goals scored; 4) If the champions, relegated teams or qualified teams for UEFA competitions cannot be determined by rules 1 to 3, rules 4.1 to 4.3 are applied – 4.1) Points gained in head-to-head record between such teams; 4.2) Away goals scored in head-to-head record between such teams; 4.3) Play-offs

==== Results summary ====
| Overall | | | | | | | | Home | | | | | | Away | | | | | |
| Pld | W | D | L | GF | GA | GD | Pts | W | D | L | GF | GA | GD | W | D | L | GF | GA | GD |
|---|---|---|---|---|---|---|---|---|---|---|---|---|---|---|---|---|---|---|---|
| 38 | 16 | 8 | 14 | 60 | 51 | +9 | 56 | 9 | 5 | 5 | 33 | 26 | +7 | 7 | 3 | 9 | 27 | 25 | +2 |

==== Results by matchday ====
| Matchday | 1 | 2 | 3 | 4 | 5 | 6 | 7 | 8 | 9 | 10 | 11 | 12 | 13 | 14 | 15 | 16 | 17 | 18 | 19 | 20 | 21 | 22 | 23 | 24 | 25 | 26 | 27 | 28 | 29 | 30 | 31 | 32 | 33 | 34 | 35 | 36 | 37 | 38 |
|---|---|---|---|---|---|---|---|---|---|---|---|---|---|---|---|---|---|---|---|---|---|---|---|---|---|---|---|---|---|---|---|---|---|---|---|---|---|---|
| Ground | A | H | H | A | H | A | H | A | H | A | H | A | A | H | H | A | A | H | A | A | H | H | A | H | A | H | H | A | H | A | H | A | H | A | H | A | H | A |
| Result | W | W | D | D | L | W | L | W | W | W | W | L | L | D | W | D | L | L | W | W | W | L | L | W | D | D | W | L | W | L | W | L | D | L | L | W | D | L |
| Position | 4 | 1 | 2 | 8 | 8 | 7 | 9 | 7 | 4 | 4 | 3 | 4 | 4 | 4 | 4 | 4 | 5 | 6 | 5 | 5 | 4 | 4 | 5 | 4 | 5 | 5 | 5 | 6 | 6 | 7 | 6 | 6 | 7 | 7 | 7 | 7 | 7 | 7 |

Source: Premier League
W = Win; D = Draw; L = Loss

==== Matches ====
The league fixtures were revealed on 16 June 2021.

| 15 August 2021 1 | Newcastle United | 2–4 | West Ham United | Newcastle upon Tyne |
| 14:00 BST | Wilson 5'; Murphy 40'; Shelvey (yellow card) 51' | Report | Cresswell 18'; Benrahma 53'; Souček 63'; Antonio 66' | Stadium: St James' Park; Attendance: 50,673; Referee: Martin Atkinson |

| 23 August 2021 2 | West Ham United | 4–1 | Leicester City | Stratford |
| 20:00 BST | Fornals 26'; Benrahma 56'; Antonio 80', 84' | Report | Pérez (red card) 40'; Tielemans 69'; Pereira (yellow card) 71' | Stadium: London Stadium; Attendance: 59,901; Referee: Michael Oliver |

| 28 August 2021 3 | West Ham United | 2–2 | Crystal Palace | Stratford |
| 15:00 BST | Fornals 39'; Antonio 68'; Rice (yellow card) 90+1' | Report | Gallagher 58', 70' | Stadium: London Stadium; Attendance: 59,751; Referee: Stuart Attwell |

| 11 September 2021 4 | Southampton | 0–0 | West Ham United | Southampton |
| 15:00 BST | Romeu (yellow card) 13'; Stephens (yellow card) 71'; Salisu (yellow card) 90+2' | Report | Antonio (yellow card) 71' (yellow-red card) 90+5'; Rice (yellow card) 73' | Stadium: St Mary's Stadium; Attendance: 27,861; Referee: David Coote |

| 19 September 2021 5 | West Ham United | 1–2 | Manchester United | Stratford |
| 14:00 BST | Benrahma 30'; Noble (penalty missed) 90+5 | Report | Ronaldo 35'; Lingard 89' | Stadium: London Stadium; Attendance: 59,958; Referee: Martin Atkinson |

| 25 September 2021 6 | Leeds United | 1–2 | West Ham United | Leeds |
| 15:00 BST | Raphinha 19', (yellow card) 20'; Meslier (yellow card) 70'; Roberts (yellow card) 81' | Report | Fornals (yellow card) 28'; Antonio (yellow card) 55', (goal) 90'; Firpo 67' (o.g.) | Stadium: Elland Road; Attendance: 36,417; Referee: Kevin Friend |

| 3 October 2021 7 | West Ham United | 1–2 | Brentford | Stratford |
| 14:00 BST | Zouma (yellow card) 35'; Bowen 80'; Rice (yellow card) 90+2' | Report | Mbeumo 20'; Nørgaard (yellow card) 69'; Canós (yellow card) 84'; Jørgensen (yellow card) 85'; Wissa 90+4' | Stadium: London Stadium; Attendance: 49,940; Referee: Peter Bankes |

| 17 October 2021 8 | Everton | 0–1 | West Ham United | Liverpool |
| 14:00 BST | | Report | Antonio (yellow card) 10'; Fornals (yellow card) 31'; Ogbonna 74' | Stadium: Goodison Park; Attendance: 39,132; Referee: Stuart Attwell |

| 24 October 2021 9 | West Ham United | 1–0 | Tottenham Hotspur | Stratford |
| 14:00 BST | Souček (yellow card) 21'; Ogbonna (yellow card) 37'; Antonio 72' | Report | Romero (yellow card) 60' | Stadium: London Stadium; Attendance: 59,924; Referee: Paul Tierney |

| 31 October 2021 10 | Aston Villa | 1–4 | West Ham United | Birmingham |
| 16:30 BST | Watkins 34'; Konsa (red card) 50'; McGinn (yellow card) 79' | Report | Johnson 7'; Rice 38'; Fornals (yellow card) 79', (goal) 80'; Bowen (yellow card) 79', (goal) 84' | Stadium: Villa Park; Attendance: 41,874; Referee: Chris Kavanagh |

| 7 November 2021 11 | West Ham United | 3–2 | Liverpool | Stratford |
| 16:30 GMT | Alisson 4' (o.g.); Souček (yellow card) 45+7'; Fornals 67'; Zouma 74' | Report | Alexander-Arnold 41', (yellow card) 55'; Origi 83' | Stadium: London Stadium; Attendance: 59,909; Referee: Craig Pawson |

| 20 November 2021 12 | Wolverhampton Wanderers | 1–0 | West Ham United | Wolverhampton |
| 15:00 GMT | Neves (yellow card) 54'; Jiménez 58' | Report | Rice (yellow card) 86' | Stadium: Molineux; Attendance: 30,667; Referee: Mike Dean |

| 28 November 2021 13 | Manchester City | 2–1 | West Ham United | Manchester |
| 14:00 GMT | Laporte (yellow card) 29'; Gündoğan 33'; Cancelo (yellow card) 61'; Fernandinho 90' | Report | Lanzini 90+4' | Stadium: Etihad Stadium; Attendance: 53,245; Referee: Michael Oliver |

| 1 December 2021 14 | West Ham United | 1–1 | Brighton & Hove Albion | Stratford |
| 19:30 GMT | Souček 5'; Antonio (yellow card) 90+6' | Report | Maupay 89', (yellow card) 90' | Stadium: London Stadium; Attendance: 59,626; Referee: Chris Kavanagh |

| 4 December 2021 15 | West Ham United | 3–2 | Chelsea | Stratford |
| 12:30 GMT | Lanzini 40' (pen.); Bowen 56'; Masuaku 87'; Coufal (yellow card) 90+1' | Report | Jorginho (yellow card) 23'; Thiago Silva 28'; Mount 44'; James (yellow card) 90+2'; Christensen (yellow card) 90+4' | Stadium: London Stadium; Attendance: 59,942; Referee: Andre Marriner |

| 12 December 2021 16 | Burnley | 0–0 | West Ham United | Burnley |
| 14:00 GMT | Taylor (yellow card) 33'; Mee (yellow card) 45+3' | Report | Dawson (yellow card) 90+3' | Stadium: Turf Moor; Attendance: 18,065; Referee: Graham Scott |

| 15 December 2021 17 | Arsenal | 2–0 | West Ham United | Holloway |
| 20:00 GMT | Martinelli 48', (yellow card) 58'; Lacazette (penalty missed) 69'; Ramsdale (yellow card) 72'; Smith Rowe 87' | Report | Coufal (yellow card) 11' (yellow-red card) 66' | Stadium: Emirates Stadium; Attendance: 59,777; Referee: Anthony Taylor |

| 26 December 2021 18 | West Ham United | 2–3 | Southampton | Stratford |
| 15:00 GMT | Rice (yellow card) 34'; Antonio 49'; Benrahma 64'; Bowen (yellow card) 68' | Report | Elyounoussi 8'; Ward-Prowse 61' (pen.); Broja (yellow card) 66'; Bednarek 70', (yellow card) 85'; Walker-Peters (yellow card) 90+6' | Stadium: London Stadium; Attendance: 41,027; Referee: Kevin Friend |

| 28 December 2021 19 | Watford | 1–4 | West Ham United | Watford |
| 15:00 GMT | Dennis 4' | Report | Souček 27'; Benrahma 29'; Noble 58' (pen.); Dawson (yellow card) 81'; Vlašić 90+2' | Stadium: Vicarage Road; Attendance: 20,073; Referee: Darren England |

| 1 January 2022 20 | Crystal Palace | 2–3 | West Ham United | Selhurst |
| 17:30 GMT | Édouard 83'; Olise 90' | Report | Antonio 22'; Lanzini 25', 45+5' (pen.); Johnson (yellow card) 38'; Masuaku (yellow card) 78' | Stadium: Selhurst Park; Attendance: 24,351; Referee: Darren England |

| 12 January 2022 21 | West Ham United | 2–0 | Norwich City | Stratford |
| 19:45 GMT | Bowen 42', 85' | Report | | Stadium: London Stadium; Attendance: 59,775; Referee: Simon Hooper |

| 16 January 2022 22 | West Ham United | 2–3 | Leeds United | Stratford |
| 14:00 GMT | Antonio (yellow card) 24'; Bowen 34'; Fornals 52'; Lanzini (yellow card) 62'; Yarmolenko (yellow card) 77' | Report | Harrison 10', 37', 60'; Koch (yellow card) 45'; James (yellow card) 89' | Stadium: London Stadium; Attendance: 59,951; Referee: Mike Dean |

| 22 January 2022 23 | Manchester United | 1–0 | West Ham United | Manchester |
| 15:00 GMT | Maguire (yellow card) 56'; Rashford 90+3' | Report | Rice (yellow card) 63' | Stadium: Old Trafford; Attendance: 73,130; Referee: Jonathan Moss |

| 8 February 2022 24 | West Ham United | 1–0 | Watford | Stratford |
| 19:45 GMT | Bowen 68'; Coufal (yellow card) 83' | Report | | Stadium: London Stadium; Attendance: 59,581; Referee: Martin Atkinson |

| 13 February 2022 25 | Leicester City | 2–2 | West Ham United | Leicester |
| 16:30 GMT | Pereira (yellow card) 18', (goal) 57'; Tielemans 45' (pen.) | Report | Bowen 10'; Cresswell (yellow card) 60'; Rice (yellow card) 61'; Dawson 90+1' | Stadium: King Power Stadium; Attendance: 32,061; Referee: Michael Oliver |

| 19 February 2022 26 | West Ham United | 1–1 | Newcastle United | Stratford |
| 12:30 GMT | Fredericks (yellow card) 21'; Dawson 32'; Fornals (yellow card) 90'; Bowen (yellow card) 90+5' | Report | Krafth (yellow card) 31'; Willock 45+1'; Fraser (yellow card) 76'; Burn (yellow card) 90+5' | Stadium: London Stadium; Attendance: 59,949; Referee: Chris Kavanagh |

| 27 February 2022 27 | West Ham United | 1–0 | Wolverhampton Wanderers | Stratford |
| 14:00 GMT | Souček 59'; Antonio (yellow card) 82' | Report | | Stadium: London Stadium; Attendance: 59,946; Referee: Anthony Taylor |

| 5 March 2022 28 | Liverpool | 1–0 | West Ham United | Liverpool |
| 17:30 GMT | Mané 27', (yellow card) 90+5'; Jota (yellow card) 89' | Report | Dawson (yellow card) 31' | Stadium: Anfield; Attendance: 53,059; Referee: Jonathan Moss |

| 13 March 2022 29 | West Ham United | 2–1 | Aston Villa | Stratford |
| 14:00 GMT | Lanzini (yellow card) 44'; Yarmolenko 70'; Fornals 82' | Report | Ramsey 90' | Stadium: London Stadium; Attendance: 59,957; Referee: Jarred Gillett |

| 20 March 2022 30 | Tottenham Hotspur | 3–1 | West Ham United | Tottenham |
| 16:30 GMT | Zouma 9' (o.g.); Son 24', 88' | Report | Dawson (yellow card) 23'; Benrahma 35' | Stadium: Tottenham Hotspur Stadium; Attendance: 58,685; Referee: Anthony Taylor |

| 3 April 2022 31 | West Ham United | 2–1 | Everton | Stratford |
| 14:00 BST | Cresswell 32', (yellow card) 90+4'; Bowen 58' | Report | Keane (yellow card) 34' (yellow-red card) 65'; Holgate 53', (yellow card) 84' | Stadium: London Stadium; Attendance: 59,953; Referee: Michael Oliver |

| 10 April 2022 32 | Brentford | 2–0 | West Ham United | Brentford |
| 14:00 BST | Mbeumo 48'; Toney 64' | Report | Antonio (yellow card) 66' | Stadium: Brentford Community Stadium; Attendance: 17,032; Referee: Martin Atkinson |

| 17 April 2022 33 | West Ham United | 1–1 | Burnley | Stratford |
| 14:15 BST | Fabiański (yellow card) 45'; Rice (yellow card) 67'; Souček 74' | Report | Cork (yellow card) 11'; Weghorst 33', (yellow card) 67'; Cornet (penalty missed) 45+1' | Stadium: London Stadium; Attendance: 59,958; Referee: Paul Tierney |

| 24 April 2022 34 | Chelsea | 1–0 | West Ham United | Fulham |
| 14:00 BST | Alonso (yellow card) 82'; Jorginho (penalty missed) 87'; Pulisic 90' | Report | Dawson (red card) 86' | Stadium: Stamford Bridge; Attendance: 32,231; Referee: Michael Oliver |

| 1 May 2022 35 | West Ham United | 1–2 | Arsenal | Stratford |
| 16:30 BST | Bowen 45', (yellow card) 52'; Cresswell (yellow card) 90+2' | Report | Holding 38'; Saka (yellow card) 49'; Gabriel 54'; Nketiah (yellow card) 90' | Stadium: London Stadium; Attendance: 59,959; Referee: Mike Dean |

| 8 May 2022 36 | Norwich City | 0–4 | West Ham United | Norwich |
| 14:00 BST | Williams (yellow card) 61' | Report | Benrahma 12', 45+3'; Bowen (yellow card) 25'; Antonio 30'; Lanzini 65' (pen.) | Stadium: Carrow Road; Attendance: 26,428; Referee: Robert Jones |

| 15 May 2022 37 | West Ham United | 2–2 | Manchester City | Stratford |
| 14:00 BST | Bowen 24', 45', (yellow card) 32'; Coufal (yellow card) 58'; Fabiański (yellow card) 60' | Report | Grealish 49'; Coufal 69' (o.g.); Mahrez (penalty missed) 86'; Gabriel Jesus (yellow card) 90+4' | Stadium: London Stadium; Attendance: 59,972; Referee: Anthony Taylor |

| 22 May 2022 38 | Brighton & Hove Albion | 3–1 | West Ham United | Falmer |
| 16:00 BST | Veltman 50'; Groß 80'; Maupay (yellow card) 83'; Welbeck 90+2' | Report | Antonio 40'; Souček (yellow card) 42' | Stadium: American Express Community Stadium; Attendance: 31,604; Referee: Kevin Friend |

=== FA Cup ===
The Hammers were drawn at home to Leeds United in the third round and away to Kidderminster Harriers in the fourth round.

| 9 January 2022 Third round | West Ham United | 2–0 | Leeds United | Stratford |
| 14:00 GMT | Lanzini 34', (yellow card) 72'; Bowen 90+3' | Report | Drameh (yellow card) 79' | Stadium: London Stadium; Attendance: 54,303; Referee: Stuart Attwell |

| 5 February 2022 Fourth round | Kidderminster Harriers | 1–2 (a.e.t.) | West Ham United | Kidderminster |
| 12:30 GMT | Penny 19'; Cameron (yellow card) 71' | Report | Rice 90+1'; Bowen 120+1' | Stadium: Aggborough Stadium; Attendance: 5,327; Referee: Jonathan Moss |

| 2 March 2022 Fifth round | Southampton | 3–1 | West Ham United | Southampton |
| 19:30 GMT | Perraud 31', (yellow card) 85'; Ward-Prowse 69' (pen.); Diallo (yellow card) 87'; Broja 90+5' | Report | Antonio 60'; Dawson (yellow card) 68' | Stadium: St Mary's Stadium; Attendance: 28,383; Referee: Andre Marriner |

=== EFL Cup ===
Due to participation in UEFA competitions, the Hammers entered the competition in the third round and were drawn away to Manchester United and then Manchester City at home in the fourth round.

| 22 September 2021 Third round | Manchester United | 0–1 | West Ham United | Manchester |
| 19:45 BST | | Report | Lanzini 9'; Noble (yellow card) 57' | Stadium: Old Trafford; Attendance: 72,568; Referee: Jonathan Moss |
Note: Live on Sky Sports

| 27 October 2021 Fourth round | West Ham United | 0–0 (5–3 p) | Manchester City | Stratford |
| 19:45 BST | | Report | | Stadium: London Stadium; Attendance: 60,000; Referee: Jonathan Moss |
| | Penalties |
| | Noble (penalty scored); Bowen (penalty scored); Dawson (penalty scored); Cresswell (penalty scored); Benrahma (penalty scored) | | (penalty missed) Foden; (penalty scored) Cancelo; (penalty scored) Gabriel Jesus; (penalty scored) Grealish |

| 22 December 2021 Quarter-finals | Tottenham Hotspur | 2–1 | West Ham United | Tottenham |
| 19:45 GMT | Bergwijn 29'; Lucas 34' | Report | Bowen 32', (yellow card) 37' | Stadium: Tottenham Hotspur Stadium; Attendance: 40,031; Referee: Chris Kavanagh |

=== UEFA Europa League ===
==== Group stage ====
West Ham were drawn against Croatian side Dinamo Zagreb, Belgian side Genk and Austrian side Rapid Wien in the group stage, with the fixtures being released a day later.

| Pos | Team | Pld | W | D | L | GF | GA | GD | Pts | Qualification | WHU | DZA | RWI | GNK |
|---|---|---|---|---|---|---|---|---|---|---|---|---|---|---|
| 1 | (England) West Ham United | 6 | 4 | 1 | 1 | 11 | 3 | +8 | 13 | Advance to round of 16 | — | 0–1 | 2–0 | 3–0 |
| 2 | (Croatia) Dinamo Zagreb | 6 | 3 | 1 | 2 | 9 | 6 | +3 | 10 | Advance to knockout round play-offs | 0–2 | — | 3–1 | 1–1 |
| 3 | (Austria) Rapid Wien | 6 | 2 | 0 | 4 | 4 | 9 | −5 | 6 | Transfer to Europa Conference League | 0–2 | 2–1 | — | 0–1 |
| 4 | (Belgium) Genk | 6 | 1 | 2 | 3 | 4 | 10 | −6 | 5 | | 2–2 | 0–3 | 0–1 | — |

Source: UEFA
Rules for classification: Group stage tiebreakers

| 16 September 2021 1 | Dinamo Zagreb (Croatia) | 0–2 | (England) West Ham United | Zagreb, Croatia |
| 18:45 CET | Mišić (yellow card) 67' | Report | Antonio 22'; Lanzini (yellow card) 32'; Rice 50' | Stadium: Maksimir Stadion; Attendance: 12,344; Referee: Ruddy Buquet (France) |

| 30 September 2021 2 | West Ham United (England) | 2–0 | (Austria) Rapid Wien | Stratford, England |
| 20:00 BST | Rice 29'; Diop (yellow card) 75'; Benrahma 90+4' | Report | Grahovac (yellow card) 44'; Greiml (yellow card) 57' | Stadium: London Stadium; Attendance: 50,004; Referee: Tobias Stieler (Germany) |

| 21 October 2021 3 | West Ham United (England) | 3–0 | (Belgium) Genk | Stratford, England |
| 20:00 BST | Dawson 45+1'; Diop 57'; Bowen 59' | Report | | Stadium: London Stadium; Attendance: 45,980; Referee: Donatas Rumšas (Lithuania) |

| 4 November 2021 4 | Genk (Belgium) | 2–2 | (England) West Ham United | Genk, Belgium |
| 17:45 CET | Paintsil 5', (yellow card) 69'; Thorstvedt (yellow card) 55'; Muñoz (yellow card) 69'; Arteaga (yellow card) 71'; Souček 88' (o.g.) | Report | Rice (yellow card) 15'; Benrahma 59', 82'; Dawson (yellow card) 67' | Stadium: Luminus Arena; Attendance: 12,239; Referee: Aleksandar Stavrev (North Macedonia) |

| 25 November 2021 5 | Rapid Wien (Austria) | 0–2 | (England) West Ham United | Hütteldorf, Austria |
| 17:45 CET | | Report | Yarmolenko 40'; Noble 45+2' (pen.) | Stadium: Allianz Stadion; Attendance: 0 Referee: Sergey Ivanov (Russia) |

| 9 December 2021 6 | West Ham United (England) | 0–1 | (Croatia) Dinamo Zagreb | Stratford, England |
| 20:00 GMT | | Report | Oršić 4'; Ristovski (yellow card) 31'; Ivanušec (yellow card) 44'; Mišić (yellow card) 85' | Stadium: London Stadium; Attendance: 49,401; Referee: Maurizio Mariani (Italy) |

==== Knockout phase ====
===== Round of 16 =====
| 10 March 2022 First leg | Sevilla (Spain) | 1–0 | (England) West Ham United | Seville, Spain |
| 18:45 CET | Munir 60'; Ocampos (yellow card) 90' | Report | Zouma (yellow card) 59'; Lanzini (yellow card) 76'; Rice (yellow card) 90' | Stadium: Ramón Sánchez Pizjuán; Attendance: 34,728; Referee: Sandro Schärer (Switzerland) |

| 17 March 2022 Second leg | West Ham United (England) | 2–0 (a.e.t.) (2–1 agg.) | (Spain) Sevilla | Stratford, England |
| 20:00 GMT | Lanzini (yellow card) 34'; Souček 39'; Yarmolenko 112'; Cresswell (yellow card) 117' | Report | Montiel (yellow card) 120+2' | Stadium: London Stadium; Attendance: 59,981; Referee: Clément Turpin (France) |

===== Quarter-finals =====
| 7 April 2022 First leg | West Ham United (England) | 1–1 | (France) Lyon | Stratford, England |
| 20:00 BST (UTC+1) | Cresswell (red card) 45+3'; Bowen 52', (yellow card) 90+6'; Antonio (yellow card) 88' | Report | Ndombele 66' | Stadium: London Stadium; Attendance: 59,978; Referee: Felix Zwayer (Germany) |

| 14 April 2022 Second leg | Lyon (France) | 0–3 (1–4 agg.) | (England) West Ham United | Décines-Charpieu, France |
| 21:00 CEST (UTC+2) | Barcola (yellow card) 84' | Report | Diop (yellow card) 22'; Dawson 38'; Rice 44'; Bowen 48'; Fornals (yellow card) 85' | Stadium: Groupama Stadium; Attendance: 50,065; Referee: Sandro Schärer (Switzerland) |

===== Semi-finals =====
| 28 April 2022 First leg | West Ham United (England) | 1–2 | (Germany) Eintracht Frankfurt | Stratford, England |
| 20:00 BST (UTC+1) | Antonio 21' | Report | Knauff 1'; Kamada 54'; Sow (yellow card) 79'; Hinteregger (yellow card) 81' | Stadium: London Stadium; Attendance: 58,108; Referee: Serdar Gözübüyük (Netherlands) |

| 5 May 2022 Second leg | Eintracht Frankfurt (Germany) | 1–0 (3–1 agg.) | (England) West Ham United | Frankfurt, Germany |
| 21:00 CEST (UTC+2) | Borré 26'; Ndicka (yellow card) 43'; Rode (yellow card) 66'; Chandler (yellow card) 78'; Knauff (yellow card) 82'; Trapp (yellow card) 90+1' | Report | Cresswell (red card) 17'; Rice (yellow card) 45+3'; Antonio (yellow card) 78'; Benrahma (yellow card) 81' | Stadium: Waldstadion; Attendance: 48,000; Referee: Jesús Gil Manzano (Spain) |

== Statistics ==
- Correct as of 22 May 2022

=== Appearances and goals ===
| No. | Pos | Nat | Player | Total | | Premier League | | FA Cup | | League Cup | | Europa League | |
| No. | Pos | Nat | Player | Apps | Goals | Apps | Goals | Apps | Goals | Apps | Goals | Apps | Goals |
Goalkeepers
| 1 | GK | (Poland) POL | Łukasz Fabiański | 38 | 0 | 37 | 0 | 0 | 0 | 0 | 0 | 1 | 0 |
| 13 | GK | (France) FRA | Alphonse Areola | 18 | 0 | 1 | 0 | 3 | 0 | 3 | 0 | 11 | 0 |
| 35 | GK | (Republic of Ireland) IRL | Darren Randolph | 0 | 0 | 0 | 0 | 0 | 0 | 0 | 0 | 0 | 0 |
Defenders
| 3 | DF | (England) ENG | Aaron Cresswell | 42 | 2 | 31 | 2 | 0+1 | 0 | 1 | 0 | 9 | 0 |
| 4 | DF | (France) FRA | Kurt Zouma | 32 | 1 | 24 | 1 | 2 | 0 | 0 | 0 | 6 | 0 |
| 5 | DF | (Czech Republic) CZE | Vladimír Coufal | 34 | 0 | 25+3 | 0 | 0 | 0 | 0+2 | 0 | 4 | 0 |
| 15 | DF | (England) ENG | Craig Dawson | 50 | 4 | 30+4 | 2 | 2+1 | 0 | 3 | 0 | 10 | 2 |
| 21 | DF | (Italy) ITA | Angelo Ogbonna | 11 | 1 | 11 | 1 | 0 | 0 | 0 | 0 | 0 | 0 |
| 23 | DF | (France) FRA | Issa Diop | 26 | 1 | 10+3 | 0 | 3 | 0 | 3 | 0 | 6+1 | 1 |
| 24 | DF | (England) ENG | Ryan Fredericks | 19 | 0 | 7+4 | 0 | 2 | 0 | 1 | 0 | 2+3 | 0 |
| 26 | DF | (Democratic Republic of the Congo) COD | Arthur Masuaku | 21 | 1 | 6+7 | 1 | 0+1 | 0 | 3 | 0 | 2+2 | 0 |
| 31 | DF | (England) ENG | Ben Johnson | 34 | 1 | 16+4 | 1 | 3 | 0 | 3 | 0 | 6+2 | 0 |
| 42 | DF | (England) ENG | Aji Alese | 1 | 0 | 0 | 0 | 0 | 0 | 0 | 0 | 1 | 0 |
| 50 | DF | (Scotland) SCO | Harrison Ashby | 3 | 0 | 0+1 | 0 | 0 | 0 | 1 | 0 | 1 | 0 |
| 56 | DF | (England) ENG | Emmanuel Longelo | 1 | 0 | 0 | 0 | 0 | 0 | 0 | 0 | 1 | 0 |
| 75 | DF | (England) ENG | Jamal Baptiste | 1 | 0 | 0 | 0 | 0 | 0 | 0 | 0 | 1 | 0 |
Midfielders
| 8 | MF | (Spain) ESP | Pablo Fornals | 54 | 6 | 32+4 | 6 | 1+2 | 0 | 0+3 | 0 | 8+4 | 0 |
| 10 | MF | (Argentina) ARG | Manuel Lanzini | 45 | 7 | 19+11 | 5 | 2 | 1 | 3 | 1 | 9+1 | 0 |
| 11 | MF | (Croatia) CRO | Nikola Vlašić | 31 | 1 | 6+13 | 1 | 2+1 | 0 | 2+1 | 0 | 6 | 0 |
| 16 | MF | (England) ENG | Mark Noble | 23 | 2 | 3+8 | 1 | 1 | 0 | 2 | 0 | 4+5 | 1 |
| 28 | MF | (Czech Republic) CZE | Tomáš Souček | 51 | 6 | 34+1 | 5 | 2+1 | 0 | 2 | 0 | 9+2 | 1 |
| 33 | MF | (Czech Republic) CZE | Alex Král | 6 | 0 | 0+1 | 0 | 1 | 0 | 1 | 0 | 1+2 | 0 |
| 41 | MF | (England) ENG | Declan Rice | 50 | 5 | 35+1 | 1 | 2+1 | 1 | 1 | 0 | 10 | 3 |
| 51 | MF | (England) ENG | Daniel Chesters | 2 | 0 | 0+1 | 0 | 0 | 0 | 0 | 0 | 0+1 | 0 |
| 59 | MF | (England) ENG | Keenan Forson | 1 | 0 | 0 | 0 | 0 | 0 | 0 | 0 | 0+1 | 0 |
| 62 | MF | (England) ENG | Freddie Potts | 1 | 0 | 0 | 0 | 0 | 0 | 0 | 0 | 0+1 | 0 |
| 64 | MF | (England) ENG | Sonny Perkins | 3 | 0 | 0+1 | 0 | 0 | 0 | 0 | 0 | 1+1 | 0 |
Forwards
| 7 | FW | (Ukraine) UKR | Andriy Yarmolenko | 32 | 3 | 1+18 | 1 | 1+1 | 0 | 2+1 | 0 | 4+4 | 2 |
| 9 | FW | (Jamaica) JAM | Michail Antonio | 47 | 13 | 34+2 | 10 | 2 | 1 | 0 | 0 | 9 | 2 |
| 20 | FW | (England) ENG | Jarrod Bowen | 51 | 18 | 34+2 | 12 | 3 | 2 | 2+1 | 1 | 6+3 | 3 |
| 22 | FW | (Algeria) ALG | Saïd Benrahma | 49 | 11 | 26+6 | 8 | 1+1 | 0 | 1+2 | 0 | 4+8 | 3 |

=== Goalscorers ===
- Correct as of 22 May 2022

| Rank | Pos | No. | Nat | Name | Premier League | FA Cup | EFL Cup | Europa League | Total |
|---|---|---|---|---|---|---|---|---|---|
| 1 | FW | 20 | (England) | Jarrod Bowen | 12 | 2 | 1 | 3 | 18 |
| 2 | FW | 9 | (Jamaica) | Michail Antonio | 10 | 1 | 0 | 2 | 13 |
| 3 | MF | 22 | (Algeria) | Saïd Benrahma | 8 | 0 | 0 | 3 | 11 |
| 4 | MF | 10 | (Argentina) | Manuel Lanzini | 5 | 1 | 1 | 0 | 7 |
| 5 | MF | 8 | (Spain) | Pablo Fornals | 6 | 0 | 0 | 0 | 6 |
| 5 | MF | 28 | (Czech Republic) | Tomáš Souček | 5 | 0 | 0 | 1 | 6 |
| 7 | MF | 41 | (England) | Declan Rice | 1 | 1 | 0 | 3 | 5 |
| 8 | DF | 15 | (England) | Craig Dawson | 2 | 0 | 0 | 2 | 4 |
| 9 | FW | 7 | (Ukraine) | Andriy Yarmolenko | 1 | 0 | 0 | 2 | 3 |
| 10 | DF | 3 | (England) | Aaron Cresswell | 2 | 0 | 0 | 0 | 2 |
| 10 | MF | 16 | (England) | Mark Noble | 1 | 0 | 0 | 1 | 2 |
| 12 | DF | 4 | (France) | Kurt Zouma | 1 | 0 | 0 | 0 | 1 |
| 12 | MF | 11 | (Croatia) | Nikola Vlašić | 1 | 0 | 0 | 0 | 1 |
| 12 | DF | 21 | (Italy) | Angelo Ogbonna | 1 | 0 | 0 | 0 | 1 |
| 12 | DF | 23 | (France) | Issa Diop | 0 | 0 | 0 | 1 | 1 |
| 12 | DF | 26 | (Democratic Republic of the Congo) | Arthur Masuaku | 1 | 0 | 0 | 0 | 1 |
| 12 | DF | 31 | (England) | Ben Johnson | 1 | 0 | 0 | 0 | 1 |
| 12 | Own goals | | | | 2 | 0 | 0 | 0 | 2 |
| Totals | | | | | 60 | 5 | 2 | 18 | 85 |

=== Clean sheets ===
The list is sorted by shirt number when total clean sheets are equal.

| Rnk | No. | Player | Premier League | FA Cup | EFL Cup | Europa League | Total |
|---|---|---|---|---|---|---|---|
| 1 | 1 | (Poland) Łukasz Fabiański | 8 | 0 | 0 | 1 | 9 |
| 2 | 13 | (France) Alphonse Areola | 0 | 1 | 2 | 5 | 8 |
| TOTALS | | | 8 | 1 | 2 | 6 | 17 |

Last updated: 8 May 2022.
Source: premierleague.com

== See also ==
- 2021–22 in English football
- List of West Ham United F.C. seasons
