= Sam Bowen =

Sam Bowen may refer to:

- Sam Bowen (baseball) (born 1952), American baseball player
- Sam Bowen (boxer) (born 1992), British boxer
- Sam Bowen (footballer, born 1976), English footballer
- Sam Bowen (footballer, born 2001), Welsh footballer
- Sam Bowens (1938–2003), American baseball player
- Teddy Bowen (Samuel Edward Bowen, 1903–1981), English footballer
