= 2021–22 UEFA Europa League knockout phase =

Association football competition phase

The 2021–22 UEFA Europa League knockout phase began on 17 February with the knockout round play-offs and ended on 18 May 2022 with the final at the Estadio Ramón Sánchez Pizjuán in Seville, Spain, to decide the champions of the 2021–22 UEFA Europa League. A total of 24 teams competed in the knockout phase.

Times are CET/CEST, (Note: CET (UTC+1) for dates up to 26 March 2021 (round of 16), and CEST (UTC+2) for dates thereafter (quarter-finals, semi-finals and final).) as listed by UEFA (local times, if different, are in parentheses).

== Qualified teams ==
The knockout phase involved 24 teams: the 16 teams which qualified as winners and runners-up of each of the eight groups in the group stage, and the eight third-placed teams from the Champions League group stage.

=== Europa League group stage winners and runners-up ===
Group	Winners (advance to round of 16 and seeded in draw)	Runners-up (advance to KO play-offs and seeded in draw)
A	(France) Lyon	(Scotland) Rangers
B	(France) Monaco	(Spain) Real Sociedad
C	(Russia) Spartak Moscow	(Italy) Napoli
D	(Germany) Eintracht Frankfurt	(Greece) Olympiacos
E	(Turkey) Galatasaray	(Italy) Lazio
F	(Serbia) Red Star Belgrade	(Portugal) Braga
G	(Germany) Bayer Leverkusen	(Spain) Real Betis
H	(England) West Ham United	(Croatia) Dinamo Zagreb

=== Champions League group stage third-placed teams ===
Group	Third-placed teams (advance to KO play-offs and unseeded in draw)
A	(Germany) RB Leipzig
B	(Portugal) Porto
C	(Germany) Borussia Dortmund
D	(Moldova) Sheriff Tiraspol
E	(Spain) Barcelona
F	(Italy) Atalanta
G	(Spain) Sevilla
H	(Russia) Zenit Saint Petersburg

== Format ==
Each tie in the knockout phase, apart from the final, was played over two legs, with each team playing one leg at home. The team that scored more goals on aggregate over the two legs advanced to the next round. If the aggregate score was level, then 30 minutes of extra time were played (the away goals rule was not applied). If the score was still level at the end of extra time, the winners were decided by a penalty shoot-out. In the final, which was played as a single match, if the score was level at the end of normal time, extra time was played, followed by a penalty shoot-out if the score was still level. The mechanism of the draws for each round was as follows:

- In the draw for the knockout round play-offs, the eight group runners-up were seeded, and the eight Champions League group third-placed teams were unseeded. The seeded teams were drawn against the unseeded teams, with the seeded teams hosting the second leg. Teams from the same association could not be drawn against each other.
- In the draw for the round of 16, the eight group winners were seeded, and the eight winners of the knockout round play-offs were unseeded. Again, the seeded teams were drawn against the unseeded teams, with the seeded teams hosting the second leg. Once again, teams from the same association could not be drawn against each other.
- In the draws for the quarter-finals onwards, there were no seedings, and teams from the same association could be drawn against each other. As the draws for the quarter-finals and semi-finals were held together before the quarter-finals were played, the identity of the quarter-final winners was not known at the time of the semi-final draw. A draw was also held to determine which semi-final winner was designated as the "home" team for the final (for administrative purposes as it was played at a neutral venue).

In the knockout phase, teams from the same or nearby cities (Porto and Braga, as well as Sevilla and Real Betis) were not scheduled to play at home on the same day, due to logistics and crowd control. To avoid such scheduling conflicts, adjustments had to be made by UEFA. For the knockout round playoffs and a round of 16, since both teams were drawn to play at home in a given leg, the home match of the team that was not domestic cup champions in the qualifying season, or the team with the lower domestic ranking (if neither team were the domestic cup champions, i.e. Porto and Real Betis for this season), was moved from Thursday to Wednesday. For the quarter-finals and semi-finals, if the two teams were drawn to play at home for the same leg, the order of legs of the tie involving the team with the lowest priority was reversed from the original draw.

== Schedule ==
The schedule was as follows (all draws were held at the UEFA headquarters in Nyon, Switzerland).

Round	Draw date	First leg	Second leg
Knockout round play-offs	13 December 2021, 13:00	17 February 2022	24 February 2022
Round of 16	25 February 2022, 12:00	10 March 2022	17 March 2022
Quarter-finals	18 March 2022, 13:30	7 April 2022	14 April 2022
Semi-finals	18 March 2022, 13:30	28 April 2022	5 May 2022
Final	18 March 2022, 13:30	18 May 2022 at Estadio Ramón Sánchez Pizjuán, Seville	

== Bracket ==
Knockout round play-offs
(Spain) Sevilla	3	0	3
(Croatia) Dinamo Zagreb	1	1	2
(Portugal) Porto	2	2	4
(Italy) Lazio	1	2	3
(Russia) Zenit Saint Petersburg	2	0	2
(Spain) Real Betis	3	0	3
(Spain) Barcelona	1	4	5
(Italy) Napoli	1	2	3
(Germany) RB Leipzig	2	3	5
(Spain) Real Sociedad	2	1	3
(Italy) Atalanta	2	3	5
(Greece) Olympiacos	1	0	1
(Moldova) Sheriff Tiraspol	2	0	2 (2)
(Portugal) Braga (p)	0	2	2 (3)
(Germany) Borussia Dortmund	2	2	4
(Scotland) Rangers	4	2	6

Round of 16
(Spain) Sevilla	1	0	1
(England) West Ham United (a.e.t.)	0	2	2
(Portugal) Porto	0	1	1
(France) Lyon	1	1	2
(Spain) Real Betis	1	1	2
(Germany) Eintracht Frankfurt (a.e.t.)	2	1	3
(Spain) Barcelona	0	2	2
(Turkey) Galatasaray	0	1	1
(Germany) RB Leipzig (w/o)	—	—	—
(Russia) Spartak Moscow	—	—	—
(Italy) Atalanta	3	1	4
(Germany) Bayer Leverkusen	2	0	2
(Portugal) Braga	2	1	3
(France) Monaco	0	1	1
(Scotland) Rangers	3	1	4
(Serbia) Red Star Belgrade	0	2	2

Quarter-finals
(England) West Ham United	1	3	4
(France) Lyon	1	0	1
(Germany) Eintracht Frankfurt	1	3	4
(Spain) Barcelona	1	2	3
(Germany) RB Leipzig	1	2	3
(Italy) Atalanta	1	0	1
(Portugal) Braga	1	1	2
(Scotland) Rangers (a.e.t.)	0	3	3

Semi-finals
(England) West Ham United	1	0	1
(Germany) Eintracht Frankfurt	2	1	3
(Germany) RB Leipzig	1	1	2
(Scotland) Rangers	0	3	3

Final
18 May – Seville
(Germany) Eintracht Frankfurt (p)	1 (5)
(Scotland) Rangers	1 (4)

== Knockout round play-offs ==
The draw for the knockout round play-offs was held on 13 December 2021, 13:00 CET.

=== Summary ===
The first legs were played on 17 February, and the second legs were played on 24 February 2022.

Team 1	Agg.	Team 2	1st leg	2nd leg
Sevilla (Spain)	3–2	(Croatia) Dinamo Zagreb	3–1	0–1
Atalanta (Italy)	5–1	(Greece) Olympiacos	2–1	3–0
RB Leipzig (Germany)	5–3	(Spain) Real Sociedad	2–2	3–1
Barcelona (Spain)	5–3	(Italy) Napoli	1–1	4–2
Zenit Saint Petersburg (Russia)	2–3	(Spain) Real Betis	2–3	0–0
Borussia Dortmund (Germany)	4–6	(Scotland) Rangers	2–4	2–2
Sheriff Tiraspol (Moldova)	2–2 (2–3 p)	(Portugal) Braga	2–0	0–2 (a.e.t.)
Porto (Portugal)	4–3	(Italy) Lazio	2–1	2–2

=== Matches ===
17 February 2022
21:00

Sevilla (Spain)	3–1	(Croatia) Dinamo Zagreb
Rakitić 13' (pen.); Ocampos 44'; Martial 45+1'	Report	Oršić 41'

Estadio Ramón Sánchez Pizjuán, Seville
Attendance: 28,372
Referee: Marco Guida (Italy)
24 February 2022
18:45

Dinamo Zagreb (Croatia)	1–0	(Spain) Sevilla
Oršić 65' (pen.)	Report

Stadion Maksimir, Zagreb
Attendance: 9,788
Referee: François Letexier (France)

Sevilla won 3–2 on aggregate.

17 February 2022
21:00

Atalanta (Italy)	2–1	(Greece) Olympiacos
Djimsiti 61', 63'	Report	Soares 16'

Stadio Atleti Azzurri d'Italia, Bergamo
Attendance: 9,448
Referee: Sandro Schärer (Switzerland)
24 February 2022
18:45 (19:45 UTC+3)

Olympiacos (Greece)	0–3	(Italy) Atalanta
	Report	Mæhle 40'; Malinovskyi 67', 69'

Karaiskakis Stadium, Piraeus
Attendance: 15,835
Referee: Carlos del Cerro Grande (Spain)

Atalanta won 5–1 on aggregate.

17 February 2022
21:00

RB Leipzig (Germany)	2–2	(Spain) Real Sociedad
Nkunku 30'; Forsberg 82' (pen.)	Report	Le Normand 8'; Oyarzabal 64' (pen.)

Red Bull Arena, Leipzig
Attendance: 21,113
Referee: Cüneyt Çakır (Turkey)
24 February 2022
18:45

Real Sociedad (Spain)	1–3	(Germany) RB Leipzig
Zubimendi 67'	Report	Orbán 39'; Silva 59'; Forsberg 89' (pen.)

Anoeta, San Sebastián
Attendance: 30,113
Referee: Anthony Taylor (England)

RB Leipzig won 5–3 on aggregate.

17 February 2022
18:45

Barcelona (Spain)	1–1	(Italy) Napoli
Torres 59' (pen.)	Report	Zieliński 29'

Camp Nou, Barcelona
Attendance: 73,525
Referee: István Kovács (Romania)
24 February 2022
21:00

Napoli (Italy)	2–4	(Spain) Barcelona
Insigne 23' (pen.); Politano 87'	Report	Alba 8'; F. de Jong 13'; Piqué 45'; Aubameyang 59'

Stadio Diego Armando Maradona, Naples
Attendance: 37,858
Referee: Sergei Karasev (Russia)

Barcelona won 5–3 on aggregate.

17 February 2022
18:45 (20:45 UTC+3)

Zenit Saint Petersburg (Russia)	2–3	(Spain) Real Betis
Dzyuba 25'; Malcom 28'	Report	Rodríguez 8'; Willian José 18'; Guardado 41'

Krestovsky Stadium, Saint Petersburg
Attendance: 28,936
Referee: Benoît Bastien (France)
24 February 2022
21:00

Real Betis (Spain)	0–0	(Russia) Zenit Saint Petersburg
	Report

Estadio Benito Villamarín, Seville
Attendance: 44,236
Referee: Halil Umut Meler (Turkey)

Real Betis won 3–2 on aggregate.

17 February 2022
18:45

Borussia Dortmund (Germany)	2–4	(Scotland) Rangers
Bellingham 51'; Guerreiro 82'	Report	Tavernier 38' (pen.); Morelos 41'; Lundstram 49'; Zagadou 54' (o.g.)

Westfalenstadion, Dortmund
Attendance: 10,000
Referee: Clément Turpin (France)
24 February 2022
21:00 (20:00 UTC+0)

Rangers (Scotland)	2–2	(Germany) Borussia Dortmund
Tavernier 22' (pen.), 57'	Report	Bellingham 31'; Malen 42'

Ibrox Stadium, Glasgow
Attendance: 47,709
Referee: Antonio Mateu Lahoz (Spain)

Rangers won 6–4 on aggregate.

17 February 2022
18:45 (19:45 UTC+3)

Sheriff Tiraspol (Moldova)	2–0	(Portugal) Braga
Thill 43' (pen.); Traoré 83'	Report

Sheriff Stadium, Tiraspol
Attendance: 3,062
Referee: Danny Makkelie (Netherlands)
24 February 2022
21:00 (20:00 UTC+0)

Braga (Portugal)	2–0 (a.e.t.)	(Moldova) Sheriff Tiraspol
Medeiros 17'; R. Horta 43'	Report
Penalties
R. Horta (penalty scored); Musrati (penalty scored); Ruiz (penalty missed); Carmo (penalty missed); Moura (penalty scored)	3–2	(penalty missed) Dulanto; (penalty missed) Bruno; (penalty missed) Radeljić; (penalty scored) Khalid; (penalty scored) Thill

Estádio Municipal, Braga
Attendance: 9,423
Referee: José María Sánchez Martínez (Spain)

2–2 on aggregate; Braga won 3–2 on penalties.

17 February 2022
21:00 (20:00 UTC+0)

Porto (Portugal)	2–1	(Italy) Lazio
Martínez 37', 49'	Report	Zaccagni 23'

Estádio do Dragão, Porto
Attendance: 32,929
Referee: Serdar Gözübüyük (Netherlands)
24 February 2022
18:45

Lazio (Italy)	2–2	(Portugal) Porto
Immobile 19'; Cataldi 90+5'	Report	Taremi 31' (pen.); Uribe 68'

Stadio Olimpico, Rome
Attendance: 24,948
Referee: Deniz Aytekin (Germany)

Porto won 4–3 on aggregate.

== Round of 16 ==
The draw for the round of 16 was held on 25 February 2022, 12:00 CET.

=== Summary ===
The first legs were played on 9 and 10 March, and the second legs were played on 17 March 2022.

Team 1	Agg.	Team 2	1st leg	2nd leg
Rangers (Scotland)	4–2	(Serbia) Red Star Belgrade	3–0	1–2
Braga (Portugal)	3–1	(France) Monaco	2–0	1–1
Porto (Portugal)	1–2	(France) Lyon	0–1	1–1
Atalanta (Italy)	4–2	(Germany) Bayer Leverkusen	3–2	1–0
Sevilla (Spain)	1–2	(England) West Ham United	1–0	0–2 (a.e.t.)
Barcelona (Spain)	2–1	(Turkey) Galatasaray	0–0	2–1
RB Leipzig (Germany)	w/o (Note: RB Leipzig won on walkover as UEFA suspended Spartak Moscow due to the Russian invasion of Ukraine.)	(Russia) Spartak Moscow	Canc.	Canc.
Real Betis (Spain)	2–3	(Germany) Eintracht Frankfurt	1–2	1–1 (a.e.t.)

=== Matches ===
10 March 2022
21:00 (20:00 UTC+0)

Rangers (Scotland)	3–0	(Serbia) Red Star Belgrade
Tavernier 11' (pen.); Morelos 15'; Balogun 51'	Report

Ibrox Stadium, Glasgow
Attendance: 48,589
Referee: Serdar Gözübüyük (Netherlands)
17 March 2022
18:45

Red Star Belgrade (Serbia)	2–1	(Scotland) Rangers
Ivanić 10'; Nabouhane 90+3' (pen.)	Report	Kent 56'

Red Star Stadium, Belgrade
Attendance: 47,024
Referee: István Kovács (Romania)

Rangers won 4–2 on aggregate.

10 March 2022
21:00 (20:00 UTC+0)

Braga (Portugal)	2–0	(France) Monaco
Ruiz 3'; Vitinha 89'	Report

Estádio Municipal, Braga
Attendance: 10,228
Referee: Felix Zwayer (Germany)
17 March 2022
18:45

Monaco (France)	1–1	(Portugal) Braga
Disasi 90'	Report	Ruiz 20'

Stade Louis II, Monaco
Attendance: 3,892
Referee: Andreas Ekberg (Sweden)

Braga won 3–1 on aggregate.

9 March 2022
18:45 (17:45 UTC+0)

Porto (Portugal)	0–1	(France) Lyon
	Report	Paquetá 59'

Estádio do Dragão, Porto
Attendance: 26,309
Referee: José María Sánchez Martínez (Spain)
17 March 2022
21:00

Lyon (France)	1–1	(Portugal) Porto
Dembélé 13'	Report	Pepê 27'

Parc Olympique Lyonnais, Décines-Charpieu
Attendance: 54,551
Referee: Ovidiu Hațegan (Romania)

Lyon won 2–1 on aggregate.

10 March 2022
21:00

Atalanta (Italy)	3–2	(Germany) Bayer Leverkusen
Malinovskyi 23'; Muriel 25', 49'	Report	Aránguiz 11'; Diaby 63'

Stadio Atleti Azzurri d'Italia, Bergamo
Attendance: 13,134
Referee: Srđan Jovanović (Serbia)
17 March 2022
18:45

Bayer Leverkusen (Germany)	0–1	(Italy) Atalanta
	Report	Boga 90+1'

BayArena, Leverkusen
Attendance: 19,871
Referee: François Letexier (France)

Atalanta won 4–2 on aggregate.

10 March 2022
18:45

Sevilla (Spain)	1–0	(England) West Ham United
Munir 60'	Report

Estadio Ramón Sánchez Pizjuán, Seville
Attendance: 34,728
Referee: Sandro Schärer (Switzerland)
17 March 2022
21:00 (20:00 UTC+0)

West Ham United (England)	2–0 (a.e.t.)	(Spain) Sevilla
Souček 39'; Yarmolenko 112'	Report

London Stadium, London
Attendance: 59,981
Referee: Clément Turpin (France)

West Ham United won 2–1 on aggregate.

10 March 2022
21:00

Barcelona (Spain)	0–0	(Turkey) Galatasaray
	Report

Camp Nou, Barcelona
Attendance: 61,740
Referee: Benoît Bastien (France)
17 March 2022
18:45 (20:45 UTC+3)

Galatasaray (Turkey)	1–2	(Spain) Barcelona
Marcão 29'	Report	Pedri 37'; Aubameyang 49'

Nef Stadium, Istanbul
Attendance: 50,110
Referee: Daniele Orsato (Italy)

Barcelona won 2–1 on aggregate.

10 March 2022
18:45

RB Leipzig (Germany)	Cancelled (Note: Both legs were cancelled and RB Leipzig won on walkover as UEFA suspended Russian club Spartak Moscow due to the Russian invasion of Ukraine.)	(Russia) Spartak Moscow
	Report

Red Bull Arena, Leipzig
17 March 2022

Spartak Moscow (Russia)	Cancelled	(Germany) RB Leipzig
	Report

Otkritie Arena, Moscow

RB Leipzig won on walkover as Spartak Moscow were disqualified.

9 March 2022
18:45

Real Betis (Spain)	1–2	(Germany) Eintracht Frankfurt
Fekir 30'	Report	Kostić 14'; Kamada 32'

Estadio Benito Villamarín, Seville
Attendance: 36,574
Referee: Marco Guida (Italy)
17 March 2022
21:00

Eintracht Frankfurt (Germany)	1–1 (a.e.t.)	(Spain) Real Betis
Rodríguez 120+1' (o.g.)	Report	Iglesias 90'

Waldstadion, Frankfurt
Attendance: 25,000
Referee: Michael Oliver (England)

Eintracht Frankfurt won 3–2 on aggregate.

== Quarter-finals ==
The draw for the quarter-finals was held on 18 March 2022, 13:30 CET.

=== Summary ===
The first legs were played on 7 April, and the second legs were played on 14 April 2022.

Team 1	Agg.	Team 2	1st leg	2nd leg
RB Leipzig (Germany)	3–1	(Italy) Atalanta	1–1	2–0
Eintracht Frankfurt (Germany)	4–3	(Spain) Barcelona	1–1	3–2
West Ham United (England)	4–1	(France) Lyon	1–1	3–0
Braga (Portugal)	2–3	(Scotland) Rangers	1–0	1–3 (a.e.t.)

=== Matches ===
7 April 2022
18:45

RB Leipzig (Germany)	1–1	(Italy) Atalanta
Zappacosta 58' (o.g.)	Report	Muriel 17'

Red Bull Arena, Leipzig
Attendance: 36,029
Referee: Michael Oliver (England)
14 April 2022
18:45

Atalanta (Italy)	0–2	(Germany) RB Leipzig
	Report	Nkunku 18', 87' (pen.)

Stadio Atleti Azzurri d'Italia, Bergamo
Attendance: 17,905
Referee: Antonio Mateu Lahoz (Spain)

RB Leipzig won 3–1 on aggregate.

7 April 2022
21:00

Eintracht Frankfurt (Germany)	1–1	(Spain) Barcelona
Knauff 48'	Report	Torres 66'

Waldstadion, Frankfurt
Attendance: 48,000
Referee: Srđan Jovanović (Serbia)
14 April 2022
21:00

Barcelona (Spain)	2–3	(Germany) Eintracht Frankfurt
Busquets 90+1'; Depay 90+11' (pen.)	Report	Kostić 4' (pen.), 67'; Borré 36'

Camp Nou, Barcelona
Attendance: 79,468
Referee: Artur Soares Dias (Portugal)

Eintracht Frankfurt won 4–3 on aggregate.

7 April 2022
21:00 (20:00 UTC+1)

West Ham United (England)	1–1	(France) Lyon
Bowen 52'	Report	Ndombele 66'

London Stadium, London
Attendance: 59,978
Referee: Felix Zwayer (Germany)
14 April 2022
21:00

Lyon (France)	0–3	(England) West Ham United
	Report	Dawson 38'; Rice 44'; Bowen 48'

Parc Olympique Lyonnais, Décines-Charpieu
Attendance: 50,065
Referee: Sandro Schärer (Switzerland)

West Ham United won 4–1 on aggregate.

7 April 2022
21:00 (20:00 UTC+1)

Braga (Portugal)	1–0	(Scotland) Rangers
Ruiz 40'	Report

Estádio Municipal, Braga
Attendance: 20,331
Referee: Davide Massa (Italy)
14 April 2022
21:00 (20:00 UTC+1)

Rangers (Scotland)	3–1 (a.e.t.)	(Portugal) Braga
Tavernier 2', 44' (pen.); Roofe 101'	Report	Carmo 83'

Ibrox Stadium, Glasgow
Attendance: 48,894
Referee: François Letexier (France)

Rangers won 3–2 on aggregate.

== Semi-finals ==
The draw for the semi-finals was held on 18 March 2022, 13:30 CET, after the quarter-final draw.

=== Summary ===
The first legs were played on 28 April, and the second legs were played on 5 May 2022.

Team 1	Agg.	Team 2	1st leg	2nd leg
RB Leipzig (Germany)	2–3	(Scotland) Rangers	1–0	1–3
West Ham United (England)	1–3	(Germany) Eintracht Frankfurt	1–2	0–1

=== Matches ===
28 April 2022
21:00

RB Leipzig (Germany)	1–0	(Scotland) Rangers
Angeliño 85'	Report

Red Bull Arena, Leipzig
Attendance: 40,303
Referee: Benoît Bastien (France)
5 May 2022
21:00 (20:00 UTC+1)

Rangers (Scotland)	3–1	(Germany) RB Leipzig
Tavernier 19'; Kamara 24'; Lundstram 81'	Report	Nkunku 71'

Ibrox Stadium, Glasgow
Attendance: 49,397
Referee: Artur Soares Dias (Portugal)

Rangers won 3–2 on aggregate.

28 April 2022
21:00 (20:00 UTC+1)

West Ham United (England)	1–2	(Germany) Eintracht Frankfurt
Antonio 21'	Report	Knauff 1'; Kamada 54'

London Stadium, London
Attendance: 58,108
Referee: Serdar Gözübüyük (Netherlands)
5 May 2022
21:00

Eintracht Frankfurt (Germany)	1–0	(England) West Ham United
Borré 26'	Report

Waldstadion, Frankfurt
Attendance: 48,000
Referee: Jesús Gil Manzano (Spain)

Eintracht Frankfurt won 3–1 on aggregate.

== Final ==
The final was played on 18 May 2022 at the Estadio Ramón Sánchez Pizjuán in Seville. A draw was held on 18 March 2022, after the quarter-final and semi-final draws, to determine the "home" team for administrative purposes.

18 May 2022
21:00

Eintracht Frankfurt (Germany)	1–1 (a.e.t.)	(Scotland) Rangers
Borré 69'	Report	Aribo 57'
Penalties
Lenz (penalty scored); Hrustic (penalty scored); Kamada (penalty scored); Kostić (penalty scored); Borré (penalty scored)	5–4	(penalty scored) Tavernier; (penalty scored) Davis; (penalty scored) Arfield; (penalty missed) Ramsey; (penalty scored) Roofe

Estadio Ramón Sánchez Pizjuán, Seville
Attendance: 38,842
Referee: Slavko Vinčić (Slovenia)
