= 2021–22 UEFA Europa League group stage =

51st season of the club football tournament

The 2021–22 UEFA Europa League group stage began on 15 September 2021 and ended on 9 December 2021. A total of 32 teams competed in the group stage to decide 16 of the 24 places in the knockout phase of the 2021–22 UEFA Europa League.

Brøndby and West Ham United made their debut appearances in the Europa League group stage (although Brøndby had previously appeared in the UEFA Cup group stage).

== Draw ==
The draw for the group stage was held on 27 August 2021, 12:00 Central European Summer Time (CEST) (13:00 TRT), in Istanbul, Turkey. For the draw, the 32 teams were seeded into four pots, each of eight teams, based on their 2021 UEFA club coefficients. Teams from the same association could not be drawn into the same group. Prior to the draw, UEFA formed pairings of teams from the same association, including those playing in the Europa Conference League group stage (one pairing for associations with two or three teams, two pairings for associations with four or five teams), based on television audiences, where one team was drawn into Groups A–D and another team was drawn into Groups E–H, so that the two teams would have different kick-off times. The following pairings were announced by UEFA after the group stage teams were confirmed (the second team in a pairing marked by UECL are playing in the Europa Conference League group stage):

1. (France) Lyon and Marseille
2. (Italy) Napoli and Lazio
3. (Germany) Bayer Leverkusen and Eintracht Frankfurt
4. (Greece) Olympiacos and PAOK (UECL)
5. (France) Monaco and Rennes (UECL)
6. (Scotland) Celtic and Rangers
7. (Serbia) Red Star Belgrade and Partizan (UECL)
8. (England) Leicester City and West Ham United
9. (Russia) Lokomotiv Moscow and Spartak Moscow
10. (Belgium) Genk and Antwerp
11. (Netherlands) PSV Eindhoven and Feyenoord (UECL)
12. (Bulgaria) Ludogorets Razgrad and CSKA Sofia (UECL)
13. (Spain) Real Sociedad and Real Betis
14. (Turkey) Fenerbahçe and Galatasaray
15. (Austria) Rapid Wien and Sturm Graz
16. (Denmark) Midtjylland and Brøndby

On each matchday, one set of four groups played their matches on 18:45 CET/CEST, while the other set of four groups played their matches on 21:00 CET/CEST, with the two sets of groups alternating between each matchday. The fixtures were decided after the draw, using a computer draw not shown to public. Each team would not play more than two home matches or two away matches in a row, and would play one home match and one away match on the first and last matchdays (Regulations Article 15.02). This arrangement was different from previous seasons, where the same two teams would play at home on the first and last matchdays.

== Teams ==
Below were the participating teams (with their 2021 UEFA club coefficients), grouped by their seeding pot. They included:

- 12 teams which entered in this stage
- 10 winners of the play-off round
- 6 losers of the Champions League play-off round (4 from Champions Path, 2 from League Path)
- 4 League Path losers of the third qualifying round

Key to colours
Group winners advanced directly to round of 16
Group runners-up advanced to knockout round play-offs
Third-placed teams entered Europa Conference League knockout round play-offs

Pot 1
| Team | Notes | Coeff. |
|---|---|---|
| (France) Lyon | | 76.000 |
| (Italy) Napoli | | 74.000 |
| (Germany) Bayer Leverkusen | | 57.000 |
| (Croatia) Dinamo Zagreb | | 44.500 |
| (Italy) Lazio | | 44.000 |
| (Greece) Olympiacos | | 43.000 |
| (France) Monaco | | 36.000 |
| (Portugal) Braga | | 35.000 |

Pot 2
| Team | Notes | Coeff. |
|---|---|---|
| (Scotland) Celtic | | 34.000 |
| (Germany) Eintracht Frankfurt | | 33.000 |
| (Serbia) Red Star Belgrade | | 32.500 |
| (England) Leicester City | | 32.000 |
| (Scotland) Rangers | | 31.250 |
| (Russia) Lokomotiv Moscow | | 31.000 |
| (Belgium) Genk | | 30.000 |
| (Netherlands) PSV Eindhoven | | 29.000 |

Pot 3
| Team | Notes | Coeff. |
|---|---|---|
| (France) Marseille | | 28.000 |
| (Bulgaria) Ludogorets Razgrad | | 28.000 |
| (England) West Ham United | | 20.113 |
| (Spain) Real Sociedad | | 19.571 |
| (Spain) Real Betis | | 19.571 |
| (Turkey) Fenerbahçe | | 19.500 |
| (Russia) Spartak Moscow | | 18.500 |
| (Czech Republic) Sparta Prague | | 17.500 |

Pot 4
| Team | Notes | Coeff. |
|---|---|---|
| (Austria) Rapid Wien | | 17.000 |
| (Turkey) Galatasaray | | 17.000 |
| (Poland) Legia Warsaw | | 16.500 |
| (Denmark) Midtjylland | | 13.500 |
| (Hungary) Ferencváros | | 13.500 |
| (Belgium) Antwerp | | 10.500 |
| (Austria) Sturm Graz | | 7.165 |
| (Denmark) Brøndby | | 7.000 |

Notes

1. ^{EL-PO} Winners of play-off round.
2. ^{CL-CP} Losers of Champions League play-off round (Champions Path).
3. ^{CL-LP} Losers of Champions League play-off round (League Path).
4. ^{CL-LQ} Losers of Champions League third qualifying round (League Path).

== Format ==
In each group, teams played against each other home-and-away in a round-robin format. The winners of each group advanced to the round of 16, while the runners-up advanced to the knockout round play-offs. The third-placed teams were transferred to the Europa Conference League knockout round play-offs, while the fourth-placed teams were eliminated from European competitions for the season.

=== Tiebreakers ===
Teams were ranked according to points (3 points for a win, 1 point for a draw, 0 points for a loss). If two or more teams were tied on points, the following tiebreaking criteria were applied, in the order given, to determine the rankings (see Article 16 Equality of points – group stage, Regulations of the UEFA Europa League):

1. Points in head-to-head matches among the tied teams;
2. Goal difference in head-to-head matches among the tied teams;
3. Goals scored in head-to-head matches among the tied teams;
4. If more than two teams were tied, and after applying all head-to-head criteria above, a subset of teams were still tied, all head-to-head criteria above were reapplied exclusively to this subset of teams;
5. Goal difference in all group matches;
6. Goals scored in all group matches;
7. Away goals scored in all group matches;
8. Wins in all group matches;
9. Away wins in all group matches;
10. Disciplinary points (direct red card = 3 points; double yellow card = 3 points; single yellow card = 1 point);
11. UEFA club coefficient.

Due to the abolition of the away goals rule, head-to-head away goals were no longer applied as a tiebreaker starting from this season. However, total away goals were still applied as a tiebreaker.

== Groups ==
The fixtures were announced on 28 August 2021, the day after the draw. The matches were played on 15–16 September, 30 September, 19–21 October, 4 November, 24–25 November, and 9 December 2021 (all three home matches of Spartak Moscow were played on Wednesdays, and one home match of Celtic was played on Tuesday, to avoid scheduling conflicts with home matches of Lokomotiv Moscow and Rangers respectively). The scheduled kick-off times were 18:45 and 21:00 CET/CEST (the rescheduled matches on Tuesdays and Wednesdays were played on 16:30 CET/CEST to avoid conflicts with Champions League matches).

Times were CET/CEST, (Note: CEST (UTC+2) for dates up to 30 October 2021 (matchdays 1–3), and CET (UTC+1) for dates thereafter (matchdays 4–6).) as listed by UEFA (local times, if different, are in parentheses).

=== Group A ===
| Pos | Team | Pld | W | D | L | GF | GA | GD | Pts | Qualification | LYO | RAN | SPP | BRO |
|---|---|---|---|---|---|---|---|---|---|---|---|---|---|---|
| 1 | (France) Lyon | 6 | 5 | 1 | 0 | 16 | 5 | +11 | 16 | Advance to round of 16 | — | 1–1 | 3–0 | 3–0 |
| 2 | (Scotland) Rangers | 6 | 2 | 2 | 2 | 6 | 5 | +1 | 8 | Advance to knockout round play-offs | 0–2 | — | 2–0 | 2–0 |
| 3 | (Czech Republic) Sparta Prague | 6 | 2 | 1 | 3 | 6 | 9 | −3 | 7 | Transfer to Europa Conference League | 3–4 | 1–0 | — | 2–0 |
| 4 | (Denmark) Brøndby | 6 | 0 | 2 | 4 | 2 | 11 | −9 | 2 | | 1–3 | 1–1 | 0–0 | — |

Source: UEFA
Rules for classification: Group stage tiebreakers
16 September 2021
21:00 (20:00 UTC+1)

| Rangers (Scotland) | 0–2 | (France) Lyon |
|---|---|---|
| | Report | Toko Ekambi 23'; Tavernier 55' (o.g.) |

Ibrox Stadium, Glasgow
Attendance: 44,906
Referee: Andreas Ekberg (Sweden)
16 September 2021
21:00

| Brøndby (Denmark) | 0–0 | (Czech Republic) Sparta Prague |
|---|---|---|
| | Report |

Brøndby Stadium, Brøndbyvester
Attendance: 18,867
Referee: Aleksandar Stavrev (North Macedonia)

30 September 2021
18:45

| Lyon (France) | 3–0 | (Denmark) Brøndby |
|---|---|---|
| Toko Ekambi 64', 71'; Aouar 86' | Report |

Parc Olympique Lyonnais, Décines-Charpieu
Attendance: 25,466
Referee: Harald Lechner (Austria)
30 September 2021
18:45

| Sparta Prague (Czech Republic) | 1–0 | (Scotland) Rangers |
|---|---|---|
| Hancko 29' | Report |

Stadion Letná, Prague
Attendance: 10,879
Referee: Ali Palabıyık (Turkey)

21 October 2021
21:00

| Sparta Prague (Czech Republic) | 3–4 | (France) Lyon |
|---|---|---|
| Haraslín 4', 19'; Krejčí II 90+6' | Report | Toko Ekambi 42', 88'; Aouar 53'; Paquetá 67' |

Stadion Letná, Prague
Attendance: 12,427
Referee: Matej Jug (Slovenia)
21 October 2021
21:00 (20:00 UTC+1)

| Rangers (Scotland) | 2–0 | (Denmark) Brøndby |
|---|---|---|
| Balogun 18'; Roofe 30' | Report |

Ibrox Stadium, Glasgow
Attendance: 46,842
Referee: Fran Jović (Croatia)

4 November 2021
18:45

| Lyon (France) | 3–0 | (Czech Republic) Sparta Prague |
|---|---|---|
| Slimani 61', 63'; Toko Ekambi 90+2' | Report |

Parc Olympique Lyonnais, Décines-Charpieu
Attendance: 33,934
Referee: Maurizio Mariani (Italy)
4 November 2021
18:45

| Brøndby (Denmark) | 1–1 | (Scotland) Rangers |
|---|---|---|
| Balogun 45' (o.g.) | Report | Hagi 77' |

Brøndby Stadium, Brøndbyvester
Attendance: 20,462
Referee: Nikola Dabanović (Montenegro)

25 November 2021
21:00 (20:00 UTC+0)

| Rangers (Scotland) | 2–0 | (Czech Republic) Sparta Prague |
|---|---|---|
| Morelos 15', 49' | Report |

Ibrox Stadium, Glasgow
Attendance: 48,370
Referee: Danny Makkelie (Netherlands)
25 November 2021
21:00

| Brøndby (Denmark) | 1–3 | (France) Lyon |
|---|---|---|
| Uhre 51' | Report | Cherki 57', 66'; Slimani 76' |

Brøndby Stadium, Brøndbyvester
Attendance: 16,645
Referee: Georgi Kabakov (Bulgaria)

9 December 2021
18:45

| Lyon (France) | 1–1 | (Scotland) Rangers |
|---|---|---|
| Bassey 49' (o.g.) | Report | S. Wright 42' |

Parc Olympique Lyonnais, Décines-Charpieu
Attendance: 26,842
Referee: Radu Petrescu (Romania)
9 December 2021
18:45

| Sparta Prague (Czech Republic) | 2–0 | (Denmark) Brøndby |
|---|---|---|
| Hancko 43'; Hložek 49' | Report |

Stadion Letná, Prague
Attendance: 976
Referee: Craig Pawson (England)

=== Group B ===
| Pos | Team | Pld | W | D | L | GF | GA | GD | Pts | Qualification | MON | RSO | PSV | STU |
|---|---|---|---|---|---|---|---|---|---|---|---|---|---|---|
| 1 | (France) Monaco | 6 | 3 | 3 | 0 | 7 | 4 | +3 | 12 | Advance to round of 16 | — | 2–1 | 0–0 | 1–0 |
| 2 | (Spain) Real Sociedad | 6 | 2 | 3 | 1 | 9 | 6 | +3 | 9 | Advance to knockout round play-offs | 1–1 | — | 3–0 | 1–1 |
| 3 | (Netherlands) PSV Eindhoven | 6 | 2 | 2 | 2 | 9 | 8 | +1 | 8 | Transfer to Europa Conference League | 1–2 | 2–2 | — | 2–0 |
| 4 | (Austria) Sturm Graz | 6 | 0 | 2 | 4 | 3 | 10 | −7 | 2 | | 1–1 | 0–1 | 1–4 | — |

Source: UEFA
Rules for classification: Group stage tiebreakers
16 September 2021
21:00

| PSV Eindhoven (Netherlands) | 2–2 | (Spain) Real Sociedad |
|---|---|---|
| Götze 32'; Gakpo 54' | Report | Januzaj 34'; Isak 39' |

Philips Stadion, Eindhoven
Attendance: 23,135
Referee: Willie Collum (Scotland)
16 September 2021
21:00

| Monaco (France) | 1–0 | (Austria) Sturm Graz |
|---|---|---|
| Diatta 66' | Report |

Stade Louis II, Monaco
Attendance: 2,941
Referee: Donatas Rumšas (Lithuania)

30 September 2021
18:45

| Real Sociedad (Spain) | 1–1 | (France) Monaco |
|---|---|---|
| Merino 53' | Report | Disasi 16' |

Anoeta, San Sebastián
Attendance: 23,765
Referee: Sergey Ivanov (Russia)
30 September 2021
18:45

| Sturm Graz (Austria) | 1–4 | (Netherlands) PSV Eindhoven |
|---|---|---|
| Stanković 55' | Report | Sangaré 32'; Zahavi 51'; Max 74'; Vertessen 78' |

Liebenauer Stadium, Graz
Attendance: 15,026
Referee: Yevhen Aranovskyi (Ukraine)

21 October 2021
21:00

| Sturm Graz (Austria) | 0–1 | (Spain) Real Sociedad |
|---|---|---|
| | Report | Isak 69' |

Liebenauer Stadium, Graz
Attendance: 14,809
Referee: Tobias Stieler (Germany)
21 October 2021
21:00

| PSV Eindhoven (Netherlands) | 1–2 | (France) Monaco |
|---|---|---|
| Gakpo 59' | Report | Boadu 20'; Diop 89' |

Philips Stadion, Eindhoven
Attendance: 33,000
Referee: Davide Massa (Italy)

4 November 2021
18:45

| Monaco (France) | 0–0 | (Netherlands) PSV Eindhoven |
|---|---|---|
| | Report |

Stade Louis II, Monaco
Attendance: 5,840
Referee: Cüneyt Çakır (Turkey)
4 November 2021
18:45

| Real Sociedad (Spain) | 1–1 | (Austria) Sturm Graz |
|---|---|---|
| Sørloth 53' | Report | Jantscher 38' |

Anoeta, San Sebastián
Attendance: 25,010
Referee: Andris Treimanis (Latvia)

25 November 2021
21:00

| Monaco (France) | 2–1 | (Spain) Real Sociedad |
|---|---|---|
| Volland 28'; Fofana 38' | Report | Isak 35' |

Stade Louis II, Monaco
Attendance: 3,834
Referee: Ivan Kružliak (Slovakia)
25 November 2021
21:00

| PSV Eindhoven (Netherlands) | 2–0 | (Austria) Sturm Graz |
|---|---|---|
| Carlos Vinícius 45' (pen.); Bruma 56' | Report |

Philips Stadion, Eindhoven
Attendance: 0 (Note: Due to the COVID-19 pandemic in Europe, the match was played behind closed doors.)
Referee: Paweł Raczkowski (Poland)

9 December 2021
18:45

| Real Sociedad (Spain) | 3–0 | (Netherlands) PSV Eindhoven |
|---|---|---|
| Oyarzabal 43' (pen.), 62'; Sørloth 90+3' | Report |

Anoeta, San Sebastián
Attendance: 24,940
Referee: Felix Zwayer (Germany)
9 December 2021
18:45

| Sturm Graz (Austria) | 1–1 | (France) Monaco |
|---|---|---|
| Jantscher 7' (pen.) | Report | Volland 30' |

Liebenauer Stadium, Graz
Attendance: 0
Referee: Mohammed Al-Hakim (Sweden)

=== Group C ===
| Pos | Team | Pld | W | D | L | GF | GA | GD | Pts | Qualification | SPM | NAP | LEI | LEG |
|---|---|---|---|---|---|---|---|---|---|---|---|---|---|---|
| 1 | (Russia) Spartak Moscow | 6 | 3 | 1 | 2 | 10 | 9 | +1 | 10 (Note: Head–to–head points: Spartak Moscow 6, Napoli 0.) | Advance to round of 16 | — | 2–1 | 3–4 | 0–1 |
| 2 | (Italy) Napoli | 6 | 3 | 1 | 2 | 15 | 10 | +5 | 10 | Advance to knockout round play-offs | 2–3 | — | 3–2 | 3–0 |
| 3 | (England) Leicester City | 6 | 2 | 2 | 2 | 12 | 11 | +1 | 8 | Transfer to Europa Conference League | 1–1 | 2–2 | — | 3–1 |
| 4 | (Poland) Legia Warsaw | 6 | 2 | 0 | 4 | 4 | 11 | −7 | 6 | | 0–1 | 1–4 | 1–0 | — |

Source: UEFA
Rules for classification: Group stage tiebreakers
Notes:
15 September 2021 (Note: All three home matches of Spartak Moscow were played on Wednesdays instead of Thursdays to avoid scheduling conflicts with the home matches of Lokomotiv Moscow on the same day, as Lokomotiv Moscow (cup winners) have higher scheduling priority over Spartak Moscow (league runners-up) in the Europa League.)
16:30 (17:30 UTC+3)

| Spartak Moscow (Russia) | 0–1 | (Poland) Legia Warsaw |
|---|---|---|
| | Report | Kastrati 90+1' |

Otkritie Arena, Moscow
Attendance: 6,832
Referee: Nikola Dabanović (Montenegro)
16 September 2021
21:00 (20:00 UTC+1)

| Leicester City (England) | 2–2 | (Italy) Napoli |
|---|---|---|
| Pérez 9'; Barnes 64' | Report | Osimhen 69', 87' |

King Power Stadium, Leicester
Attendance: 29,579
Referee: Tiago Martins (Portugal)

30 September 2021
18:45

| Napoli (Italy) | 2–3 | (Russia) Spartak Moscow |
|---|---|---|
| Elmas 1'; Osimhen 90+4' | Report | Promes 55', 90'; Ignatov 80' |

Stadio Diego Armando Maradona, Naples
Attendance: 13,373
Referee: Ivan Kružliak (Slovakia)
30 September 2021
18:45

| Legia Warsaw (Poland) | 1–0 | (England) Leicester City |
|---|---|---|
| Emreli 31' | Report |

Stadion Wojska Polskiego, Warsaw
Attendance: 27,087
Referee: Ivan Bebek (Croatia)

20 October 2021
16:30 (17:30 UTC+3)

| Spartak Moscow (Russia) | 3–4 | (England) Leicester City |
|---|---|---|
| Sobolev 11', 86'; Larsson 44' | Report | Daka 45', 48', 54', 79' |

Otkritie Arena, Moscow
Attendance: 11,366
Referee: Anastasios Sidiropoulos (Greece)
21 October 2021
21:00

| Napoli (Italy) | 3–0 | (Poland) Legia Warsaw |
|---|---|---|
| Insigne 76'; Osimhen 80'; Politano 90+5' | Report |

Stadio Diego Armando Maradona, Naples
Attendance: 10,346
Referee: Carlos del Cerro Grande (Spain)

4 November 2021
18:45

| Legia Warsaw (Poland) | 1–4 | (Italy) Napoli |
|---|---|---|
| Emreli 10' | Report | Zieliński 51' (pen.); Mertens 75' (pen.); Lozano 79'; Ounas 90' |

Stadion Wojska Polskiego, Warsaw
Attendance: 25,706
Referee: Lawrence Visser (Belgium)
4 November 2021
21:00 (20:00 UTC+0)

| Leicester City (England) | 1–1 | (Russia) Spartak Moscow |
|---|---|---|
| Amartey 58' | Report | Moses 51' |

King Power Stadium, Leicester
Attendance: 30,222
Referee: Halil Umut Meler (Turkey)

24 November 2021
16:30 (18:30 UTC+3)

| Spartak Moscow (Russia) | 2–1 | (Italy) Napoli |
|---|---|---|
| Sobolev 3' (pen.), 28' | Report | Elmas 64' |

Otkritie Arena, Moscow
Attendance: 10,852
Referee: Clément Turpin (France)
25 November 2021
21:00 (20:00 UTC+0)

| Leicester City (England) | 3–1 | (Poland) Legia Warsaw |
|---|---|---|
| Daka 11'; Maddison 21'; Ndidi 33' | Report | Mladenović 27' |

King Power Stadium, Leicester
Attendance: 30,658
Referee: Deniz Aytekin (Germany)

9 December 2021
18:45

| Napoli (Italy) | 3–2 | (England) Leicester City |
|---|---|---|
| Ounas 4'; Elmas 24', 53' | Report | Evans 27'; Dewsbury-Hall 33' |

Stadio Diego Armando Maradona, Naples
Attendance: 14,646
Referee: Antonio Mateu Lahoz (Spain)
9 December 2021
18:45

| Legia Warsaw (Poland) | 0–1 | (Russia) Spartak Moscow |
|---|---|---|
| | Report | Bakayev 17' |

Stadion Wojska Polskiego, Warsaw
Attendance: 21,629
Referee: Matej Jug (Slovenia)

=== Group D ===
| Pos | Team | Pld | W | D | L | GF | GA | GD | Pts | Qualification | FRA | OLY | FEN | ANT |
|---|---|---|---|---|---|---|---|---|---|---|---|---|---|---|
| 1 | (Germany) Eintracht Frankfurt | 6 | 3 | 3 | 0 | 10 | 6 | +4 | 12 | Advance to round of 16 | — | 3–1 | 1–1 | 2–2 |
| 2 | (Greece) Olympiacos | 6 | 3 | 0 | 3 | 8 | 7 | +1 | 9 | Advance to knockout round play-offs | 1–2 | — | 1–0 | 2–1 |
| 3 | (Turkey) Fenerbahçe | 6 | 1 | 3 | 2 | 7 | 8 | −1 | 6 | Transfer to Europa Conference League | 1–1 | 0–3 | — | 2–2 |
| 4 | (Belgium) Antwerp | 6 | 1 | 2 | 3 | 6 | 10 | −4 | 5 | | 0–1 | 1–0 | 0–3 | — |

Source: UEFA
Rules for classification: Group stage tiebreakers
16 September 2021
21:00

| Eintracht Frankfurt (Germany) | 1–1 | (Turkey) Fenerbahçe |
|---|---|---|
| Lammers 41' | Report | Özil 10' |

Waldstadion, Frankfurt
Attendance: 25,000
Referee: Maurizio Mariani (Italy)
16 September 2021
21:00 (22:00 UTC+3)

| Olympiacos (Greece) | 2–1 | (Belgium) Antwerp |
|---|---|---|
| El-Arabi 52'; Reabciuk 87' | Report | Samatta 75' |

Karaiskakis Stadium, Piraeus
Attendance: 15,615
Referee: Tamás Bognár (Hungary)

30 September 2021
18:45

| Antwerp (Belgium) | 0–1 | (Germany) Eintracht Frankfurt |
|---|---|---|
| | Report | Paciência 90+1' (pen.) |

Bosuilstadion, Antwerp
Attendance: 13,193
Referee: Jakob Kehlet (Denmark)
30 September 2021
18:45 (19:45 UTC+3)

| Fenerbahçe (Turkey) | 0–3 | (Greece) Olympiacos |
|---|---|---|
| | Report | Soares 6'; Masouras 63', 68' |

Şükrü Saracoğlu Stadium, Istanbul
Attendance: 22,160
Referee: Alejandro Hernández Hernández (Spain)

21 October 2021
18:45 (19:45 UTC+3)

| Fenerbahçe (Turkey) | 2–2 | (Belgium) Antwerp |
|---|---|---|
| Valencia 21', 45' (pen.) | Report | Samatta 2'; Gerkens 62' |

Şükrü Saracoğlu Stadium, Istanbul
Attendance: 16,629
Referee: Sergey Ivanov (Russia)
21 October 2021
21:00

| Eintracht Frankfurt (Germany) | 3–1 | (Greece) Olympiacos |
|---|---|---|
| Borré 26' (pen.); Touré 45+3'; Kamada 59' | Report | El-Arabi 30' (pen.) |

Waldstadion, Frankfurt
Attendance: 35,000
Referee: Tiago Martins (Portugal)

4 November 2021
18:45 (19:45 UTC+2)

| Olympiacos (Greece) | 1–2 | (Germany) Eintracht Frankfurt |
|---|---|---|
| El-Arabi 12' | Report | Kamada 17'; Hauge 90+2' |

Karaiskakis Stadium, Piraeus
Attendance: 23,050
Referee: Aleksei Kulbakov (Belarus)
4 November 2021
21:00

| Antwerp (Belgium) | 0–3 | (Turkey) Fenerbahçe |
|---|---|---|
| | Report | Yandaş 8'; Meyer 16'; Berisha 29' |

Bosuilstadion, Antwerp
Attendance: 0 (Note: The match was played behind closed doors.)
Referee: Irfan Peljto (Bosnia and Herzegovina)

25 November 2021
21:00

| Eintracht Frankfurt (Germany) | 2–2 | (Belgium) Antwerp |
|---|---|---|
| Kamada 13'; Paciência 90+4' | Report | Nainggolan 33'; Samatta 88' |

Waldstadion, Frankfurt
Attendance: 30,000
Referee: Paul Tierney (England)
25 November 2021
21:00 (22:00 UTC+2)

| Olympiacos (Greece) | 1–0 | (Turkey) Fenerbahçe |
|---|---|---|
| Soares 90' | Report |

Karaiskakis Stadium, Piraeus
Attendance: 22,405
Referee: Antonio Mateu Lahoz (Spain)

9 December 2021
18:45 (20:45 UTC+3)

| Fenerbahçe (Turkey) | 1–1 | (Germany) Eintracht Frankfurt |
|---|---|---|
| Berisha 42' | Report | Sow 29' |

Şükrü Saracoğlu Stadium, Istanbul
Attendance: 8,932
Referee: Srđan Jovanović (Serbia)
9 December 2021
18:45

| Antwerp (Belgium) | 1–0 | (Greece) Olympiacos |
|---|---|---|
| Balikwisha 7' | Report |

Bosuilstadion, Antwerp
Attendance: 7,992
Referee: Marco Di Bello (Italy)

=== Group E ===
| Pos | Team | Pld | W | D | L | GF | GA | GD | Pts | Qualification | GAL | LAZ | MAR | LOK |
|---|---|---|---|---|---|---|---|---|---|---|---|---|---|---|
| 1 | (Turkey) Galatasaray | 6 | 3 | 3 | 0 | 7 | 3 | +4 | 12 | Advance to round of 16 | — | 1–0 | 4–2 | 1–1 |
| 2 | (Italy) Lazio | 6 | 2 | 3 | 1 | 7 | 3 | +4 | 9 | Advance to knockout round play-offs | 0–0 | — | 0–0 | 2–0 |
| 3 | (France) Marseille | 6 | 1 | 4 | 1 | 6 | 7 | −1 | 7 | Transfer to Europa Conference League | 0–0 | 2–2 | — | 1–0 |
| 4 | (Russia) Lokomotiv Moscow | 6 | 0 | 2 | 4 | 2 | 9 | −7 | 2 | | 0–1 | 0–3 | 1–1 | — |

Source: UEFA
Rules for classification: Group stage tiebreakers
16 September 2021
18:45 (19:45 UTC+3)

| Lokomotiv Moscow (Russia) | 1–1 | (France) Marseille |
|---|---|---|
| Anjorin 89' | Report | Ünder 59' (pen.) |

RZD Arena, Moscow
Attendance: 8,100
Referee: Irfan Peljto (Bosnia and Herzegovina)
16 September 2021
18:45 (19:45 UTC+3)

| Galatasaray (Turkey) | 1–0 | (Italy) Lazio |
|---|---|---|
| Strakosha 67' (o.g.) | Report |

Nef Stadium, Istanbul
Attendance: 15,353
Referee: Matej Jug (Slovenia)

30 September 2021
21:00

| Lazio (Italy) | 2–0 | (Russia) Lokomotiv Moscow |
|---|---|---|
| Bašić 13'; Patric 38' | Report |

Stadio Olimpico, Rome
Attendance: 6,767
Referee: Craig Pawson (England)
30 September 2021
21:00

| Marseille (France) | 0–0 | (Turkey) Galatasaray |
|---|---|---|
| | Report |

Stade Vélodrome, Marseille
Attendance: 49,870
Referee: Paweł Raczkowski (Poland)

21 October 2021
18:45

| Lazio (Italy) | 0–0 | (France) Marseille |
|---|---|---|
| | Report |

Stadio Olimpico, Rome
Attendance: 8,329
Referee: Deniz Aytekin (Germany)
21 October 2021
21:00 (22:00 UTC+3)

| Lokomotiv Moscow (Russia) | 0–1 | (Turkey) Galatasaray |
|---|---|---|
| | Report | Aktürkoğlu 82' |

RZD Arena, Moscow
Attendance: 8,100
Referee: Harald Lechner (Austria)

4 November 2021
18:45 (20:45 UTC+3)

| Galatasaray (Turkey) | 1–1 | (Russia) Lokomotiv Moscow |
|---|---|---|
| Feghouli 43' | Report | Kamano 73' |

Nef Stadium, Istanbul
Attendance: 27,776
Referee: Sandro Schärer (Switzerland)
4 November 2021
21:00

| Marseille (France) | 2–2 | (Italy) Lazio |
|---|---|---|
| Milik 33' (pen.); Payet 82' | Report | Felipe Anderson 45+7'; Immobile 49' |

Stade Vélodrome, Marseille
Attendance: 59,163
Referee: José María Sánchez Martínez (Spain)

25 November 2021
18:45 (20:45 UTC+3)

| Galatasaray (Turkey) | 4–2 | (France) Marseille |
|---|---|---|
| Cicâldău 12'; Ćaleta-Car 30' (o.g.); Feghouli 64'; Babel 83' | Report | Milik 68', 85' |

Nef Stadium, Istanbul
Attendance: 39,758
Referee: Tobias Stieler (Germany)
25 November 2021
18:45 (20:45 UTC+3)

| Lokomotiv Moscow (Russia) | 0–3 | (Italy) Lazio |
|---|---|---|
| | Report | Immobile 56' (pen.), 63' (pen.); Pedro 87' |

RZD Arena, Moscow
Attendance: 8,100
Referee: Artur Soares Dias (Portugal)

9 December 2021
21:00

| Lazio (Italy) | 0–0 | (Turkey) Galatasaray |
|---|---|---|
| | Report |

Stadio Olimpico, Rome
Attendance: 13,178
Referee: Carlos del Cerro Grande (Spain)
9 December 2021
21:00

| Marseille (France) | 1–0 | (Russia) Lokomotiv Moscow |
|---|---|---|
| Milik 35' | Report |

Stade Vélodrome, Marseille
Attendance: 42,614
Referee: Willie Collum (Scotland)

=== Group F ===
| Pos | Team | Pld | W | D | L | GF | GA | GD | Pts | Qualification | RSB | BRA | MID | LUD |
|---|---|---|---|---|---|---|---|---|---|---|---|---|---|---|
| 1 | (Serbia) Red Star Belgrade | 6 | 3 | 2 | 1 | 6 | 4 | +2 | 11 | Advance to round of 16 | — | 2–1 | 0–1 | 1–0 |
| 2 | (Portugal) Braga | 6 | 3 | 1 | 2 | 12 | 9 | +3 | 10 | Advance to knockout round play-offs | 1–1 | — | 3–1 | 4–2 |
| 3 | (Denmark) Midtjylland | 6 | 2 | 3 | 1 | 7 | 7 | 0 | 9 | Transfer to Europa Conference League | 1–1 | 3–2 | — | 1–1 |
| 4 | (Bulgaria) Ludogorets Razgrad | 6 | 0 | 2 | 4 | 3 | 8 | −5 | 2 | | 0–1 | 0–1 | 0–0 | — |

Source: UEFA
Rules for classification: Group stage tiebreakers
16 September 2021
18:45

| Midtjylland (Denmark) | 1–1 | (Bulgaria) Ludogorets Razgrad |
|---|---|---|
| Isaksen 3' | Report | Despodov 32' |

MCH Arena, Herning
Attendance: 6,568
Referee: Aliyar Aghayev (Azerbaijan)
16 September 2021
18:45

| Red Star Belgrade (Serbia) | 2–1 | (Portugal) Braga |
|---|---|---|
| Rodić 75'; Katai 85' (pen.) | Report | Galeno 76' |

Red Star Stadium, Belgrade
Attendance: 24,671
Referee: John Beaton (Scotland)

30 September 2021
21:00 (22:00 UTC+3)

| Ludogorets Razgrad (Bulgaria) | 0–1 | (Serbia) Red Star Belgrade |
|---|---|---|
| | Report | Kanga 64' |

Huvepharma Arena, Razgrad
Attendance: 3,078
Referee: Jérôme Brisard (France)
30 September 2021
21:00 (20:00 UTC+1)

| Braga (Portugal) | 3–1 | (Denmark) Midtjylland |
|---|---|---|
| Galeno 55' (pen.), 90+5'; R. Horta 62' | Report | Evander 19' (pen.) |

Estádio Municipal, Braga
Attendance: 5,449
Referee: Stéphanie Frappart (France)

21 October 2021
18:45 (19:45 UTC+3)

| Ludogorets Razgrad (Bulgaria) | 0–1 | (Portugal) Braga |
|---|---|---|
| | Report | R. Horta 7' |

Huvepharma Arena, Razgrad
Attendance: 2,280
Referee: Kristo Tohver (Estonia)
21 October 2021
18:45

| Midtjylland (Denmark) | 1–1 | (Serbia) Red Star Belgrade |
|---|---|---|
| Dyhr 78' | Report | Ivanić 58' |

MCH Arena, Herning
Attendance: 8,438
Referee: Roi Reinshreiber (Israel)

4 November 2021
21:00 (20:00 UTC+0)

| Braga (Portugal) | 4–2 | (Bulgaria) Ludogorets Razgrad |
|---|---|---|
| Al-Musrati 25'; Medeiros 37'; Galeno 40'; González 73' | Report | Sotiriou 33'; Plastun 79' |

Estádio Municipal, Braga
Attendance: 6,221
Referee: Glenn Nyberg (Sweden)
4 November 2021
21:00

| Red Star Belgrade (Serbia) | 0–1 | (Denmark) Midtjylland |
|---|---|---|
| | Report | Kanga 56' (o.g.) |

Red Star Stadium, Belgrade
Attendance: 23,070
Referee: Tamás Bognár (Hungary)

25 November 2021
18:45

| Midtjylland (Denmark) | 3–2 | (Portugal) Braga |
|---|---|---|
| Sviatchenko 2'; Isaksen 48'; Evander 90+3' (pen.) | Report | R. Horta 43'; Galeno 85' |

MCH Arena, Herning
Attendance: 7,189
Referee: Matej Jug (Slovenia)
25 November 2021
18:45

| Red Star Belgrade (Serbia) | 1–0 | (Bulgaria) Ludogorets Razgrad |
|---|---|---|
| Ivanić 57' | Report |

Red Star Stadium, Belgrade
Attendance: 11,252
Referee: José María Sánchez Martínez (Spain)

9 December 2021
21:00 (22:00 UTC+2)

| Ludogorets Razgrad (Bulgaria) | 0–0 | (Denmark) Midtjylland |
|---|---|---|
| | Report |

Huvepharma Arena, Razgrad
Attendance: 556
Referee: Tobias Stieler (Germany)
9 December 2021
21:00 (20:00 UTC+0)

| Braga (Portugal) | 1–1 | (Serbia) Red Star Belgrade |
|---|---|---|
| Galeno 52' (pen.) | Report | Katai 70' (pen.) |

Estádio Municipal, Braga
Attendance: 5,344
Referee: Marco Guida (Italy)

=== Group G ===
| Pos | Team | Pld | W | D | L | GF | GA | GD | Pts | Qualification | LEV | BET | CEL | FER |
|---|---|---|---|---|---|---|---|---|---|---|---|---|---|---|
| 1 | (Germany) Bayer Leverkusen | 6 | 4 | 1 | 1 | 14 | 5 | +9 | 13 | Advance to round of 16 | — | 4–0 | 3–2 | 2–1 |
| 2 | (Spain) Real Betis | 6 | 3 | 1 | 2 | 12 | 12 | 0 | 10 | Advance to knockout round play-offs | 1–1 | — | 4–3 | 2–0 |
| 3 | (Scotland) Celtic | 6 | 3 | 0 | 3 | 13 | 15 | −2 | 9 | Transfer to Europa Conference League | 0–4 | 3–2 | — | 2–0 |
| 4 | (Hungary) Ferencváros | 6 | 1 | 0 | 5 | 5 | 12 | −7 | 3 | | 1–0 | 1–3 | 2–3 | — |

Source: UEFA
Rules for classification: Group stage tiebreakers
16 September 2021
18:45

| Bayer Leverkusen (Germany) | 2–1 | (Hungary) Ferencváros |
|---|---|---|
| Palacios 37'; Wirtz 69' | Report | R. Mmaee 8' |

BayArena, Leverkusen
Attendance: 11,013
Referee: Andris Treimanis (Latvia)
16 September 2021
18:45

| Real Betis (Spain) | 4–3 | (Scotland) Celtic |
|---|---|---|
| Miranda 32'; Juanmi 35', 53'; Iglesias 51' | Report | Ajeti 15'; Juranović 27' (pen.); Ralston 87' |

Benito Villamarín, Seville
Attendance: 30,893
Referee: Fran Jović (Croatia)

30 September 2021
21:00 (20:00 UTC+1)

| Celtic (Scotland) | 0–4 | (Germany) Bayer Leverkusen |
|---|---|---|
| | Report | Hincapié 25'; Wirtz 35'; Alario 58' (pen.); Adli 90+4' |

Celtic Park, Glasgow
Attendance: 55,436
Referee: Marco Di Bello (Italy)
30 September 2021
21:00

| Ferencváros (Hungary) | 1–3 | (Spain) Real Betis |
|---|---|---|
| Uzuni 44' | Report | Fekir 17'; Wingo 76' (o.g.); Tello 90+5' |

Ferencváros Stadion, Budapest
Attendance: 16,759
Referee: Roi Reinshreiber (Israel)

19 October 2021 (Note: The Celtic v Ferencváros was played on Tuesday instead of Thursday to avoid a scheduling conflict with the home match of Rangers on the same day, as Rangers (league champions) have higher scheduling priority over Celtic (league runners-up) in the Europa League. Typically the order of the Celtic v Ferencváros matches would have been reversed, but this was not possible due to the 2021 United Nations Climate Change Conference taking place in Glasgow.)
16:30 (15:30 UTC+1)

| Celtic (Scotland) | 2–0 | (Hungary) Ferencváros |
|---|---|---|
| Furuhashi 57'; Vécsei 81' (o.g.) | Report |

Celtic Park, Glasgow
Attendance: 50,427
Referee: Jakob Kehlet (Denmark)
21 October 2021
18:45

| Real Betis (Spain) | 1–1 | (Germany) Bayer Leverkusen |
|---|---|---|
| Iglesias 75' (pen.) | Report | Andrich 82' |

Benito Villamarín, Seville
Attendance: 39,230
Referee: Bartosz Frankowski (Poland)

4 November 2021
21:00

| Bayer Leverkusen (Germany) | 4–0 | (Spain) Real Betis |
|---|---|---|
| Diaby 42', 52'; Wirtz 86'; Amiri 90' | Report |

BayArena, Leverkusen
Attendance: 15,208
Referee: Anthony Taylor (England)
4 November 2021
21:00

| Ferencváros (Hungary) | 2–3 | (Scotland) Celtic |
|---|---|---|
| Juranović 11' (o.g.); Uzuni 86' | Report | Furuhashi 3'; Jota 23'; Abada 60' |

Ferencváros Stadion, Budapest
Attendance: 16,501
Referee: Fábio Veríssimo (Portugal)

25 November 2021
18:45

| Bayer Leverkusen (Germany) | 3–2 | (Scotland) Celtic |
|---|---|---|
| Andrich 16', 82'; Diaby 87' | Report | Juranović 40' (pen.); Jota 56' |

BayArena, Leverkusen
Attendance: 19,830
Referee: Anastasios Sidiropoulos (Greece)
25 November 2021
18:45

| Real Betis (Spain) | 2–0 | (Hungary) Ferencváros |
|---|---|---|
| Tello 5'; Canales 52' | Report |

Benito Villamarín, Seville
Attendance: 30,137
Referee: Ruddy Buquet (France)

9 December 2021
21:00 (20:00 UTC+0)

| Celtic (Scotland) | 3–2 | (Spain) Real Betis |
|---|---|---|
| Welsh 3'; Henderson 72'; Turnbull 78' (pen.) | Report | Bain 69' (o.g.); Iglesias 75' |

Celtic Park, Glasgow
Attendance: 54,548
Referee: Daniel Stefański (Poland)
9 December 2021
21:00

| Ferencváros (Hungary) | 1–0 | (Germany) Bayer Leverkusen |
|---|---|---|
| Laïdouni 82' | Report |

Ferencváros Stadion, Budapest
Attendance: 12,127
Referee: Kirill Levnikov (Russia)

=== Group H ===
| Pos | Team | Pld | W | D | L | GF | GA | GD | Pts | Qualification | WHU | DZA | RWI | GNK |
|---|---|---|---|---|---|---|---|---|---|---|---|---|---|---|
| 1 | (England) West Ham United | 6 | 4 | 1 | 1 | 11 | 3 | +8 | 13 | Advance to round of 16 | — | 0–1 | 2–0 | 3–0 |
| 2 | (Croatia) Dinamo Zagreb | 6 | 3 | 1 | 2 | 9 | 6 | +3 | 10 | Advance to knockout round play-offs | 0–2 | — | 3–1 | 1–1 |
| 3 | (Austria) Rapid Wien | 6 | 2 | 0 | 4 | 4 | 9 | −5 | 6 | Transfer to Europa Conference League | 0–2 | 2–1 | — | 0–1 |
| 4 | (Belgium) Genk | 6 | 1 | 2 | 3 | 4 | 10 | −6 | 5 | | 2–2 | 0–3 | 0–1 | — |

Source: UEFA
Rules for classification: Group stage tiebreakers
16 September 2021
18:45

| Dinamo Zagreb (Croatia) | 0–2 | (England) West Ham United |
|---|---|---|
| | Report | Antonio 22'; Rice 50' |

Stadion Maksimir, Zagreb
Attendance: 12,344
Referee: Ruddy Buquet (France)
16 September 2021
18:45

| Rapid Wien (Austria) | 0–1 | (Belgium) Genk |
|---|---|---|
| | Report | Onuachu 90+2' |

Allianz Stadion, Vienna
Attendance: 18,400
Referee: Kristo Tohver (Estonia)

30 September 2021
21:00

| Genk (Belgium) | 0–3 | (Croatia) Dinamo Zagreb |
|---|---|---|
| | Report | Ivanušec 10'; Petković 45+3' (pen.), 67' (pen.) |

Luminus Arena, Genk
Attendance: 11,262
Referee: Mattias Gestranius (Finland)
30 September 2021
21:00 (20:00 UTC+1)

| West Ham United (England) | 2–0 | (Austria) Rapid Wien |
|---|---|---|
| Rice 29'; Benrahma 90+4' | Report |

London Stadium, London
Attendance: 50,004
Referee: Tobias Stieler (Germany)

21 October 2021
18:45

| Rapid Wien (Austria) | 2–1 | (Croatia) Dinamo Zagreb |
|---|---|---|
| Grüll 9'; Hofmann 34' | Report | Oršić 24' |

Allianz Stadion, Vienna
Attendance: 22,300
Referee: Kateryna Monzul (Ukraine)
21 October 2021
21:00 (20:00 UTC+1)

| West Ham United (England) | 3–0 | (Belgium) Genk |
|---|---|---|
| Dawson 45+1'; Diop 57'; Bowen 59' | Report |

London Stadium, London
Attendance: 45,980
Referee: Donatas Rumšas (Lithuania)

4 November 2021
18:45

| Genk (Belgium) | 2–2 | (England) West Ham United |
|---|---|---|
| Paintsil 5'; Souček 88' (o.g.) | Report | Benrahma 59', 82' |

Luminus Arena, Genk
Attendance: 12,239
Referee: Aleksandar Stavrev (North Macedonia)
4 November 2021
21:00

| Dinamo Zagreb (Croatia) | 3–1 | (Austria) Rapid Wien |
|---|---|---|
| Petković 12'; Andrić 34'; Šutalo 83' | Report | Knasmüllner 8' |

Stadion Maksimir, Zagreb
Attendance: 7,835
Referee: John Beaton (Scotland)

25 November 2021
18:45

| Dinamo Zagreb (Croatia) | 1–1 | (Belgium) Genk |
|---|---|---|
| Menalo 35' | Report | Ugbo 45' |

Stadion Maksimir, Zagreb
Attendance: 6,892
Referee: Glenn Nyberg (Sweden)
25 November 2021
18:45

| Rapid Wien (Austria) | 0–2 | (England) West Ham United |
|---|---|---|
| | Report | Yarmolenko 40'; Noble 45+2' (pen.) |

Allianz Stadion, Vienna
Attendance: 0
Referee: Sergey Ivanov (Russia)

9 December 2021
21:00

| Genk (Belgium) | 0–1 | (Austria) Rapid Wien |
|---|---|---|
| | Report | Ljubičić 29' |

Luminus Arena, Genk
Attendance: 10,018
Referee: Tiago Martins (Portugal)
9 December 2021
21:00 (20:00 UTC+0)

| West Ham United (England) | 0–1 | (Croatia) Dinamo Zagreb |
|---|---|---|
| | Report | Oršić 4' |

London Stadium, London
Attendance: 49,401
Referee: Maurizio Mariani (Italy)
