= Jarrod Bowen =

English footballer (born 1996)

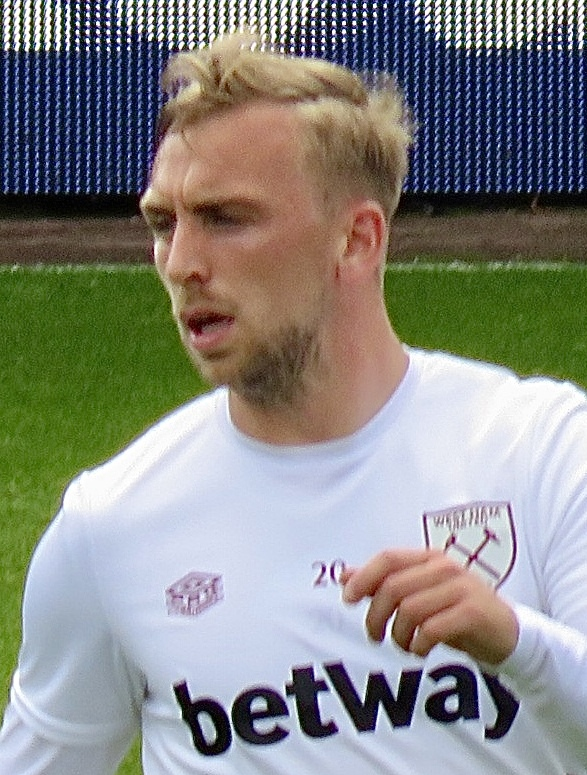
- Bowen with West Ham United in 2023

Personal information
- Full name: Jarrod Bowen
- Date of birth: 20 December 1996 (age 29)
- Place of birth: Leominster, England
- Height: 5 ft 9 in (1.76 m)
- Positions: Right winger; forward

Team information
- Current team: West Ham United
- Number: 20

Youth career
- Leominster Minors
- –2014: Hereford United

Senior career*
| Years | Team | Apps | (Gls) |
| 2014 | Hereford United | 8 | (1) |
| 2014–2020 | Hull City | 124 | (52) |
| 2020– | West Ham United | 247 | (72) |

International career^{‡}
| 2022– | England | 22 | (1) |
Medal record
Men's football
Representing England
UEFA European Championship
| Runner-up | 2024 Germany |
- * Club domestic league appearances and goals as of 17:00, 21 November 2026 (UTC) ‡ National team caps and goals as of 17:10, 1 April 2026 (UTC)

Jarrod Bowen (born 20 December 1996) is an English professional footballer who plays as a right winger or forward for EFL Championship club West Ham United, whom he captains, and the England national team.

He previously played for Hereford United and Hull City, earning a total of 131 appearances and 54 goals for the latter, before joining then-Premier League side West Ham in January 2020, making his debut in February of that year.

== Early life ==
Jarrod Bowen was born on 20 December 1996 in Leominster, Herefordshire. His mother is a teacher at the school that Bowen attended as a child, and his father is a farmer in Herefordshire, who played football at a semi-professional level for Forest Green, Worcester and Hereford. Growing up, Bowen's idol was David Beckham and he supported Manchester United.

== Club career ==
=== Hereford United ===
Bowen began his career at local club Leominster Minors, joining the club at the age of four, staying with the club until under-16 level. After unsuccessful trials at Aston Villa and Cardiff City, Bowen started his career as a scholar at Hereford United. At the age of 17, Bowen was given his first-team debut by manager Peter Beadle after impressing for the youth team that season, playing in a 2–0 loss against Barnet on 22 March 2014. He scored his first career goal on 21 April in Hereford's 3–2 home victory over Alfreton Town.

=== Hull City ===
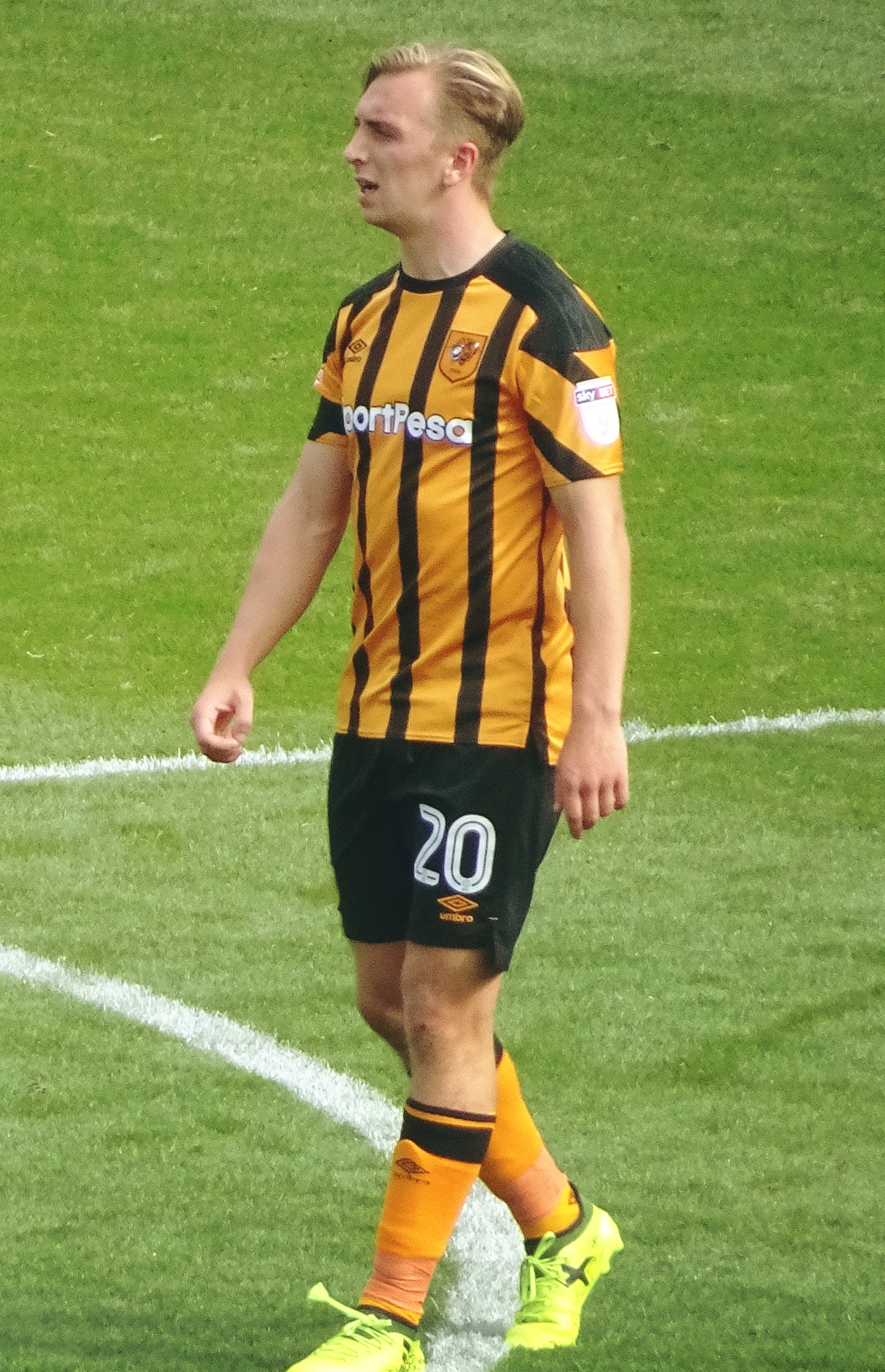
Bowen playing for Hull City in 2017

After Hereford were expelled from the Football Conference in June 2014, Bowen signed for Premier League club Hull City on 8 July on a free transfer. After impressing during pre-season in 2016, he made his debut for Hull on 23 August, playing the full 90 minutes in a 3–1 away victory over Exeter City in the 2016–17 EFL Cup. On 7 November 2016, Bowen signed a new two-year contract with Hull.

Bowen scored his first goal for Hull on 5 August 2017, away to Aston Villa in a 1–1 draw. In September 2017, Bowen signed a new contract that tied him to the club until June 2020. He scored 15 goals in all competitions during the 2017–18 season, which saw him finish as Hull's top scorer. At the annual end of season awards ceremony on 8 May 2018, Bowen won both the Hull City Supporter's Player of the Year and Players' Player of the Year awards.

Bowen was nominated for the EFL Championship Player of the Month award for December 2018, subsequently winning the award in January 2019. In March 2019, he was selected as part of the 2018–19 Championship Team of the Season. He scored 22 goals in all competitions during the 2018–19 season, which saw him finish as Hull's top scorer again. At the annual end of season awards ceremony on 7 May 2019, Bowen won the Player of the Year, Players' Player of the Year and Hull City Supporter's Player of the Year awards.

On 27 November 2019, Bowen scored his 50th goal for Hull as a part of a brace during a 4–0 home win over Preston North End. He would score his last goal for Hull in a 1–0 away win against Sheffield Wednesday on 1 January 2020.

=== West Ham United ===
==== 2020–2022 ====
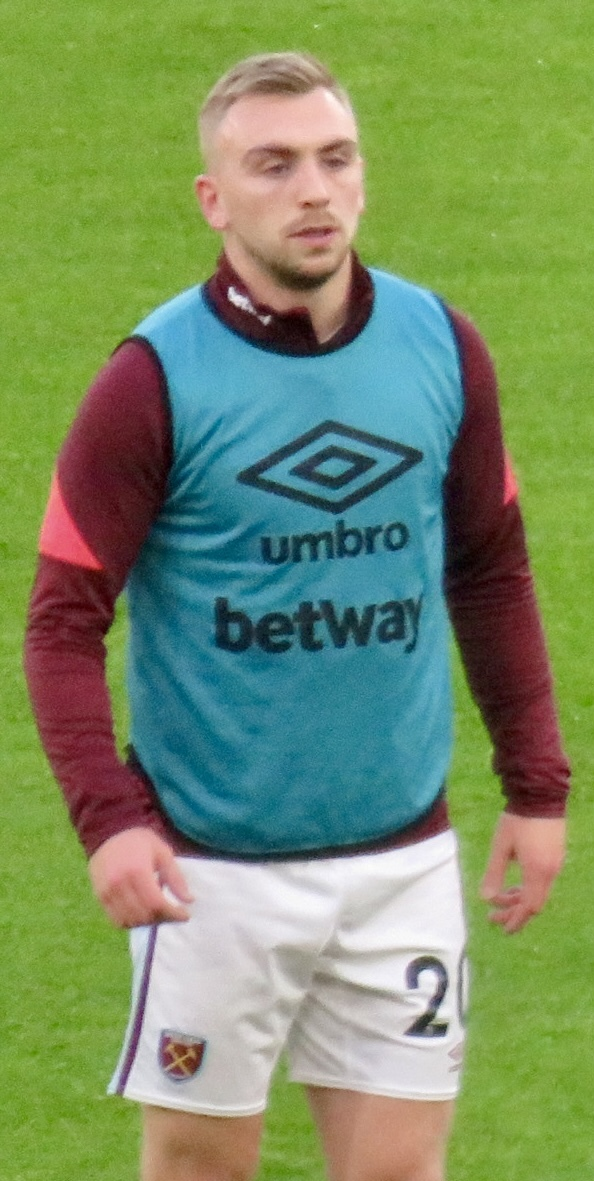
Bowen warming up for West Ham United in 2021

On 31 January 2020, Bowen signed for Premier League club West Ham United on a five-and-a-half-year contract, for a fee reported to be around £22 million. On 29 February, in his first start for West Ham, Bowen scored his first goal for the club, in a 3–1 win against Southampton.

Bowen scored his first goals of the 2020–21 Premier League season on 27 September 2020, with two goals in a 4–0 win against Wolverhampton Wanderers, which was West Ham's first league win of the season. On 4 October, a week later, he added to his tally for the season, scoring the third goal in a 3–0 away win against Leicester City. During the second half of the season, Bowen scored three goals in three consecutive games, in a 3–3 draw against Arsenal and 3–2 wins over Wolves and Leicester, taking his tally up to eight goals for the season.

Bowen scored his first goal in European football during the 2021–22 UEFA Europa League group stage in a 3–0 win over Genk on 21 October 2021. On 8 May 2022, Bowen recorded two assists against Norwich City, becoming the first West Ham player to record ten goals and ten assists in a season since Dimitri Payet in the 2015–2016 season. A day later, Bowen was named as West Ham's players' player of the season. Bowen finished the 2021–22 season as West Ham's top scorer with 18 goals in all competitions, with 12 coming in the Premier League.

==== 2022–present ====
In the 2022–23 season, Bowen scored 13 goals in 54 appearances in all competitions. Six goals were scored in the Europa Conference League, six in the Premier League and a single goal in the FA Cup. On 7 June 2023, during the 2023 Europa Conference League final, Bowen scored the winning goal, in the 90th minute, against Fiorentina to give West Ham their first trophy in 43 years with a 2–1 victory. The following day, Bowen was named in the Team of the Season for the tournament, in which he scored six goals.

On 8 October 2023, Bowen signed a new contract with the club until June 2030. On 22 October, he scored in West Ham's 4–1 away defeat to Aston Villa. This was the fifth successive away game in which he had scored, a feat only previously achieved in the Premier League by Thierry Henry and Mohamed Salah. On 4 November, he scored again in an away game to break the record as West Ham lost 3–2 away to Brentford. Bowen scored his first career hat-trick in a 4–2 victory over Brentford on 26 February, including two goals within the first ten minutes of the game. He became the first West Ham player to score a Premier League hat-trick at the London Stadium. On 27 April 2024, Bowen scored the opening goal in a 2–2 draw with Liverpool. His goal was his 16th Premier League goal of the season, equalling a record held by Paolo Di Canio and achieved in the 1999–2000 season, for the most goals scored by a West Ham player in a season in the Premier League. On 11 May 2024, Bowen was presented with the Hammer of the Year award.

On 15 August 2024, Bowen was named as West Ham's club captain, succeeding defender Kurt Zouma. On 26 December, Bowen scored his 100th league goal in a 1–0 win at Southampton. On 22 February 2025, Bowen scored his 50th Premier League goal for West Ham in a 1–0 away win at Arsenal.

On 24 January 2026, Bowen converted a penalty and provided an assist in a 3–1 win over Sunderland, becoming the club's top player for goal involvements with 103 including 63 goals and 40 assists, breaking previous record of Michail Antonio. On 24 May, despite a 3–0 win over Leeds United, West Ham got relegated to the EFL Championship for the first time in fifteen years following Tottenham's 1–0 win over Everton, saving Tottenham from relegation.

== International career ==
Bowen received his first senior call-up for England on 24 May 2022 for the following month's Nations League games against Hungary, Germany and Italy. On 4 June 2022, Bowen made his debut for England, playing the full 90 minutes in a 1–0 loss against Hungary, drawing praise from The Daily Telegraph for his performance. He was not included in the England squad for the 2022 FIFA World Cup played in Qatar in November and December 2022. His club manager, David Moyes, said that Bowen's form had suffered following the omission.

Bowen was recalled to England's squad for the October 2023 internationals against Australia and Italy. On 13 October, he was named in the starting line-up for England's 1–0 win over Australia, making his first career appearance at Wembley Stadium.

On 6 June 2024, Bowen was named in England's squad for UEFA Euro 2024. In the team's opening match, Bowen made his tournament debut as a 76th-minute substitute for Bukayo Saka as England beat Serbia 1–0 in Gelsenkirchen.

On 17 November 2024, Bowen scored his first England goal, scoring England's fourth in a 5–0 win over the Republic of Ireland. Described by The Athletic as a "superb set-piece routine", Bowen's goal came immediately after his introduction as a substitute, with the ball being in play for only three seconds.

== Style of play ==
Regarded as a quick, direct, mobile, energetic player with good technique and an eye for goal, Bowen is predominantly known for his speed, movement, clinical finishing, agility and ball control, as well as his ability to use both his pace and flair on the ball to create scoring opportunities for himself or his teammates. A versatile forward, he primarily plays as a winger on the right flank, a position which allows him to cut into the centre onto his stronger left foot, and either shoot on goal or play quick exchanges with other players and make runs in behind the defence towards goal. He can also play in the centre, behind the main striker as either an attacking midfielder or second striker. In 2023, he began playing as a central striker while Michail Antonio was injured, impressing manager David Moyes with his performance and versatility.

== Personal life ==
Bowen's father, Sam, is a former semi-professional footballer. While at Merthyr Tydfil, for whom he scored five goals on his debut in August 1996, Sam won a trial with West Ham under the management of Harry Redknapp, before the move fell through due to Merthyr's financial demands for Sam's services. Sam also scored hat-tricks on his debuts for Forest Green Rovers and Worcester City, leading to the South Wales Argus labelling him a "debut king" upon his transfer to Newport County in January 2004.

In October 2021, Bowen was reported to be in a relationship with reality television personality Dani Dyer. On 20 January 2023, the couple announced they were expecting twins. Their twin daughters, Star and Summer, were born on 22 May 2023. They announced their engagement on 21 July 2024 and married on 30 May 2025.

In Bowen's spare time he enjoys playing golf and Football Manager. He is also a supporter of the NFL team the New England Patriots. He also still supports his former grass roots club Leominster Minors donating kits and equipment.

In April 2026, Bowen agreed to help pay for pitch repairs at Hereford, the phoenix club of his first professional club, Hereford United, where his uncle Ben is groundsman.

== Career statistics ==
=== Club ===
As of match played 31 October 2026

Appearances and goals by club, season and competition
| Club | Season | League | | | FA Cup | | EFL Cup | | Europe | | Total | |
| Club | Season | Division | Apps | Goals | Apps | Goals | Apps | Goals | Apps | Goals | Apps | Goals |
|---|---|---|---|---|---|---|---|---|---|---|---|---|
| Hereford United | 2013–14 | Conference Premier | 8 | 1 | 0 | 0 | — | | — | | 8 | 1 |
| Hull City | 2014–15 | Premier League | 0 | 0 | 0 | 0 | 0 | 0 | 0 | 0 | 0 | 0 |
| Hull City | 2015–16 | Championship | 0 | 0 | 0 | 0 | 0 | 0 | — | | 0 | 0 |
| Hull City | 2016–17 | Premier League | 7 | 0 | 0 | 0 | 2 | 0 | — | | 9 | 0 |
| Hull City | 2017–18 | Championship | 42 | 14 | 2 | 1 | 0 | 0 | — | | 44 | 15 |
| Hull City | 2018–19 | Championship | 46 | 22 | 0 | 0 | 0 | 0 | — | | 46 | 22 |
| Hull City | 2019–20 | Championship | 29 | 16 | 2 | 0 | 1 | 1 | — | | 32 | 17 |
| Hull City | Total | | 124 | 52 | 4 | 1 | 3 | 1 | 0 | 0 | 131 | 54 |
| West Ham United | 2019–20 | Premier League | 13 | 1 | — | | — | | — | | 13 | 1 |
| West Ham United | 2020–21 | Premier League | 38 | 8 | 2 | 0 | 0 | 0 | — | | 40 | 8 |
| West Ham United | 2021–22 | Premier League | 36 | 12 | 3 | 2 | 3 | 1 | 9 (Note: Appearances in UEFA Europa League) | 3 | 51 | 18 |
| West Ham United | 2022–23 | Premier League | 38 | 6 | 3 | 1 | 1 | 0 | 12 (Note: Appearances in UEFA Europa Conference League) | 6 | 54 | 13 |
| West Ham United | 2023–24 | Premier League | 34 | 16 | 1 | 1 | 2 | 2 | 7 | 1 | 44 | 20 |
| West Ham United | 2024–25 | Premier League | 34 | 13 | 0 | 0 | 2 | 1 | — | | 36 | 14 |
| West Ham United | 2025–26 | Premier League | 38 | 9 | 3 | 2 | 1 | 0 | — | | 42 | 11 |
| West Ham United | 2026–27 | Championship | 13 | 7 | 0 | 0 | 3 | 2 | — | | 16 | 9 |
| West Ham United | Total | | 244 | 72 | 12 | 6 | 12 | 6 | 28 | 10 | 296 | 94 |
| Career total | | | 376 | 125 | 16 | 7 | 15 | 7 | 28 | 10 | 435 | 149 |

=== International ===
As of match played 31 March 2026

Appearances and goals by national team and year
| National team | Year | Apps | Goals |
|---|---|---|---|
| England | 2022 | 4 | 0 |
| England | 2023 | 1 | 0 |
| England | 2024 | 9 | 1 |
| England | 2025 | 6 | 0 |
| England | 2026 | 2 | 0 |
| Total | | 22 | 1 |

As of match played 31 March 2026
England score listed first, score column indicates score after each Bowen goal

List of international goals scored by Jarrod Bowen
| No. | Date | Venue | Cap | Opponent | Score | Result | Competition | Ref. |
|---|---|---|---|---|---|---|---|---|
| 1 | 17 November 2024 | Wembley Stadium, London, England | 14 | Republic of Ireland | 4–0 | 5–0 | 2024–25 UEFA Nations League B | |

== Honours ==
West Ham United

- UEFA Europa Conference League: 2022–23

England

- UEFA European Championship runner-up: 2024

Individual

- EFL Championship Player of the Month: December 2018, November 2019
- English Football League Team of the Season: 2018–19
- UEFA Europa Conference League Team of the Season: 2022–23
- Hull City Supporters' Player of the Year: 2017–18
- Hull City Players' Player of the Year: 2017–18
- West Ham United Players' Player of the Year: 2021–22
- West Ham United Hammer of the Year: 2023–24
