= Sam Bowen (footballer, born 1976) =

English footballer

Personal information
- Date of birth: April 1976 (age 50)
- Position: Striker

Senior career*
Years	Team	Apps	(Gls)
- Westfields
- Moor Green
- Westfields
1996–1997	Merthyr Tydfil		
1997–2000	Worcester City		
2000	Evesham Town		
2000	Halesowen Town		
- Westfields
2003	→ Forest Green Rovers (loan)		
2003–2004	Bromsgrove Rovers		
2004	Newport County		
2004	Westfields		
2004	Newtown		
2010	Leominster Town		
2011	Westfields		
2017–2018	Kington Town		

Managerial career
- 2010: Leominster Town
- 2017–2018: Kington Town
- * Club domestic league appearances and goals

Sam Bowen (born April 1976) is an English former football player and coach.

== Career ==
Bowen, a striker, spent his early career with Westfields, Moor Green and Merthyr Tydfil. At Merthyr Tydfil he scored 5 goals on his debut, and had a trial at Premier League club West Ham United.

He next played for Worcester City, scoring a hat-trick on his debut, and scoring a total of 53 goals in 97 matches for the club. After leaving Worcester, he played for Evesham Town, and Halesowen Town, scoring on his debut for Halesowen.

In January 2003 he left football to begin a career as a rugby player. He returned to football with Westfields, moving on loan to Forest Green Rovers in December 2003, scoring a hat-trick on his debut for the club.

He also played for Bromsgrove Rovers, before signing for Newport County in January 2004, scoring 5 goals in 13 appearances before being released in the summer of 2004.

After returning to Westfields, he signed for Welsh club Newtown in September 2004. By December 2011, he was again playing for Westfields.

He also spent time as player-manager at both Leominster Town, and Kington Town.

== Personal life ==
Bowen worked as a farmer. He is the father of fellow footballer Jarrod Bowen, and has another son and daughter. Jarrod trained with his father, even as a professional player.
