= Trevor Bumstead =

English Association football coach

Personal information
- Full name: Trevor Bumstead
- Date of birth: January 1980 (age 46)
- Place of birth: Essex, England
- Height: 5 ft 10 in (1.78 m)

Team information
- Current team: Claremont School (Academy Manager)

Managerial career
- Years: Team
- 2002–2004: Southend United (Youth Coach)
- 2004–2014: West Ham United (Lead Youth Development Phase Coach)
- 2014–2019: Arsenal U16
- 2018: Arsenal U18
- 2019–2026: Buckswood School
- 2026–: Claremont School (Academy Manager)

Trevor Bumstead is an English Association football coach. He holds the UEFA A Licence.

== Coaching career ==
=== Southend United ===
Bumstead was born in Essex. He began coaching Southend United youth at their centre of excellence in 2002 and was responsible for the Under 9's.

=== West Ham United ===
In 2004 Bumstead moved to West Ham United under Academy Manager Tony Carr as the Lead Youth Development Phase Coach, responsible for players between the Under 12 and Under 16 age groups. A number of players cite Bumstead as a major influence in their development, including Declan Rice, Reece Oxford, Sebastian Lletget and Grady Diangana.

=== Scottish Football Association ===
In July 2012, Bumstead headed a conference of over 120 coaches from across the country as part of the Scottish FA West Region Coaching Conference at Toryglen Regional Football Centre.

=== Arsenal ===
Bumstead joined Arsenal in 2014 under Academy Manager Andries Jonker initially to work with the Under 15s as head coach, before taking over the Under 16s. Throughout his time at the academy, he worked closely with future stars Bukayo Saka, Folarin Balogun, Emile Smith Rowe and Yunus Musah. In 2017 his Under 16 side won the Liam Brady Cup, beating Bayern Munich, Manchester United and Juventus respectively.

During his tenure with the Under 16s, several players and ex-players were assigned to work alongside Bumstead and his team as they studied for their UEFA coaching licenses, most notably Mikel Arteta, Jack Wilshere, Per Mertesacker, Freddie Ljungberg and Thierry Henry.

Following the departure of Kwame Ampadu to AS Monaco in 2018, Bumstead took temporary charge of Arsenal U18 until a permanent replacement was found.

=== Buckswood School ===
He was Head of Football at Buckswood School from 2019–2026.

=== Claremont School ===
In September 2026 Bumstead joined Claremont School in East Sussex as Academy Manager of their International Football Programme.
