= Declan Rice =

English footballer (born 1999)

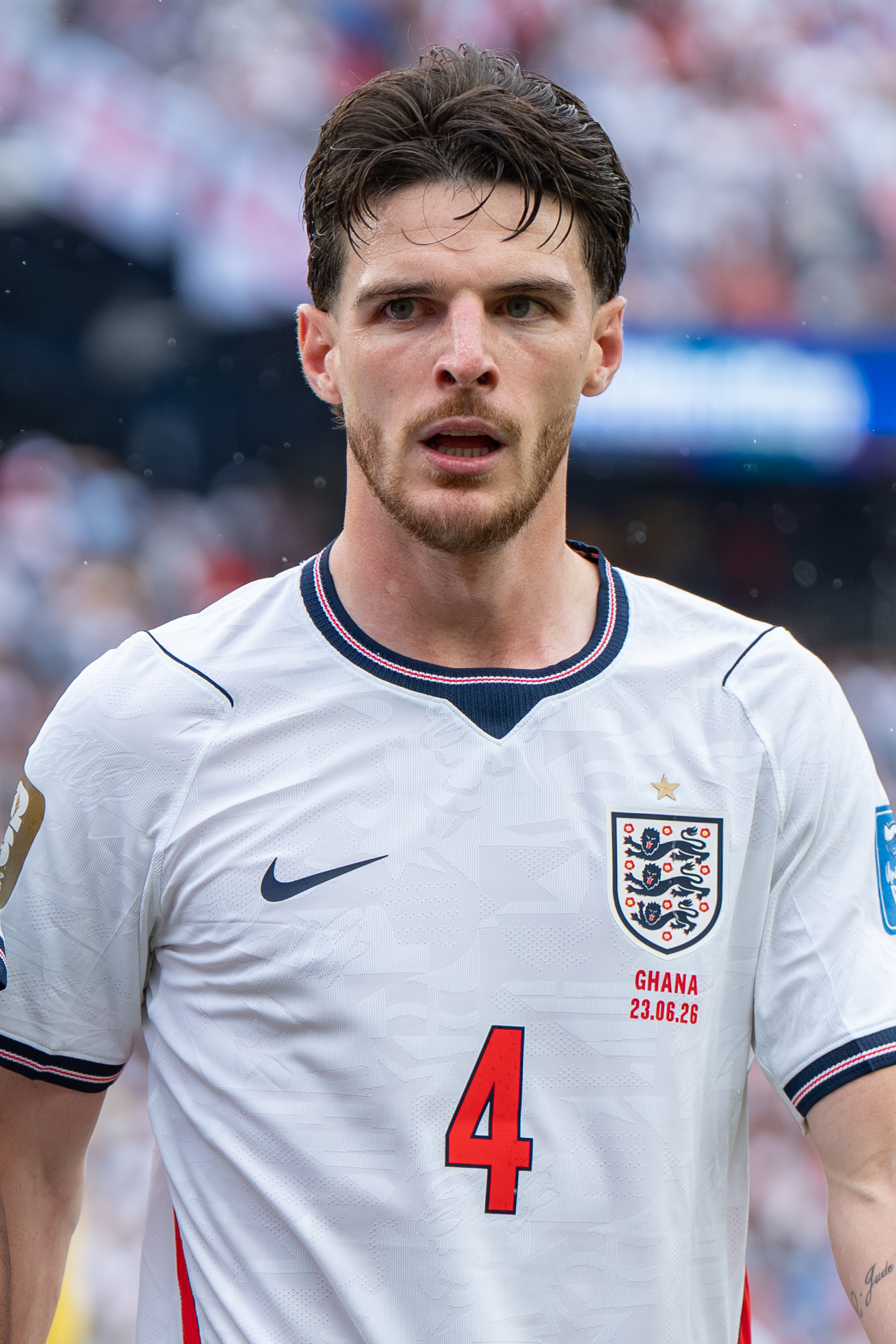
- Rice with England in 2026

Personal information
- Full name: Declan Rice
- Date of birth: 14 January 1999 (age 27)
- Place of birth: Kingston upon Thames, London, England
- Height: 6 ft 2 in (1.88 m)
- Position: Midfielder

Team information
- Current team: Arsenal
- Number: 41

Youth career
- 2006–2013: Chelsea
- 2013–2015: West Ham United

Senior career*
Years	Team	Apps	(Gls)
2015–2023	West Ham United	204	(10)
2023–	Arsenal	120	(15)

International career^{‡}
2015–2016	Republic of Ireland U17	6	(2)
2016–2017	Republic of Ireland U19	6	(0)
2017–2018	Republic of Ireland U21	5	(0)
2018–2019	Republic of Ireland	3	(0)
2019–	England	82	(8)
Medal record
Men's football
Representing England
FIFA World Cup
Third place	2026 Canada–Mexico–US
UEFA European Championship
Runner-up	2020 Europe
Runner-up	2024 Germany
UEFA Nations League
Third place	2019 Portugal
- * Club domestic league appearances and goals as of 19:35, 21 November 2026 (UTC) ‡ National team caps and goals as of 21:50, 15 November 2026 (UTC)

Declan Rice (born 14 January 1999) is an English professional footballer who plays as a defensive midfielder for Premier League club Arsenal and the England national team. Known for his versatility, stamina, ball-carrying and tackling, he is considered one of the best midfielders in the world.

Rice began his professional career at West Ham United, having been released by Chelsea's academy, and established himself as a key first-team player by 2017. In 2022, he succeeded Mark Noble as club captain, and led the club to a UEFA Europa Conference League title the following year, as well as being named the competition's Player of the Season. After making 245 appearances for West Ham, Rice was signed by Arsenal in July 2023 for a club record fee of £100 million, making him the joint-most-expensive English player in history and going on to help them win their first Premier League title in 22 years.

Eligible to play for England or the Republic of Ireland, Rice represented the latter internationally at both youth and senior levels prior to 2019. He subsequently changed his national allegiance and made himself available for selection by England. Rice made his England debut in 2019 and was included in the squads for UEFA Euro 2020, the 2022 FIFA World Cup, UEFA Euro 2024 and the 2026 FIFA World Cup, finishing runner-up in both European Championship editions he participated in.

== Early life and career ==
Declan Rice was born on 14 January 1999 in Kingston upon Thames, London, to father Sean and mother Stephanie. He has two older brothers, Connor and Jordan. His paternal grandparents were from Douglas, County Cork, in Ireland. He began playing football at Dickerage Lane Adventure Playground in Kingston.

In 2006, he joined the Chelsea Academy as a seven-year-old, where he befriended future England teammate Mason Mount. In 2013, after his release at age 14, he joined the West Ham United Academy after a trial period in the spring. Academy coach Trevor Bumstead stated it was Rice's determination and persistence that helped him break through the ranks at West Ham. Rice won the Premier League Cup in 2016 with the under-21s and the Premier League 2 Division 2 in 2020 with the under-23s.

== Club career ==
=== West Ham United ===
==== 2015–2020 ====
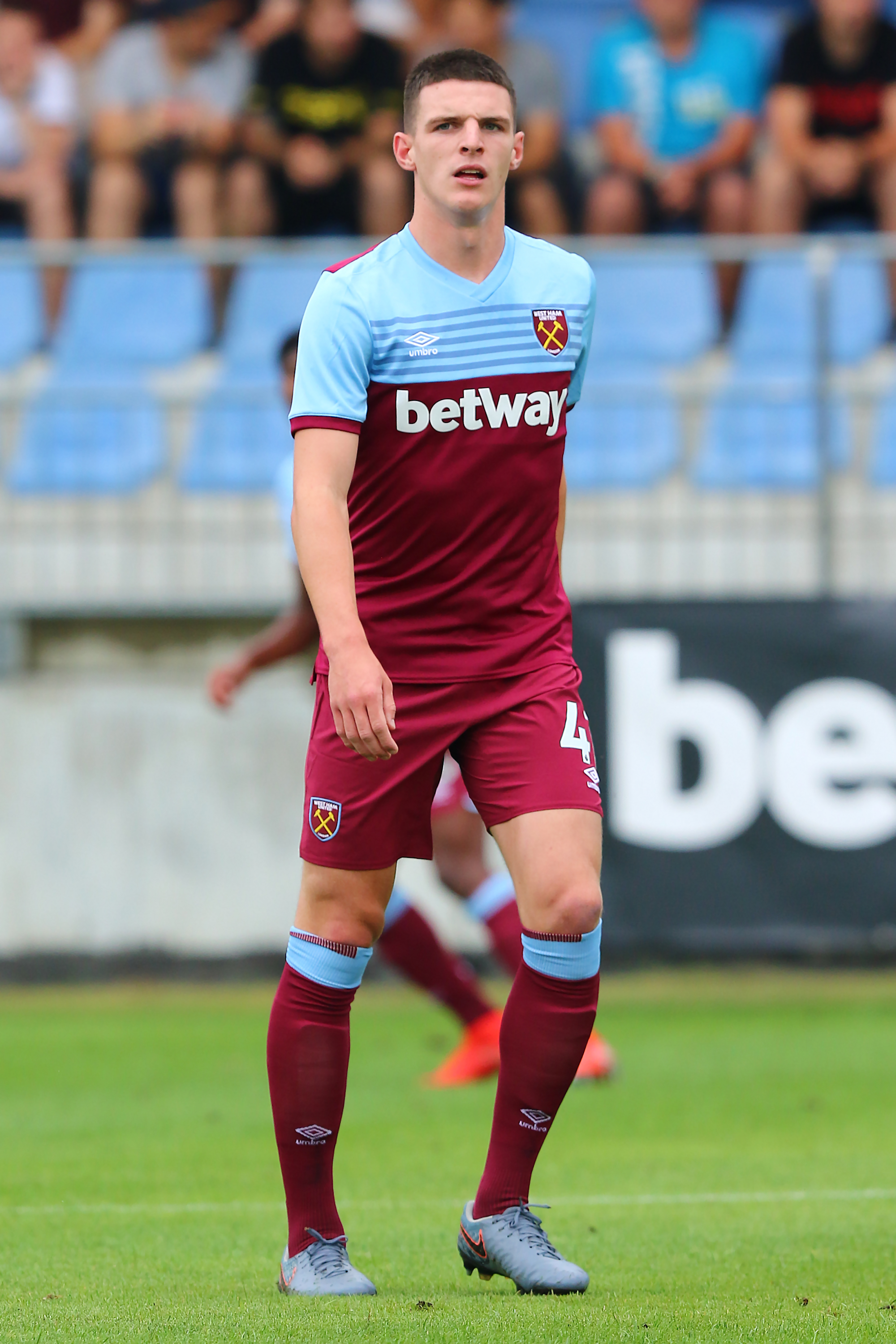
Rice playing for West Ham United in 2019

On 16 December 2015, two years after joining West Ham United at youth level, Rice signed his first professional contract with the club. Rice received his first call-up to the West Ham senior squad for the games against Sunderland and Everton in April 2017, after impressing in the under-23 team. He made his senior debut against Burnley on the last day of the 2016–17 Premier League season, coming on as a 91st-minute substitute for Edimilson Fernandes in a 2–1 away win, five days after captaining the under-23s to promotion with a 2–1 win away to Newcastle United. His first-team debut came on 19 August 2017 in a 3–2 defeat at Southampton. In April 2018, Rice was named as runner-up for the 2017–18 Hammer of the Year award behind Marko Arnautović.

On 22 December 2018, he made his 50th appearance for West Ham, becoming the first player to do so while still a teenager since Michael Carrick. On 28 December 2018, Rice signed a new contract until 2024 with the option of an additional year. On 12 January 2019, Rice scored his first goal for West Ham and was named man of the match in a 1–0 win against Arsenal, in West Ham's 50th Premier League game at the London Stadium. On 20 April, Rice was named on the shortlist for the PFA Young Player of the Year award, which was eventually awarded to Rice's England teammate Raheem Sterling. At the end of the 2018–19 season, he was named the Players' Player of the Year and won the award for Individual Performance of the Season, for his match winning game against Arsenal, and was named the Young Hammer of the Year for the third-consecutive season.

On 28 December 2019, Rice captained West Ham for the first time, at age 20, in a 2–1 home loss against Leicester City. He scored his first and only Premier League goal of the season on 17 July 2020, with an outside-the-box strike against Watford, in a 3–1 win. In the 2019–20 season, Rice played every minute of West Ham's 38 league games. He was in the Premier League's top five players for both tackles and interceptions, leading West Ham players in both categories and making more passes than any other teammate. He was named Hammer of the Year for the first time in 2020.

==== 2020–2023 ====
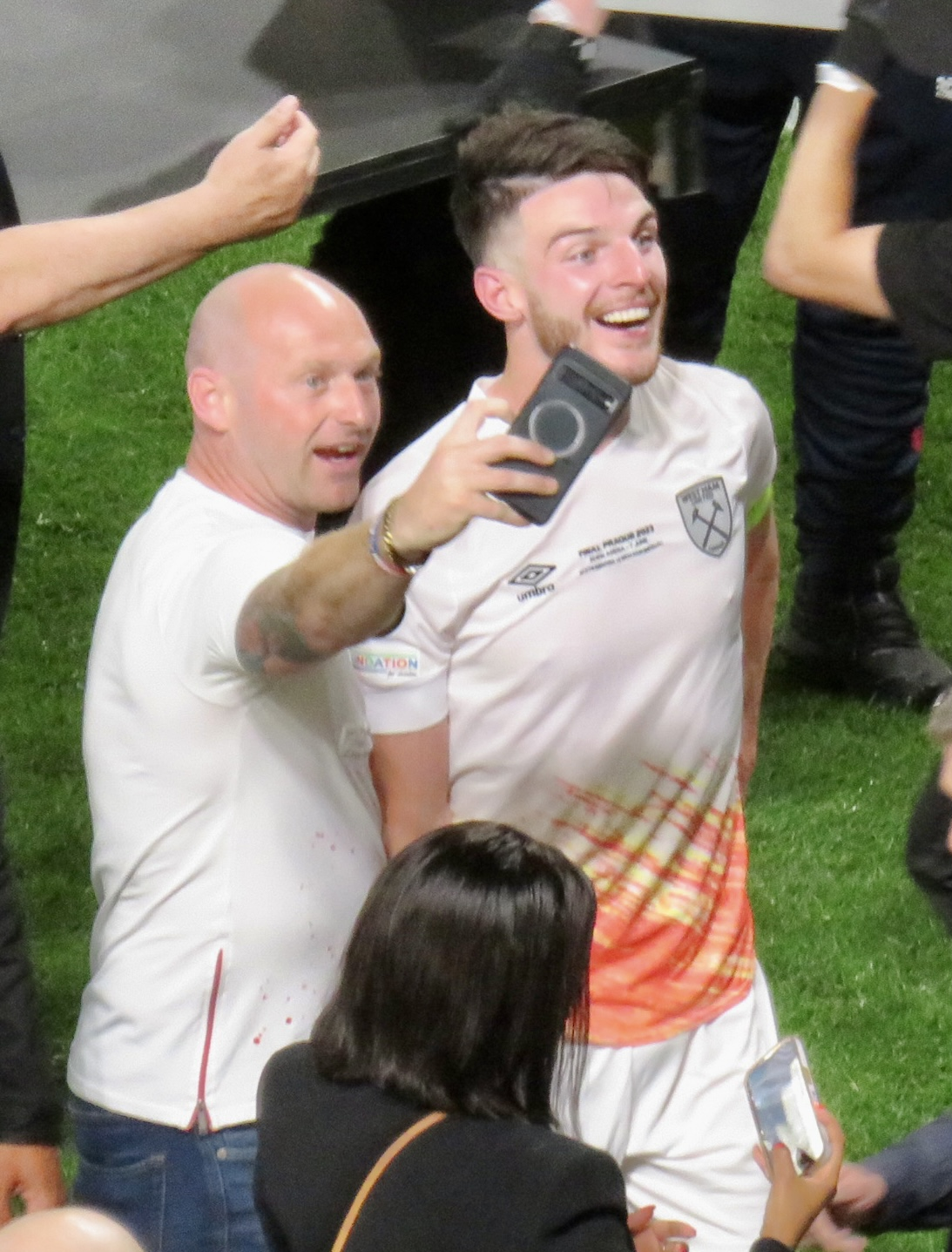
Rice (right) celebrates on the pitch after winning the 2023 UEFA Europa Conference League final with West Ham United

On 15 February 2021, Rice scored his first goal of the season when he converted a penalty and put the team in the lead against Sheffield United in a home league win that ended 3–0. In April 2021, having played in all of West Ham's games so far in the 2020–21 season, Rice was ruled out for four weeks with a knee injury picked up on international duty with England.

On 16 September 2021, Rice made his European debut and scored his debut European goal in a 2–0 away victory over Dinamo Zagreb in the Europa League.

On 9 May 2022, Rice was named as Hammer of the Year for a second time. Following West Ham's Europa League campaign, which saw them reach the semi-final, Rice was named in the 2021–22 UEFA Europa League Team of the Year alongside teammate Craig Dawson. Following the retirement of Mark Noble in May 2022, Rice was named as captain of West Ham.

On 16 October 2022, Rice opened his goalscoring account for the season, scoring a curling effort from 22 yards (20 m) to secure West Ham a point in a 1–1 draw against Southampton. On 20 April 2023, Rice scored West Ham's third in a 4–1 win in the UEFA Europa Conference League against Belgian side Gent, carrying the ball for more than 50 metres (55 yd) before finishing past Gent goalkeeper Davy Roef, resulting in a goal labelled "perhaps the standout strike of Rice's career" by The Daily Telegraph.

In May 2023, he was again named Hammer of the Year, for the 2022–23 season. On 8 June 2023, Rice was named as the Europa Conference League's player of the season by UEFA as Rice captained West Ham to their first major European trophy since 1965 after a 2–1 win against Fiorentina in the final a day prior. During the 2022–23 season, Rice won possession more than any other Premier League player. He also made the most interceptions of all Premier League players.

Rice left West Ham in July 2023, joining Arsenal. He played 245 games for West Ham, scoring 15 goals. He is one of only three West Ham captains, along with Bobby Moore and Billy Bonds, to have captained the club to a major trophy. West Ham chairman David Sullivan said that the club did not want to sell the player, stating that they wished to build the team around him, but that Rice had made it clear he wanted to move on. Rice said of the transfer: "Ultimately, though, it has only ever been about my ambition to play at the very highest level of the game."

=== Arsenal ===
==== 2023–24 ====
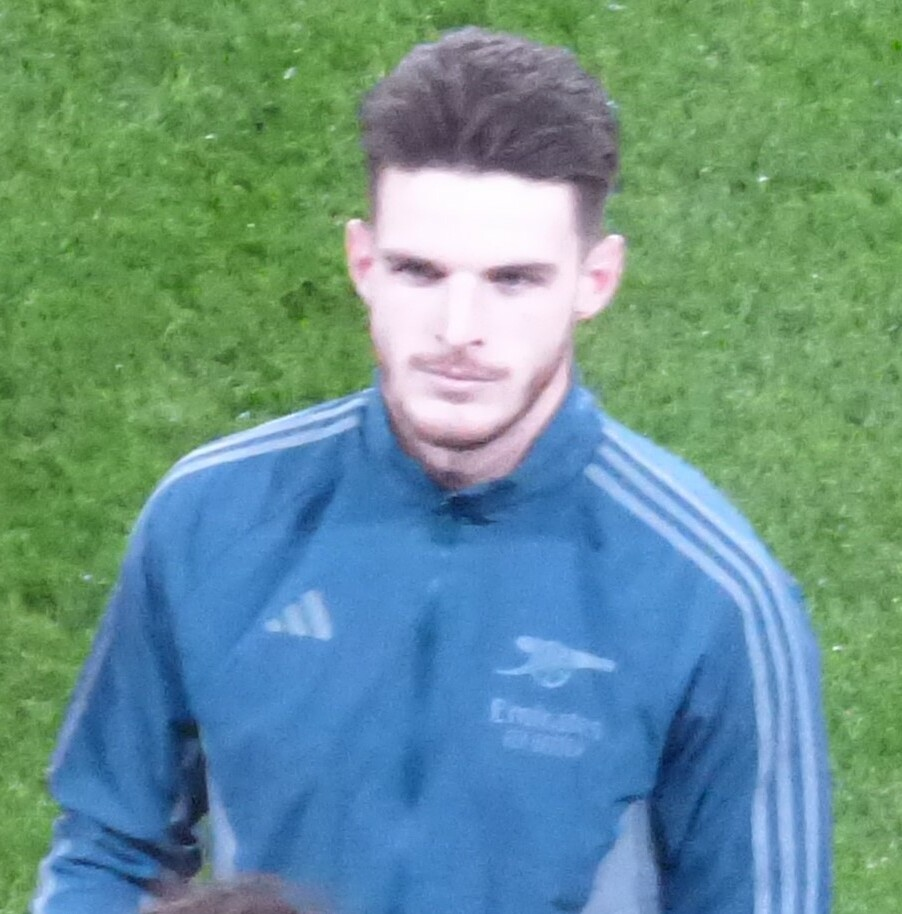
Rice playing for Arsenal in 2023

On 15 July 2023, Rice signed for Premier League club Arsenal on a long-term contract. It was reported that the transfer fee was a club-record initial £100m, potentially rising by £5m, in add-ons, making him the most expensive English player, equalling the previous record held by Jack Grealish. The structure of the transfer was given as West Ham receiving £50m immediately and a further £50m in the summer of 2024. They will also receive £1m every time Arsenal qualify for a place in the Champions League during his time at the club and £1m if he plays 60 per cent of games in a season, with those payments capped at £5m.

Rice made his first debut for Arsenal in a preseason match against the 2023 MLS All Star team on 19 July 2023.Rice made his Arsenal season debut on 6 August against Manchester City in the 2023 FA Community Shield, which Arsenal won 4–1 on penalties after a 1–1 draw. On 12 August, Rice started in Arsenal's opening match of the 2023–24 Premier League season, a 2–1 home win over Nottingham Forest. On 3 September, he scored his first goal for Arsenal, in stoppage time to grant his team a 2–1 lead against Manchester United in a match which ended in a 3–1 win.

Rice was announced as a nominee for The Best FIFA Men's Player based on his performances for both London clubs and the national team. On 11 February, Rice scored his first goal against his former club, West Ham United, in a 6–0 victory at the London Stadium, which was West Ham's worst home defeat in the league since 1963 against Blackburn Rovers.

==== 2024–25 ====
On 21 December 2024, Rice came off the bench against Crystal Palace, scoring and providing an assist to teammate Gabriel Martinelli in the 5–1 away rout of the Eagles. On 22 January 2025, Rice scored his first UEFA Champions League goal in 3–0 victory over Dinamo Zagreb. On 8 April, he netted two direct free kick goals in a 3–0 home win over reigning champions Real Madrid in the first leg of the Champions League quarter-finals, becoming the first player ever to score two free kicks in a Champions League knockout phase match. On 18 May, he scored the only goal in a 1–0 win over Newcastle United, securing Arsenal's runner-up finish in the Premier League and qualification for the UEFA Champions League in the following season. Following another successful individual campaign with Arsenal, Rice was voted as the Arsenal Player of the Season. He was also selected in the UEFA Champions League Team of the Season by UEFA's Technical Observer Group, and nominated for the Premier League Player of the Season award.

On 20 June 2025, it was announced that Rice was one of six nominees for the PFA Players' Player of the Year.

==== 2025–26 ====
On 5 October 2025, Declan Rice scored his first goal of the season against former club West Ham United in a 2–0 Premier League home win. On 1 November, he netted in a 2–0 away victory against Burnley, earning himself Man of the match for his performance. On 4 December, he was nominated for the Premier League Player of the Month award for November. Rice was an important part of Arsenal winning the 2025–26 Premier League title.

== International career ==
=== Republic of Ireland ===
Although born in London, Rice was eligible to play for Ireland as his paternal grandparents are from Cork. On 19 March 2017, Rice was named Republic of Ireland U17 player of the year. On 23 May 2017, only days after his Premier League debut, Rice was named in the Republic of Ireland squad to play friendlies against Mexico and Uruguay and a World Cup qualifier at home to Austria. He made his senior debut on 23 March 2018 in a 1–0 defeat to Turkey.

In August 2018, Rice was omitted from the squad to play Wales by manager Martin O'Neill, who said that Rice was considering switching to play for England after being approached by them. By November 2018, having been omitted from three squads selected by O'Neill, Rice said he was no closer in deciding whether to play for Ireland or England. In December 2018, Rice met with new Ireland manager Mick McCarthy and his assistant, Robbie Keane. McCarthy said that Rice was a potential future captain of Ireland and that he would build the team around Rice should he decide to play for the country.

=== England ===
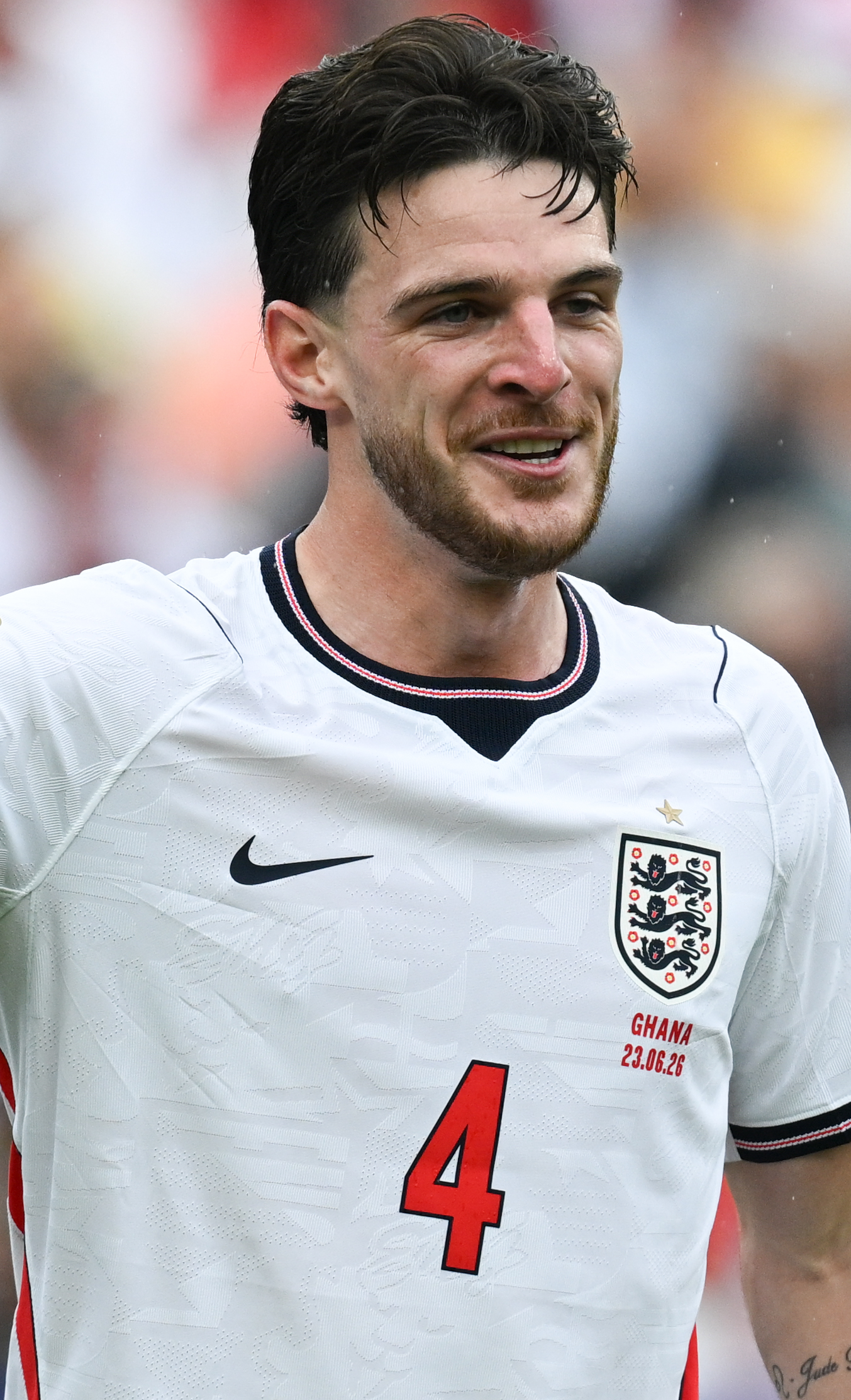
Rice playing for England at the 2026 FIFA World Cup

On 13 February 2019, Rice pledged his future to England. On 5 March, his change of allegiance was confirmed by FIFA. On 13 March, he was called up by England for their forthcoming UEFA Euro 2020 qualifying matches against the Czech Republic and Montenegro. He made his debut on 22 March as a 63rd-minute substitute against the Czech Republic at Wembley.

On 25 March 2019, England manager Gareth Southgate handed Rice his first start for the national side during a 5–1 victory over Montenegro. Following Rice's successful season, he was handed a place in the England squad for the 2019 UEFA Nations League Finals. In September 2019, Rice said that he had received online death threats after switching allegiance. He was the first player to play for both countries since Jack Reynolds in the 1890s. Rice was named in the England squad for UEFA Euro 2020. Rice played in all seven games for England at Euro 2020 where they finished runner-up in the final to Italy.

Rice was included in the England squad for the 2022 FIFA World Cup. He started all five matches as England reached the quarter-finals, losing 2–1 to France.

Ahead of his 50th cap for the senior side, it was announced that Rice would captain England for the first time, against Belgium in March 2024. On 6 June, he was named in England's 26-man squad for UEFA Euro 2024. He was the only outfield player at the tournament to play every minute of every match as England reached the final, where they were beaten 2–1 by Spain.

On 22 May 2026, Rice was selected in the 26-man squad for the 2026 FIFA World Cup. In the team's opening match of the tournament, Rice assisted Harry Kane's second goal from a corner kick as England defeated Croatia 4–2. During England's 2–1 quarter-final victory over Norway, Rice started the match despite suffering from illness and a neural issue affecting his hamstring and lower back. Manager Thomas Tuchel revealed that Rice had spent most of the previous three days in bed and was substituted at half-time after struggling in the heat. Rice captained his national team against France in the third-place match, scoring a goal and providing an assist in a 6–4 victory. His goal, scored after just 134 seconds, became the second-fastest goal by an English player at the World Cup, behind only Bryan Robson, who scored after 28 seconds.

== Style of play ==
Rice plays predominantly as a defensive midfielder and is known for his athleticism and tackling ability. In more recent times, he has begun to build a reputation as a more complete midfielder due to his ball carrying skills and ability to score goals from range, which has seen him be deployed in a more offensive role on occasion as a number eight. He has also been praised in the media for his passing ability.

== Personal life ==
Rice has been a close friend of Mason Mount since childhood from when they played together at Chelsea's academy. His cousin, Finley Munroe, is also a professional footballer for Middlesbrough.

In March 2019, Rice apologised for pro-Irish Republican Army comments he made on social media in 2015.

In August 2022, Rice confirmed the birth of his first child, a son, with long-term girlfriend, Lauren Fryer. Rice has a tattoo of his son's name on his arm. It was reported in 2024 that Fryer had removed posts from her Instagram account after being subjected to abuse from online trolls. Rice responded to the abusive comments by stating: "She is the love of my life, and there is no "upgrade" that exists for me."

== Career statistics ==
=== Club ===
As of match played 7 November 2026

Appearances and goals by club, season and competition
Club	Season	League			FA Cup		EFL Cup		Europe		Other		Total	
Club	Season	Division	Apps	Goals	Apps	Goals	Apps	Goals	Apps	Goals	Apps	Goals	Apps	Goals
West Ham United U23	2016–17	—			—		—		—		2 (Note: Appearance(s) in EFL Trophy)	0	2	0
West Ham United U23	2017–18	—			—		—		—		1	0	1	0
West Ham United U23	Total		—		—		—		—		3	0	3	0
West Ham United	2016–17	Premier League	1	0	0	0	0	0	0	0	—		1	0
West Ham United	2017–18	Premier League	26	0	1	0	4	0	—		—		31	0
West Ham United	2018–19	Premier League	34	2	1	0	3	0	—		—		38	2
West Ham United	2019–20	Premier League	38	1	2	0	0	0	—		—		40	1
West Ham United	2020–21	Premier League	32	2	2	0	1	0	—		—		35	2
West Ham United	2021–22	Premier League	36	1	3	1	1	0	10 (Note: Appearances in UEFA Europa League)	3	—		50	5
West Ham United	2022–23	Premier League	37	4	2	0	0	0	11 (Note: Appearances in UEFA Europa Conference League)	1	—		50	5
West Ham United	Total		204	10	11	1	9	0	21	4	—		245	15
Arsenal	2023–24	Premier League	38	7	1	0	1	0	10 (Note: Appearances in UEFA Champions League)	0	1 (Note: Appearance in FA Community Shield)	0	51	7
Arsenal	2024–25	Premier League	35	4	1	0	3	1	13	4	—		52	9
Arsenal	2025–26	Premier League	36	4	0	0	6	0	13	1	—		55	5
Arsenal	2026–27	Premier League	10	0	0	0	0	0	4	1	1	0	15	1
Arsenal	Total		119	15	2	0	10	1	40	6	2	0	173	22
Career total			323	25	13	1	19	1	61	10	5	0	421	37

=== International ===
As of match played 15 November 2026

Appearances and goals by national team and year
National team	Year	Apps	Goals
Republic of Ireland	2018	3	0
Republic of Ireland	Total	3	0
England	2019	7	0
England	2020	6	1
England	2021	14	1
England	2022	12	0
England	2023	9	1
England	2024	14	2
England	2025	10	1
England	2026	10	2
England	Total	82	8
Career total		85	8

As of matches played 18 July 2026
England score listed first, score column indicates score after each Rice goal

List of international goals scored by Declan Rice
No.	Date	Venue	Cap	Opponent	Score	Result	Competition	Ref.
1	18 November 2020	Wembley Stadium, London, England	13	Iceland	1–0	4–0	2020–21 UEFA Nations League A	
2	2 September 2021	Puskás Aréna, Budapest, Hungary	25	Hungary	4–0	4–0	2022 FIFA World Cup qualification	
3	23 March 2023	Stadio Diego Armando Maradona, Naples, Italy	40	Italy	1–0	2–1	UEFA Euro 2024 qualifying	
4	7 September 2024	Aviva Stadium, Dublin, Ireland	59	Republic of Ireland	1–0	2–0	2024–25 UEFA Nations League B	
5	13 October 2024	Helsinki Olympic Stadium, Helsinki, Finland	62	Finland	3–0	3–1	2024–25 UEFA Nations League B	
6	6 September 2025	Villa Park, Birmingham, England	70	Andorra	2–0	2–0	2026 FIFA World Cup qualification	
7	10 June 2026	Inter&Co Stadium, Orlando, United States	73	Costa Rica	1–0	3–0	Friendly	
8	18 July 2026	Hard Rock Stadium, Miami Gardens, United States	80	France	1–0	6–4	2026 FIFA World Cup	

== Honours ==
West Ham United

- UEFA Europa Conference League: 2022–23

Arsenal

- Premier League: 2025–26
- FA Community Shield: 2023, 2026
- EFL Cup runner-up: 2025–26
- UEFA Champions League runner-up: 2025–26

England

- UEFA European Championship runner-up: 2020, 2024
- FIFA World Cup third place: 2026
- UEFA Nations League third place: 2018–19

Individual

- Ballon d’Or nominee: 2024, 2025, 2026
- West Ham United Young Player of the Year: 2016–17, 2017–18, 2018–19
- Republic of Ireland U17 Player of the Year: 2016
- FAI Young International Player of the Year: 2018
- West Ham United Player of the Year: 2019–20, 2021–22, 2022–23
- London Football Premier League Young Player of the Year: 2019
- UEFA Europa League Team of the Season: 2021–22
- London Football Premier League Player of the Year: 2022, 2024
- UEFA Conference League Team of the Season: 2022–23
- UEFA Europa Conference League Player of the Season: 2022–23
- PFA Team of the Year: 2023–24 Premier League, 2024–25 Premier League, 2025–26 Premier League
- Premier League Fan Team of the Season: 2024–25, 2025–26
- UEFA Champions League Team of the Season: 2024–25, 2025–26
- Arsenal Player of the Season: 2024–25, 2025–26

== See also ==
- List of association footballers who have been capped for two senior national teams
- List of Republic of Ireland international footballers born outside the Republic of Ireland
