= 2022–23 West Ham United F.C. season =

English football team season

West Ham United
2022–23 season
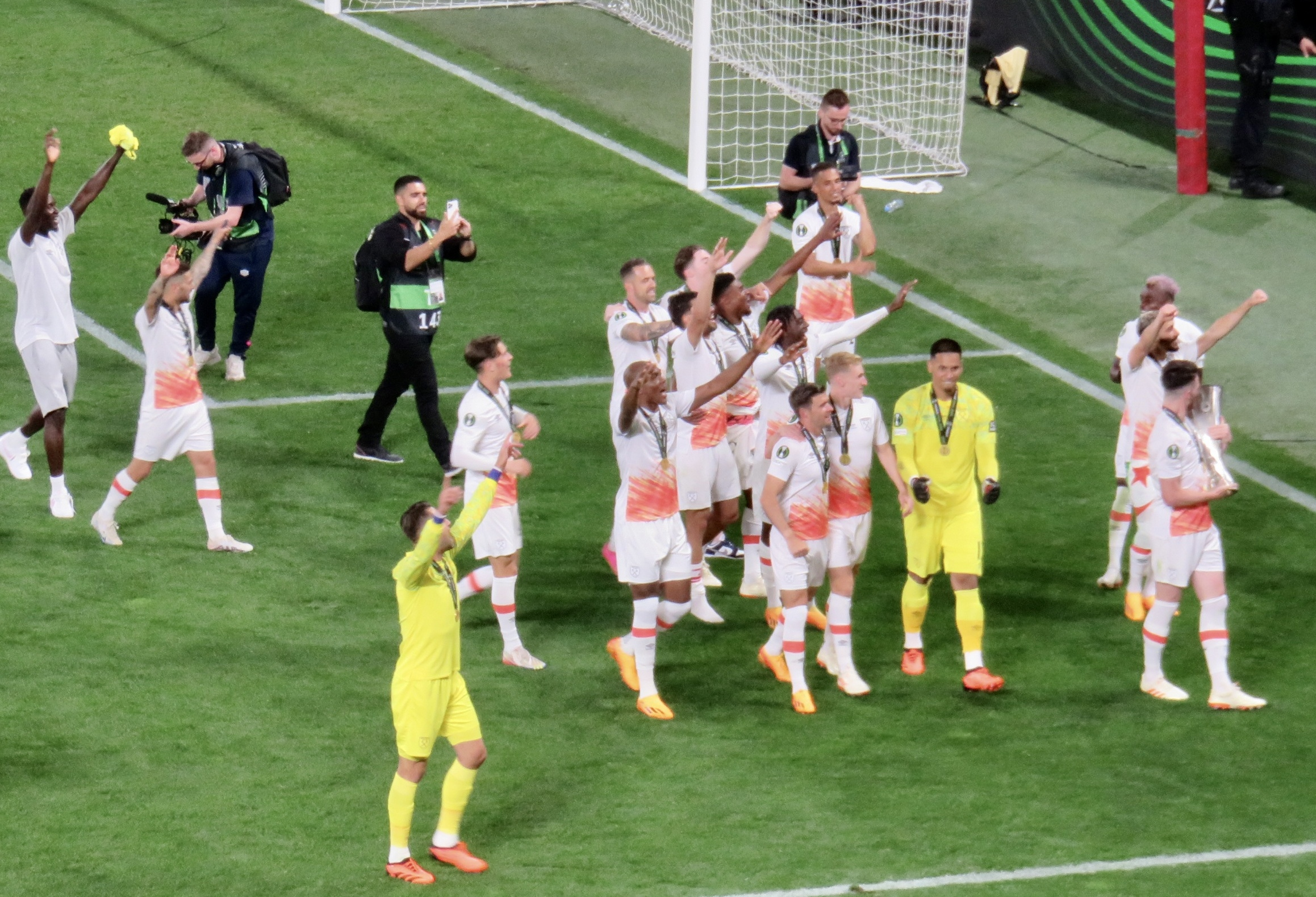
- West Ham players celebrating winning the Europa Conference League against Fiorentina on 7 June.
- Owner(s): David Sullivan (38.8%); Daniel Křetínský (27%); David Gold estate (25.1%); Albert Smith (8%); Other investors (1.1%)
- Co-chairman: David Sullivan; David Gold (died 4 January)
- Manager: David Moyes
- Stadium: London Stadium
- Premier League: 14th
- FA Cup: Fifth round
- EFL Cup: Third round
- UEFA Europa Conference League: Winners
- Top goalscorer: League: Saïd Benrahma; Jarrod Bowen (6 each); All: Michail Antonio (14)
- Highest home attendance: 62,477 v Manchester United (7 May 2023, PL)
- Lowest home attendance: 30,230 v Viborg (18 August 2022, UECL)
- Average home league attendance: 62,461
- Biggest win: 4–0 v Nottingham Forest (25 February 2023, PL); 4–0 v AEK Larnaca (16 March 2023, UECL); 4–0 v Bournemouth (23 April 2023, PL)
- Biggest defeat: 0–4 v Brighton & Hove Albion (4 March 2023, PL); 1–5 v Newcastle United (5 April 2023, PL)
Home colours	Away colours	Third colours

The 2022–23 season was the 128th season in the existence of West Ham United and the club's 11th consecutive season in the top-flight of English football. In addition to the domestic league, they also participated in this season's editions of the FA Cup, the EFL Cup, and the UEFA Europa Conference League.

The season was the first since 2003–04 without Mark Noble, who retired following the 2021–22 campaign. Vice-captain Declan Rice replaced Noble as club captain. Noble returned to West Ham as sporting director on 2 January 2023.

On 18 May 2023, West Ham became the first English team to advance to the Conference League final, where they defeated Italian club Fiorentina 2–1 on 7 June. The club won the trophy without any loss. It was West Ham's first trophy since winning the Intertoto Cup in 1999.

== Season summary ==
=== Start of season ===
==== August ====
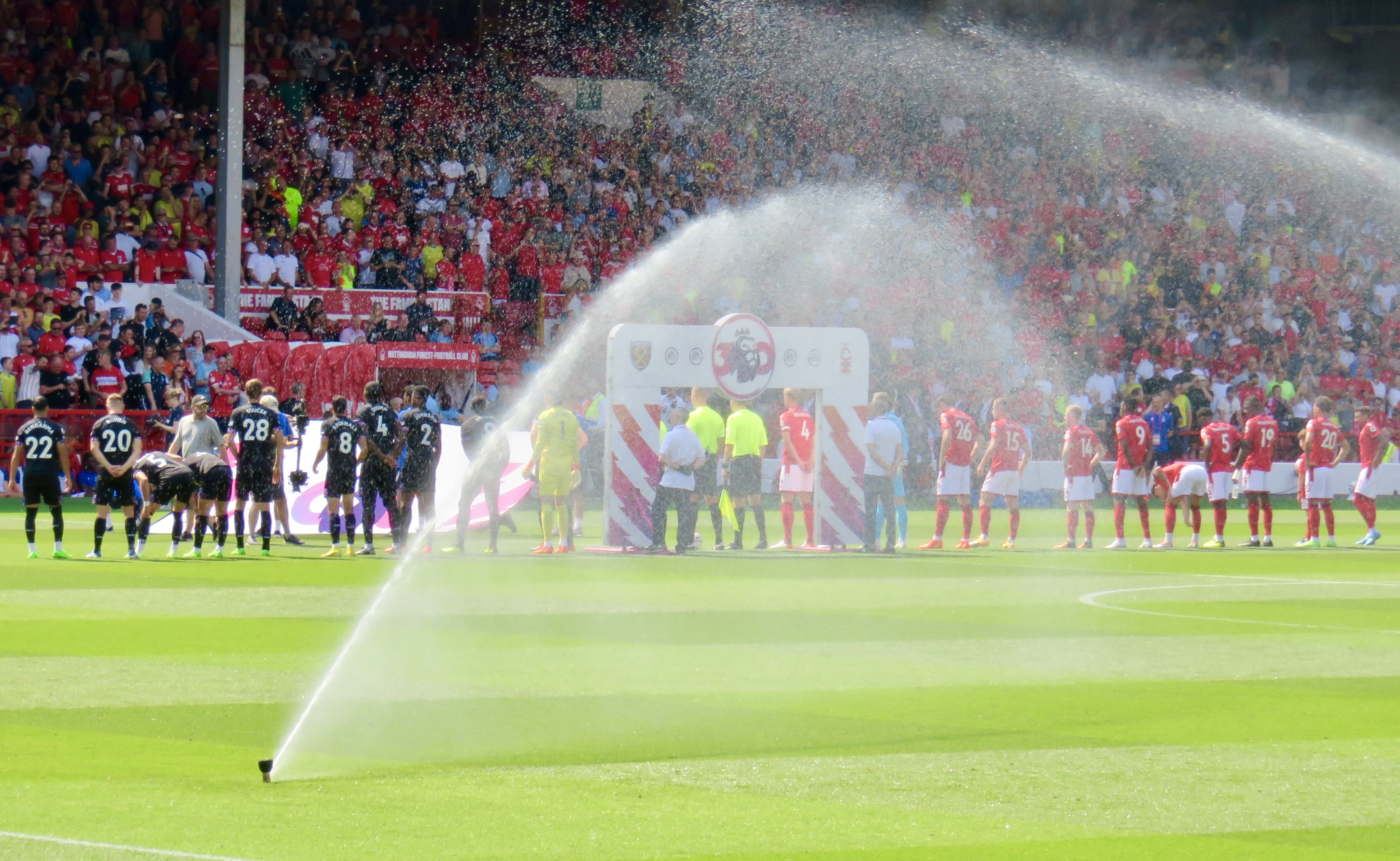
Nottingham Forest and West Ham players line up before their game at the City Ground on 14 August.

In their first league game on 7 August, West Ham lost 2–0 at home to defending champions, Manchester City, with Erling Haaland scoring his first two competitive goals on his league debut for the club. The match was watched by 62,443 supporters, a record attendance for West Ham and for football at the London Stadium.

In their second league game of the season, West Ham lost 1–0 at the City Ground to newly promoted Nottingham Forest. The game was Forest's first game in the Premier League for 23 years. Declan Rice had a penalty saved by Dean Henderson while Saïd Benrahma twice hit the woodwork as West Ham again failed to score.

On 18 August, West Ham began their European campaign by playing Danish team Viborg in the first leg of the 2022–23 UEFA Europa Conference League play-off round. Manager David Moyes, captain Declan Rice and defender Aaron Cresswell were all suspended following disciplinary incidents against Eintracht Frankfurt in the previous season's Europa League semi-final. Two of Viborg's players, Nigerian winger Ibrahim Said and Gambian forward Alassana Jatta were unavailable as the club was unable to gain entry visas to the UK following new rules applicable to non-EU nationals following Brexit.

The Hammers won their opening Conference League match 3–1. In the game, Gianluca Scamacca scored his first goal for the club, assisted by new signing Maxwel Cornet. Jarrod Bowen doubled their lead before Viborg's Jakob Bonde pulled one back for the Danish club. Substitute Michail Antonio scored a 78th-minute goal to give the Hammers a two goal lead going into the reverse fixture in Denmark.

West Ham returned to the Premier League on 21 August to play Brighton & Hove Albion, with a new record crowd of 62,449. New signing Thilo Kehrer made his league debut in the match, fouling Danny Welbeck in the box and giving away a penalty, which Alexis Mac Allister converted. Brighton scored a second through Leandro Trossard and the game finished 2–0, marking West Ham's third consecutive league defeat and leaving them bottom of the table. This was the first time since 1971 that West Ham had lost their first three games of the season without scoring in the top tier.

West Ham then travelled to Denmark for the second leg of their Conference League play-off against Viborg on 25 August. Gianluca Scamacca opened the scoring in the first half, whilst Saïd Benrahma and Tomáš Souček added to the scoreline in the second. The game finished 3–0, with an aggregate scoreline of 6–1, as West Ham qualified comfortably for the group stage.

On 28 August, the Hammers travelled to Birmingham to play Aston Villa in the Premier League. Pablo Fornals scored West Ham's first league goal of the season in the 74th minute, his shot deflecting off of Ezri Konsa and over goalkeeper Emiliano Martínez, securing West Ham's first league win of the season as the game finished 1–0. The game was West Ham's 1000th in the Premier League, the ninth club to reach this total.

On 31 August, West Ham played their first London derby of the season, against Tottenham Hotspur. The game finished 1–1 due to an own goal from Thilo Kehrer and a second-half equaliser from Tomáš Souček. West Ham's record signing, Lucas Paquetá made his debut in the match. The game marked the 200th appearances in all competitions by Declan Rice and in the Premier League by Michail Antonio.

==== September ====
On 3 September, West Ham played their second London derby, this time away to Chelsea. Michail Antonio scored in the 62nd minute before the Hammers were pegged back by a Ben Chilwell equaliser just fourteen minutes later. Kai Havertz scored the winning goal in the 88th minute, however, a last-minute West Ham equaliser from Maxwel Cornet was controversially disallowed by referee Andy Madley after a VAR check deemed that Chelsea goalkeeper Édouard Mendy had been fouled by Jarrod Bowen. Manager David Moyes called the decision "scandalous".

West Ham began their UEFA Europa Conference League group stage campaign on 8 September against FCSB at London Stadium. The Hammers won the game 3–1, after suffering a first-half setback from FCSB's Andrei Cordea, goals from Jarrod Bowen, Emerson and Michail Antonio sealed the win to put West Ham top of Group B after the first round of matches. The game contained multiple tributes to long-reigning British queen Elizabeth II, whose death had been announced earlier that day. Players from both teams wore black armbands and a minute's silence was held before kick-off, fans also sung a rendition of the United Kingdom's national anthem "God Save the Queen" in tribute to the late monarch.

All Premier League games for matchweek seven were postponed as part of the national period of mourning after the Queen's death; however, all European games went ahead as usual. West Ham then played Silkeborg on 15 September, conceding in the first five minutes to Kasper Kusk before Manuel Lanzini equalised from a penalty, Gianluca Scamacca put the Hammers in front and Craig Dawson gave West Ham a two-goal advantage. Silkeborg pulled one back through Søren Tengstedt but the Hammers held on for the final fifteen minutes to secure their second consecutive group stage victory.

When the Premier League returned, West Ham played Everton at Goodison Park on 18 September. The Hammers lost 1–0 due to a Neal Maupay strike shortly after half-time, leaving them in the relegation zone going into the international break. This was also their joint-worst start to a Premier League season.

==== October ====
After the international break, the Hammers played Wolverhampton Wanderers on 1 October. Gianluca Scamacca opened the scoring, with his first Premier League goal, in the first half before Jarrod Bowen doubled their lead in the second. The game finished 2–0 as the Hammers recorded their first league home win of the season. On 6 October, West Ham travelled to Belgium to face Anderlecht. The game finished 1–0 to West Ham, the only goal being scored by Gianluca Scamacca in the 79th minute.

On 9 October, the Hammers played Fulham in the Premier League. After scoring for Fulham in the 5th minute, Andreas Pereira gave away a penalty by fouling Craig Dawson in the box, Jarrod Bowen converted the penalty to equalise by sending Bernd Leno the wrong way. Lucas Paquetá assisted Gianluca Scamacca's second-half goal before Michail Antonio scored in added time to secure a 3–1 win for the Hammers. The Hammers officially sealed their place in the Conference League knockout stages on 13 October with a 2–1 win over Anderlecht, Saïd Benrahma and Jarrod Bowen scored in the first half before Sebastiano Esposito pulled one back for the Belgians via a penalty in the 89th minute.

On 16 October, West Ham drew 1–1 away to Southampton. Romain Perraud scored for the home team before Declan Rice equalised, his first league goal since October 2021. West Ham were later charged by the Football Association with failing to control their players after they surrounded referee Peter Bankes angered by his decision to allow Perruad's goal believing that Bankes had blocked Jarrod Bowen's path as he attempted to beat Perraud. On 19 October, West Ham lost 1–0 to Liverpool. Liverpool's Darwin Núñez scored his first goal at Anfield, in the 22nd minute, whilst Jarrod Bowen had his penalty saved by Alisson just before half-time.

On 24 October, West Ham returned to the London Stadium to play Bournemouth in the Premier League. They won the game 2–0 with goals from Kurt Zouma and Saïd Benrahma, their first Premier League goals of the season. Both goals were reviewed by VAR relating to possible handball incidents. The opening goal by Kurt Zouma contained a handball by Thilo Kehrer but stood as the handball had not occurred in the immediate build-up to the goal. The second goal, a penalty, was awarded after VAR had looked at a possible handball by Bournemouth's Jordan Zemura and decided that he had handled the ball in the penalty area.

The Hammers secured their place in the Conference League round of sixteen with a 1–0 win over Silkeborg on 27 October. The only goal of the game came from a Manuel Lanzini penalty in the first half, which was given after Silkeborg goalkeeper Nicolai Larsen fouled Michail Antonio in the box. The game was summer signing Nayef Aguerd's competitive debut, as he had just recovered from an ankle injury he sustained in a pre-season friendly against Rangers in July.

On 30 October, West Ham played Manchester United at Old Trafford. The game ended 1–0 to Manchester United, with a 38th minute goal from Marcus Rashford, his 100th for the club, sealing the win for the Red Devils. Manchester United goalkeeper David de Gea made key saves against Michail Antonio, Kurt Zouma and Declan Rice and was praised by both his own manager Erik ten Hag and West Ham manager David Moyes.

=== Mid-season ===
==== November ====
On 3 November, West Ham played FCSB in the final Conference League group stage match. The game ended in a 3–0 win for the Hammers, with Pablo Fornals scoring a brace. Debutant Divin Mubama celebrated what he believed to be his first senior goal, however, it was later deemed a Joyskim Dawa own goal. Several Academy players made their senior competitive debuts in the match, including Mubama, Oliver Scarles, Kamarai Simon-Swyer and Kaelan Casey.

On 6 November, the Hammers played Crystal Palace in the Premier League. They lost the game 2–1, with Saïd Benrahma putting the Hammers ahead early before Wilfried Zaha equalised for the Eagles late in the first half, Michael Olise then scored an added-time winner for Palace. Manager David Moyes said in a post-match interview that West Ham "didn't deserve an awful lot from the game".

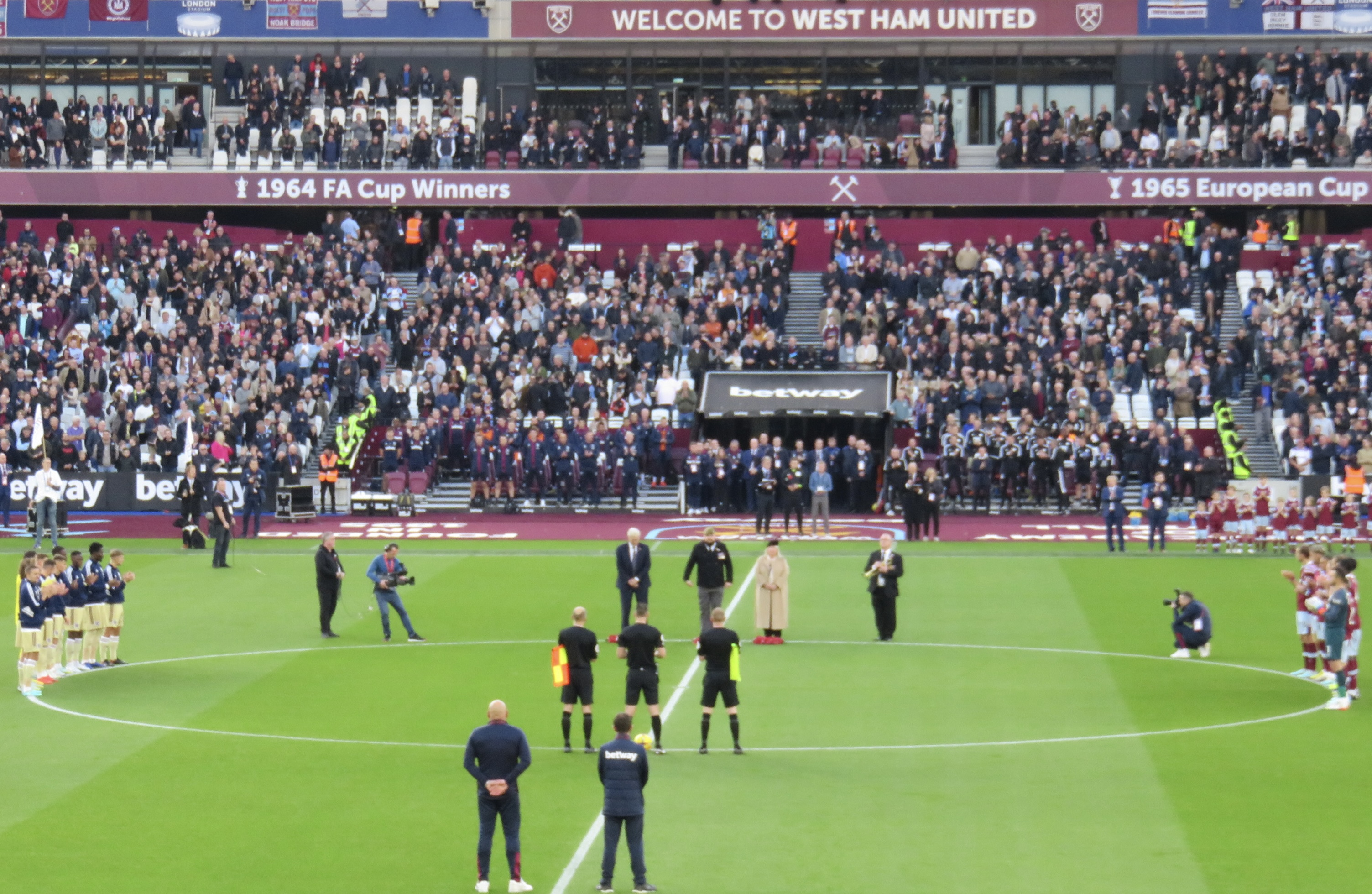
Remembrance Sunday commemorated at the London Stadium before the game against Leicester City on 12 November.

On 9 November, West Ham were knocked out of the League Cup in their first match against Blackburn Rovers. Blackburn opened the scoring in the 6th minute through Jack Vale before Pablo Fornals equalised for West Ham in the 38th minute. In the second half, Michail Antonio put West Ham ahead before Ben Brereton Díaz made the match level again. After 90 minutes, the game ended in a 2–2 draw and the match went to a penalty shoot-out. In the shoot-out, West Ham and Blackburn both scored their first nine penalties and Jake Garrett then converted Blackburn's tenth, however, West Ham's Angelo Ogbonna hit the bar and Blackburn progressed to the fourth round.

On 12 November, in their last match before the winter break, West Ham lost 2–0 to Leicester City. The Hammers conceded early in the first half as James Maddison put Leicester ahead eight minutes in and Youri Tielemans' penalty was saved by Łukasz Fabiański just before the end of the half. Despite many attempts from Lucas Paquetá, Declan Rice, Saïd Benrahma and Gianluca Scamacca, the game remained 1–0 until Harvey Barnes made it two for Leicester late on. Leicester goalkeeper Danny Ward was voted man of the match by users on the Premier League website for his performance.

Following the defeat to Leicester, their third defeat in a week leaving the club in 16th position in the league, one point above the relegation zone, a senior spokesman for the club said that Moyes "deserved the right to turn the situation around". There was then a mid-season winter break for the 2022 FIFA World Cup. Five West Ham players were called up for the World Cup by their respective national teams: Declan Rice for England, Alphonse Areola for France, Thilo Kehrer for Germany, Nayef Aguerd for Morocco and Lucas Paquetá for Brazil. Outside of the World Cup, Saïd Benrahma (for Algeria) and Vladimír Coufal and Tomáš Souček (both for the Czech Republic) were called up for friendly matches.

==== December ====
In their first match after the winter break, West Ham played Arsenal at the Emirates Stadium on 26 December. The Hammers were awarded a penalty in the 27th minute, which Saïd Benrahma converted, after William Saliba fouled Jarrod Bowen in the box. Referee Michael Oliver originally awarded Arsenal a penalty for an Aaron Cresswell handball in the last moments of the first half, however, a VAR check determined that the ball had actually struck Cresswell's head and not his hand. The Gunners fought back in the second half and won the match 3–1, with goals from Bukayo Saka, Gabriel Martinelli and Eddie Nketiah sealing the comeback victory.

On 30 December, in their last match of 2022, West Ham lost 2–0 to Brentford at London Stadium. The Hammers started the game well, with multiple attempts being saved by David Raya. However, in the 18th minute, Brentford scored as Christian Nørgaard's shot was saved by Łukasz Fabiański and rebounded to Ivan Toney. Brentford doubled their lead before half-time through Josh Dasilva, who managed to outpace Aaron Cresswell and slide the ball past Fabiański. The game was West Ham's fifth consecutive league defeat, equalling a similar run from March and April 2017 under Slaven Bilić. A minute of applause was held before the match to honour Brazilian footballer Pelé, who had died the day before, players from both teams also wore black armbands in tribute.

==== January ====
In their first match of 2023, West Ham played Leeds United at Elland Road on 4 January. Leeds opened the scoring midway through the first half through Wilfried Gnonto before Lucas Paquetá converted a penalty, which had been awarded after Pascal Struijk fouled Jarrod Bowen, in the final moments of the first half. Gianluca Scamacca put the Hammers ahead early in the second half before Rodrigo scored for Leeds in the 70th minute to level the match, which ended in a 2–2 draw. The match also included tributes to West Ham co-owner and joint-chairman David Gold, who had died earlier that day. The tributes included a bouquet of flowers being left at his allocated seat in the director's box, a round of applause from fans of both teams and black armbands being worn by all players on the pitch.

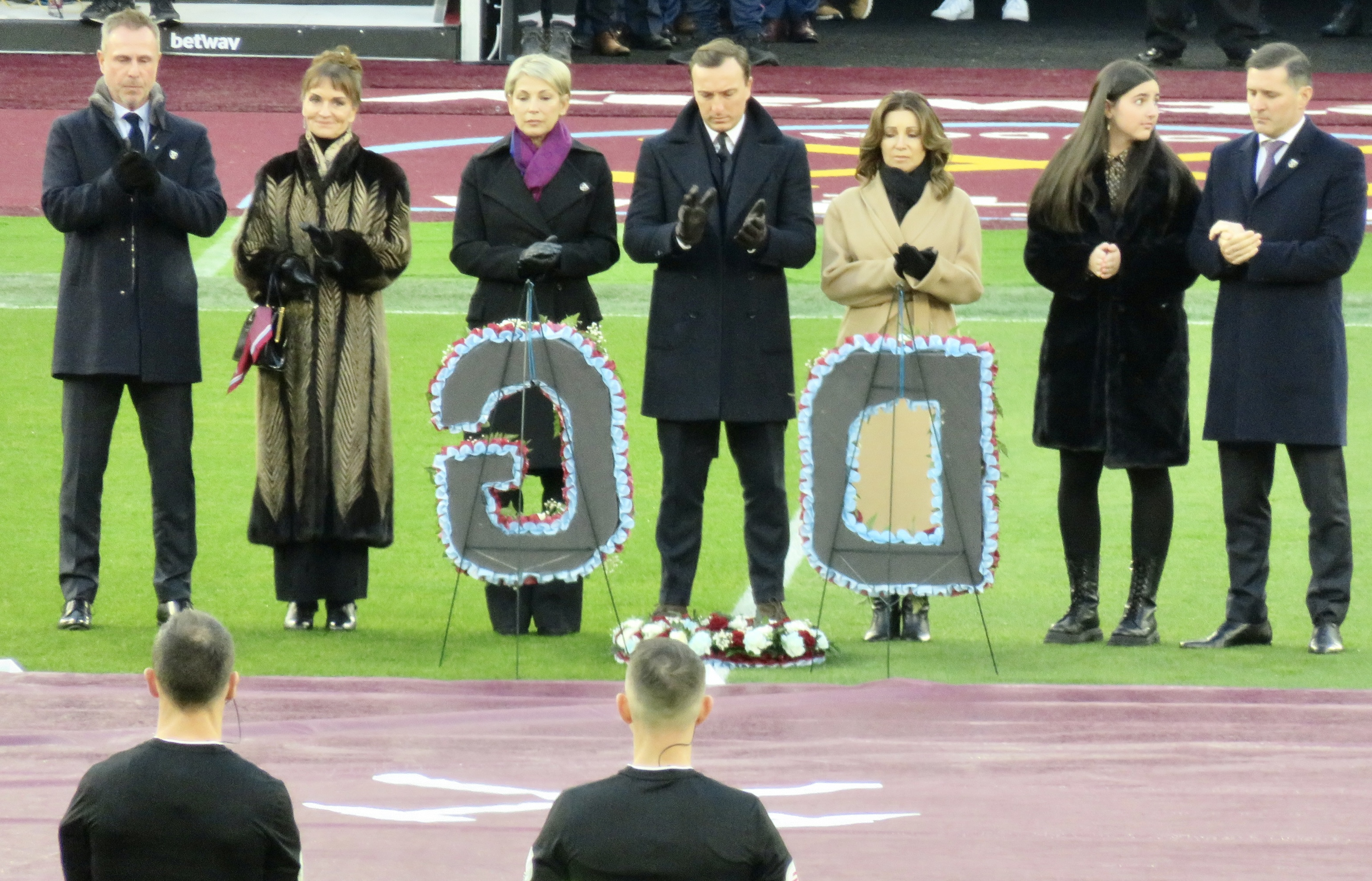
The family of David Gold with Mark Noble commemorate his life at the London Stadium before West Ham's game against Everton.

West Ham then played Brentford at the Gtech Community Stadium in the third round of the FA Cup on 7 January. The Hammers won the match 1–0 after a late Saïd Benrahma goal, ending their six-game winless run and progressing to the fourth round, where they were drawn away to Derby County. On 14 January, West Ham played Wolverhampton Wanderers at the Molineux Stadium in the Premier League. Wolves won the match 1–0, with a goal from Daniel Podence at the start of the second half sealing the Hammers 12th loss of the Premier League season.

On 21 January, West Ham played Everton at London Stadium in the Premier League. The Hammers won the match 2–0, with Jarrod Bowen scoring both goals in the first half, ending their seven-game winless run and taking the club out of the relegation zone. In a post-match interview, Bowen said it was "really special" to have scored two goals the day after announcing he was having twins with his partner Dani Dyer. The match was also the debut of new signing Danny Ings, who came on as a substitute for Michail Antonio in the second half.

West Ham played Derby County in the fourth round of the FA Cup at Pride Park on 30 January. The Hammers won the match 2–0, with goals from Jarrod Bowen and Michail Antonio sealing the win to send West Ham through to the fifth round, where they were drawn away to Manchester United.

==== February ====
The Hammers then faced Newcastle United at St James' Park on 4 February. The match ended in a 1–1 draw, with Newcastle taking the lead within the first three minutes through Callum Wilson before Lucas Paquetá equalised for West Ham in the 32nd minute. West Ham then played Chelsea at London Stadium on 11 February. Chelsea took the lead in the 16th minute through João Félix before Emerson Palmieri scored against his former club to equalise for the Hammers in the 28th minute, both goals were the scorers' first Premier League goals. Tomáš Souček appeared to have won the match for the Hammers late on but was deemed offside. The game was West Ham's second consecutive draw in the league.

West Ham then played Tottenham Hotspur at Tottenham Hotspur Stadium on 19 February. Tottenham won the match 2–0 with two second half goals from Emerson Royal and Son Heung-min after a goalless first half. The match left the Hammers in the relegation zone. When asked about the match and West Ham's overall situation in post-match interviews, manager David Moyes expressed disappointment at the defensive errors which led up to Emerson Royal's opener, whilst midfielder Flynn Downes said, "we know what we are in for now - it's a relegation battle". On 25 February, West Ham played Nottingham Forest in the Premier League at the London Stadium. After a goalless first-half, the Hammers won the game 4–0 with two goals from Danny Ings, his first for the club, and a goal each from Declan Rice and Michail Antonio.

=== End of season ===
==== March ====
On 1 March, West Ham played Manchester United, who had been crowned League Cup champions three days prior, at Old Trafford in the fifth round of the FA Cup. After a goalless first half, the Hammers went ahead in the 54th minute through Saïd Benrahma before Nayef Aguerd scored an own goal to level the game. Alejandro Garnacho scored in the 90th minute to put the Red Devils ahead before Fred extended their lead to 3–1 in the fifth minute of added time, knocking West Ham out of the FA Cup. West Ham then returned to the league to play Brighton & Hove Albion at the American Express Community Stadium on 4 March. The Hammers lost the match 4–0, with Brighton's goals coming via an 18th-minute Alexis Mac Allister penalty and three second-half goals from Joël Veltman, Kaoru Mitoma and Danny Welbeck. During the second half, manager David Moyes was the target of chants such as "you don't know what you're doing" and "sacked in the morning" whilst captain Declan Rice described the match as "demoralising" and apologised to supporters in a post-match interview. Moyes described the result as "one of the worst results of his tenure" as West Ham manager.

West Ham then played Cypriot team AEK Larnaca in the UEFA Europa Conference League round of 16 at the AEK Arena in Larnaca on 9 March. The Hammers won the match 2–0, with Michail Antonio scoring both goals to give West Ham a 2–goal advantage going into the reverse fixture in London. The Hammers then returned to the Premier League to play Aston Villa at the London Stadium on 12 March. The match ended in a 1–1 draw after Ollie Watkins put Villa ahead 17 minutes in and Saïd Benrahma scored a penalty, which had been awarded after Leon Bailey fouled Lucas Paquetá inside the penalty area, in the 26th minute. On 16 March, West Ham played the return leg in the Europa Conference League, at the London Stadium against AEK Larnaca. They won 4–0 with a goal from Gianluca Scamacca, two from Jarrod Bowen and a debut professional goal from Divin Mubama. Towards the end of the first half, Larnaca's Gus Ledes was sent off for a challenge on Pablo Fornals after a VAR check upgraded referee Georgi Kabakov's yellow card to a red card.

The Hammers did not play during the final week of the Premier League before the March international break as their away match against Manchester City was postponed due to the Cityzens progressing into the quarter-finals of the FA Cup. During the March international break, seven West Ham players were called up to participate in UEFA Euro 2024 qualifying: Declan Rice for England, Alphonse Areola for France, Vladimír Coufal and Tomáš Souček for the Czech Republic, Gianluca Scamacca and Emerson Palmieri for Italy and Thilo Kehrer for Germany. Two players were also called up for international friendlies: Lucas Paquetá for Brazil and Nayef Aguerd for Morocco, the two teams played a friendly against each other which Morocco won 2–1 in Tangier.

==== April ====
On 2 April, West Ham beat fellow relegation strugglers Southampton 1–0 in a Premier League game thanks to a goal from Nayef Aguerd, his first for the club. On 5 April, West Ham suffered their biggest home defeat since August 2019, losing 5–1 at home to Newcastle United. In a game strewn with defensive errors, Newcastle scored through two goals from Callum Wilson, two from Joelinton and one from Alexander Isak. West Ham's goal was scored by Kurt Zouma. At the end of the game, manager David Moyes was loudly booed as he walked down the player's tunnel. On 8 April, West Ham recorded only their second away win of the season by beating Fulham by 1–0 at Craven Cottage. The single goal was an own goal scored by Harrison Reed as he turned Jarrod Bowen's cross into his own net. West Ham again played away to Belgian club Gent in the Europa Conference League on 13 April. The game, a quarter-final first-leg match, finished 1–1. West Ham scored just before half-time with a tap-in by Danny Ings from a cross by Jarrod Bowen. Gent equalised in the 56th with a goal from Hugo Cuypers.

On 16 April, West Ham played league leaders Arsenal at the London Stadium. The Gunners took the lead early in the first half through Gabriel Jesus in the 7th minute before Martin Ødegaard doubled their lead in the 10th minute. West Ham were awarded a penalty by referee David Coote towards the end of the first half after Lucas Paquetá was fouled by Gabriel Magalhães inside the box, Saïd Benrahma converted the penalty. Arsenal were then awarded a penalty in the second half for a Michail Antonio handball, though Bukayo Saka failed to convert it to extend Arsenal's lead. Jarrod Bowen then scored in the 54th minute to bring the Hammers level. The match finished 2–2.

West Ham played the second leg of the quarter-finals of the Europa Conference League against Gent at the London Stadium on 20 April winning 4–1, resulting in an aggregate score of 5–2 and earning a place in the semi-finals against AZ Alkmaar. Gent took the lead in the 26th minute through Hugo Cuypers. West Ham equalised in the 37th minute through Michail Antonio. They added three goals in the second half through a Lucas Paquetá penalty awarded after a handball by Joseph Okumu, a third by Declan Rice described as "brilliant" and a second for Michail Antonio in the 63rd minute.

On 23 April, West Ham returned to playing in the Premier League. They won 4–0 against Bournemouth at the Vitality Stadium. Michail Antonio opened the scoring, a second was added by Lucas Paquetá with Declan Rice adding a third just before half-time. Pablo Fornals scored a fourth in the 72nd minute with a goal from a scorpion kick. West Ham played Liverpool on 26 April in the Premier League at the London Stadium. Despite taking the lead in the 12th minute with a goal by Lucas Paquetá, Liverpool equalised in the 18th minute through Cody Gakpo and scored a second via a header from Joel Matip in the 67th minute. No further goals were scored as Liverpool ran-out 2–1 winners.

On 29 April, West Ham played Crystal Palace at Selhurst Park. The Hammers opened the scoring through Tomáš Souček in the 9th minute before the Eagles equalised through Jordan Ayew just six minutes later. Crystal Palace then went ahead through Wilfried Zaha in the 20th minute before Jeffrey Schlupp added another just ten minutes later. West Ham then pulled one back in the 35th minute through Michail Antonio. In the second half, the Eagles were awarded a penalty by referee Craig Pawson after Nayef Aguerd fouled Eberechi Eze in the box, Eze then converted the penalty to extend Palace's lead. Aguerd then pulled another goal back for West Ham in the 72nd minute and the match ended 4–3 to the Eagles.

==== May ====
On 3 May, West Ham played Manchester City at the City of Manchester Stadium. The game was goalless at half time but City scored three goals in the second half through Nathan Aké, Erling Haaland and Phil Foden. Haaland’s goal was his 35th league goal of the season breaking a Premier League record of 34 which had been held by Andy Cole and Alan Shearer. Before the game the West Ham squad was hit by a bout of illness. Having travelled to Manchester, and all due to play, Declan Rice, Tomáš Souček and Nayef Aguerd were all withdrawn from the squad after feeling unwell. West Ham played Manchester United in the Premier League at the London Stadium on 7 May. They won the game 1-0, the only goal came in the first half after goalkeeper, David de Gea let a weak shot from distance by Saïd Benrahma into his net.

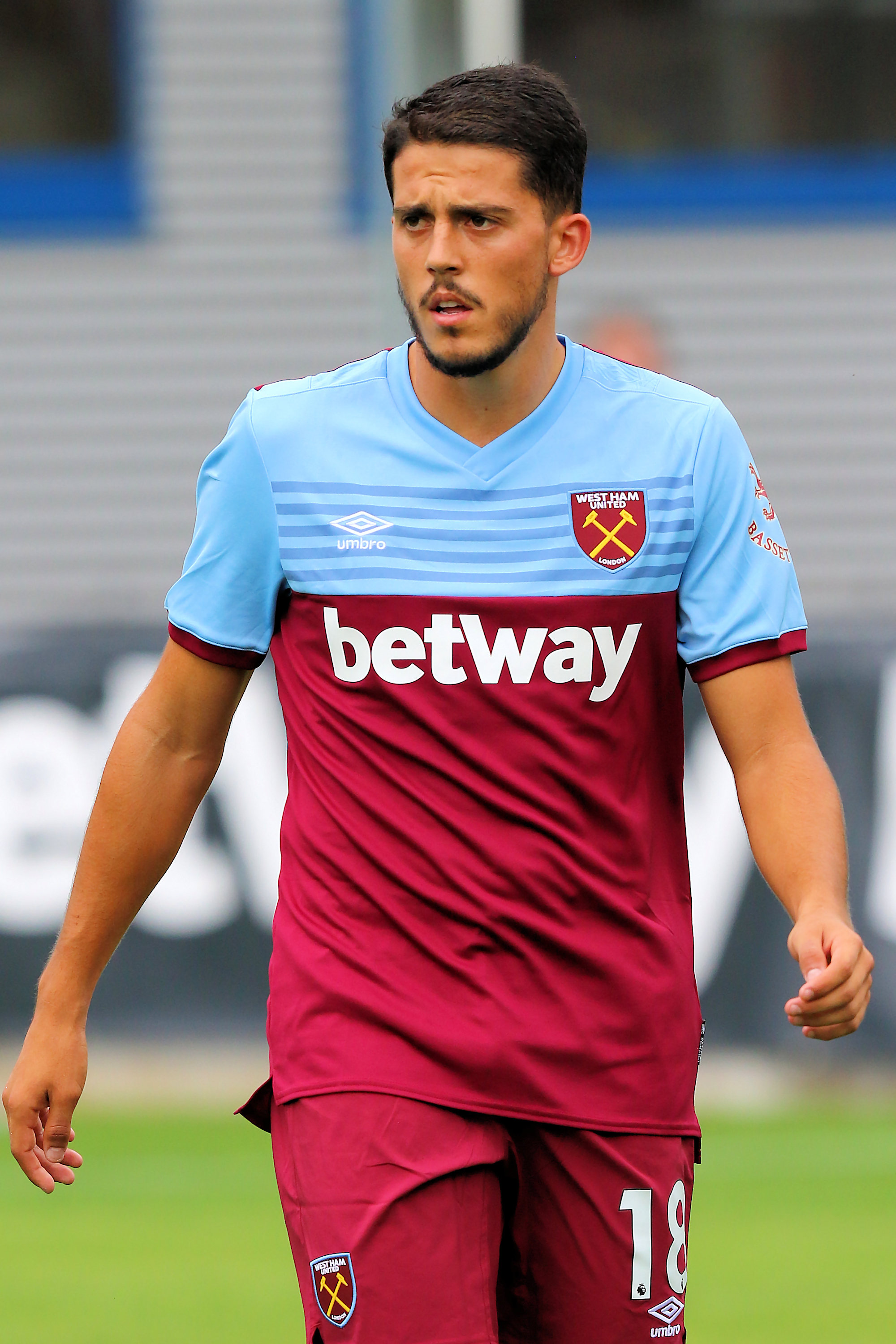
Pablo Fornals, scorer of West Ham's winning goal at AZ Alkmaar.

On 11 May, West Ham played Dutch club AZ Alkmaar in the first leg of the UEFA Europa Conference League semi-finals at home in London. The Hammers won the match 2–1. AZ scored through Tijjani Reijnders shortly before the end of the first half before referee Halil Umut Meler awarded West Ham a penalty twenty minutes into the second half, which Saïd Benrahma then converted, after Jarrod Bowen collided with goalkeeper Mathew Ryan in the box; Michail Antonio then added the winning goal just nine minutes later. West Ham played Brentford in the Premier League on 14 May at the Gtech Community Stadium. With eyes on the upcoming Europa Conference League semi-finals second leg on 18 May, David Moyes made seven changes from the team which had beaten Manchester United the previous week. Brentford won 2–0 scoring both goals in the first half, through Bryan Mbeumo and Yoane Wissa. On 18 May, West Ham played the second leg of their Conference League semi-final against AZ Alkmaar. The Hammers won 1–0 in Alkmaar, with an aggregate score of 3–1. Substitute Pablo Fornals scored the only goal, in added time, to send West Ham to their first European final since the European Cup Winners' Cup final in May 1976.

On 21 May, West Ham played Leeds United in the Premier League in their last home game of the season. Leeds were managed by former West Ham manager, Sam Allardyce. Leeds scored first, in the 17th minute with a volley from Rodrigo. Declan Rice equalised in the 32nd minute. West Ham added two more in the second-half through Jarrod Bowen and Manuel Lanzini as the score finished 3–1.

On the last day of the Premier League season, on 28 May, West Ham played relegation-threatened Leicester City at the King Power Stadium. Leicester scored in the 34th minute through Harvey Barnes and added a second in the 62nd minute with a header from Wout Faes. Pablo Fornals scored for West Ham in the 79th minute to make the score 2–1. No further goals were scored, and despite winning Leicester were relegated to the Championship. West Ham finished the league season in 14th place with 40 points.

==== June ====
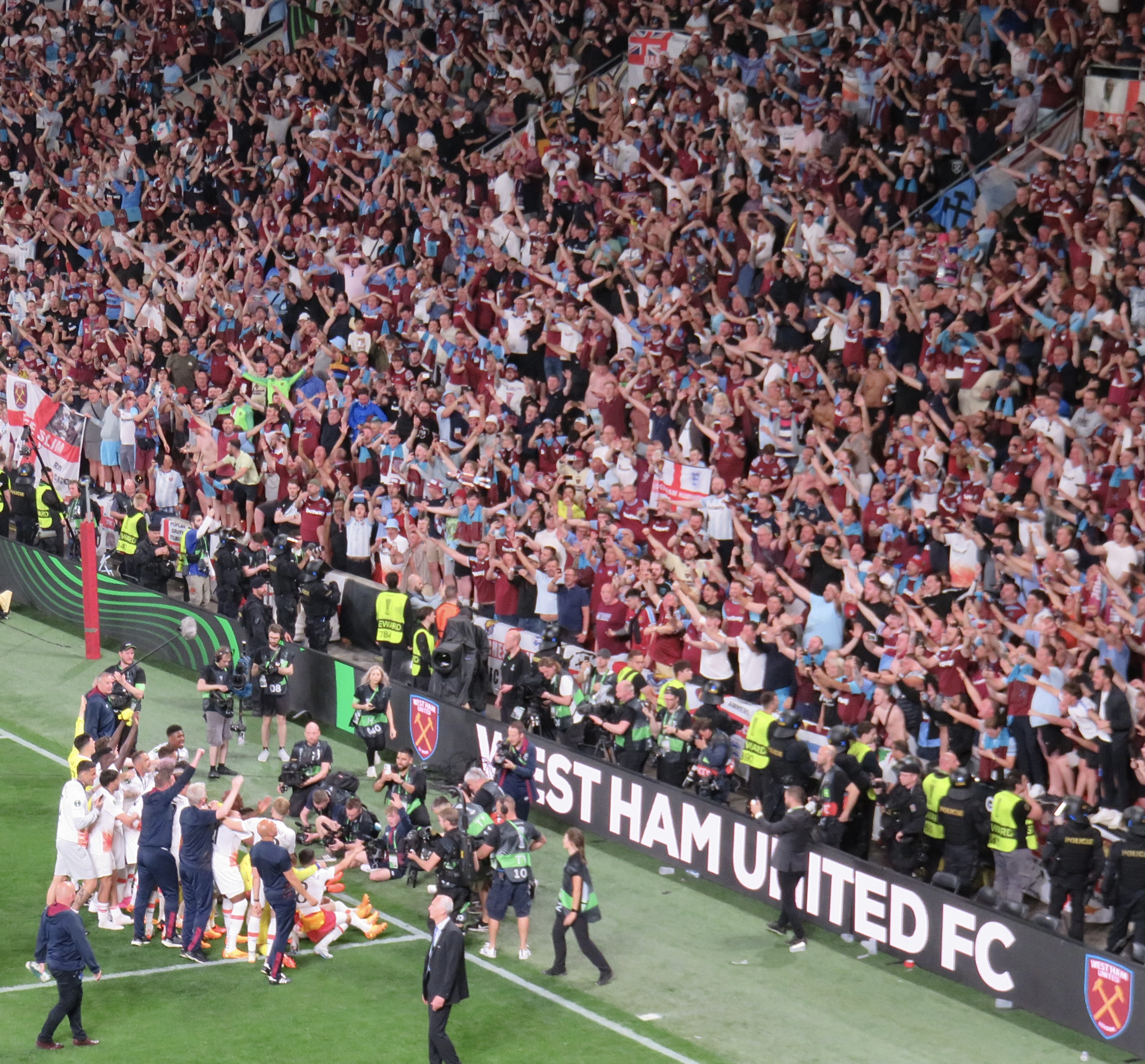
West Ham players, staff and supporters celebrate their Europa Conference League final win.

On 7 June, West Ham won the UEFA Europa Conference League final against Fiorentina at the Fortuna Arena in Prague. The game remained goalless until referee Carlos del Cerro Grande awarded the Hammers a penalty in the second half after the ball hit the hand of Fiorentina captain Cristiano Biraghi after a long throw into the box. Saïd Benrahma converted the penalty to put the Hammers ahead in the 62nd minute until just five minutes later when Giacomo Bonaventura shot the ball past Alphonse Areola and into the bottom left corner to level the game for Fiorentina. The match remained drawn until the 90th minute when Lucas Paquetá intercepted a pass in midfield and passed the ball through to Jarrod Bowen, who scored past Fiorentina goalkeeper Pietro Terracciano to reclaim West Ham's lead and secure the Conference League trophy. It was West Ham's first trophy since they won the FA Cup in 1980, when they beat Arsenal in the final, and their first European final since the European Cup Winners' Cup in 1976, when they lost to Anderlecht in the final. Jarrod Bowen was named Player of the Match for the final, whilst captain Declan Rice was declared Conference League Player of the Season by UEFA's Technical Observer panel.

=== Season squad ===
Squad No.	Name	Nationality	Position(s)	Date of birth (age)
Goalkeepers
1	Łukasz Fabiański	(Poland)	GK	18 April 1985 (aged 38)
13	Alphonse Areola	(France)	GK	27 February 1993 (aged 30)
49	Joseph Anang	(Ghana)	GK	8 June 2000 (aged 22)
Defenders
2	Ben Johnson	(England)	DF	24 January 2000 (aged 23)
3	Aaron Cresswell	(England)	DF	15 December 1989 (aged 33)
4	Kurt Zouma	(France)	DF	27 October 1994 (aged 28)
5	Vladimír Coufal	(Czech Republic)	DF	22 August 1992 (aged 30)
21	Angelo Ogbonna	(Italy)	DF	23 May 1988 (aged 35)
24	Thilo Kehrer	(Germany)	DF	21 September 1996 (aged 26)
27	Nayef Aguerd	(Morocco)	DF	30 March 1996 (aged 27)
33	Emerson Palmieri	(Italy)	DF	3 August 1994 (aged 28)
Midfielders
8	Pablo Fornals	(Spain)	MF	22 February 1996 (aged 27)
10	Manuel Lanzini	(Argentina)	MF	15 February 1993 (aged 30)
11	Lucas Paquetá	(Brazil)	MF	27 August 1997 (aged 25)
12	Flynn Downes	(England)	MF	20 January 1999 (aged 24)
14	Maxwel Cornet	(Ivory Coast)	MF	27 September 1996 (aged 26)
28	Tomáš Souček	(Czech Republic)	MF	27 February 1995 (aged 28)
41	Declan Rice (C)	(England)	MF	14 January 1999 (aged 24)
Forwards
7	Gianluca Scamacca	(Italy)	FW	1 January 1999 (aged 24)
9	Michail Antonio	(Jamaica)	FW	28 March 1990 (aged 33)
18	Danny Ings	(England)	FW	23 July 1992 (aged 30)
20	Jarrod Bowen	(England)	FW	20 December 1996 (aged 26)
22	Saïd Benrahma	(Algeria)	FW	10 August 1995 (aged 27)

Last updated: 26 January 2023.
Source: West Ham United F.C.

== Transfers ==
=== In ===
Date	Pos.	Player	Transferred from	Fee	Ref.
20 June 2022	CB	(Morocco) Nayef Aguerd	(France) Rennes	Undisclosed	
27 June 2022	GK	(France) Alphonse Areola	(France) Paris Saint-Germain	Undisclosed	
1 July 2022	CM	(Northern Ireland) Patrick Kelly	(Northern Ireland) Coleraine	Undisclosed	
7 July 2022	CM	(England) Flynn Downes	(Wales) Swansea City	Undisclosed	
26 July 2022	ST	(Italy) Gianluca Scamacca	(Italy) Sassuolo	Undisclosed	
5 August 2022	LW	(Ivory Coast) Maxwel Cornet	(England) Burnley	Undisclosed	
17 August 2022	CB	(Germany) Thilo Kehrer	(France) Paris Saint-Germain	Undisclosed	
23 August 2022	LB	(Italy) Emerson Palmieri	(England) Chelsea	Undisclosed	
25 August 2022	CB	(Northern Ireland) Josh Briggs	(Northern Ireland) Linfield	Undisclosed	
29 August 2022	AM	(Brazil) Lucas Paquetá	(France) Lyon	Undisclosed	
1 January 2023	CB	(Brazil) Luizão	(Brazil) São Paulo	Undisclosed	
20 January 2023	ST	(England) Danny Ings	(England) Aston Villa	Undisclosed	

=== Out ===
Date	Pos.	Player	Transferred to	Fee	Ref.
30 June 2022	CM	(England) Ossama Ashley	(England) Colchester United	Released	
30 June 2022	LW	(England) Amadou Diallo	(England) Newcastle United	Released	
30 June 2022	LB	(England) Isaac Evans	(Spain) Almuñécar City	Released	
30 June 2022	LB	(England) Jayden Fevrier	(England) Colchester United	Released	
30 June 2022	RB	(England) Ryan Fredericks	(England) Bournemouth	Released	
30 June 2022	LW	(England) Nathan Holland	(England) Milton Keynes Dons	Released	
30 June 2022	GK	(England) David Martin	(England) Milton Keynes Dons	Released	
30 June 2022	CM	(England) Mark Noble	Retired		
30 June 2022	CF	(England) Sonny Perkins	(England) Leeds United	Released	
30 June 2022	CM	(Brazil) Bernardo Rosa	(Czech Republic) FK Pardubice	Released	
30 June 2022	RW	(Ukraine) Andriy Yarmolenko	(United Arab Emirates) Al-Ain	Released	
15 July 2022	CB	(England) Aji Alese	(England) Sunderland	Undisclosed	
10 August 2022	CB	(France) Issa Diop	(England) Fulham	Undisclosed	
1 September 2022	CB	(Portugal) Gonçalo Cardoso	(Portugal) Marítimo	Undisclosed	
22 January 2023	CB	(England) Craig Dawson	(England) Wolverhampton Wanderers	Undisclosed	
23 January 2023	CM	(France) Pierre Ekwah	(England) Sunderland	Undisclosed	
26 January 2023	GK	(Republic of Ireland) Darren Randolph	(England) AFC Bournemouth	Undisclosed	
27 January 2023	RB	(England) Will Greenidge	(England) Colchester United	Undisclosed	
31 January 2023	RB	(Scotland) Harrison Ashby	(England) Newcastle United	Undisclosed	
31 January 2023	LB	(England) Emmanuel Longelo	(England) Birmingham City	Undisclosed	
17 April 2023	LB	(Democratic Republic of the Congo) Arthur Masuaku	(Turkey) Beşiktaş	Undisclosed	

=== Loans in ===
Date	Pos.	Player	Loaned from	On loan until	Notes	Ref.

=== Loans out ===
Date	Pos.	Player	Loaned to	On loan until	Ref
2 August 2022	LB	(Democratic Republic of the Congo) Arthur Masuaku	(Turkey) Beşiktaş	End of season	
5 August 2022	GK	(England) Jacob Knightbridge	(England) Harrow Borough	End of season	
11 August 2022	AM	(Croatia) Nikola Vlašić	(Italy) Torino	End of season	
14 August 2022	GK	(Ghana) Joseph Anang	(England) Derby County	23 January 2023 (Note: On 23 January, Anang was recalled from his season-long loan at Derby)	
16 August 2022	WM	(England) Thierry Nevers	(Wales) Newport County	6 January 2023 (Note: On 6 January, Nevers was recalled from his season-long loan at Newport and was subsequently loaned to Bradford)	
22 August 2022	GK	(England) Nathan Trott	(Denmark) Vejle	End of season	
26 August 2022	RM	(England) Daniel Chesters	(England) Colchester United	6 January 2023 (Note: On 6 January, Chesters was recalled from his season-long loan with Colchester)	
26 August 2022	CF	(Republic of Ireland) Mipo Odubeko	(England) Port Vale	End of season	
30 August 2022	LW	(Republic of Ireland) Armstrong Oko-Flex	(Wales) Swansea City	6 January 2023 (Note: On 6 January, Oko-Flex was recalled from his season-long loan with Swansea)	
30 August 2022	LB	(England) Emmanuel Longelo	(England) Birmingham City	31 January 2023 (Note: On 31 January, Longelo's season-long loan was ended and he signed for Birmingham permanently)	
10 January 2023	LW	(England) Thierry Nevers	(England) Bradford City	End of season	
20 January 2023	GK	(Scotland) Brian Kinnear	(Scotland) Falkirk	End of season	
26 January 2023	DM	(Republic of Ireland) Conor Coventry	(England) Rotherham United	End of season	

== Pre-season and friendlies ==
On 8 June, the Hammers confirmed their first set of pre-season friendlies. Ten days later, a trip to Switzerland to face Servette was added to the schedule. A sixth friendly match was confirmed on June 21, against UEFA Europa League finalists Rangers. A day later, the final friendly to be revealed was against Lens.

During the 2022 FIFA World Cup, West Ham travelled to Cambridge United for the testimonial of Greg Taylor, then to Italy to play Udinese and finally to Fulham for winter-break friendlies.

8 July 2022 Friendly	Servette (Switzerland)	0–2	(England) West Ham United	Lancy, Switzerland
18:00 CEST; 17:00 BST		Report	Alese 27'; Mubama 52'	Stadium: Stade de Genève; Attendance: 4,188

12 July 2022 Friendly	Ipswich Town (England)	1–2	(England) West Ham United	Ipswich
19:00 BST	Vincent-Young 75'	Report	Zouma 31'; Chesters 63'	Stadium: Portman Road; Attendance: 15,129; Referee: Keith Stroud

12 July 2022 Friendly	Boreham Wood (England)	1–1	(England) West Ham United	Borehamwood
19:00 BST	Evans 42'	Report	Benrahma 21'	Stadium: LV Bet Stadium Meadow Park; Referee: Dave Rock

16 July 2022 Friendly	Reading (England)	1–1	(England) West Ham United	Reading
15:00 BST	Méïté 68'	Report	Vlašić 51'	Stadium: Select Car Leasing Stadium; Referee: Keith Stroud

19 July 2022 Friendly	Rangers (Scotland)	3–1	(England) West Ham United	Glasgow, Scotland
19:45 BST	Lawrence 48'; Kent 50'; Matondo 57'	Report	Rice (yellow card) 45'; Souček 70'	Stadium: Ibrox Stadium; Attendance: 33,846; Referee: Nick Walsh

23 July 2022 Friendly	Luton Town (England)	1–1	(England) West Ham United	Luton
15:00 BST	Bradley 90+1'	Report	Souček 27'	Stadium: Kenilworth Road; Attendance: 7,010; Referee: Dean Whitestone

30 July 2022 Friendly	Lens (France)	0–0	(England) West Ham United	Lens, France
18:15 CEST; 17:15 BST	Costa (yellow card) 54'	Report	Souček (yellow card) 32'; Johnson (yellow card) 50'	Stadium: Stade Bollaert-Delelis; Attendance: 35,369; Referee: Marc Bollengier

6 December 2022 Greg Taylor testimonial	Cambridge United (England)	2–4	(England) West Ham United	Cambridge
19:00 GMT	Rossi 30'; Taylor 82' (pen.)	Report	Bowen 31'; Simper 44' (o.g.); Benrahma 70'; Ekwah 73'	Stadium: Abbey Stadium; Attendance: 2,805; Referee: Neil Hair

10 December 2022 Friendly	Udinese (Italy)	1–3	(England) West Ham United	Udine, Italy
15:00 CET; 14:00 GMT	Pereyra 13'	Report	Benrahma 45+1'; Lanzini 70'; Antonio 89'	Stadium: Stadio Friuli; Referee: Daniele Chiffi

17 December 2022 Friendly	Fulham (England)	1–1	(England) West Ham United	Fulham
13:00 GMT	Carlos Vinícius 42'	Report	Bowen 62'	Stadium: Craven Cottage; Attendance: 9,625; Referee: John Brooks

== Competitions ==
=== Overall record ===
Competition	First match	Last match	Starting round	Final position	Record							
Competition	First match	Last match	Starting round	Final position	Pld	W	D	L	GF	GA	GD	Win %
Premier League	7 August 2022	28 May 2023	Matchday 1	14th	38	11	7	20	42	55	−13	28.95
FA Cup	7 January 2023	1 March 2023	Third round	Fifth round	3	2	0	1	4	3	+1	66.67
EFL Cup	9 November 2022		Third round	Third round	1	0	1	0	2	2	+0	0.00
UEFA Europa Conference League	18 August 2022	7 June 2023	Play-off round	Winners	15	14	1	0	35	9	+26	93.33
Total					57	27	9	21	83	69	+14	47.37

Source: Soccerway

=== Premier League ===
==== League table ====
Pos	Team	Pld	W	D	L	GF	GA	GD	Pts	Qualification or relegation
12	Chelsea	38	11	11	16	38	47	−9	44	
13	Wolverhampton Wanderers	38	11	8	19	31	58	−27	41	
14	West Ham United	38	11	7	20	42	55	−13	40	Qualification to Europa League group stage (Note: West Ham United qualified for the Europa League group stage by winning the 2022–23 UEFA Europa Conference League.)
15	Bournemouth	38	11	6	21	37	71	−34	39	
16	Nottingham Forest	38	9	11	18	38	68	−30	38	

Source: Premier League
Rules for classification: 1) Points; 2) Goal difference; 3) Goals scored; 4) If the champions, relegated teams or qualified teams for UEFA competitions cannot be determined by rules 1 to 3, rules 4.1 to 4.3 are applied – 4.1) Points gained in head-to-head record between such teams; 4.2) Away goals scored in head-to-head record between such teams; 4.3) Play-offs

==== Results summary ====
Overall								Home						Away					
Pld	W	D	L	GF	GA	GD	Pts	W	D	L	GF	GA	GD	W	D	L	GF	GA	GD
38	11	7	20	42	55	−13	40	8	4	7	26	24	+2	3	3	13	16	31	−15

Source: Premier League

==== Results by round ====
Round	1	2	3	4	5	6	7	8	9	10	11	12	13	14	15	16	17	18	19	20	21	22	23	24	25	26	27	28	29	30	31	32	33	34	35	36	37	38
Ground	H	A	H	A	H	A	A	H	H	A	A	H	A	H	H	A	H	A	A	H	A	H	A	H	A	H	H	H	A	H	A	H	A	A	H	A	H	A
Result	L	L	L	W	D	L	L	W	W	D	L	W	L	L	L	L	L	D	L	W	D	D	L	W	L	D	W	L	W	D	W	L	L	L	W	L	W	L
Position	19	19	20	16	14	18	18	15	13	12	13	10	13	15	16	16	17	17	18	16	17	16	18	16	16	17	15	15	14	15	13	15	15	15	15	15	14	14

Source: Premier League
A = Away; H = Home; W = Win; D = Draw; L = Loss; P = Postponed

==== Matches ====
Win Draw Loss Fixtures

On 16 June, the Premier League fixtures were released.

7 August 2022 1	West Ham United	0–2	Manchester City	Stratford
16:30 BST		Report	Haaland 36' (pen.), 65'; Cancelo (yellow card) 45+3'	Stadium: London Stadium; Attendance: 62,443; Referee: Michael Oliver

14 August 2022 2	Nottingham Forest	1–0	West Ham United	West Bridgford
14:00 BST	Awoniyi 45+2'; McKenna (yellow card) 64'; Henderson (yellow card) 75'; Johnson (yellow card) 90+8'; Surridge (yellow card) 90+8'	Report	Rice (yellow card) 9', (penalty missed) 65'	Stadium: City Ground; Attendance: 29,281; Referee: Robert Jones
Note: The match was originally scheduled for 13 August at 15:00 BST.

21 August 2022 3	West Ham United	0–2	Brighton & Hove Albion	Stratford
14:00 BST	Kehrer (yellow card) 20'; Cresswell (yellow card) 71'	Report	Mac Allister 22' (pen.); Trossard 66'	Stadium: London Stadium; Attendance: 62,449; Referee: Anthony Taylor

28 August 2022 4	Aston Villa	0–1	West Ham United	Aston
14:00 BST	Cash (yellow card) 57'; Kamara (yellow card) 79'	Report	Fornals 74'	Stadium: Villa Park; Attendance: 41,796; Referee: David Coote

31 August 2022 5	West Ham United	1–1	Tottenham Hotspur	Stratford
19:45 BST	Souček 55'; Paquetá (yellow card) 90+1'; Emerson (yellow card) 90+1'	Report	Bissouma (yellow card) 21'; Sánchez (yellow card) 23'; Kehrer 34' (o.g.); Davies (yellow card) 86'; Richarlison (yellow card) 90+1'; Perišić (yellow card) 90+3'	Stadium: London Stadium; Attendance: 62,450; Referee: Peter Bankes
Note: The match was originally scheduled for 30 August at 19:45 BST.

3 September 2022 6	Chelsea	2–1	West Ham United	Fulham
15:00 BST	Loftus-Cheek (yellow card) 9'; Cucurella (yellow card) 35'; James (yellow card) 54'; Chilwell 76'; Havertz 88', (yellow card) 90+8'	Report	Antonio (yellow card) 54', (goal) 62'; Kehrer (yellow card) 90+3'	Stadium: Stamford Bridge; Attendance: 39,923; Referee: Andrew Madley
Note: The match was originally scheduled for 4 September at 14:00 BST, but it was rescheduled due to Chelsea's participation in the UEFA Champions League group stage.

18 September 2022 7	Everton	1–0	West Ham United	Liverpool
14:15 BST	Coady (yellow card) 28'; Maupay 53'; Gordon (yellow card) 62'; McNeil (yellow card) 90+4'	Report	Scamacca (yellow card) 90+5'	Stadium: Goodison Park; Attendance: 39,298; Referee: Michael Oliver
Note: The match was originally scheduled for 17 September at 15:00 BST, but itnwas rescheduled due to West Ham's participation in the UEFA Europa Conference League group stage.

1 October 2022 8	West Ham United	2–0	Wolverhampton Wanderers	Stratford
17:30 BST	Scamacca 29'; Rice (yellow card) 52'; Bowen 54'; Cresswell (yellow card) 83'	Report	Neves (yellow card) 14'; Moutinho (yellow card) 22'	Stadium: London Stadium; Attendance: 62,437; Referee: Paul Tierney

9 October 2022 9	West Ham United	3–1	Fulham	Stratford
14:00 BST	Bowen 29' (pen.); Scamacca 62'; Kehrer (yellow card) 83'; Antonio 90+1'	Report	A. Pereira 5', (yellow card) 27'; Reed (yellow card) 58'; Carlos Vinícius (yellow card) 66'	Stadium: London Stadium; Attendance: 62,454; Referee: Chris Kavanagh
Note: The match was originally scheduled for 8 October at 15:00 BST, but it was rescheduled due to West Ham's participation in the UEFA Europa Conference League group stage.

16 October 2022 10	Southampton	1–1	West Ham United	Southampton
14:00 BST	Perraud 20'; Walker-Peters (yellow card) 44'	Report	Coufal (yellow card) 52'; Rice 64'	Stadium: St Mary's Stadium; Attendance: 29,159; Referee: Peter Bankes
Note: The match was originally scheduled for 15 October at 15:00 BST, but it was rescheduled due to West Ham's participation in the UEFA Europa Conference League group stage.

19 October 2022 11	Liverpool	1–0	West Ham United	Liverpool
19:30 BST	Núñez 22'	Report	Bowen (penalty missed) 45'	Stadium: Anfield; Attendance: 53,346; Referee: Stuart Attwell

24 October 2022 12	West Ham United	2–0	Bournemouth	Stratford
20:00 BST	Zouma 45'; Benrahma 90+2' (pen.)	Report	Lerma (yellow card) 55'; Mepham (yellow card) 71'	Stadium: London Stadium; Attendance: 62,447; Referee: David Coote

30 October 2022 13	Manchester United	1–0	West Ham United	Manchester
16:15 GMT	Rashford 38'; Fernandes (yellow card) 90'	Report	Scamacca (yellow card) 36'; Souček (yellow card) 72'; Kehrer (yellow card) 78'	Stadium: Old Trafford; Attendance: 73,682; Referee: Chris Kavanagh
Note: The match was originally scheduled to kick off at 16:30 GMT, but it was pushed forward by 15 minutes due to an agreement between the clubs and broadcaster Sky Sports.

6 November 2022 14	West Ham United	1–2	Crystal Palace	Stratford
14:00 GMT	Benrahma 20'; Dawson (yellow card) 58'	Report	Zaha 41'; Ayew (yellow card) 88'; Olise 90+4'	Stadium: London Stadium; Attendance: 62,451; Referee: Paul Tierney

12 November 2022 15	West Ham United	0–2	Leicester City	Stratford
15:00 GMT	Dawson (yellow card) 41'; Paquetá (yellow card) 60'; Scamacca (yellow card) 85'	Report	Maddison 8'; Tielemans (penalty missed) 42'; Ndidi (yellow card) 62'; Barnes 78'	Stadium: London Stadium; Attendance: 62,459; Referee: Jarred Gillett

Mid-season break for 2022 FIFA World Cup

26 December 2022 16	Arsenal	3–1	West Ham United	Holloway
20:00 GMT	Saka 53'; Martinelli 58'; Nketiah 69'	Report	Bowen (yellow card) 8'; Benrahma 27' (pen.); Coufal (yellow card) 44'	Stadium: Emirates Stadium; Attendance: 60,125; Referee: Michael Oliver

30 December 2022 17	West Ham United	0–2	Brentford	Stratford
19:45 GMT	Coufal (yellow card) 70'	Report	Toney 18'; Dasilva 43'	Stadium: London Stadium; Attendance: 62,467; Referee: Darren England
Note: The match was originally scheduled for 31 December at 15:00 GMT, but it was moved to 30 December at 19:45 GMT to maintain a rest period between matchweeks 18 and 19.

4 January 2023 18	Leeds United	2–2	West Ham United	Leeds
19:45 GMT	Rodrigo (yellow card) 8', (goal) 70'; Gnonto 27'; Cooper (yellow card) 40'; Summerville (yellow card) 59'	Report	Paquetá 45' (pen.); Scamacca 46'; Aguerd (yellow card) 90+5'	Stadium: Elland Road; Attendance: 36,173; Referee: David Coote
Note: The match was originally scheduled for 2 January at 15:00 GMT but was delayed to 4 January at 19:45 GMT to maintain a rest period between matchweeks 18 and 19.

14 January 2023 19	Wolverhampton Wanderers	1–0	West Ham United	Wolverhampton
15:00 GMT	Podence 48'	Report	Aguerd (yellow card) 70'; Rice (yellow card) 90+3'	Stadium: Molineux Stadium; Attendance: 31,511; Referee: Simon Hooper

21 January 2023 20	West Ham United	2–0	Everton	Stratford
15:00 GMT	Bowen 34', 41'; Paquetá (yellow card) 50'	Report	Tarkowski (yellow card) 67'	Stadium: London Stadium; Attendance: 62,470; Referee: Stuart Attwell

4 February 2023 21	Newcastle United	1–1	West Ham United	Newcastle
17:30 GMT	Wilson 3'; Willock (yellow card) 45'; Joelinton (yellow card) 57'	Report	Paquetá 32'; Aguerd (yellow card) 90+1'	Stadium: St James' Park; Attendance: 52,256; Referee: Peter Bankes
Note: The match was originally scheduled to kick off at 15:00 GMT.

11 February 2023 22	West Ham United	1–1	Chelsea	Stratford
12:30 GMT	Emerson 28'; Coufal (yellow card) 55'	Report	Félix 16'; Badiashile (yellow card) 64'	Stadium: London Stadium; Attendance: 62,471; Referee: Craig Pawson
Note: The match was originally scheduled to kick off at 15:00 GMT.

19 February 2023 23	Tottenham Hotspur	2–0	West Ham United	Tottenham
16:30 GMT	Skipp (yellow card) 9'; Emerson 56'; Son Heung-min 72'; Perišić (yellow card) 90+3'	Report	Antonio (yellow card) 62'	Stadium: Tottenham Hotspur Stadium; Attendance: 61,476; Referee: Michael Oliver
Note: The match was originally scheduled to kick off at 15:00 GMT.

25 February 2023 24	West Ham United	4–0	Nottingham Forest	Stratford
15:00 GMT	Ings 70', 73'; Rice 78'; Antonio 85'	Report		Stadium: London Stadium; Attendance: 62,469; Referee: Jarred Gillett

4 March 2023 25	Brighton & Hove Albion	4–0	West Ham United	Falmer
15:00 GMT	Mac Allister 18' (pen.); Veltman 51'; Mitoma 69'; Welbeck 89'	Report	Souček (yellow card) 55'; Bowen (yellow card) 58'; Rice (yellow card) 60'	Stadium: American Express Community Stadium; Attendance: 31,523; Referee: Stuart Attwell

12 March 2023 26	West Ham United	1–1	Aston Villa	Stratford
14:00 GMT	Benrahma 26' (pen.); Paquetá (yellow card) 70'	Report	Watkins 17'	Stadium: London Stadium; Attendance: 62,472; Referee: Chris Kavanagh
Note: The match was originally scheduled for 11 March at 15:00 GMT but was rescheduled due to West Ham's participation in the UEFA Europa Conference League knockout phase.

2 April 2023 27	West Ham United	1–0	Southampton	Stratford
14:00 BST	Aguerd 25'	Report	Ćaleta-Car (yellow card) 43'; Bednarek (yellow card) 74'	Stadium: London Stadium; Attendance: 62,465; Referee: Paul Tierney
Note: The match was originally scheduled for 1 April at 15:00 GMT.

5 April 2023 28	West Ham United	1–5	Newcastle United	Stratford
20:00 BST	Zouma 40'; Emerson (yellow card) 42'; Downes (yellow card) 88'	Report	Wilson 6', 46'; Joelinton 13', 90', (yellow card) 52'; Isak 82'	Stadium: London Stadium; Attendance: 62,470; Referee: Craig Pawson
Note: The match was originally scheduled for 10 September at 15:00 BST, then for 11 September at 14:00 BST, before it was postponed due to the death of Queen Elizabeth II.

8 April 2023 29	Fulham	0–1	West Ham United	Fulham
15:00 BST	Carlos Vinícius (yellow card) 62'	Report	Reed 23' (o.g.); Rice (yellow card) 73'	Stadium: Craven Cottage; Attendance: 24,491; Referee: Jarred Gillett

16 April 2023 30	West Ham United	2–2	Arsenal	Stratford
14:00 BST	Benrahma 33' (pen.); Bowen 54'; Cresswell (yellow card) 82'	Report	Gabriel Jesus 7', (yellow card) 45+4'; Ødegaard 10'; Partey (yellow card) 35'; Saka (penalty missed) 52'	Stadium: London Stadium; Attendance: 62,475; Referee: David Coote

23 April 2023 31	Bournemouth	0–4	West Ham United	Bournemouth
14:00 BST	Moore (yellow card) 48'	Report	Antonio 5'; Paquetá 12'; Rice 43'; Aguerd (yellow card) 56'; Fabiański (yellow card) 67'; Fornals 72'	Stadium: Vitality Stadium; Attendance: 10,465; Referee: Anthony Taylor

26 April 2023 32	West Ham United	1–2	Liverpool	Stratford
19:45 BST	Paquetá 12'	Report	Gakpo 18'; Matip 67'	Stadium: London Stadium; Attendance: 62,473; Referee: Chris Kavanagh

29 April 2023 33	Crystal Palace	4–3	West Ham United	Selhurst
12:45 BST	Ayew 15', (yellow card) 15'; Zaha 20'; Schlupp 30'; Eze 66' (pen.)	Report	Souček 9', (yellow card) 24'; Antonio 35'; Coufal (yellow card) 58'; Aguerd 72'	Stadium: Selhurst Park; Attendance: 25,148; Referee: Craig Pawson
Note: The match was originally scheduled to kick-off at 12:30 BST, but was delayed 15 minutes due to issues with ticket barriers.

3 May 2023 34	Manchester City	3–0	West Ham United	Manchester
20:00 BST	Aké 50'; Haaland 70'; Foden 85'	Report	Downes (yellow card) 49'	Stadium: City of Manchester Stadium; Attendance: 53,305; Referee: John Brooks
Note: The match was originally scheduled for 18 March at 15:00 GMT, then for 19 March at 16:30 GMT, before being postponed due to Manchester City's participation in the quarter-finals of the FA Cup.

7 May 2023 35	West Ham United	1–0	Manchester United	Stratford
19:00 BST	Benrahma 27'	Report	Malacia (yellow card) 36'; Wan-Bissaka (yellow card) 64'	Stadium: London Stadium; Attendance: 62,477; Referee: Peter Bankes

14 May 2023 36	Brentford	2–0	West Ham United	Brentford
14:00 BST	Mbeumo 20'; Wissa 43'; Hickey (yellow card) 76'	Report		Stadium: Gtech Community Stadium; Attendance: 17,075; Referee: Michael Oliver

21 May 2023 37	West Ham United	3–1	Leeds United	Stratford
13:30 BST	Rice 32'; Paquetá (yellow card) 65'; Bowen 72'; Lanzini 90+4'	Report	Rodrigo 17', (yellow card) 82'; Summerville (yellow card) 80'; Koch (yellow card) 88'	Stadium: London Stadium; Attendance: 62,478; Referee: Peter Bankes

28 May 2023 38	Leicester City	2–1	West Ham United	Leicester
16:30 BST	Barnes 34'; Faes 62'; Evans (yellow card) 66'	Report	Ings (yellow card) 67'; Fornals 79'	Stadium: King Power Stadium; Attendance: 32,183; Referee: Simon Hooper

=== FA Cup ===
As a Premier League team, West Ham entered the competition in the third round proper. In the draw made on 28 November, they were drawn away to Brentford. The Hammers won the match 1–0, with a goal from Saïd Benrahma sealing their progression to the fourth round. In the draw made on 8 January, they were drawn away to Derby County. In the fifth round, the Hammers were drawn away again, against Manchester United. The Hammers lost the match 3–1, with their only goal coming through Benrahma and Manchester United's goals coming through a Nayef Aguerd own goal, Alejandro Garnacho and Fred.

Win Draw Loss Fixtures

7 January 2023 Third round	Brentford	0–1	West Ham United	Brentford
17:30 GMT	Wissa (yellow card) 64'	Report	Dawson (yellow card) 73'; Benrahma 79'	Stadium: Gtech Community Stadium; Attendance: 16,725; Referee: Andre Marriner

30 January 2023 Fourth round	Derby County	0–2	West Ham United	Derby
19:45 GMT	Smith (yellow card) 22'	Report	Bowen 10'; Antonio 50'; Souček (yellow card) 70'	Stadium: Pride Park Stadium; Attendance: 25,308; Referee: Thomas Bramall

1 March 2023 Fifth round	Manchester United	3–1	West Ham United	Manchester
19:45 GMT	Maguire (yellow card) 27'; McTominay (yellow card) 32'; Aguerd 77' (o.g.); Garnacho 90'; Fred 90+5'	Report	Benrahma 54'; Paquetá (yellow card) 82'	Stadium: Old Trafford; Attendance: 72,571; Referee: Michael Salisbury

=== EFL Cup ===
As West Ham were involved in the UEFA Europa Conference League, they entered the competition in the third round. In the draw made on 24 August, they were drawn at home to Blackburn Rovers. The Hammers were knocked out by Blackburn in a 10–9 penalty shoot-out after a 2–2 draw, with West Ham's goals coming from Pablo Fornals and Michail Antonio and Blackburn's from Jack Vale and Ben Brereton Díaz. Blackburn scored 10 of their penalties with only the goalkeeper left to take a penalty. Taking West Ham's 10th penalty, defender Angelo Ogbonna hit the bar sending Blackburn through to the next round.

Win Draw Loss Fixtures

9 November 2022 Third round	West Ham United	2–2 (9–10 p)	Blackburn Rovers	Stratford
19:45 GMT	Fornals 38'; Antonio 78'	Report	Vale 6'; Carter (yellow card) 9'; Szmodics (yellow card) 76'; Brereton 88'	Stadium: London Stadium; Attendance: 40,534; Referee: Thomas Bramall
	Penalties
	Benrahma (penalty scored); Bowen (penalty scored); Scamacca (penalty scored); Antonio (penalty scored); Lanzini (penalty scored); Johnson (penalty scored); Cresswell (penalty scored); Downes (penalty scored); Aguerd (penalty scored); Ogbonna (penalty missed)		(penalty scored) Brereton; (penalty scored) Hyam; (penalty scored) Dolan; (penalty scored) Buckley; (penalty scored) Szmodics; (penalty scored) Edun; (penalty scored) Rankin-Costello; (penalty scored) Carter; (penalty scored) Hirst; (penalty scored) Garrett

=== UEFA Europa Conference League ===
The Hammers entered the competition in the play-off qualification round, and were drawn against Viborg.

Win Draw Loss Fixtures

==== Play-off round ====
18 August 2022 First leg	West Ham United (England)	3–1	(Denmark) Viborg	London, England
19:45 BST	Scamacca 24'; Bowen 64'; Antonio 78'	Report	Søndergaard (yellow card) 68'; Bonde 69'	Stadium: London Stadium; Attendance: 30,230; Referee: Marco Di Bello (Italy)

25 August 2022 Second leg	Viborg (Denmark)	0–3 (1–6 agg.)	(England) West Ham United	Viborg, Denmark
19:00 CEST; 18:00 BST	Said (yellow card) 58'	Report	Scamacca 22'; Benrahma 51'; Cresswell (yellow card) 58'; Souček 63'; Antonio (yellow card) 87'	Stadium: Viborg Stadion; Attendance: 8,435; Referee: Harald Lechner (Austria)

==== Group stage ====
West Ham drew FCSB, Anderlecht and Silkeborg in the group stage. The fixtures were announced on 27 August.

Pos	Team	Pld	W	D	L	GF	GA	GD	Pts	Qualification	WHU	AND	SIL	FCSB
1	(England) West Ham United	6	6	0	0	13	4	+9	18	Advance to round of 16	—	2–1	1–0	3–1
2	(Belgium) Anderlecht	6	2	2	2	6	5	+1	8	Advance to knockout round play-offs	0–1	—	1–0	2–2
3	(Denmark) Silkeborg	6	2	0	4	12	7	+5	6		2–3	0–2	—	5–0
4	(Romania) FCSB	6	0	2	4	3	18	−15	2		0–3	0–0	0–5	—

Source: UEFA
Rules for classification: Group stage tiebreakers

8 September 2022 1	West Ham United (England)	3–1	(Romania) FCSB	London, England
20:00 BST	Cornet (yellow card) 39'; Ogbonna (yellow card) 47'; Emerson (yellow card) 54', (goal) 75'; Bowen 69' (pen.); Antonio 90'	Report	Cordea 34'; Dawa (yellow card) 61'; Târnovanu (yellow card) 66'; Oaidă (yellow card) 83'	Stadium: London Stadium; Attendance: 39,536; Referee: Benoît Bastien (France)

15 September 2022 2	Silkeborg (Denmark)	2–3	(England) West Ham United	Silkeborg, Denmark
21:00 CEST; 20:00 BST	Kusk 6'; Salquist (yellow card) 12'; Klynge (yellow card) 22'; Tengstedt 75'	Report	Lanzini 13' (pen.); Scamacca 25'; Dawson 38'; Cresswell (yellow card) 89'	Stadium: Silkeborg Stadium; Attendance: 6,702; Referee: Fábio Veríssimo (Portugal)

6 October 2022 3	Anderlecht (Belgium)	0–1	(England) West Ham United	Brussels, Belgium
18:45 CEST; 17:45 BST	Delcroix (yellow card) 75'	Report	Lanzini (yellow card) 67'; Ogbonna (yellow card) 73'; Scamacca 79'; Coufal (yellow card) 82'; Downes (yellow card) 90+3'	Stadium: Constant Vanden Stock Stadium; Attendance: 17,033; Referee: Novak Simović (Serbia)

13 October 2022 4	West Ham United (England)	2–1	(Belgium) Anderlecht	London, England
20:00 BST	Benrahma 14'; Bowen 30'; Paquetá (yellow card) 36'; Downes (yellow card) 59'; Johnson (yellow card) 88'	Report	Arnstad (yellow card) 9'; Esposito 89' (pen.)	Stadium: London Stadium; Attendance: 40,767; Referee: Willy Delajod (France)

27 October 2022 5	West Ham United (England)	1–0	(Denmark) Silkeborg	London, England
20:00 BST	Lanzini 24' (pen.); Coventry (yellow card) 37'; Scamacca (yellow card) 80'; Souček (yellow card) 90+1'	Report	Klitten (yellow card) 76'	Stadium: London Stadium; Attendance: 35,911; Referee: Joni Hyytiä (Finland)

3 November 2022 6	FCSB (Romania)	0–3	(England) West Ham United	Bucharest, Romania
22:00 EET; 20:00 GMT		Report	Aguerd (yellow card) 32'; Fornals 40', 65'; Dawa 56' (o.g.); Mubama (yellow card) 71'; Scarles (yellow card) 73'	Stadium: Arena Națională; Attendance: 20,172; Referee: Sascha Stegemann (Germany)

==== Knockout phase ====
The draw for the round of 16 was announced on 24 February, with West Ham facing AEK Larnaca.

===== Round of 16 =====
9 March 2023 First leg	AEK Larnaca (Cyprus)	0–2	(England) West Ham United	Larnaca, Cyprus
19:45 EET; 17:45 GMT		Report	Antonio 36', 45+2'; Downes (yellow card) 68'; Kehrer (yellow card) 87'	Stadium: AEK Arena; Attendance: 6,654; Referee: Espen Eskås (Norway)

16 March 2023 Second leg	West Ham United (England)	4–0 (6–0 agg.)	(Cyprus) AEK Larnaca	London, England
20:00 GMT	Scamacca 21'; Bowen 47', 49'; Mubama 65', (yellow card) 67'	Report	Ledes (red card) 44'	Stadium: London Stadium; Attendance: 40,482; Referee: Georgi Kabakov (Bulgaria)

===== Quarter-finals =====
The draw for the quarter-finals was announced on 17 March, with West Ham facing Belgian club Gent.

13 April 2023 First leg	Gent (Belgium)	1–1	(England) West Ham United	Ghent, Belgium
18:45 CEST; 17:45 BST	De Sart (yellow card) 47'; Cuypers 56'; Piątkowski (yellow card) 73'	Report	Downes (yellow card) 23'; Ogbonna (yellow card) 34'; Ings 45+3'; Coufal (yellow card) 87'	Stadium: Ghelamco Arena; Attendance: 19,037; Referee: Tasos Sidiropoulos (Greece)

20 April 2023 Second leg	West Ham United (England)	4–1 (5–2 agg.)	(Belgium) Gent	London, England
20:00 BST	Antonio 37', 63'; Paquetá 56' (pen.); Rice 58'	Report	Orban (yellow card) 18'; Cuypers 26'	Stadium: London Stadium; Attendance: 53,475; Referee: Orel Grinfeld (Israel)

===== Semi-finals =====
The draw for the semi-finals was conducted on 17 March, after the quarter-finals draw.

11 May 2023 First leg	West Ham United (England)	2–1	(Netherlands) AZ	London, England
20:00 BST	Paquetá (yellow card) 57'; Benrahma 67' (pen.); Antonio 76'	Report	M. de Wit (yellow card) 16'; Reijnders 41'; Clasie (yellow card) 58'; Ryan (yellow card) 65'	Stadium: London Stadium; Attendance: 62,471; Referee: Halil Umut Meler (Turkey)

18 May 2023 Second leg	AZ (Netherlands)	0–1 (1–3 agg.)	(England) West Ham United	Alkmaar, Netherlands
21:00 CEST; 20:00 BST		Report	Souček (yellow card) 60'; Kehrer (yellow card) 64'; Fornals 90+4'	Stadium: AFAS Stadion; Attendance: 19,000; Referee: Ivan Kružliak (Slovakia)

===== Final =====
The draw for the final was held on 17 March 2023, after the draws for the quarter-finals and semi-finals, to determine the "home" team for administrative purposes.

7 June 2023 Final	Fiorentina (Italy)	1–2	(England) West Ham United	Prague, Czech Republic
21:00 CEST; 20:00 BST	Mandragora (yellow card) 66'; Bonaventura 67'; Duncan (yellow card) 67'; Milenković (yellow card) 75'; Amrabat (yellow card) 85'	Report	Benrahma (yellow card) 31', (goal) 62' (pen.); Aguerd (yellow card) 53'; Bowen 90', (yellow card) 90+7'; Cresswell (yellow card) 90+1'	Stadium: Fortuna Arena; Attendance: 17,363; Referee: Carlos del Cerro Grande (Spain)

== Statistics ==
- Correct as of match played 7 June 2023

=== Appearances and goals ===
No.	Pos	Nat	Player	Total		Premier League		FA Cup		EFL Cup		Europa Conference League	
No.	Pos	Nat	Player	Apps	Goals	Apps	Goals	Apps	Goals	Apps	Goals	Apps	Goals
Goalkeepers
1	GK	(Poland) POL	Łukasz Fabiański	37	0	36	0	1	0	0	0	0	0
13	GK	(France) FRA	Alphonse Areola	23	0	2+3	0	2	0	1	0	15	0
Defenders
2	DF	(England) ENG	Ben Johnson	29	0	9+8	0	3	0	1	0	8	0
3	DF	(England) ENG	Aaron Cresswell	38	0	24+4	0	0+1	0	0+1	0	7+1	0
4	DF	(France) FRA	Kurt Zouma	32	2	24+1	2	0	0	0	0	6+1	0
5	DF	(Czech Republic) CZE	Vladimír Coufal	38	0	24+3	0	0	0	1	0	10	0
21	DF	(Italy) ITA	Angelo Ogbonna	30	0	13+3	0	3	0	1	0	9+1	0
24	DF	(Germany) GER	Thilo Kehrer	38	0	25+2	0	1	0	0	0	6+4	0
27	DF	(Morocco) MAR	Nayef Aguerd	30	2	17+1	2	3	0	1	0	8	0
33	DF	(Italy) ITA	Emerson	34	2	17+5	1	3	0	1	0	8	1
53	DF	(England) ENG	Levi Laing	1	0	0	0	0	0	0	0	0+1	0
Midfielders
8	MF	(Spain) ESP	Pablo Fornals	50	7	17+15	3	2+1	0	1	1	5+9	3
10	MF	(Argentina) ARG	Manuel Lanzini	23	3	2+8	1	0+1	0	1	0	11	2
11	MF	(Brazil) BRA	Lucas Paquetá	41	5	27+1	4	2	0	0	0	7+4	1
12	MF	(England) ENG	Flynn Downes	35	0	7+14	0	1+1	0	1	0	6+5	0
28	MF	(Czech Republic) CZE	Tomáš Souček	50	3	32+4	2	3	0	0	0	7+4	1
40	MF	(Republic of Ireland) IRL	Armstrong Oko-Flex	1	0	0	0	0	0	0	0	0+1	0
41	MF	(England) ENG	Declan Rice	50	5	36+1	4	2	0	0	0	7+4	1
58	MF	(England) ENG	Kamarai Simon-Swyer	1	0	0	0	0	0	0	0	0+1	0
59	MF	(England) ENG	Keenan Forson	1	0	0	0	0	0	0	0	0+1	0
62	MF	(England) ENG	Freddie Potts	2	0	0	0	0	0	0	0	0+2	0
68	MF	(England) ENG	Oliver Scarles	1	0	0	0	0	0	0	0	1	0
70	MF	(England) ENG	Kaelan Casey	1	0	0	0	0	0	0	0	0+1	0
Forwards
7	FW	(Italy) ITA	Gianluca Scamacca	27	8	11+5	3	0+1	0	0+1	0	5+4	5
9	FW	(Jamaica) JAM	Michail Antonio	48	14	21+12	5	3	1	1	1	7+4	7
14	FW	(Ivory Coast) CIV	Maxwel Cornet	21	0	2+12	0	0	0	0	0	4+3	0
18	FW	(England) ENG	Danny Ings	22	3	7+10	2	0	0	0	0	1+4	1
20	FW	(England) ENG	Jarrod Bowen	54	13	36+2	6	2+1	1	0+1	0	9+3	6
22	FW	(Algeria) ALG	Saïd Benrahma	52	12	22+13	6	1+2	2	0+1	0	10+3	4
72	FW	(England) ENG	Divin Mubama	6	1	0+3	0	0+1	0	0	0	1+1	1
Players who left the club permanently or on loan during the season
15	DF	(England) ENG	Craig Dawson	13	1	8	0	1	0	0	0	2+2	1
32	MF	(Republic of Ireland) IRL	Conor Coventry	7	0	0+1	0	0	0	1	0	3+2	0
50	DF	(Scotland) SCO	Harrison Ashby	2	0	0	0	0	0	0	0	1+1	0

=== Goalscorers ===
Rank	Pos	No.	Nat	Name	Premier League	FA Cup	EFL Cup	UECL	Total
1	FW	9	(Jamaica)	Michail Antonio	5	1	1	7	14
2	FW	20	(England)	Jarrod Bowen	6	1	0	6	13
3	FW	22	(Algeria)	Saïd Benrahma	6	2	0	4	12
4	FW	7	(Italy)	Gianluca Scamacca	3	0	0	5	8
5	MF	8	(Spain)	Pablo Fornals	3	0	1	3	7
6=	MF	11	(Brazil)	Lucas Paquetá	4	0	0	1	5
6=	MF	41	(England)	Declan Rice	4	0	0	1	5
8=	MF	10	(Argentina)	Manuel Lanzini	1	0	0	2	3
8=	FW	18	(England)	Danny Ings	2	0	0	1	3
8=	MF	28	(Czech Republic)	Tomáš Souček	2	0	0	1	3
11=	DF	4	(France)	Kurt Zouma	2	0	0	0	2
11=	DF	27	(Morocco)	Nayef Aguerd	2	0	0	0	2
11=	DF	33	(Italy)	Emerson Palmieri	1	0	0	1	2
14=	DF	15	(England)	Craig Dawson	0	0	0	1	1
14=	FW	72	(England)	Divin Mubama	0	0	0	1	1
Own goals					1	0	0	1	2
Totals					42	4	2	35	83

=== Discipline ===
No.	Pos	Name	Premier League			FA Cup			EFL Cup			UECL			Total		
No.	Pos	Name	Yellow card	(yellow card) (yellow-red card)	Red card	Yellow card	(yellow card) (yellow-red card)	Red card	Yellow card	(yellow card) (yellow-red card)	Red card	Yellow card	(yellow card) (yellow-red card)	Red card	Yellow card	(yellow card) (yellow-red card)	Red card
Goalkeepers
1	DF	(Poland) Łukasz Fabiański	1	0	0	0	0	0	0	0	0	0	0	0	1	0	0
Defenders
2	DF	(England) Ben Johnson	0	0	0	0	0	0	0	0	0	1	0	0	1	0	0
3	DF	(England) Aaron Cresswell	3	0	0	0	0	0	0	0	0	3	0	0	6	0	0
5	DF	(Czech Republic) Vladimír Coufal	5	0	0	0	0	0	0	0	0	2	0	0	7	0	0
21	DF	(Italy) Angelo Ogbonna	0	0	0	0	0	0	0	0	0	3	0	0	3	0	0
24	DF	(Germany) Thilo Kehrer	4	0	0	0	0	0	0	0	0	2	0	0	6	0	0
27	DF	(Morocco) Nayef Aguerd	4	0	0	0	0	0	0	0	0	2	0	0	6	0	0
33	DF	(Italy) Emerson Palmieri	2	0	0	0	0	0	0	0	0	1	0	0	3	0	0
Midfielders
10	MF	(Argentina) Manuel Lanzini	0	0	0	0	0	0	0	0	0	1	0	0	1	0	0
11	MF	(Brazil) Lucas Paquetá	5	0	0	1	0	0	0	0	0	2	0	0	8	0	0
12	MF	(England) Flynn Downes	2	0	0	0	0	0	0	0	0	4	0	0	6	0	0
28	MF	(Czech Republic) Tomáš Souček	3	0	0	1	0	0	0	0	0	2	0	0	6	0	0
41	MF	(England) Declan Rice	5	0	0	0	0	0	0	0	0	0	0	0	5	0	0
68	MF	(England) Oliver Scarles	0	0	0	0	0	0	0	0	0	1	0	0	1	0	0
Forwards
7	FW	(Italy) Gianluca Scamacca	3	0	0	0	0	0	0	0	0	1	0	0	4	0	0
9	FW	(Jamaica) Michail Antonio	2	0	0	0	0	0	0	0	0	1	0	0	3	0	0
14	FW	(Ivory Coast) Maxwel Cornet	0	0	0	0	0	0	0	0	0	1	0	0	1	0	0
18	FW	(England) Danny Ings	1	0	0	0	0	0	0	0	0	0	0	0	1	0	0
20	FW	(England) Jarrod Bowen	2	0	0	0	0	0	0	0	0	1	0	0	3	0	0
22	FW	(Algeria) Saïd Benrahma	0	0	0	0	0	0	0	0	0	1	0	0	1	0	0
72	FW	(England) Divin Mubama	0	0	0	0	0	0	0	0	0	2	0	0	2	0	0
Players who left the club permanently or on loan during the season
15	DF	(England) Craig Dawson	2	0	0	1	0	0	0	0	0	0	0	0	3	0	0
32	MF	(Republic of Ireland) Conor Coventry	0	0	0	0	0	0	0	0	0	1	0	0	1	0	0
Totals			43	0	0	3	0	0	0	0	0	30	0	0	76	0	0

=== Clean sheets ===
The list is sorted by shirt number when total clean sheets are equal.

Rank	No.	Nat	Player	Premier League	FA Cup	EFL Cup	UECL	Total
1	1	(Poland)	Łukasz Fabiański	9	1	0	0	10
2	13	(France)	Alphonse Areola	1	1	0	7	9
Totals				10	2	0	7	19
