= Buckswood School =

Coordinates: 50.902°N 0.630°E

Location
- Broomham Hall, Rye Road; Guestling, near Hastings, East Sussex; England

Information
- Type: Private
- Motto: Ad Vitam Paramus (We Prepare for Life)
- Established: 1933
- Founder: Michael Reiser
- Co-Principals: Kevin Samson & Michael Shaw
- Staff: 150+
- Gender: Coeducational
- Age: 10 to 19
- Enrolment: 470
- Colours: Navy, maroon and gold
- Publication: Buckswood Newsletter
- Proprietor: Giles Sutton
- Group: Buckswood Education Group
- Website: http://www.buckswood.co.uk/

Buckswood School is a private school for boys and girls that was founded in 1933.

Originally the school was situated in Uckfield and known as Buckswood Grange School. In 2000, it re-located to the village of Guestling between the towns of Rye and Hastings in East Sussex.

== Overview ==
Buckswood School currently boards 70 students from 48 different countries, plus 200 local day pupils. In 2018, fees were 13,500 pounds sterling per annum for day pupils and 29,100 pounds sterling per annum for boarders. Bursaries and scholarships are available to provide between a 5% and 35% discount for UK pupils.

Facilities offered on campus include an indoor swimming pool, a specialist football academy, riding stables, a rugby academy, a basketball court, tennis courts and a performing arts centre.

Academically Buckswood offers GCSE, IB diploma and A Level programmes plus full EFL tuition for all overseas students. Buckswood School also offers University Foundation Courses.
