= Michail Antonio =

Footballer (born 1990)

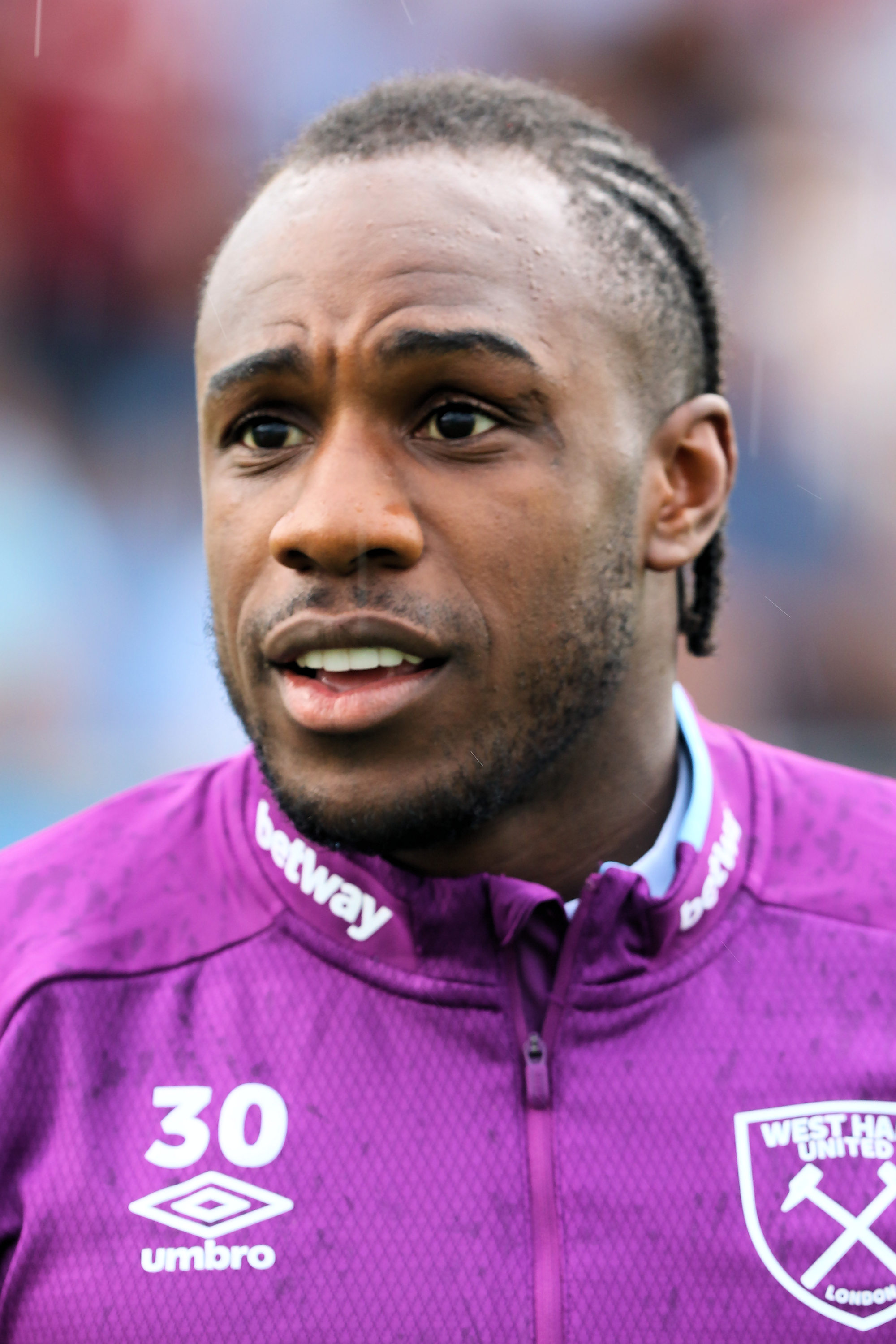
- Antonio with West Ham United in 2019

Personal information
- Full name: Michail Gregory Antonio
- Date of birth: 28 March 1990 (age 36)
- Place of birth: Wandsworth, England
- Height: 5 ft 11 in (1.80 m)
- Position: Forward

Team information
- Current team: Watford
- Number: 18

Youth career
- 2002–2008: Tooting & Mitcham United

Senior career*
| Years | Team | Apps | (Gls) |
| 2008 | Tooting & Mitcham United | 4 | (4) |
| 2008–2012 | Reading | 28 | (1) |
| 2009 | → Tooting & Mitcham United (loan) | 5 | (3) |
| 2009 | → Cheltenham Town (loan) | 9 | (0) |
| 2009–2010 | → Southampton (loan) | 28 | (3) |
| 2011 | → Colchester United (loan) | 15 | (4) |
| 2012 | → Sheffield Wednesday (loan) | 14 | (5) |
| 2012–2014 | Sheffield Wednesday | 64 | (12) |
| 2014–2015 | Nottingham Forest | 50 | (16) |
| 2015–2025 | West Ham United | 268 | (68) |
| 2026 | Al-Sailiya | 4 | (0) |
| 2026– | Watford | 0 | (0) |

International career^{‡}
| 2021– | Jamaica | 24 | (5) |
- * Club domestic league appearances and goals as of 18:12, 13 May 2026 (UTC) ‡ National team caps and goals as of 03:40, 25 June 2025 (UTC)

Michail Gregory Antonio (born 28 March 1990) is a current professional footballer who plays as a forward for the EFL Championship club Watford and for the Jamaica national team.

Antonio began his career at the non-League club Tooting & Mitcham United before signing with Reading of the EFL Championship in 2008. The club sent him on subsequent loan spells to Cheltenham Town, back to Tooting & Mitcham, Southampton and Colchester United, as he struggled to find a place in Reading's first team throughout his four-year stay at the Madejski. A final loan spell with Sheffield Wednesday resulted in a permanent move in 2012, where he went on to make 64 appearances and score 12 goals. Nottingham Forest signed him from Wednesday in 2014, and he scored 16 goals in 50 appearances for the club.

In 2015, Antonio signed for West Ham United of the Premier League, where he was deployed in a number of positions including right back, right midfielder and as a winger before eventually establishing himself as the club's main striker. He spent a decade at the club, becoming their top scorer in the Premier League in 2021, and winning the UEFA Conference League in 2022–23. He suffered injuries in a car crash in December 2024 and was released by West Ham six months later at the end of his contract. After training at other English clubs, he signed for Al-Sailiya in Qatar in March 2026.

Antonio was called up for England in 2016 and 2017, but did not play. He made his debut for Jamaica in 2021 and was part of their squads at the 2023 CONCACAF Gold Cup, the 2024 Copa América and the 2025 Gold Cup, reaching the semi-finals of the former.

== Club career ==
=== Early career ===
Antonio was born in Wandsworth, Greater London. He began playing football as a youth at Tooting & Mitcham United Juniors at the age of 12 and remained there for six seasons. He was scouted and invited for a trial by Tottenham Hotspur at the age of 14, though, his mother rejected the opportunity on his behalf and he remained with Tooting and Mitcham; he would also later unsuccessfully trial with both Brentford and Queens Park Rangers as a teenager. The Juniors' team was independent from Tooting & Mitcham United, whom he later signed for at the age of 17 years. He made his debut for the club in an away match against Wealdstone at the age of 18, scoring once in a 3–0 victory.

=== Reading ===
After just a handful of first-team appearances for Tooting & Mitcham United, Antonio signed for Championship club Reading on 28 October 2008 for an undisclosed fee, signing a deal until 2010. He rejoined Tooting on a month-long loan spell on 9 January 2009, with the loan extended for a further month on 11 February but he returned to Reading less than a week later on 17 February after being recalled by the club.

Following his loan spell with Southampton in the summer of 2010, Antonio signed a fresh deal to keep him at Reading until 2013. He featured more regularly in the squad during the 2010–11 season, scoring one goal, against Burnley, in 24 appearances in all competitions.

==== Cheltenham Town (loan) ====
After being recalled from Tooting, Antonio was subsequently loaned out to League One club Cheltenham Town on a month's loan, commencing on 19 February.

He made his Football League debut in a 2–0 defeat to Leeds United on 21 February, being substituted on 28 minutes after suffering from an ankle injury. After spending some time out injured, Antonio would go on to make eight further appearances until the end of the season with Cheltenham.

==== Southampton (loan) ====
Southampton signed Antonio on loan for one month on 5 October 2009, making his debut on 9 October in a 3–1 away win at Southend United. He scored his first goal for Southampton in the FA Cup victory over Bristol Rovers on 6 November. The loan was subsequently extended until the end of the season.

He scored in the first leg of the Football League Trophy area final against Milton Keynes Dons, with the match finishing 1–0. He also scored in his next appearance, a 2–1 victory over Ipswich Town in the FA Cup. He scored again in the 4–1 2010 Football League Trophy Final win over Carlisle United at Wembley Stadium on 28 March 2010, which was his 20th birthday, bringing Antonio his first silverware.

Antonio's loan deal finished at the end of the 2009–10 season, but both manager Alan Pardew and Antonio himself expressed a desire for the winger to remain at Southampton.

==== Colchester United (loan) ====
Colchester United was the next destination for Antonio, where he signed on a one-month loan on 15 August 2011. He made his debut for the club the following day in a 2–0 home defeat to Charlton Athletic. He scored his first goal for the club to put the U's 2–1 ahead as they eventually lost in a 3–2 defeat to Huddersfield Town on 20 August. His loan spell with the club was extended for another month in September and then for a further month in October. In total, Antonio scored four goals in 15 league outings for Colchester.

=== Sheffield Wednesday ===
On 21 February 2012, Sheffield Wednesday signed Antonio on an emergency loan deal until the end of the season. His debut for the Owls came in a 1–0 victory over local rivals, Sheffield United on 26 February. In his next appearance, a 4–1 win against Bury, he scored two and set up another for forward Ryan Lowe. In the following match, against Bournemouth, Antonio set up the opener and scored Wednesday's third in the opening ten minutes. On 21 April 2012, against Carlisle United at Hillsborough, he scored a 95th-minute winner to beat them and put Sheffield Wednesday only one point behind local rivals United, who were in second place. He helped the Owls to promotion on the final day of the season by scoring the first in a 2–0 victory over already relegated Wycombe Wanderers, which led Wednesday to finish above Steel City rivals Sheffield United.

Antonio signed on a permanent basis for Sheffield Wednesday on 6 August 2012 on a four-year deal after a third and final bid for the player was accepted by Reading. In his first season with the club, Antonio had been leading the scoring charts with nine goals, but an injury suffered in a 2–0 defeat by Cardiff City on 16 March 2013 ruled him out for the rest of the season.

=== Nottingham Forest ===
On 6 August 2014, Antonio signed a three-year contract with Nottingham Forest for a transfer fee in the region of £1.5 million.

Antonio's strong form in Forest's first five league matches of the season, in which he contributed three goals and three assists, led to him being named as a candidate for the Championship Player of the Month award for August. Antonio lost out on the award to Charlton Athletic's Igor Vetokele. Antonio started every league match for Forest during his first season with the club, scoring 14 goals, and was named Forest's Player of the Season on 4 May 2015.

On 11 August 2015, Antonio scored a brace in a 3–4 loss to League One club Walsall in the first round of the League Cup. On 15 August, the winger scored the winner in a 2–1 victory at home to Rotherham to open his tally for the new season.

Having already rejected a bid of £4 million from West Bromwich Albion for the transfer of Antonio earlier that summer, Forest received a second bid of £4 million from arch-rivals Derby County. Consequently, Antonio was left out of Forest's Championship match against Charlton Athletic on 19 August 2015, with his manager Dougie Freedman citing that the winger was not "in the right frame of mind" to play. However, Antonio returned for the next league match at Bolton Wanderers. On 26 August, West Ham United joined the bidding for Antonio, offering Forest £4 million and winger Matt Jarvis on a season-long loan.

=== West Ham United ===
==== 2015–2017 ====
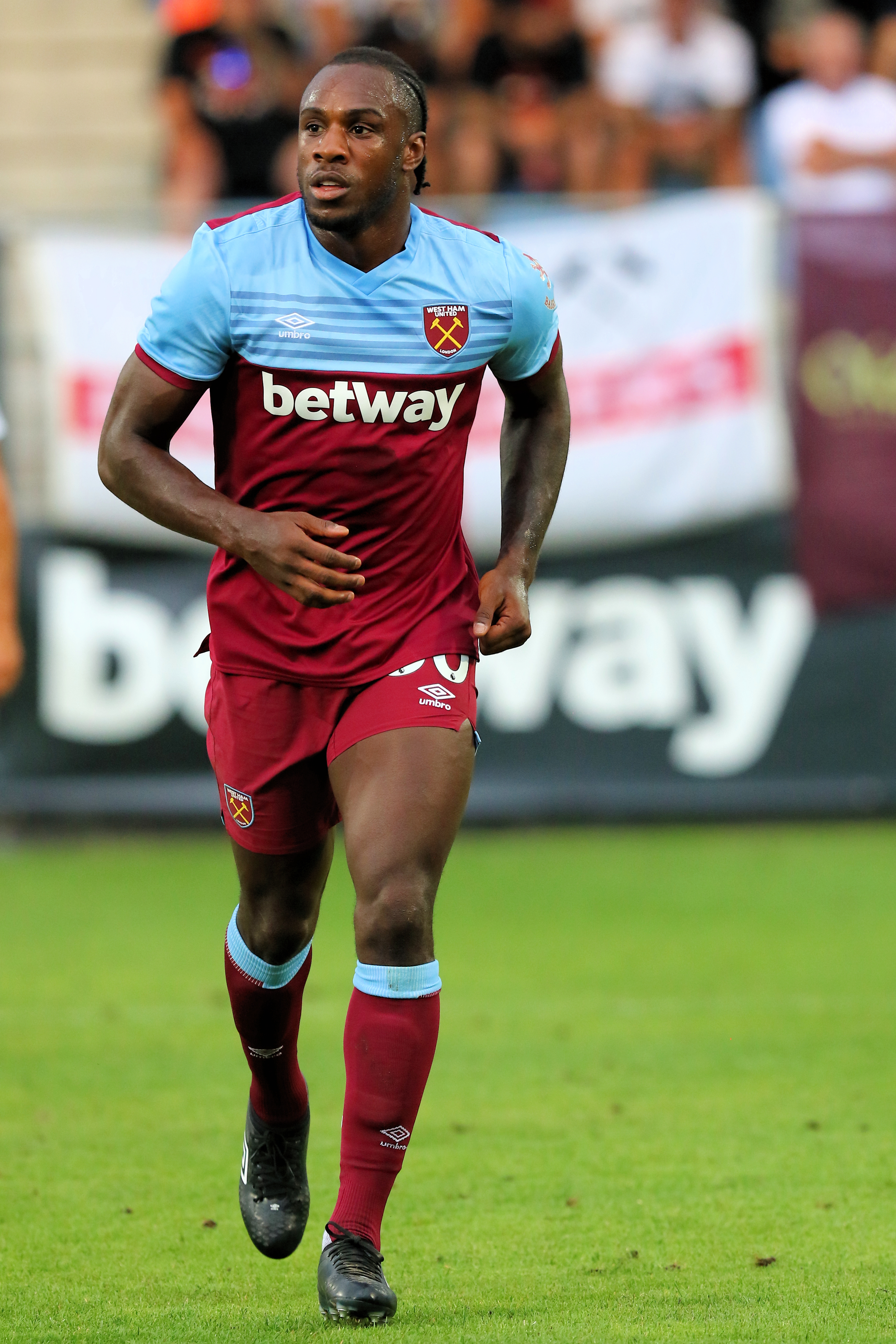
Antonio playing for West Ham United in 2019

On 1 September 2015, Antonio signed for Premier League club West Ham United for around £7 million on a four-year contract with an option for a further two years. He made his debut on 19 September, replacing Victor Moses in the 60th minute of West Ham's 2–1 Premier League win at Manchester City. In a Man of the match performance on 28 December 2015 in a 2–1 win, Antonio scored his first goal for West Ham. With the team losing 1–0 to Southampton, Antonio equalised when a clearance hit him and looped over Southampton goalkeeper, Maarten Stekelenburg.

On 27 February, Antonio scored the only goal in a home win over Sunderland. He celebrated by lying on his side and spinning in a circle, imitating a celebration by The Simpsons character Homer Simpson in the episode "Last Exit to Springfield". In his next appearance, Antonio turned-in a Man of the match performance, scoring the only goal in a home win against London rivals Tottenham Hotspur. He followed this with another goal in a 3–2 away win at Everton three days later as West Ham came from two goals down. In July 2016, Antonio signed a new, four-year contract with West Ham.

Antonio started West Ham's first match of the 2016–17 season in the right-back position, subsequently giving away a penalty in the early stages of the second half, which was converted by Eden Hazard, to give Chelsea a 1–0 lead. He was substituted not long after for Sam Byram. Chelsea went on to win 2–1. In the second match of the season, on 21 August 2016, Antonio returned to his favourite position of winger. He scored the only goal of the match, from a cross by Gökhan Töre, in a 1–0 win against Bournemouth; West Ham's first Premier League match and goal at their new ground, the London Stadium. In April 2017, having scored nine goals for West Ham, Antonio was ruled out for the remainder of the season with what was described by manager, Slaven Bilić, as a "significant injury". For his performances during the 2016–17 season, Antonio was named Hammer of the Year. On 11 May 2017, West Ham announced that Antonio had signed a new, four-year contract.

==== 2017–2021 ====
Antonio scored the first goal by a visiting player at the new Tottenham Hotspur Stadium, on 27 April 2019, as West Ham won 1–0, becoming the first away team to win at the stadium.

On 11 July 2020, Antonio scored all four goals in a 4–0 win for West Ham over Norwich City, becoming the first player in West Ham's history to score four goals in a single Premier League game and the first West Ham player to score four goals in a game since David Cross against Tottenham in September 1981.

On 22 July 2020, Antonio scored his 10th Premier League goal of the season, his best return in the top division of English football, in West Ham's 1–1 draw with Manchester United at Old Trafford. The result also secured West Ham's place in the Premier League for the following season. In December 2020, Antonio signed a new, three-year contract committing himself to the club until 2023.

Antonio finished the 2020–21 season as West Ham's joint top-scorer, alongside Tomáš Souček, with ten goals.

==== 2021–22 season ====
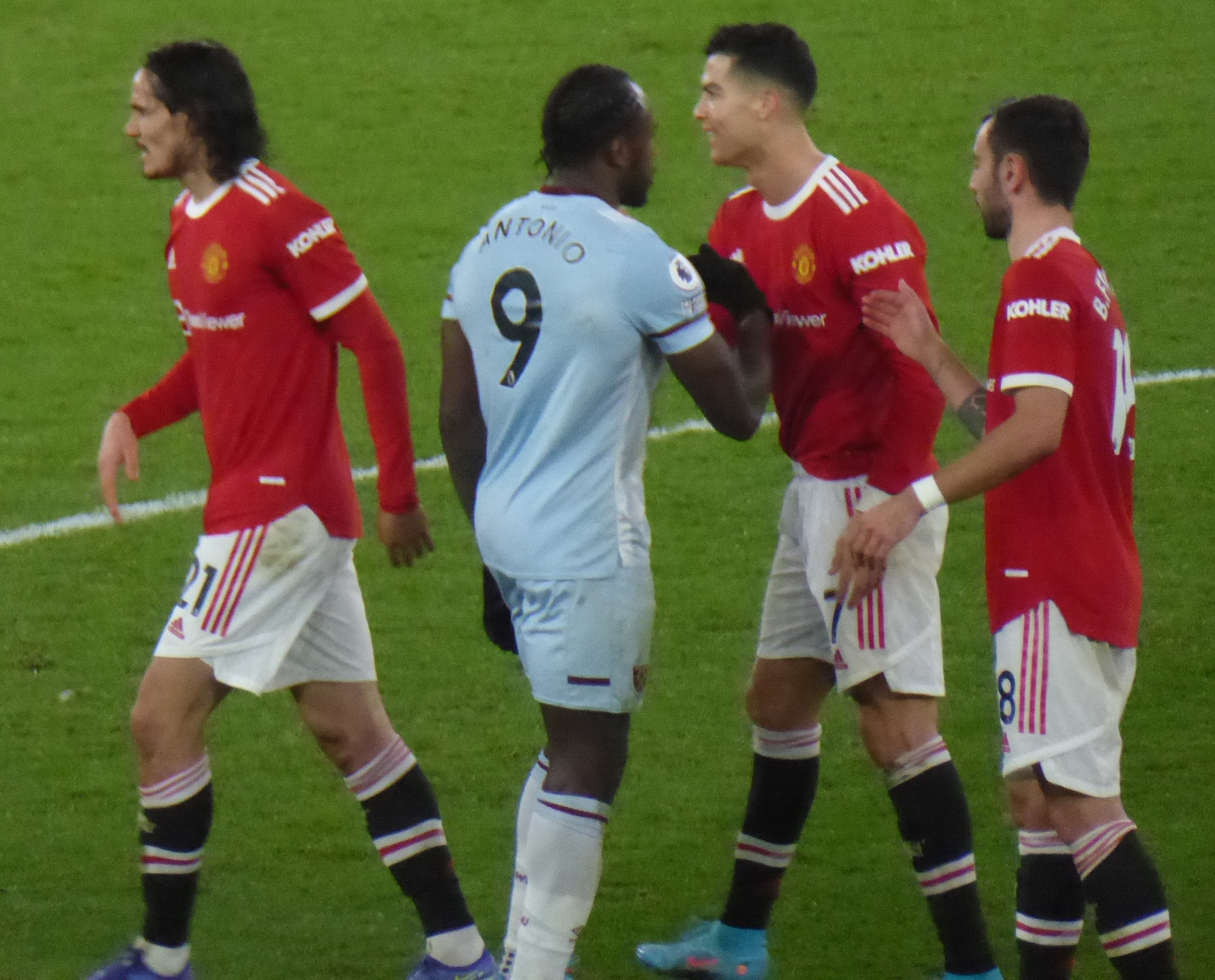
Antonio (in blue) playing against Manchester United in January 2022

On 15 August 2021, Antonio scored his 47th Premier League goal for the club, in a 4–2 victory away to Newcastle United, in West Ham United's opening match of the 2021–22 season. The goal drew him level with the club's all-time record top scorer in the Premier League era, Paolo Di Canio. On 23 August, he scored a brace in West Ham's 4–1 home win against Leicester City to eclipse Di Canio's record. His goal celebration involved him running to the substitutes' bench and hoisting a cardboard cut-out of himself above his head, drawing inspiration from actors Patrick Swayze and Jennifer Grey in the musical film Dirty Dancing.

On 10 September 2021, he was named as Premier League Player of the Month for August 2021. Antonio scored West Ham's first goal in a 2–0 win against Dinamo Zagreb, on 16 September in their opening game in the 2021–22 UEFA Europa League group stage. It was West Ham's first goal in major European competition since 1999. On 25 September 2021, Antonio was subjected to racist abuse by a Leeds United supporter during a game a Elland Road. The offender was banned from attending any football match for four years after he was convicted of two offences at a trial at Leeds Magistrates' Court and given an eight-week prison sentence, suspended for 12 months.

On 7 January 2022, Antonio signed a new two-and-a-half-year deal with West Ham, with the option to extend a further year.

==== 2022–2023 ====
On 7 June 2023, Antonio played in the 2023 UEFA Europa Conference League final, against Fiorentina in Prague. West Ham won their first trophy in 43 years with a 2–1 victory. He scored seven goals on the way to the final, including both goals away to AEK Larnaca of Cyprus in the last-16 first leg, another brace in a 4–1 home win over Gent in the quarter-finals, and the winning goal in the first leg of the semi-final against AZ Alkmaar of the Netherlands.

On 20 August 2023, after stories linking him with a summer move away from the club, Antonio scored his first goal of the season in a 3–1 win over London rivals Chelsea.

=== Rehabilitation ===
On 30 June 2025, Antonio left West Ham first team when his contract expired. In August 2025, he continued his rehabilitation with the support of West Ham following a road traffic accident in December 2024. He began training and later played for West Ham U21 in the league opening match on 18 August against Nottingham Forest U21.

In December 2025, Antonio began training with EFL Championship club Leicester City as a free agent, with the club considering offering him a short-term contract. Antonio was also offered a contract by Brentford after training with them, but this move fell through due to a torn calf.

=== Al-Sailiya ===
Antonio's international teammate for Jamaica, Mason Holgate of Qatar Stars League club Al-Sailiya, had been asked by manager Mirghani Al Zain if he knew of a forward who could arrive for free to cover an injury. He recommended Antonio, who signed a two-month deal for the rest of the season on 2 March 2026. He signed his deal days after Iranian missiles hit Qatar and other Arab states.

=== Watford ===
On 11 September 2026, Antonio signed for EFL Championship club Watford on a one-year deal.

== International career ==
In March 2016, Antonio revealed that he had rejected the opportunity to play for Jamaica internationally and that he harboured an ambition of playing for England.

On 28 August 2016, in new England manager Sam Allardyce's first squad, Antonio was called up for the first time, for a 2018 World Cup qualification match away to Slovakia; he was an unused substitute in the game on 4 September. On 16 March 2017, Antonio was called up by new England manager Gareth Southgate's squad for the friendly match against Germany and the 2018 World Cup qualifier against Lithuania that month; however, Antonio withdrew from the squad after picking up a hamstring injury.

In February 2021, Antonio was again approached by Jamaica to consider playing for them at international level. He was said to be passionate about playing and helping them reach the 2022 World Cup. The following month, he was reported to be in the process of obtaining his Jamaican passport. Later in March, it was reported that Antonio had decided he was going to represent Jamaica internationally, ahead of the squad being announced for an upcoming international friendly against the United States. Despite this, Antonio was not included in the 19-man squad when this was announced. The BBC reported that Antonio was still to decide whether to switch, while Talksport reported on the same day that he had pledged to play for Jamaica.

On 18 June 2021, Antonio was named in Jamaica's 60-man provisional squad for the 2021 CONCACAF Gold Cup. He missed out on the final 23-man squad, by virtue of not having secured his passport in time. In August 2021, The Athletic reported Antonio had received his passport, making him eligible to play for the country. He was subsequently called up for a 35-man squad for World Cup qualifiers against Mexico, Panama and Costa Rica although COVID-19 travel restrictions did not allow him to enter either Mexico or Costa Rica. He debuted in a 3–0 loss to Panama on 5 September. His debut lasted 70 minutes. He spent much of the game isolated with little service from his team on what was described as a hard and dry pitch. He scored his first goal for Jamaica in his second international appearance; in a World Cup qualifier against El Salvador on 13 November, he scored the opening goal in a 1–1 draw.

Antonio was part of the Jamaica squad that reached the semi-finals of the 2023 CONCACAF Gold Cup in the United States. On 26 June 2024, he scored Jamaica's first ever goal in a Copa América tournament, in a 3–1 defeat by Ecuador at the Allegiant Stadium, Paradise, Nevada in the 2024 Copa América.

In June 2025, six months after his car crash, Antonio was called up for the 2025 CONCACAF Gold Cup in the United States. He made his first competitive appearances since the accident, coming on as a late substitute in all three games of a group-stage elimination.

== Style of play ==
Antonio is a player who has been touted for his versatility throughout his time at West Ham. Antonio has played as a right back, right midfielder, winger and striker during his years at the club. Antonio said in 2016 however that his preferred position was on the wing.

== Personal life ==
Antonio is divorced and has six children.

In February 2019, Antonio suggested that clubs whose fans engage in racial abuse should be deducted points.

On 7 December 2024, Antonio was reported by his club, West Ham, to have been involved in a road traffic accident after crashing his Ferrari in Epping, with the nature of the accident and details of his condition "to be issued in due course". He was later confirmed to be in a stable condition at a central London hospital. On 8 December it was confirmed that he had undergone surgery on a lower limb fracture. He was discharged from hospital at the end of December with his injuries expected to keep him out of football for at least a year. He returned to playing on 17 June 2025 when he came on as an 85th-minute substitute for Jamaica in a 2025 CONCACAF Gold Cup game against Guatemala.

=== Media ===
In August 2025, Antonio was announced as a pundit for TNT Sports for the 2025–26 season.

== Career statistics ==
=== Club ===
As of match played 27 April 2026

Appearances and goals by club, season and competition
| Club | Season | League | | | National cup (Note: Includes FA Cup) | | League cup (Note: Includes EFL Cup) | | Continental | | Other | | Total | |
| Club | Season | Division | Apps | Goals | Apps | Goals | Apps | Goals | Apps | Goals | Apps | Goals | Apps | Goals |
|---|---|---|---|---|---|---|---|---|---|---|---|---|---|---|
| Tooting & Mitcham United | 2008–09 (Note: Part of this season was spent on loan from Reading) | Isthmian League Premier Division | 9 | 7 | 0 | 0 | — | | — | | 3 (Note: One appearance in FA Trophy, one appearance in Isthmian League Cup, one appearance and three goals in London Senior Cup) | 3 | 12 | 10 |
| Reading | 2008–09 | Championship | 0 | 0 | 0 | 0 | — | | — | | 0 | 0 | 0 | 0 |
| Reading | 2009–10 | Championship | 1 | 0 | — | | 1 | 0 | — | | — | | 2 | 0 |
| Reading | 2010–11 | Championship | 21 | 1 | 1 | 0 | 2 | 0 | — | | 0 | 0 | 24 | 1 |
| Reading | 2011–12 | Championship | 6 | 0 | 1 | 0 | — | | — | | — | | 7 | 0 |
| Reading | Total | | 28 | 1 | 2 | 0 | 3 | 0 | — | | 0 | 0 | 33 | 1 |
| Cheltenham Town (loan) | 2008–09 | League One | 9 | 0 | — | | — | | — | | — | | 9 | 0 |
| Southampton (loan) | 2009–10 | League One | 28 | 3 | 5 | 2 | — | | — | | 6 (Note: Appearance(s) in Football League Trophy) | 2 | 39 | 7 |
| Colchester United (loan) | 2011–12 | League One | 15 | 4 | — | | — | | — | | 1 | 0 | 16 | 4 |
| Sheffield Wednesday (loan) | 2011–12 | League One | 14 | 5 | — | | — | | — | | — | | 14 | 5 |
| Sheffield Wednesday | 2012–13 | Championship | 37 | 8 | 2 | 0 | 3 | 1 | — | | — | | 42 | 9 |
| Sheffield Wednesday | 2013–14 | Championship | 27 | 4 | 0 | 0 | 1 | 0 | — | | — | | 28 | 4 |
| Sheffield Wednesday | Total | | 78 | 17 | 2 | 0 | 4 | 1 | — | | — | | 84 | 18 |
| Nottingham Forest | 2014–15 | Championship | 46 | 14 | 1 | 0 | 2 | 1 | — | | — | | 49 | 15 |
| Nottingham Forest | 2015–16 | Championship | 4 | 2 | — | | 1 | 2 | — | | — | | 5 | 4 |
| Nottingham Forest | Total | | 50 | 16 | 1 | 0 | 3 | 3 | — | | — | | 54 | 19 |
| West Ham United | 2015–16 | Premier League | 26 | 8 | 6 | 1 | — | | — | | — | | 32 | 9 |
| West Ham United | 2016–17 | Premier League | 29 | 9 | 1 | 0 | 3 | 0 | 4 (Note: Appearances in UEFA Europa League) | 0 | — | | 37 | 9 |
| West Ham United | 2017–18 | Premier League | 21 | 3 | 0 | 0 | 0 | 0 | — | | — | | 21 | 3 |
| West Ham United | 2018–19 | Premier League | 33 | 6 | 2 | 0 | 3 | 1 | — | | — | | 38 | 7 |
| West Ham United | 2019–20 | Premier League | 24 | 10 | 1 | 0 | 1 | 0 | — | | — | | 26 | 10 |
| West Ham United | 2020–21 | Premier League | 26 | 10 | 1 | 0 | 0 | 0 | — | | — | | 27 | 10 |
| West Ham United | 2021–22 | Premier League | 36 | 10 | 2 | 1 | 0 | 0 | 9 | 2 | — | | 47 | 13 |
| West Ham United | 2022–23 | Premier League | 33 | 5 | 3 | 1 | 1 | 1 | 11 (Note: Appearances in UEFA Europa Conference League) | 7 | — | | 48 | 14 |
| West Ham United | 2023–24 | Premier League | 26 | 6 | 0 | 0 | 0 | 0 | 6 | 1 | — | | 32 | 7 |
| West Ham United | 2024–25 | Premier League | 14 | 1 | 0 | 0 | 1 | 0 | — | | — | | 15 | 1 |
| West Ham United | Total | | 268 | 68 | 16 | 3 | 9 | 2 | 30 | 10 | — | | 323 | 83 |
| Al-Sailiya | 2025–26 | Qatar Stars League | 4 | 0 | 0 | 0 | 0 | 0 | — | | 0 | 0 | 4 | 0 |
| Watford | 2026–27 | Championship | 0 | 0 | 0 | 0 | — | | — | | 0 | 0 | 0 | 0 |
| Career total | | | 489 | 116 | 26 | 5 | 19 | 7 | 30 | 10 | 10 | 5 | 574 | 143 |

=== International ===
As of match played 24 June 2025

Appearances and goals by national team and year
| National team | Year | Apps | Goals |
|---|---|---|---|
| Jamaica | 2021 | 3 | 2 |
| Jamaica | 2022 | 4 | 1 |
| Jamaica | 2023 | 7 | 0 |
| Jamaica | 2024 | 7 | 2 |
| Jamaica | 2025 | 3 | 0 |
| Total | | 24 | 5 |

Scores and results list Jamaica's goal tally first, score column indicates score after each Antonio goal

List of international goals scored by Michail Antonio
| No. | Date | Venue | Opponent | Score | Result | Competition |
|---|---|---|---|---|---|---|
| 1 | 12 November 2021 | Estadio Cuscatlán, San Salvador, El Salvador | El Salvador | 1–0 | 1–1 | 2022 FIFA World Cup qualification |
| 2 | 16 November 2021 | Independence Park, Kingston, Jamaica | United States | 1–1 | 1–1 | 2022 FIFA World Cup qualification |
| 3 | 30 January 2022 | Estadio Rommel Fernández, Panama City, Panama | Panama | 1–0 | 2–3 | 2022 FIFA World Cup qualification |
| 4 | 26 June 2024 | Allegiant Stadium, Las Vegas, United States | Ecuador | 1–2 | 1–3 | 2024 Copa América |
| 5 | 10 September 2024 | Estadio Nacional Chelato Uclés, Tegucigalpa, Honduras | Honduras | 2–1 | 2–1 | 2024–25 CONCACAF Nations League A |

== Honours ==
Southampton

- Football League Trophy: 2009–10

Sheffield Wednesday

- Football League One runner-up: 2011–12

West Ham United

- UEFA Europa Conference League: 2022–23

Individual

- Nottingham Forest Player of the Year: 2014–15
- West Ham United Hammer of the Year: 2016–17
- Premier League Player of the Month: July 2020, August 2021
- UEFA Europa Conference League Team of the Season: 2022–23
