= 2018–19 West Ham United F.C. season =

English football team season

West Ham United
2018–19 season
- Co-chairmen: David Gold; David Sullivan
- Manager: Manuel Pellegrini
- Stadium: London Stadium
- Premier League: 10th
- FA Cup: Fourth round
- EFL Cup: Fourth round
- Top goalscorer: League: Marko Arnautović (10); All: Marko Arnautović (11)
- Highest home attendance: League/All: 59,988 vs Everton (30 March 2019)
- Lowest home attendance: League: 56,811 vs Cardiff City (4 December 2018); All: 24,833 vs Macclesfield Town (26 September 2018, EFL Cup R3)
- Average home league attendance: 58,336
- Biggest win: 8–0 vs Macclesfield Town (26 September 2018, EFL Cup R3)
- Biggest defeat: 0–4 vs Liverpool (12 August 2018, PL round 1)
Home colours	Away colours	Third colours

The 2018–19 season was West Ham United's seventh consecutive campaign in the Premier League since being promoted in the 2011–12 season. It was West Ham's 23rd Premier League campaign overall and their 61st top flight appearance in their 124th year in existence.

Aside of the Premier League, West Ham United participated in the FA Cup and League Cup, entering at the third round in the FA Cup and the second round in the EFL Cup.

== First team ==
Squad No.	Name	Nationality	Position (s)	Date of birth (age)	Signed from
Goalkeepers
1	Łukasz Fabiański	(Poland)	GK	18 April 1985 (aged 33)	(Wales) Swansea City
13	Adrián	(Spain)	GK	3 January 1987 (aged 31)	(Spain) Real Betis
Defenders
2	Winston Reid	(New Zealand)	CB	3 July 1988 (aged 30)	(Denmark) Midtjylland
3	Aaron Cresswell	(England)	LB	15 December 1989 (aged 28)	(England) Ipswich Town
4	Fabián Balbuena	(Paraguay)	CB	23 August 1991 (aged 27)	(Brazil) Corinthians
5	Pablo Zabaleta	(Argentina)	RB	16 January 1985 (aged 33)	(England) Manchester City
21	Angelo Ogbonna	(Italy)	CB	23 May 1988 (aged 30)	(Italy) Juventus
23	Issa Diop	(France)	CB	9 January 1997 (aged 21)	(France) Toulouse
24	Ryan Fredericks	(England)	RB/RM	10 October 1992 (aged 25)	(England) Fulham
26	Arthur Masuaku	(Democratic Republic of the Congo)	LB	7 November 1993 (aged 24)	(Greece) Olympiacos
53	Ben Johnson	(England)	LB/RB	24 January 2000 (aged 18)	Academy
Midfielders
10	Manuel Lanzini	(Argentina)	AM	15 February 1993 (aged 25)	(United Arab Emirates) Al Jazira
11	Robert Snodgrass	(Scotland)	RM	7 September 1987 (aged 30)	(England) Hull City
14	Pedro Obiang	(Equatorial Guinea)	CM/DM	27 March 1992 (aged 26)	(Italy) Sampdoria
15	Carlos Sánchez	(Colombia)	DM	6 February 1986 (aged 32)	(Italy) Fiorentina
16	Mark Noble (captain)	(England)	CM	8 May 1987 (aged 31)	Academy
18	Samir Nasri	(France)	AM/LW	26 June 1987 (aged 31)	Free Agent
19	Jack Wilshere	(England)	CM/AM	1 January 1992 (aged 26)	(England) Arsenal
41	Declan Rice	(England)	DM	14 January 1999 (aged 19)	Academy
45	Grady Diangana	(England)	CM/AM	19 April 1998 (aged 20)	Academy
Forwards
7	Marko Arnautović	(Austria)	LW/RW/ST	19 April 1989 (aged 29)	(England) Stoke City
8	Felipe Anderson	(Brazil)	RW/LW/AM	15 April 1993 (aged 25)	(Italy) Lazio
9	Andy Carroll	(England)	ST	6 January 1989 (aged 29)	(England) Liverpool
17	Javier Hernández	(Mexico)	ST	1 June 1988 (aged 30)	(Germany) Bayer Leverkusen
20	Andriy Yarmolenko	(Ukraine)	RW/LW	23 October 1989 (aged 28)	(Germany) Borussia Dortmund
27	Lucas Pérez	(Spain)	ST/RW	10 September 1988 (aged 29)	(England) Arsenal
30	Michail Antonio	(England)	RW/LW/RWB	28 March 1990 (aged 28)	(England) Nottingham Forest
32	Xande Silva	(Portugal)	ST	16 March 1997 (aged 21)	(Portugal) Vitória Guimarães

== Competitions ==
=== Friendlies ===
The club arranged an 11-day pre-season trip to Switzerland, where they played Challenge League side Winterthur. They followed this with a number of other friendlies against English clubs, before travelling to Austria for two games, including the season's Betway Cup fixture, against Mainz 05. In November 2018, the club arranged a friendly against Brentford to coincide with that month's international break.

8 July 2018 Friendly	FC Winterthur	3–2	West Ham United	Winterthur, Switzerland
14:00 BST	Callà 25'; Sutter 39'; Gele 74'	Report	Carroll 33'; Noble 84' (pen.)	Stadium: Stadion Schützenwiese

14 July 2018 Friendly	Wycombe Wanderers	0–1	West Ham United	High Wycombe
15:00 BST		Report	Arnautović 34'	Stadium: Adams Park

21 July 2018 Friendly	Preston North End	2–2	West Ham United	Preston
15:00 BST	Clarke 40'; Bodin 76'	Report	Arnautović 6', 45'	Stadium: Deepdale

25 July 2018 Friendly	Aston Villa	1–3	West Ham United	Walsall
19:45 BST	Green 86'	Report	Antonio 10'; Arnautović 28'; Snodgrass 84'	Stadium: Bescot Stadium

28 July 2018 Friendly	Ipswich Town	1–2	West Ham United	Ipswich
15:00 BST	Harrison 16'	Report	Anderson 4'; Arnautović 70'	Stadium: Portman Road; Attendance: 15,246; Referee: John Brooks

31 July 2018 Betway Cup	Mainz 05	1–1 (6–7 p)	West Ham United	Schwaz, Austria
17:30 BST	Quaison 79'	Report	Martínez 69'	Stadium: Silberstadt Arena

3 August 2018 Friendly	Angers	0–1	West Ham United	Grödig, Austria
17:30 BST		Report	Hernández 24'	Stadium: Das.Goldberg-Stadion

15 November 2018 Friendly	Brentford	1–2	West Ham United	Brentford
	Emiliano	Report	Snodgrass 43'; Hernández	Stadium: Griffin Park

=== Premier League ===
==== League table ====
Pos	Team	Pld	W	D	L	GF	GA	GD	Pts
8	Everton	38	15	9	14	54	46	+8	54
9	Leicester City	38	15	7	16	51	48	+3	52
10	West Ham United	38	15	7	16	52	55	−3	52
11	Watford	38	14	8	16	52	59	−7	50
12	Crystal Palace	38	14	7	17	51	53	−2	49

Source: Premier League
Rules for classification: 1) Points; 2) Goal difference; 3) Goals scored; 4) Play-offs (only if needed to decide champion, teams for relegation or teams for UEFA competitions).

==== Results summary ====
Overall								Home						Away					
Pld	W	D	L	GF	GA	GD	Pts	W	D	L	GF	GA	GD	W	D	L	GF	GA	GD
38	15	7	16	52	55	−3	52	9	4	6	32	27	+5	6	3	10	20	28	−8

Last updated: 12 May 2019.
Source: Premier League

==== Results by matchday ====
Round	1	2	3	4	5	6	7	8	9	10	11	12	13	14	15	16	17	18	19	20	21	22	23	24	25	26	27	28	29	30	31	32	33	34	35	36	37	38
Ground	A	H	A	H	A	H	H	A	H	A	H	A	H	A	H	H	A	H	A	A	H	H	A	A	H	A	H	A	H	A	H	H	A	A	H	A	H	A
Result	L	L	L	L	W	D	W	L	L	D	W	D	L	W	W	W	W	L	W	L	D	W	L	L	D	D	W	L	W	L	W	L	L	L	D	W	W	W
Position	20	20	20	20	16	17	13	15	15	13	13	13	13	13	12	10	9	12	9	11	10	9	10	11	12	10	9	10	9	9	9	11	11	11	11	11	11	10

Updated to match(es) played on 12 May 2019. Source: Statto.com
A = Away; H = Home; W = Win; D = Draw; L = Loss

==== Matches ====
On 14 June 2018, the Premier League fixtures for the forthcoming season were announced.

12 August 2018 1	Liverpool	4–0	West Ham United	Liverpool
13:30 BST	Salah 19'; Mané 45+2', 53'; Sturridge 88'; Alexander-Arnold (yellow card) 21'	Report	Antonio (yellow card) 52'; Balbuena (yellow card) 55'	Stadium: Anfield; Attendance: 53,235; Referee: Anthony Taylor

18 August 2018 2	West Ham United	1–2	Bournemouth	Stratford, London
15:00 BST	Arnautović 33' (pen.); Noble (yellow card) 40'; Ogbonna (yellow card) 65'; Wilshere (yellow card) 77'; Felipe Anderson (yellow card) 89'; Zabaleta (yellow card) 90+1'; Yarmolenko (yellow card) 90+3'	Report	King (yellow card) 59'; Wilson 60'; Cook 66'	Stadium: London Stadium; Attendance: 56,888; Referee: Stuart Attwell

25 August 2018 3	Arsenal	3–1	West Ham United	Holloway, London
15:00 BST	Monreal 30'; Diop 70' (o.g.); Papastathopoulos (yellow card) 90'; Welbeck 90+2'	Report	Arnautović 25'; Diop (yellow card) 41'; Fredericks (yellow card) 80'; Wilshere (yellow card) 88'	Stadium: Emirates Stadium; Attendance: 59,830; Referee: Graham Scott

1 September 2018 4	West Ham United	0–1	Wolverhampton Wanderers	Stratford, London
15:00 BST	Fredericks (yellow card) 24'; Cresswell (yellow card) 60'	Report	Bennett (yellow card) 79'; Traoré 90+3'	Stadium: London Stadium; Attendance: 56,947; Referee: Chris Kavanagh

16 September 2018 5	Everton	1–3	West Ham United	Walton
16:00 BST	Calvert-Lewin (yellow card) 18'; Sigurðsson 45+2'; Bernard (yellow card) 90+4'	Report	Yarmolenko 11', 31', (yellow card) 51'; Masuaku (yellow card) 40'; Zabaleta (yellow card) 53'; Arnautović 61'; Rice (yellow card) 75'; Snodgrass (yellow card) 90+1'	Stadium: Goodison Park; Attendance: 39,161; Referee: Martin Atkinson

23 September 2018 6	West Ham United	0–0	Chelsea	Stratford, London
13:30 BST	Felipe Anderson (yellow card) 52'; Snodgrass (yellow card) 90+3'	Report	Kanté (yellow card) 50'	Stadium: London Stadium; Attendance: 56,875; Referee: Mike Dean

29 September 2018 7	West Ham United	3–1	Manchester United	Stratford, London
12:30 BST	Felipe Anderson 5'; Lindelöf 43' (o.g.); Arnautović 74'	Report	Rashford 71'; Young (yellow card) 78'	Stadium: London Stadium; Attendance: 56,938; Referee: Michael Oliver

5 October 2018 8	Brighton & Hove Albion	1–0	West Ham United	Falmer
20:00 BST	Murray 25'; Duffy (yellow card) 33'; Jahanbakhsh (yellow card) 58'; Kayal (yellow card) 61'	Report	Arnautović (yellow card) 57'; Snodgrass (yellow card) 88'	Stadium: Falmer Stadium; Attendance: 30,544; Referee: Kevin Friend

20 October 2018 9	West Ham United	0–1	Tottenham Hotspur	Stratford, London
15:00 BST	Noble (yellow card) 59'; Snodgrass (yellow card) 80'; Arnautović (yellow card) 73'	Report	Lamela 44'	Stadium: London Stadium; Attendance: 56,921; Referee: Martin Atkinson

27 October 2018 10	Leicester City	1–1	West Ham United	Leicester
17:30 BST	Söyüncü (yellow card) 47'; Ndidi 89'	Report	Balbuena 30'; Noble (red card) 38'; Zabaleta (yellow card) 85'	Stadium: King Power Stadium; Attendance: 31,848; Referee: Michael Oliver

3 November 2018 11	West Ham United	4–2	Burnley	Stratford, London
15:00 GMT	Arnautović 10'; Felipe Anderson (yellow card) 34', (goal) 68', 84'; Hernández 90+2'	Report	Guðmundsson 45'; Tarkowski (yellow card) 68'; Wood 77'; Lowton (yellow card) 87'; Barnes (yellow card) 90+3'; Brady (yellow card) 90+5'	Stadium: London Stadium; Attendance: 56,862; Referee: Roger East

10 November 2018 12	Huddersfield Town	1–1	West Ham United	Huddersfield
15:00 GMT	Pritchard 6'; Jørgensen (yellow card) 36'	Report	Snodgrass (yellow card) 17'; Felipe Anderson 74'	Stadium: Kirklees Stadium; Attendance: 24,069; Referee: Chris Kavanagh

24 November 2018 13	West Ham United	0–4	Manchester City	Stratford, London
15:00 GMT		Report	D. Silva 11'; Sterling 19'; Sané 34', 90+3'	Stadium: London Stadium; Attendance: 56,886; Referee: Andre Marriner

1 December 2018 14	Newcastle United	0–3	West Ham United	Newcastle upon Tyne
15:00 GMT	Ritchie (yellow card) 41'; Schär (yellow card) 79'; Yedlin (yellow card) 89'	Report	Hernández 11', 63'; Snodgrass (yellow card) 21'; Noble (yellow card) 32'; Zabaleta (yellow card) 43'; Felipe Anderson 90+3'	Stadium: St James' Park; Attendance: 51,853; Referee: Paul Tierney

4 December 2018 15	West Ham United	3–1	Cardiff City	Stratford, London
19:45 GMT	Arnautovic (yellow card) 36'; Pérez 49', 54'; Antonio 61'	Report	Ralls (yellow card) 40'; Bamba (yellow card) 65'; Murphy 90+5'	Stadium: London Stadium; Attendance: 56,811; Referee: Graham Scott

8 December 2018 16	West Ham United	3–2	Crystal Palace	Stratford, London
15:00 GMT	Snodgrass 48'; Hernández 62'; Felipe Anderson 65'	Report	McArthur 6'; Schlupp 76'	Stadium: London Stadium; Attendance: 56,995; Referee: Anthony Taylor

15 December 2018 17	Fulham	0–2	West Ham United	Fulham, London
17:30 GMT	Seri (yellow card) 41'; Johansen (yellow card) 90'	Report	Snodgrass 17'; Antonio 29'; Noble (yellow card) 39'	Stadium: Craven Cottage; Attendance: 24,081; Referee: Mike Dean

22 December 2018 18	West Ham United	0–2	Watford	Stratford, London
15:00 GMT	Balbuena (yellow card) 27'; Antonio (yellow card) 69'; Diop (yellow card) 90+3'	Report	Deeney 30' (pen.); Kabasele (yellow card) 55'; Holebas (yellow card) 60'; Deulofeu 87'	Stadium: London Stadium; Attendance: 56,833; Referee: Lee Mason

27 December 2018 19	Southampton	1–2	West Ham United	Southampton
19:45 GMT	Redmond 50'; Targett (yellow card) 66'; Bednarek (yellow card) 83'	Report	Felipe Anderson 53', 59'	Stadium: St Mary's Stadium; Attendance: 31,654; Referee: Craig Pawson

30 December 2018 20	Burnley	2–0	West Ham United	Burnley
14:15 GMT	Wood 15'; McNeil 34'; Barnes (yellow card) 38'	Report	Snodgrass (yellow card) 23'; Noble (yellow card) 29'; Carroll (yellow card) 57'; Rice (yellow card) 61'	Stadium: Turf Moor; Attendance: 20,933; Referee: David Coote

2 January 2019 21	West Ham United	2–2	Brighton & Hove Albion	Stratford, London
19:45 GMT	Arnautović 66', 68'	Report	Stephens 56'; Duffy 58'; March (yellow card) 80'	Stadium: London Stadium; Attendance: 59,870; Referee: Chris Kavanagh

12 January 2019 22	West Ham United	1–0	Arsenal	Stratford
12:30 GMT	Rice 48'	Report	Mustafi (yellow card) 46'; Kolašinac (yellow card) 60'	Stadium: London Stadium; Attendance: 59,946; Referee: Jonathan Moss

19 January 2019 23	Bournemouth	2–0	West Ham United	Bournemouth
15:00 GMT	Wilson 53'; King 90+1'	Report	Carroll (yellow card) 18'	Stadium: Dean Court; Attendance: 10,495; Referee: Simon Hooper

29 January 2019 24	Wolverhampton Wanderers	3–0	West Ham United	Wolverhampton
19:45 GMT	Saïss 66'; Jiménez 80', 86'	Report		Stadium: Molineux; Attendance: 31,122; Referee: David Coote

4 February 2019 25	West Ham United	1–1	Liverpool	Stratford, London
20:00 GMT	Antonio 28'; Hernández (yellow card) 60'	Report	Mané 22'; Matip (yellow card) 54'	Stadium: London Stadium; Attendance: 59,903; Referee: Kevin Friend

9 February 2019 26	Crystal Palace	1–1	West Ham United	Selhurst, London
15:00 GMT	Wan-Bissaka (yellow card) 35'; Milivojević (yellow card) 43'; McArthur (yellow card) 45+1'; Zaha 76'	Report	Noble 27' (pen.)	Stadium: Selhurst Park; Attendance: 25,552; Referee: Craig Pawson

22 February 2019 27	West Ham United	3–1	Fulham	Stratford, London
19:45 GMT	Hernández 29'; Diop 40'; Lanzini (yellow card) 83'; Antonio 90+1'	Report	Babel 3'; Bryan (yellow card) 45'	Stadium: London Stadium; Attendance: 59,950; Referee: Lee Mason

27 February 2019 28	Manchester City	1–0	West Ham United	Manchester
20:00 GMT	Agüero 59' (pen.)	Report	Fredericks (yellow card) 41'; Antonio (yellow card) 87'	Stadium: Etihad Stadium; Attendance: 53,528; Referee: Stuart Attwell

2 March 2019 29	West Ham United	2–0	Newcastle United	Stratford, London
17:30 GMT	Rice 7'; Noble (yellow card) 26', (goal) 42' (pen.); Masuaku (yellow card) 67'; Diop (yellow card) 88'	Report	Schär (yellow card) 37'; Longstaff (yellow card) 40'; Hayden (yellow card) 67'; Dúbravka (yellow card) 85'	Stadium: London Stadium; Attendance: 59,910; Referee: Chris Kavanagh

9 March 2019 30	Cardiff City	2–0	West Ham United	Cardiff
15:00 GMT	Hoilett 4'; Arter (yellow card) 29'; Camarasa 52'; Morrison (yellow card) 86'	Report	Hernández (yellow card) 37'	Stadium: Cardiff City Stadium; Attendance: 32,458; Referee: Graham Scott

16 March 2019 31	West Ham United	4–3	Huddersfield Town	Stratford, London
15:00 GMT	Noble 15' (pen.); Ogbonna 75'; Hernández 84', 90+1'	Report	Bacuna 17'; Grant 30', 65'; Pritchard (yellow card) 74'; Billing (yellow card) 78'	Stadium: London Stadium; Attendance: 59,931; Referee: Jonathan Moss

30 March 2019 32	West Ham United	0–2	Everton	Stratford, London
17:30 GMT	Rice (yellow card) 64'	Report	Zouma 5'; Bernard 33'; Richarlison (yellow card) 42'	Stadium: London Stadium; Attendance: 59,988; Referee: Paul Tierney

8 April 2019 33	Chelsea	2–0	West Ham United	Fulham, London
20:00 BST	Hazard 24', 90'; Azpilicueta (yellow card) 82'; Arrizabalaga (yellow card) 84'	Report	Ogbonna (yellow card) 11'	Stadium: Stamford Bridge; Attendance: 40,537; Referee: Chris Kavanagh

13 April 2019 34	Manchester United	2–1	West Ham United	Manchester
17:30 BST	Pogba 19' (pen.), 80' (pen.); Mata (yellow card) 34'	Report	Felipe Anderson 49'; Fredericks (yellow card) 79'	Stadium: Old Trafford; Attendance: 74,478; Referee: Graham Scott

20 April 2019 35	West Ham United	2–2	Leicester City	Stratford, London
15:00 BST	Antonio 37'; Snodgrass (yellow card) 49'; Rice (yellow card) 70'; Pérez 82'	Report	Vardy 67'; Barnes 90+2'	Stadium: London Stadium; Attendance: 59,960; Referee: Lee Probert

27 April 2019 36	Tottenham Hotspur	0–1	West Ham United	Tottenham, London
12:30 BST		Report	Snodgrass (yellow card) 26'; Antonio 67'; Fredericks (yellow card) 86'	Stadium: Tottenham Hotspur Stadium; Attendance: 60,043; Referee: Anthony Taylor

4 May 2019 37	West Ham United	3–0	Southampton	Stratford, London
15:00 BST	Arnautović 16', 69'; Lanzini (yellow card) 63'; Fredericks 72'	Report	Romeu (yellow card) 80'	Stadium: London Stadium; Attendance: 59,961; Referee: Stuart Attwell

12 May 2019 38	Watford	1–4	West Ham United	Watford
15:00 BST	Deulofeu 46'; Holebas (red card) 48'; Capoue (yellow card) 90+1'	Report	Noble 15', 78' (pen.); Lanzini 39'; Arnautović 71'	Stadium: Vicarage Road; Attendance: 20,067; Referee: Chris Kavanagh

=== FA Cup ===
The third round draw was made live on the BBC by Ruud Gullit and Paul Ince from Stamford Bridge on 3 December 2018. The fourth round draw was made live on the BBC by Robbie Keane and Carl Ikeme from Molineux on 7 January 2019.

5 January 2019 Third round	West Ham United	2–0	Birmingham City	Stratford
12:30 GMT	Arnautović 2'; Diop (yellow card) 51'; Carroll 90+1'	Report	G. Gardner (yellow card) 19'	Stadium: London Stadium; Attendance: 54,840; Referee: Roger East

26 January 2019 Fourth round	AFC Wimbledon	4–2	West Ham United	Kingston upon Thames
19:45 GMT	Appiah 34'; Wagstaff 41', 46'; Sibbick 88'	Report	Pérez 57'; Fredericks (yellow card) 67'; Felipe Anderson 71'; Masuaku (yellow card) 79'	Stadium: Kingsmeadow; Attendance: 4,777; Referee: Anthony Taylor

=== EFL Cup ===
West Ham United entered the competition in the second round and were drawn away to AFC Wimbledon. It was the first competitive meeting between the clubs since AFC Wimbledon were formed in 2002. The third round draw was made on 30 August 2018 by David Seaman and Joleon Lescott. West Ham were drawn at home against Macclesfield Town, only the third senior meeting between the two teams. The 8–0 win was West Ham's biggest victory for 35 years. The fourth round draw was made live on Quest by Rachel Yankey and Rachel Riley on 29 September. West Ham lost the subsequent fourth round tie 1–3 at home against rivals Tottenham Hotspur.

28 August 2018 Second round	AFC Wimbledon	1–3	West Ham United	Kingston upon Thames
19:45 BST	Pigott 2'; McDonald (red card) 18'	Report	Diop 63'; Ogbonna 83'; Hernández 90+2'	Stadium: Kingsmeadow; Attendance: 3,962; Referee: Tim Robinson

26 September 2018 Third round	West Ham United	8–0	Macclesfield Town	Stratford, London
19:45 BST	Antonio 29'; Snodgrass 32', 60'; Pérez 40'; Fredericks 51'; Ogbonna 54'; Diangana 67', 82'	Report		Stadium: London Stadium; Attendance: 24,833; Referee: Craig Pawson

31 October 2018 Fourth round	West Ham United	1–3	Tottenham Hotspur	Stratford, London
19:45 GMT	Pérez 71'	Report	Son Heung-min 16', 54'; Llorente 75'	Stadium: London Stadium; Attendance: 50,270; Referee: Stuart Attwell

== Transfers ==
=== Transfers in ===
Date from	Position	Nationality	Name	From	Fee	Ref.
1 July 2018	CB	(France)	Issa Diop	Toulouse	£22,000,000	
1 July 2018	GK	(Poland)	Łukasz Fabiański	Swansea City	£7,000,000	
1 July 2018	RB	(England)	Ryan Fredericks	Fulham	Free	
1 July 2018	CM	(Slovakia)	Sebastian Nebyla	Spartak Trnava	Undisclosed	
9 July 2018	CM	(England)	Jack Wilshere	Arsenal	Free	
11 July 2018	RW	(Ukraine)	Andriy Yarmolenko	Borussia Dortmund	£17,500,000	
14 July 2018	CB	(Paraguay)	Fabián Balbuena	Corinthians	Undisclosed	
15 July 2018	RW	(Brazil)	Felipe Anderson	Lazio	£36,000,000	
2 August 2018	SS	(Portugal)	Xande Silva	Vitória Guimarães	£2,000,000	
9 August 2018	CF	(Spain)	Lucas Pérez	Arsenal	£4,000,000	
9 August 2018	DM	(Colombia)	Carlos Sánchez	Fiorentina	Undisclosed	
31 December 2018	LW	(France)	Samir Nasri	Free agent	Free transfer	
30 January 2019	RW	(Portugal)	Mesaque Djú	Benfica	Free transfer	

=== Transfers out ===
Date from	Position	Nationality	Name	To	Fee	Ref.
1 July 2018	CB	(Wales)	James Collins	Free agent	Released	(Note: James Collins joined Ipswich Town in January 2019.)
1 July 2018	LB	(France)	Patrice Evra	Free agent	Released	
1 July 2018	MF	(England)	Korrey Henry	Yeovil Town	Free transfer	
1 July 2018	LB	(England)	Rosaire Longelo	Newcastle United	Free transfer	
1 July 2018	GK	(Latvia)	Rihards Matrevics	Barnet	Free transfer	
4 July 2018	CB	(England)	Ben Wells	Queens Park Rangers	Free transfer	
10 July 2018	CB	(England)	Reece Burke	Hull City	£1,500,000	
1 August 2018	DM	(Senegal)	Cheikhou Kouyaté	Crystal Palace	£9,500,000	
9 August 2018	CM	(Portugal)	Domingos Quina	Watford	£1,000,000	

=== Loans out ===
Start date	Position	Nationality	Name	To	End date	Ref.
24 July 2018	AM	(England)	Marcus Browne	Oxford United	End of season	
25 July 2018	AM	(Norway)	Martin Samuelsen	VVV-Venlo	20 February 2019	
6 August 2018	LM	(Montenegro)	Sead Hakšabanović	Málaga	20 January 2019	
8 August 2018	CF	(England)	Jordan Hugill	Middlesbrough	End of season	
10 August 2018	RB	(England)	Sam Byram	Nottingham Forest	End of season	
13 August 2018	AM	(Switzerland)	Edimilson Fernandes	Fiorentina	End of season	
13 August 2018	CF	(Spain)	Toni Martínez	Rayo Majadahonda	18 January 2019	
30 August 2018	CM	(Republic of Ireland)	Josh Cullen	Charlton Athletic	End of season	
4 January 2019	LB	(England)	Vashon Neufville	Newport County	End of season	
11 January 2019	CM	(England)	Moses Makasi	Stevenage	End of season	
18 January 2019	CF	(Spain)	Toni Martínez	Lugo	End of season	
20 January 2019	LM	(Montenegro)	Sead Hakšabanović	IFK Norrköping	May 2020	
21 January 2019	AM	(England)	Joe Powell	Northampton Town	31 May 2019	
31 January 2019	CF	(England)	Oladapo Afolayan	Oldham Athletic	31 May 2019	
31 January 2019	CB	(England)	Reece Oxford	Augsburg	31 May 2019	
20 February 2019	AM	(Norway)	Martin Samuelsen	FK Haugesund	30 June 2019	

== Statistics ==
=== Appearances and goals ===
Correct as of match played 12 May 2019

No.	Pos	Nat	Player	Total		Premier League		FA Cup		League Cup	
No.	Pos	Nat	Player	Apps	Goals	Apps	Goals	Apps	Goals	Apps	Goals
Goalkeepers
1	GK	(Poland) POL	Łukasz Fabiański	38	0	38	0	0	0	0	0
13	GK	(Spain) ESP	Adrián	5	0	0	0	2	0	3	0
Defenders
2	DF	(New Zealand) NZL	Winston Reid	0	0	0	0	0	0	0	0
3	DF	(England) ENG	Aaron Cresswell	22	0	18+2	0	0	0	2	0
4	DF	(Paraguay) PAR	Fabián Balbuena	23	1	23	1	0	0	0	0
5	DF	(Argentina) ARG	Pablo Zabaleta	27	0	23+3	0	0	0	1	0
21	DF	(Italy) ITA	Angelo Ogbonna	29	3	20+4	1	2	0	3	2
23	DF	(France) FRA	Issa Diop	38	2	33	1	2	0	3	1
24	DF	(England) ENG	Ryan Fredericks	18	2	12+3	1	0+1	0	2	1
26	DF	(Democratic Republic of the Congo) COD	Arthur Masuaku	27	0	19+4	0	2	0	1+1	0
53	DF	(England) ENG	Ben Johnson	1	0	1	0	0	0	0	0
Midfielders
11	MF	(Scotland) SCO	Robert Snodgrass	38	4	25+8	2	1+1	0	2+1	2
14	MF	(Equatorial Guinea) GEQ	Pedro Obiang	29	0	12+12	0	2	0	3	0
15	MF	(Colombia) COL	Carlos Sánchez	8	0	2+5	0	0	0	1	0
16	MF	(England) ENG	Mark Noble	32	5	29+2	5	1	0	0	0
18	MF	(France) FRA	Samir Nasri	6	0	3+2	0	1	0	0	0
19	MF	(England) ENG	Jack Wilshere	7	0	4+3	0	0	0	0	0
30	MF	(England) ENG	Michail Antonio	38	7	22+11	6	2	0	2+1	1
41	MF	(England) ENG	Declan Rice	38	2	34	2	1	0	2+1	0
45	MF	(England) ENG	Grady Diangana	21	2	6+11	0	2	0	2	2
54	MF	(Republic of Ireland) IRL	Conor Coventry	1	0	0	0	0	0	0+1	0
Forwards
7	FW	(Austria) AUT	Marko Arnautović	30	11	24+4	10	1	1	0+1	0
8	FW	(Brazil) BRA	Felipe Anderson	40	10	36	9	0+2	1	1+1	0
9	FW	(England) ENG	Andy Carroll	14	1	3+9	0	1+1	1	0	0
10	FW	(Argentina) ARG	Manuel Lanzini	10	1	8+2	1	0	0	0	0
17	FW	(Mexico) MEX	Javier Hernández	28	8	14+11	7	1	0	2	1
20	FW	(Ukraine) UKR	Andriy Yarmolenko	10	2	5+4	2	0	0	1	0
27	FW	(Spain) ESP	Lucas Pérez	19	6	4+11	3	0+1	1	2+1	2
32	FW	(Portugal) POR	Xande Silva	2	0	0+1	0	1	0	0	0
Players who left the club permanently or on loan during the season
50	MF	(England) ENG	Joe Powell	1	0	0	0	0	0	0+1	0

=== Goalscorers ===
Correct as of match played 12 May 2019

Rank	Pos	No.	Nat	Name	Premier League	FA Cup	League Cup	Total
1	FW	7	(Austria)	Marko Arnautović	10	1	0	11
2	FW	8	(Brazil)	Felipe Anderson	9	1	0	10
3	FW	17	(Mexico)	Javier Hernández	7	0	1	8
4	MF	30	(England)	Michail Antonio	6	0	1	7
5	FW	27	(Spain)	Lucas Pérez	3	1	2	6
6	MF	16	(England)	Mark Noble	5	0	0	5
7	MF	11	(Scotland)	Robert Snodgrass	2	0	2	4
8	DF	21	(Italy)	Angelo Ogbonna	1	0	2	3
9	FW	20	(Ukraine)	Andriy Yarmolenko	2	0	0	2
9	DF	23	(France)	Issa Diop	1	0	1	2
9	DF	24	(England)	Ryan Fredericks	1	0	1	2
9	MF	41	(England)	Declan Rice	2	0	0	2
9	MF	45	(England)	Grady Diangana	0	0	2	2
14	FW	9	(England)	Andy Carroll	0	1	0	1
14	DF	4	(Paraguay)	Fabián Balbuena	1	0	0	1
14	MF	10	(Argentina)	Manuel Lanzini	1	0	0	1
14	Own goals				1	0	0	1
Totals					52	4	12	68
