= 2020–21 West Ham United F.C. season =

English football team season

West Ham United
2020–21 season
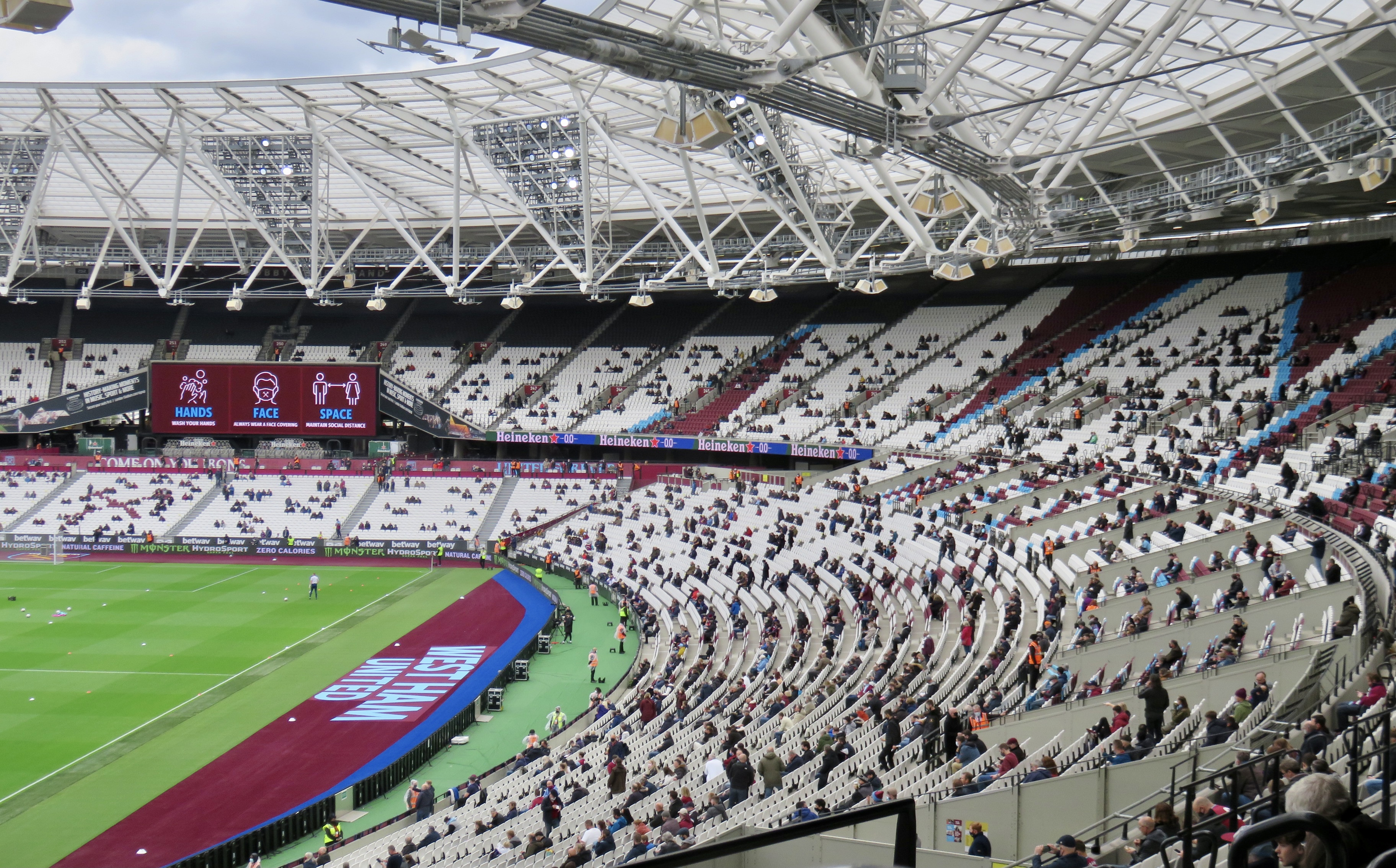
- The London Stadium before a game against Southampton
- Co-chairmen: David Sullivan and David Gold
- Manager: David Moyes
- Stadium: London Stadium
- Premier League: 6th
- FA Cup: Fifth round
- EFL Cup: Fourth round
- Top goalscorer: League: Michail Antonio; Tomáš Souček (10 each); All: Michail Antonio; Tomáš Souček (10 each)
- Highest home attendance: 10,000
- Lowest home attendance: 2,000
Home colours	Away colours	Third colours

The 2020–21 season was the 126th season in existence of West Ham United Football Club and the club's ninth consecutive season in the top flight of English football. In addition to the domestic league, West Ham United participated in this season's edition of the FA Cup, and reached the fourth round of the EFL Cup. They finished sixth in the Premier League achieving 65 points, a club Premier League points record. They also won 19 games and nine away games, also records. Their league positioned qualified them to play in the 2021–22 UEFA Europa League.

== Season squad ==
Squad No.	Name	Nationality	Position(s)	Date of birth (age)
Goalkeepers
1	Łukasz Fabiański	(Poland)	GK	18 April 1985 (aged 36)
25	David Martin	(England)	GK	22 January 1986 (aged 35)
35	Darren Randolph	(Republic of Ireland)	GK	12 May 1987 (aged 34)
Defenders
3	Aaron Cresswell	(England)	DF	15 December 1989 (aged 31)
4	Fabián Balbuena	(Paraguay)	DF	23 August 1991 (aged 29)
5	Vladimír Coufal	(Czech Republic)	DF	22 August 1992 (aged 28)
14	Frederik Alves	(Denmark)	DF	8 November 1999 (aged 21)
15	Craig Dawson (on loan from Watford)	(England)	DF	6 May 1990 (aged 31)
21	Angelo Ogbonna	(Italy)	DF	23 May 1988 (aged 33)
23	Issa Diop	(France)	DF	9 January 1997 (aged 24)
24	Ryan Fredericks	(England)	DF	10 October 1992 (aged 28)
26	Arthur Masuaku	(Democratic Republic of the Congo)	DF	7 November 1993 (aged 27)
31	Ben Johnson	(England)	DF	24 January 2000 (aged 21)
Midfielders
10	Manuel Lanzini	(Argentina)	MF	15 February 1993 (aged 28)
11	Jesse Lingard (on loan from Manchester United)	(England)	MF	15 December 1992 (aged 28)
16	Mark Noble (C)	(England)	MF	8 May 1987 (aged 34)
18	Pablo Fornals	(Spain)	MF	22 February 1996 (aged 25)
28	Tomáš Souček	(Czech Republic)	MF	27 February 1995 (aged 26)
41	Declan Rice	(England)	MF	14 January 1999 (aged 22)
Forwards
7	Andriy Yarmolenko	(Ukraine)	FW	23 October 1989 (aged 31)
9	Saïd Benrahma	(Algeria)	FW	10 August 1995 (aged 25)
20	Jarrod Bowen	(England)	FW	20 December 1996 (aged 24)
30	Michail Antonio	(England)	FW	28 March 1990 (aged 31)

Last updated: 23 May 2021.
Source: West Ham United F.C.

== Transfers ==
=== Transfers in ===
Date from	Position	Nationality	Name	From	Fee	Team	Ref.
1 July 2020	CB	(Northern Ireland)	Michael Forbes	(Northern Ireland) Dungannon Swifts	Undisclosed	Academy	
17 July 2020	MF	(Bermuda)	Remy Coddington	(England) Bournemouth	Undisclosed	Academy	
24 July 2020	DM	(Czech Republic)	Tomáš Souček	(Czech Republic) Slavia Prague	£15,000,000	First team	
2 September 2020	CM	(England)	Ossama Ashley	(England) AFC Wimbledon	Free transfer	Academy	
2 October 2020	RB	(Czech Republic)	Vladimír Coufal	(Czech Republic) Slavia Prague	£5,000,000	First team	
2 January 2021	CB	(Denmark)	Frederik Alves	(Denmark) Silkeborg	Undisclosed	First team	
28 January 2021	LW	(Algeria)	Saïd Benrahma	(England) Brentford	Undisclosed	First team	

=== Loans in ===
Date from	Position	Nationality	Name	From	Date until	Team	Ref.
12 October 2020	CB	(England)	Craig Dawson	(England) Watford	End of season	First team	
16 October 2020	LW	(Algeria)	Saïd Benrahma	(England) Brentford	29 January 2021	First team	
29 January 2021	MF	(England)	Jesse Lingard	(England) Manchester United	End of season	First team	

=== Loans out ===
Date from	Position	Nationality	Name	To	Date until	Team	Ref.
3 September 2020	RW	(England)	Dan Kemp	(England) Blackpool	15 January 2021	Under-23s	
6 October 2020	CB	(England)	Tunji Akinola	(England) Leyton Orient	End of season	Under-23s	
6 October 2020	FW	(Portugal)	Xande Silva	(Greece) Aris Thessaloniki	End of season	Under-23s	
6 October 2020	AM	(Brazil)	Felipe Anderson	(Portugal) Porto	End of season	First team	
30 January 2021	CB	(Portugal)	Gonçalo Cardoso	(Switzerland) Basel	June 2022	Under-23s	
1 February 2021	LW	(England)	Oladapo Afolayan	(England) Bolton Wanderers	End of season	Under-23s	
1 February 2021	CB	(England)	Aji Alese	(England) Cambridge United	End of season	Under-23s	
1 February 2021	CB	(New Zealand)	Winston Reid	(England) Brentford	End of season	First team	
23 February 2021	CM	(England)	Alfie Lewis	(Republic of Ireland) St Patrick's Athletic	End of season	Under-23s	

=== Transfers out ===
Date from	Position	Nationality	Name	To	Fee	Team	Ref.
1 July 2020	RB	(England)	Jeremy Ngakia	(England) Watford	Free transfer	First team	
1 July 2020	DM	(Colombia)	Carlos Sánchez	(England) Watford	Released	First team	
1 July 2020	RB	(Argentina)	Pablo Zabaleta	Retired		First team	
30 July 2020	DM	(England)	Jake Giddings	(England) Crystal Palace	Free transfer	Academy	
4 August 2020	CM	(Slovakia)	Sebastian Nebyla	(Slovakia) Dunajska Streda	Undisclosed	Academy	
13 August 2020	CF	(Switzerland)	Albian Ajeti	(Scotland) Celtic	£5,000,000	First team	
19 August 2020	CF	(England)	Veron Parkes	(Netherlands) Fortuna Sittard	Free transfer	Academy	
24 August 2020	CF	(England)	Jordan Hugill	(England) Norwich City	Undisclosed	First team	
28 August 2020	GK	(Spain)	Roberto	(Spain) Valladolid	Free transfer	First team	
2 September 2020	LW	(England)	Benicio Baker-Boaitey	(Portugal) Porto	Undisclosed	Academy	
19 September 2020	LB	(England)	Reece Hannam	(England) Crystal Palace	Free transfer	Academy	
4 September 2020	LW	(England)	Grady Diangana	(England) West Bromwich Albion	Undisclosed	First team	
4 September 2020	CM	(Republic of Ireland)	Josh Cullen	(Belgium) Anderlecht	Undisclosed	First team	
5 October 2020	CM	(England)	Jack Wilshere	(England) Bournemouth	Free transfer	First team	
18 November 2020	AM	(England)	Louie Watson	(England) Derby County	Free transfer	Academy	
8 January 2021	CF	(Ivory Coast)	Sébastien Haller	(Netherlands) Ajax	Undisclosed	First team	
8 January 2021	RW	(Scotland)	Robert Snodgrass	(England) West Bromwich Albion	Undisclosed	First team	
15 January 2021	RW	(England)	Dan Kemp	(England) Leyton Orient	Undisclosed	Under-23s	

== Pre-season and friendlies ==
In March 2020, West Ham announced their participation in a July 2020 tournament, the EVA Air Queensland Champions Cup, in Queensland, Australia alongside Brisbane Roar and Crystal Palace. Following the outbreak of COVID-19, the tour was cancelled.

25 August 2020 Friendly	Ipswich Town	1–4	West Ham United	Ipswich
14:00	Sears 62'	Report	Haller 45', 60', 64'; Souček 63'	Stadium: Portman Road; Attendance: 0

25 August 2020 Friendly	Wycombe Wanderers	1–5	West Ham United	High Wycombe
14:00	Samuel 31'	Report	Masuaku 8'; Charles 29' (o.g.); Lanzini 35'; Bowen 42', 59'	Stadium: Adams Park; Attendance: 0

29 August 2020 Friendly	West Ham United	2–1	Brentford	Stratford, London
14:00	Yarmolenko 5'; Souček 61'	Report	Forss 32'	Stadium: London Stadium; Attendance: 0 Referee: Stuart Attwell

5 September 2020 Betway Cup	West Ham United	3–5	Bournemouth	Stratford, London
15:00	Bowen 38', 42'; Felipe Anderson 84'	Report	Danjuma 5'; Solanke 17'; Gosling 57'; Smith 62'; Anthony 67'	Stadium: London Stadium; Attendance: 0

== Competitions ==
=== Overview ===
Competition	First match	Last match	Starting round	Final position	Record							
Competition	First match	Last match	Starting round	Final position	Pld	W	D	L	GF	GA	GD	Win %
Premier League	12 September 2020	23 May 2021	Matchday 1	6th	38	19	8	11	62	47	+15	50.00
FA Cup	11 January 2021	9 February 2021	Third round	Fifth round	3	2	0	1	5	1	+4	66.67
EFL Cup	15 September 2020	30 September 2020	Second round	Fourth round	3	2	0	1	9	5	+4	66.67
Total					44	23	8	13	76	53	+23	52.27

Source: Soccerway

=== Premier League ===
==== League table ====
Pos	Team	Pld	W	D	L	GF	GA	GD	Pts	Qualification or relegation
4	Chelsea	38	19	10	9	58	36	+22	67	Qualification for the Champions League group stage
5	Leicester City	38	20	6	12	68	50	+18	66	Qualification for the Europa League group stage (Note: Since the winners of the 2020–21 FA Cup, Leicester City, also qualified for the Europa League based on league position, the second Europa League group stage berth allocated to England was transferred to the sixth-placed team.)
6	West Ham United	38	19	8	11	62	47	+15	65	Qualification for the Europa League group stage
7	Tottenham Hotspur	38	18	8	12	68	45	+23	62	Qualification for the Europa Conference League play-off round (Note: Since the winners of the 2020–21 EFL Cup, Manchester City, qualified for European competition based on league position, the Europa Conference League berth awarded to the EFL Cup winners was transferred to the highest-placed Premier League team not already qualified for European competition, the seventh-placed team.)
8	Arsenal	38	18	7	13	55	39	+16	61	

Source: Premier League
Rules for classification: 1) Points; 2) Goal difference; 3) Goals scored; 4) If the champions, relegated teams or qualified teams for UEFA competitions cannot be determined by rules 1 to 3, rules 4.1 to 4.3 are applied – 4.1) Points gained in head-to-head record between such teams; 4.2) Away goals scored in head-to-head record between such teams; 4.3) Play-offs

==== Results summary ====
Overall								Home						Away					
Pld	W	D	L	GF	GA	GD	Pts	W	D	L	GF	GA	GD	W	D	L	GF	GA	GD
38	19	8	11	62	47	+15	65	10	4	5	32	22	+10	9	4	6	30	25	+5

==== Results by matchday ====
Matchday	1	2	3	4	5	6	7	8	9	10	11	12	13	14	15	16	17	18	19	20	21	22	23	24	25	26	27	28	29	30	31	32	33	34	35	36	37	38
Ground	H	A	H	A	A	H	A	H	A	H	H	A	H	A	H	A	A	H	H	A	H	A	A	H	H	A	H	A	H	A	H	A	H	A	H	A	A	H
Result	L	L	W	W	D	D	L	W	W	W	L	W	D	L	D	D	W	W	W	W	L	W	D	W	W	L	W	L	D	W	W	L	L	W	L	D	W	W
Position	14	16	11	10	10	12	14	12	8	5	8	6	8	10	10	10	10	9	7	5	5	5	6	5	4	4	5	5	5	4	4	5	5	5	5	7	6	6

A = Away; H = Home; W = Win; D = Draw; L = Loss

==== Matches ====
The 2020–21 season fixtures were released on 20 August.

12 September 2020 1	West Ham United	0–2	Newcastle United	Stratford
20:00 BST	Fredericks (yellow card) 54'; Yarmolenko (yellow card) 70'	Report	Hayden (yellow card) 13'; Wilson 56'; Manquillo (yellow card) 68'; Hendrick 87'	Stadium: London Stadium; Attendance: 0 Referee: Stuart Attwell

19 September 2020 2	Arsenal	2–1	West Ham United	Highbury, London
20:00 BST	Lacazette 25'; Nketiah 86'	Report	Fredericks (yellow card) 40'; Antonio 45'	Stadium: Emirates Stadium; Attendance: 0 Referee: Michael Oliver

27 September 2020 3	West Ham United	4–0	Wolverhampton Wanderers	Stratford
19:00 BST	Bowen 17', 57'; Jiménez 66' (o.g.); Haller 90+3'	Report	Coady (yellow card) 51'	Stadium: London Stadium; Attendance: 0 Referee: Martin Atkinson

4 October 2020 4	Leicester City	0–3	West Ham United	Leicester
12:00 BST	Mendy (yellow card) 24'; Evans (yellow card) 53'	Report	Antonio 14'; Fornals 34', (yellow card) 67'; Coufal (yellow card) 80'; Bowen 83'	Stadium: King Power Stadium; Attendance: 0 Referee: Andrew Madley

18 October 2020 5	Tottenham Hotspur	3–3	West Ham United	Tottenham, London
16:30 BST	Son Heung-min 1'; Kane 8', 16'	Report	Antonio (yellow card) 20'; Ogbonna (yellow card) 72'; Souček (yellow card) 77'; Balbuena 82'; Sánchez 85' (o.g.); Masuaku (yellow card) 90'; Lanzini 90+4', (yellow card) 90+5'	Stadium: Tottenham Hotspur Stadium; Attendance: 0 Referee: Paul Tierney

24 October 2020 6	West Ham United	1–1	Manchester City	Stratford
12:30 BST	Antonio 18'; Coufal (yellow card) 51'; Balbuena (yellow card) 90+2'	Report	Foden 51'	Stadium: London Stadium; Attendance: 0 Referee: Anthony Taylor

31 October 2020 7	Liverpool	2–1	West Ham United	Liverpool
17:30 GMT	Salah 42' (pen.); Jota 85'	Report	Fornals 10'; Rice (yellow card) 49'	Stadium: Anfield; Attendance: 0 Referee: Kevin Friend

7 November 2020 8	West Ham United	1–0	Fulham	Stratford
20:00 GMT	Ogbonna (yellow card) 56'; Souček 90+1'; Diop (yellow card) 90+8'	Report	Mitrović (yellow card) 55'; Loftus-Cheek (yellow card) 88'	Stadium: London Stadium; Attendance: 0 Referee: Robert Jones

22 November 2020 9	Sheffield United	0–1	West Ham United	Sheffield
14:00 GMT		Report	Haller 56'	Stadium: Bramall Lane; Attendance: 0 Referee: Martin Atkinson

30 November 2020 10	West Ham United	2–1	Aston Villa	Stratford
20:00 GMT	Ogbonna 2'; Bowen 46'; Fornals (yellow card) 53'	Report	Grealish 25'; Cash (yellow card) 68'; Watkins (penalty missed) 74'	Stadium: London Stadium; Attendance: 0 Referee: Peter Bankes

5 December 2020 11	West Ham United	1–3	Manchester United	Stratford
17:30 GMT	Souček 38'	Report	Pogba 65'; Greenwood 68'; Rashford 78'	Stadium: London Stadium; Attendance: 2,000; Referee: Andre Marriner

11 December 2020 12	Leeds United	1–2	West Ham United	Leeds
20:00 GMT	Klich 6' (pen.); Alioski (yellow card) 33'	Report	Fabiański (yellow card) 3'; Souček 25'; Ogbonna 80'; Noble (yellow card) 90+1'	Stadium: Elland Road; Attendance: 0 Referee: Michael Oliver

16 December 2020 13	West Ham United	1–1	Crystal Palace	Stratford
20:00 GMT	Haller 55'	Report	Benteke (yellow card) 31' (yellow-red card) 70', (goal) 34'; Milivojević (yellow card) 75'	Stadium: London Stadium; Attendance: 0 Referee: David Coote

21 December 2020 14	Chelsea	3–0	West Ham United	Fulham, London
20:00 GMT	Thiago Silva 10'; Abraham 78', 80'	Report		Stadium: Stamford Bridge; Attendance: 0 Referee: Chris Kavanagh

27 December 2020 15	West Ham United	2–2	Brighton & Hove Albion	Stratford
14:15 GMT	Johnson 60'; Souček 82'	Report	Maupay 44'; Dunk 70'	Stadium: London Stadium; Attendance: 0 Referee: Simon Hooper

29 December 2020 16	Southampton	0–0	West Ham United	Southampton
18:00 GMT	Bertrand (yellow card) 40'; Djenepo (yellow card) 72'; Walker-Peters (yellow card) 76'	Report	Yarmolenko (yellow card) 67'	Stadium: St Mary's Stadium; Attendance: 0 Referee: Andrew Madley

1 January 2021 17	Everton	0–1	West Ham United	Liverpool
17:30 GMT	Godfrey (yellow card) 59'; Davies (yellow card) 77'	Report	Souček 86'	Stadium: Goodison Park; Attendance: 0 Referee: Kevin Friend

16 January 2021 18	West Ham United	1–0	Burnley	Stratford
15:00 GMT	Antonio 9'; Souček (yellow card) 73'; Ogbonna (yellow card) 83'	Report	Barnes (yellow card) 63'	Stadium: London Stadium; Attendance: 0 Referee: Chris Kavanagh

19 January 2021 19	West Ham United	2–1	West Bromwich Albion	Stratford
18:00 GMT	Bowen 45+1'; Antonio 66'	Report	Pereira 51'; Gallagher (yellow card) 90+3'	Stadium: London Stadium; Attendance: 0 Referee: Graham Scott

26 January 2021 20	Crystal Palace	2–3	West Ham United	Selhurst, London
18:00 GMT	Zaha 3'; Batshuayi 90+7'	Report	Souček 9', 25'; Dawson 65'	Stadium: Selhurst Park; Attendance: 0 Referee: Stuart Attwell

31 January 2021 21	West Ham United	1–3	Liverpool	Stratford
16:30 GMT	Rice (yellow card) 47'; Souček (yellow card) 49'; Dawson 87'	Report	Salah 57', 68'; Wijnaldum 84'	Stadium: London Stadium; Attendance: 0 Referee: Jonathan Moss

3 February 2021 22	Aston Villa	1–3	West Ham United	Aston, Birmingham
20:15 GMT	Douglas Luiz (yellow card) 70'; Watkins 81'	Report	Souček 51'; Lingard 56', 83'; Cresswell (yellow card) 65'	Stadium: Villa Park; Attendance: 0 Referee: Andrew Madley

6 February 2021 23	Fulham	0–0	West Ham United	Fulham, London
17:30 GMT	Andersen (yellow card) 90+3'	Report	Ogbonna (yellow card) 75'; Fabiański (yellow card) 90'; Yarmolenko (yellow card) 90+3'; Souček (red card) 90+7'	Stadium: Craven Cottage; Attendance: 0 Referee: Mike Dean

15 February 2021 24	West Ham United	3–0	Sheffield United	Stratford
18:00 GMT	Rice 41' (pen.); Diop 58'; Fredericks 90+6'	Report	Basham (yellow card) 39'; Lundstram (yellow card) 87'	Stadium: London Stadium; Attendance: 0 Referee: Simon Hooper

21 February 2021 25	West Ham United	2–1	Tottenham Hotspur	Stratford
12:00 GMT	Antonio 5', (yellow card) 69'; Lingard 47'; Souček (yellow card) 56'; Diop (yellow card) 62'; Fornals (yellow card) 72'	Report	Lamela (yellow card) 36'; Højbjerg (yellow card) 42'; Reguilón (yellow card) 44'; Lucas 64'	Stadium: London Stadium; Attendance: 0 Referee: Craig Pawson

27 February 2021 26	Manchester City	2–1	West Ham United	Manchester
12:30 GMT	Dias 30'; Stones 68'; Fernandinho (yellow card) 90+3'	Report	Johnson (yellow card) 28'; Antonio 43'	Stadium: City of Manchester Stadium; Attendance: 0 Referee: Michael Oliver

8 March 2021 27	West Ham United	2–0	Leeds United	Stratford
20:00 GMT	Lingard (penalty missed) 21', 21', (yellow card) 79'; Dawson 28'	Report	Phillips (yellow card) 49'	Stadium: London Stadium; Attendance: 0 Referee: Mike Dean

14 March 2021 28	Manchester United	1–0	West Ham United	Manchester
19:15 GMT	Wan-Bissaka (yellow card) 35'; McTominay (yellow card) 49'; Dawson 53' (o.g.); Rashford (yellow card) 76'; James (yellow card) 90+1'	Report		Stadium: Old Trafford; Attendance: 0 Referee: Martin Atkinson

21 March 2021 29	West Ham United	3–3	Arsenal	Stratford
15:00 GMT	Lingard 15'; Bowen 17'; Souček 32'; Coufal (yellow card) 59'; Antonio (yellow card) 88'; Cresswell (yellow card) 89'	Report	Souček 38' (o.g.); Dawson 61' (o.g.); Lacazette 82', (yellow card) 90+3'	Stadium: London Stadium; Attendance: 0 Referee: Jonathan Moss

5 April 2021 30	Wolverhampton Wanderers	2–3	West Ham United	Wolverhampton
20:15 BST	Dendoncker 44'; Silva 68'; Neves (yellow card) 85'	Report	Dawson (yellow card) 4'; Lingard 6', (yellow card) 90+3'; Diop (yellow card) 10'; Fornals 14'; Bowen 38'; Souček (yellow card) 90+1'	Stadium: Molineux; Attendance: 0 Referee: Michael Oliver

11 April 2021 31	West Ham United	3–2	Leicester City	Stratford
14:05 BST	Souček (yellow card) 10'; Lingard 29', 44'; Cresswell (yellow card) 30'; Bowen 48'; Masuaku (yellow card) 90+2'	Report	Pereira (yellow card) 33'; Fofana (yellow card) 45+2'; Ndidi (yellow card) 46'; Iheanacho 70', 90+1'	Stadium: London Stadium; Attendance: 0 Referee: Mike Dean

17 April 2021 32	Newcastle United	3–2	West Ham United	Newcastle upon Tyne
12:30 BST	Shelvey (yellow card) 16'; Diop 36' (o.g.); Joelinton 41'; Willock 82'; Murphy (yellow card) 90+6'	Report	Dawson (yellow card) 12' (yellow-red card) 36'; Diop 73'; Lingard 80' (pen.)	Stadium: St James' Park; Attendance: 0 Referee: Kevin Friend

24 April 2021 33	West Ham United	0–1	Chelsea	Stratford
17:30 BST	Balbuena (red card) 81'	Report	Werner (yellow card) 35', (goal) 43'; Christensen (yellow card) 42'; Mendy (yellow card) 90+4'; Kanté (yellow card) 90+5'	Stadium: London Stadium; Attendance: 0 Referee: Chris Kavanagh

3 May 2021 34	Burnley	1–2	West Ham United	Burnley
20:15 BST	Wood 19' (pen.); Mee (yellow card) 85'; Guðmundsson (yellow card) 87'	Report	Antonio 21', 29'; Dawson (yellow card) 86'	Stadium: Turf Moor; Attendance: 0 Referee: Anthony Taylor

9 May 2021 35	West Ham United	0–1	Everton	Stratford
16:30 BST	Souček (yellow card) 72'; Lingard (yellow card) 75'	Report	Calvert-Lewin 24'; Allan (yellow card) 77'	Stadium: London Stadium; Attendance: 0 Referee: Stuart Attwell

15 May 2021 36	Brighton & Hove Albion	1–1	West Ham United	Falmer
20:00 BST	Bissouma (yellow card) 18'; Welbeck 84'	Report	Benrahma 87'	Stadium: Falmer Stadium; Attendance: 0 Referee: Andre Marriner

19 May 2021 37	West Bromwich Albion	1–3	West Ham United	West Bromwich
20:15 BST	Johnstone (yellow card) 1'; Pereira 27'; Yokuşlu (yellow card) 40'	Report	Rice (penalty missed) 3'; Ogbonna (yellow card) 34', (goal) 82'; Souček 45+1'; Dawson (yellow card) 87'; Antonio 88'	Stadium: The Hawthorns; Attendance: 5,371; Referee: Michael Oliver

23 May 2021 38	West Ham United	3–0	Southampton	Stratford
16:00 BST	Fornals 30', 33'; Rice 86'	Report	Bednarek (yellow card) 48'; Diallo (yellow card) 67'; Salisu (yellow card) 73'	Stadium: London Stadium; Attendance: 10,000; Referee: Martin Atkinson

=== FA Cup ===
The third round draw was made on 30 November, with Premier League and EFL Championship clubs all entering the competition. The draw for the fourth and fifth round were made on 11 January, conducted by Peter Crouch.

11 January 2021 Third round	Stockport County	0–1	West Ham United	Stockport
20:00 GMT		Report	Dawson 83'	Stadium: Edgeley Park; Attendance: 0 Referee: Mike Dean

23 January 2021 Fourth round	West Ham United	4–0	Doncaster Rovers	Stratford
15:00 GMT	Fornals 2'; Yarmolenko 32'; Butler 53' (o.g.); Afolayan 78'	Report		Stadium: London Stadium; Attendance: 0 Referee: Robert Jones

9 February 2021 Fifth round	Manchester United	1–0 (a.e.t.)	West Ham United	Manchester
19:30 GMT	McTominay 97'	Report		Stadium: Old Trafford; Attendance: 0 Referee: Paul Tierney

=== EFL Cup ===
The draw for both the second and third round were confirmed on 6 September, live on Sky Sports by Phil Babb. The fourth round draw was conducted on 17 September 2020 by Laura Woods and Lee Hendrie live on Sky Sports.

15 September 2020 Second round	West Ham United	3–0	Charlton Athletic	Stratford
19:30 BST	Johnson (yellow card) 5'; Haller 22', 26'; Masuaku (yellow card) 38'; Felipe Anderson 80'	Report		Stadium: London Stadium; Attendance: 0 Referee: Andre Marriner

22 September 2020 Third round	West Ham United	5–1	Hull City	Stratford
19:30 BST	Snodgrass 18'; Haller 45', 90+1'; Yarmolenko 56' (pen.), 90+2'	Report	McLoughlin (yellow card) 55'; Honeyman (yellow card) 59'; Fleming (yellow card) 65'; Wilks 70'	Stadium: London Stadium; Attendance: 0 Referee: Simon Hooper

30 September 2020 Fourth round	Everton	4–1	West Ham United	Liverpool
19:45 BST	Calvert-Lewin 11', 78', 84'; Richarlison 56'	Report	Snodgrass 46'	Stadium: Goodison Park; Attendance: 0 Referee: Darren England

== Statistics ==
- Correct as of 23 May 2021

=== Appearances and goals ===
No.	Pos	Nat	Player	Total		Premier League		FA Cup		League Cup	
No.	Pos	Nat	Player	Apps	Goals	Apps	Goals	Apps	Goals	Apps	Goals
Goalkeepers
1	GK	(Poland) POL	Łukasz Fabiański	37	0	35	0	2	0	0	0
34	GK	(England) ENG	Nathan Trott	1	0	0	0	0+1	0	0	0
35	GK	(Republic of Ireland) IRL	Darren Randolph	7	0	3	0	1	0	3	0
Defenders
3	DF	(England) ENG	Aaron Cresswell	39	0	36	0	1+1	0	1	0
4	DF	(Paraguay) PAR	Fabián Balbuena	18	1	13+1	1	1	0	3	0
5	DF	(Czech Republic) CZE	Vladimír Coufal	36	0	34	0	2	0	0	0
15	DF	(England) ENG	Craig Dawson	24	4	22	3	2	1	0	0
21	DF	(Italy) ITA	Angelo Ogbonna	30	3	28	3	2	0	0	0
23	DF	(France) FRA	Issa Diop	21	2	15+3	2	1+1	0	1	0
24	DF	(England) ENG	Ryan Fredericks	16	1	6+8	1	1+1	0	0	0
26	DF	(Democratic Republic of the Congo) COD	Arthur Masuaku	13	0	12	0	0	0	1	0
31	DF	(England) ENG	Ben Johnson	20	1	5+9	1	2+1	0	3	0
50	DF	(Scotland) SCO	Harrison Ashby	2	0	0	0	0	0	1+1	0
56	DF	(England) ENG	Emmanuel Longelo	1	0	0	0	0	0	0+1	0
75	DF	(England) ENG	Jamal Baptiste	1	0	0	0	0+1	0	0	0
Midfielders
11	MF	(England) ENG	Jesse Lingard	16	9	16	9	0	0	0	0
16	MF	(England) ENG	Mark Noble	25	0	8+13	0	3	0	1	0
18	MF	(Spain) ESP	Pablo Fornals	36	6	31+2	5	2+1	1	0	0
28	MF	(Czech Republic) CZE	Tomáš Souček	41	10	38	10	2+1	0	0	0
41	MF	(England) ENG	Declan Rice	35	2	32	2	2	0	1	0
54	MF	(Republic of Ireland) IRL	Conor Coventry	1	0	0	0	0	0	0+1	0
Forwards
7	FW	(Ukraine) UKR	Andriy Yarmolenko	21	3	1+14	0	3	1	3	2
9	FW	(Algeria) ALG	Saïd Benrahma	33	1	14+16	1	2+1	0	0	0
10	FW	(Argentina) ARG	Manuel Lanzini	23	1	5+12	1	2+1	0	3	0
20	FW	(England) ENG	Jarrod Bowen	40	8	30+8	8	1+1	0	0	0
30	FW	(England) ENG	Michail Antonio	27	10	24+2	10	1	0	0	0
45	FW	(Republic of Ireland) IRL	Ademipo Odubeko	2	0	0	0	0+2	0	0	0
Players who left the club on loan or permanently during the season
8	FW	(Brazil) BRA	Felipe Anderson	5	1	0+2	0	0	0	3	1
11	MF	(Scotland) SCO	Robert Snodgrass	6	2	0+3	0	0	0	3	2
19	DF	(England) ENG	Jack Wilshere	1	0	0	0	0	0	1	0
22	FW	(Ivory Coast) CIV	Sébastien Haller	19	7	10+6	3	0	0	3	4
33	MF	(Republic of Ireland) IRL	Josh Cullen	1	0	0	0	0	0	1	0
40	MF	(England) ENG	Oladapo Afolayan	1	1	0	0	0+1	1	0	0
42	DF	(England) ENG	Ajibola Alese	1	0	0	0	0	0	1	0

=== Goalscorers ===
Rank	Pos	No.	Nat	Name	Premier League	FA Cup	League Cup	Total	
1	MF	28	(Czech Republic)	Tomáš Souček	10	0	0	10	
1	FW	30	(England)	Michail Antonio	10	0	0	10	
3	MF	11	(England)	Jesse Lingard	9	0	0	9	
4	FW	20	(England)	Jarrod Bowen	8	0	0	8	
5	FW	22	(Ivory Coast)	Sébastien Haller	3	0	4	7	
6	MF	18	(Spain)	Pablo Fornals	5	1	0	6	
7	DF	15	(England)	Craig Dawson	3	1	0	4	
8	FW	7	(Ukraine)	Andriy Yarmolenko	0	1	2	3	
8	DF	21	(Italy)	Angelo Ogbonna	3	0	0	3	
8	Own goals				2	1	0	3	
11	MF	11	(Scotland)	Robert Snodgrass	0	0	2	2	
11	DF	23	(France)	Issa Diop	2	0	0	2	
11	MF	41	(England)	Declan Rice	2	0	0	2	
13	DF	4	(Paraguay)	Fabián Balbuena	1	0	0	1	
13	FW	8	(Brazil)	Felipe Anderson	0	0	1	1	
13	MF	9	(Algeria)	Saïd Benrahma	1	0	0	1	
13	FW	10	(Argentina)	Manuel Lanzini	1	0	0	1	
13	DF	24	(England)	Ryan Fredericks	1	0	0	1	
13	DF	31	(England)	Ben Johnson	1	0	0	1	
13	MF	40	(England)	Oladapo Afolayan	0	1	0	1	
13	Totals					62	5	9	76
