= Ben Johnson (footballer, born 2000) =

English footballer

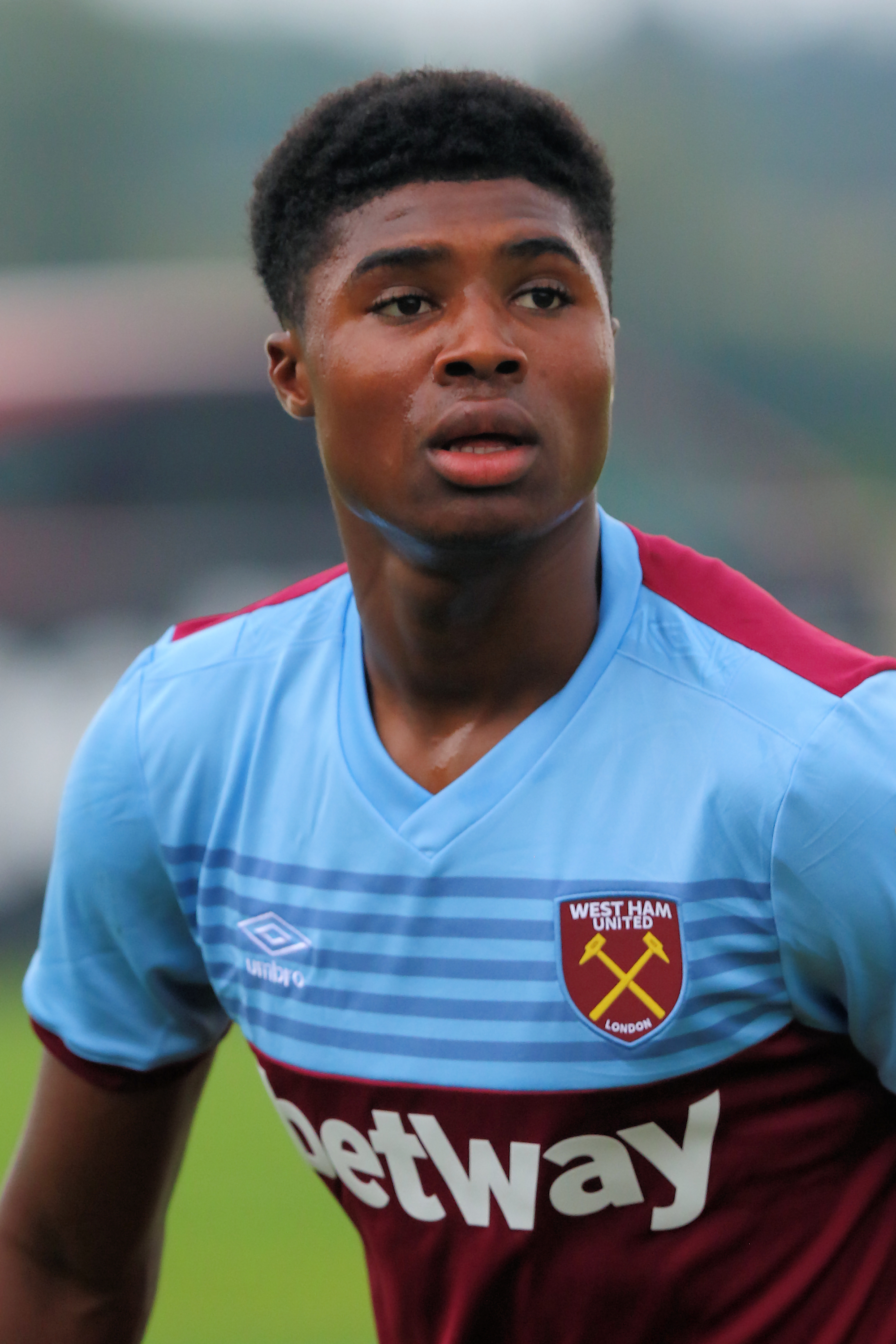
- Johnson playing for West Ham United in 2019

Personal information
- Full name: Benjamin Anthony Johnson
- Date of birth: 24 January 2000 (age 26)
- Place of birth: Waltham Forest, England
- Height: 5 ft 9 in (1.75 m)
- Position: Full back

Team information
- Current team: Stoke City (on loan from Ipswich Town)
- Number: 2

Youth career
- 2007–2018: West Ham United

Senior career*
| Years | Team | Apps | (Gls) |
| 2019–2024 | West Ham United | 69 | (2) |
| 2024– | Ipswich Town | 40 | (2) |
| 2026– | → Stoke City (loan) | 15 | (1) |

International career
| 2022–2023 | England U21 | 10 | (0) |
Medal record
Representing England
UEFA European Under-21 Championship
| Winner | 2023 Georgia–Romania |
- * Club domestic league appearances and goals as of 20:32, 21 November 2026 (UTC)

Benjamin Anthony Johnson (born 24 January 2000) is an English professional footballer who plays as a full back for EFL Championship club Stoke City, on loan from Premier League club Ipswich Town.

== Early and personal life ==
Johnson was born in Waltham Forest, Greater London. He is second cousins with former Manchester United and England full-back Paul Parker and former England and Tottenham Hotspur defender Ledley King. He attended Davenant Foundation School in Loughton, Essex. A Christian, he is a member of All Saints Church in Woodford Green.

== Club career ==
=== West Ham United ===
Johnson joined West Ham United at the age of seven. Originally an attacking winger, Johnson was converted to a full-back as his youth career progressed. He was named on the bench for West Ham's 2–1 loss at Manchester City on 3 December 2017, and he signed his first professional contract when he turned 18 in January 2018. On 27 February 2019, Johnson made his Premier League debut for West Ham, starting at left-back away at champions Manchester City in a 1–0 defeat at the City of Manchester Stadium. Two serious hamstring injuries and the form of fellow defender, Jeremy Ngakia prevented Johnson from making another appearance until 17 July 2020 when he played in West Ham's 3–1 win against Watford.

On 27 December 2020, Johnson scored his first goal for the Hammers and first professional goal, against Brighton & Hove Albion to level in a game which finished 2–2. In August 2021, Johnson won West Ham's Young Player of the Season award, after making 20 appearances for the first team in the 2020–21 season. On 20 March 2022, during a 3–1 defeat away to Tottenham, Johnson made his 50th first team appearance for West Ham, a month after having a two-year contract extension triggered by the club. In May 2022, for the second season running, Johnson won the Young Player of the Season award, newly named the Mark Noble Award.

His departure from the club at the end of his contract, after the end of the 2023–24 season was reported in June 2024. He played 109 games in all competitions for West Ham, scoring two goals, and was a member of the squad which won the 2023 Europa Conference League final.

=== Ipswich Town ===
On 1 July 2024, Johnson signed for newly promoted side Ipswich Town on a four-year contract on a free transfer. On 13 April 2025, he scored his first goal for the club in a 2–2 draw with Chelsea.

On 24 August 2026, he joined EFL Championship side Stoke City on loan for the 2026–27 season.

== International career ==
Johnson received his first international call up on 18 March 2022, named in the England U21 squad for vital UEFA European Under-21 Championship qualifiers against Andorra and Albania. He made his debut during a 3–0 victory away to the latter on 29 March 2022.

On 14 June 2023, Johnson was selected for the England squad competing in the 2023 UEFA European Under-21 Championship; a tournament the Young Lions ultimately went on to win.

== Career statistics ==
As of match played 21 November 2026

Appearances and goals by club, season and competition
| Club | Season | League | | | FA Cup | | EFL Cup | | Europe | | Other | | Total | |
| Club | Season | Division | Apps | Goals | Apps | Goals | Apps | Goals | Apps | Goals | Apps | Goals | Apps | Goals |
|---|---|---|---|---|---|---|---|---|---|---|---|---|---|---|
| West Ham United U21 | 2017–18 | — | | | — | | — | | — | | 3 (Note: Appearance(s) in EFL Trophy) | 0 | 3 | 0 |
| West Ham United U21 | 2018–19 | — | | | — | | — | | — | | 4 | 0 | 4 | 0 |
| West Ham United U21 | 2019–20 | — | | | — | | — | | — | | 1 | 0 | 1 | 0 |
| West Ham United U21 | 2020–21 | — | | | — | | — | | — | | 1 | 0 | 1 | 0 |
| West Ham United U21 | 2023–24 | — | | | — | | — | | — | | 1 | 0 | 1 | 0 |
| West Ham United U21 | Total | | | | — | | — | | — | | 10 | 0 | 10 | 0 |
| West Ham United | 2018–19 | Premier League | 1 | 0 | 0 | 0 | 0 | 0 | — | | — | | 1 | 0 |
| West Ham United | 2019–20 | Premier League | 3 | 0 | 0 | 0 | 0 | 0 | — | | — | | 3 | 0 |
| West Ham United | 2020–21 | Premier League | 14 | 1 | 3 | 0 | 3 | 0 | — | | — | | 20 | 1 |
| West Ham United | 2021–22 | Premier League | 20 | 1 | 3 | 0 | 3 | 0 | 8 (Note: Appearances in UEFA Europa League) | 0 | — | | 34 | 1 |
| West Ham United | 2022–23 | Premier League | 17 | 0 | 3 | 0 | 1 | 0 | 8 (Note: Appearances in UEFA Europa Conference League) | 0 | — | | 29 | 0 |
| West Ham United | 2023–24 | Premier League | 14 | 0 | 2 | 0 | 2 | 0 | 4 | 0 | — | | 22 | 0 |
| West Ham United | Total | | 69 | 2 | 11 | 0 | 9 | 0 | 20 | 0 | — | | 109 | 2 |
| Ipswich Town | 2024–25 | Premier League | 23 | 1 | 2 | 0 | 1 | 0 | — | | — | | 26 | 1 |
| Ipswich Town | 2025–26 | Championship | 17 | 1 | 2 | 0 | 1 | 1 | — | | — | | 20 | 2 |
| Ipswich Town | Total | | 40 | 2 | 4 | 0 | 2 | 1 | — | | — | | 6 | 3 |
| Stoke City (loan) | 2026–27 | Championship | 15 | 1 | 0 | 0 | 1 | 0 | — | | — | | 16 | 1 |
| Career total | | | 123 | 5 | 15 | 0 | 11 | 1 | 20 | 0 | 10 | 0 | 179 | 6 |

== Honours ==
West Ham United

- UEFA Europa Conference League: 2022–23

Ipswich Town

- EFL Championship runner-up: 2025–26

England U21

- UEFA European Under-21 Championship: 2023

Individual

- West Ham United Young Player of the Year: 2020–21, 2021–22
