= Tomáš Souček =

Czech footballer (born 1995)

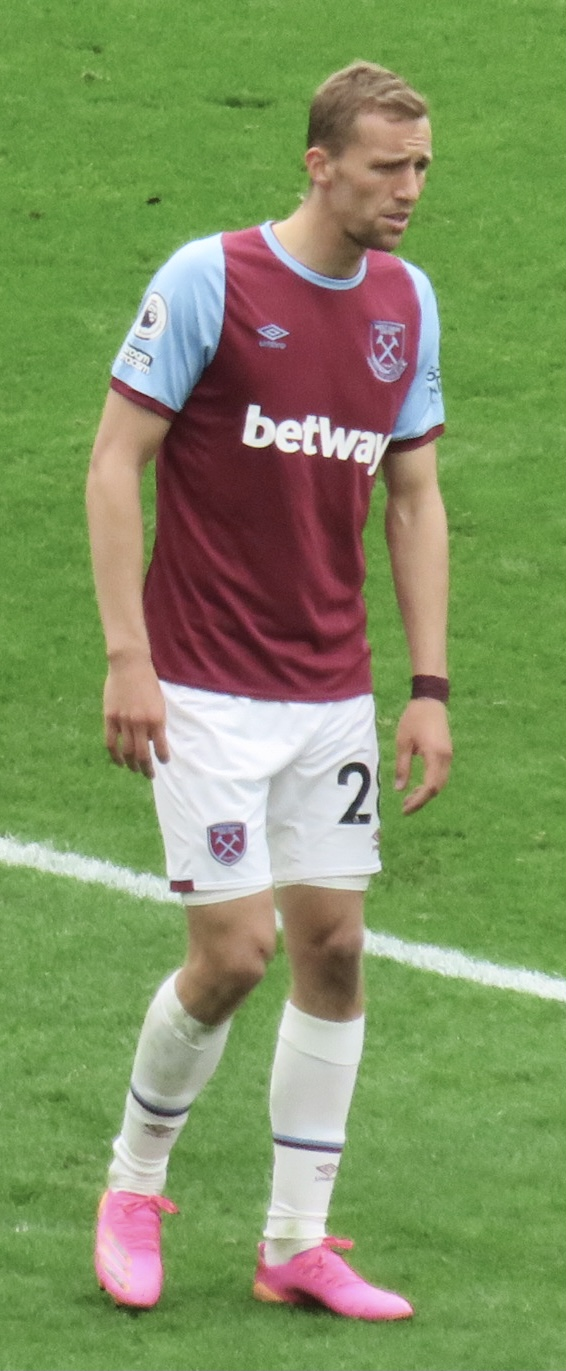
- Souček playing for West Ham United in 2021

Personal information
- Full name: Tomáš Souček
- Date of birth: 27 February 1995 (age 31)
- Place of birth: Havlíčkův Brod, Czech Republic
- Height: 1.92 m (6 ft 4 in)
- Position: Midfielder

Team information
- Current team: West Ham United
- Number: 28

Youth career
- Slovan Havlíčkův Brod
- 2005–2014: Slavia Prague

Senior career*
| Years | Team | Apps | (Gls) |
| 2014–2020 | Slavia Prague | 114 | (31) |
| 2015 | → Viktoria Žižkov (loan) | 14 | (0) |
| 2017 | → Slovan Liberec (loan) | 12 | (0) |
| 2020 | → West Ham United (loan) | 13 | (3) |
| 2020– | West Ham United | 224 | (41) |

International career^{‡}
| 2013–2014 | Czech Republic U19 | 9 | (0) |
| 2015 | Czech Republic U20 | 1 | (0) |
| 2016–2017 | Czech Republic U21 | 13 | (2) |
| 2016– | Czech Republic | 94 | (17) |
- * Club domestic league appearances and goals as of 17:02, 21 November 2026 (UTC) ‡ National team caps and goals as of 23:35, 12 November 2026 (UTC)

Tomáš Souček (Czech pronunciation: [ˈtomaːʃ ˈsoutʃɛk]; born 27 February 1995) is a Czech professional footballer who plays as a midfielder for EFL Championship club West Ham United and the Czech Republic national team.

== Club career ==
=== Slavia Prague ===
Souček joined Slavia Prague's youth team at 10 years old, after joining from hometown club Slovan Havlíčkův Brod. Slovan Havlíčkův Brod subsequently netted £1.5 million following Souček's transfer to West Ham United in 2020, covering their running costs for the next ten years. He had trials with two-second-tier clubs, Frýdek-Místek and Vlašim, but they did not want to sign him. Viktoria Žižkov’s manager, Jindřich Trpišovský, watched Souček play and was not convinced of his ability but was persuaded to take him on a loan costing nothing to the club.

Souček made his league debut on 8 March 2015 in Viktoria Žižkov's 1–2 Czech National Football League home loss against FC Fastav Zlín. After returning to Slavia, he scored his first league goal on 16 August 2015 in Slavia Prague's 4–0 home win against FC Vysočina Jihlava.

Souček broke into the Slavia Prague first team in 2015 and played 29 out of 30 league matches in the 2015–16 Czech First League for them. However, in the 2016–17 season, his position in the first team was lost due to the arrival of Michael Ngadeu-Ngadjui and Souček played only 93 minutes in three months between September and December 2016. He went on loan to Slovan Liberec during the winter transfer window, reuniting with former manager Trpišovský, who later managed Souček at Slavia Prague, following his appointment in December 2017.

On 9 May 2018, he played as Slavia Prague won the 2017–18 Czech Cup final against Jablonec.

In the 2018–19 season, he won the domestic double with Slavia Prague and was awarded the Czech First League Player of the Year award. On 17 June 2019, Souček extended his contract with Slavia Prague until 2024.

=== West Ham United ===
On 29 January 2020, Souček joined Premier League side West Ham United on an initial loan deal until the end of the 2019–20 season, with an option to make the transfer permanent in the summer. On 1 July, he scored his first goal for West Ham in a 3–2 win against Chelsea, having had a goal disallowed earlier in the same half by VAR. In West Ham's following league match, he scored again to give his team a 2–1 lead against Newcastle United, in an eventual 2–2 away draw. West Ham announced the permanent signing of Souček on 24 July 2020 on a four-year contract for a fee of around €21 million (£19 million). In August 2020, he was awarded the Czech Golden Ball.

On 1 January 2021, Souček scored the first Premier League goal of 2021 as West Ham beat Everton 1–0 at Goodison Park. During added time in a game against Fulham on 6 February, Souček was controversially sent off upon review after VAR appeared to show him strike Aleksandar Mitrović in the face; referee Mike Dean's decision was criticised by many of Souček's teammates, manager David Moyes and a number of pundits who protested Souček's innocence. West Ham launched an appeal to have the decision overturned in the aftermath. On 8 February, the red card was rescinded. He finished the 2020–21 season as West Ham's joint-top scorer, along with Michail Antonio, both having scored ten goals. Souček's exploits during the 2020–21 season won him the Hammer of the Year award.

On 7 June 2023, Souček played in the 2023 UEFA Europa Conference League final, against Fiorentina in Prague. West Ham won their first trophy in 43 years with a 2–1 victory. On 1 January 2024, he signed a new contract with the club until 2027.

On 13 September 2025, Souček was sent-off in the 54th minute receiving a straight red card for a bad lunging foul on João Palhinha in their 3–0 home defeat to Tottenham Hotspur. West Ham continued to struggle in 3 games (Crystal Palace, Everton and Arsenal) in which he was suspended for.

On 10 February 2026, Souček scored in West Ham's 1–1 draw with Manchester United, his 39th Premier League goal, surpassing Patrik Berger as the highest scoring Czech in Premier League history.

== International career ==
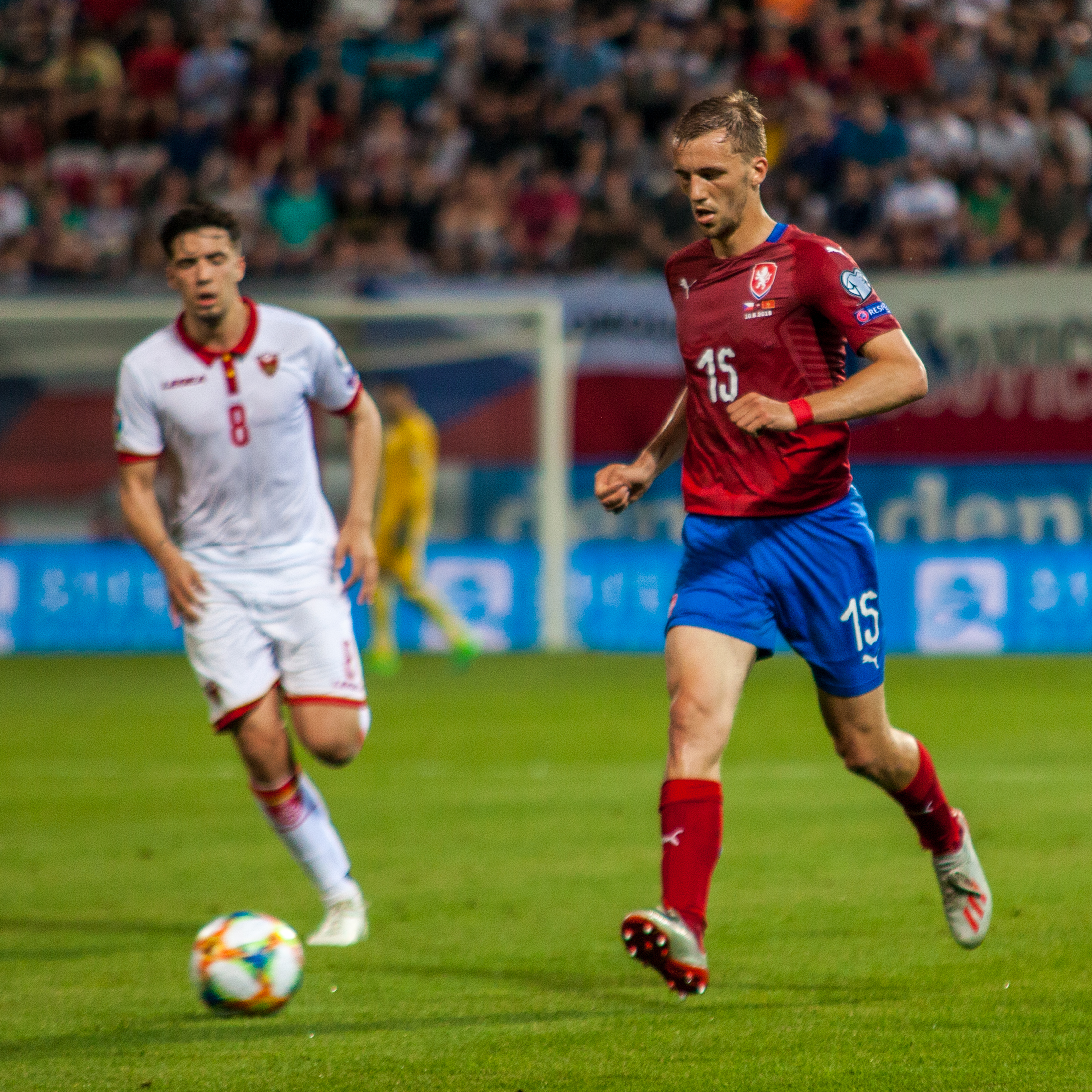
Souček with the Czech Republic in 2019.

Souček appeared in all three matches of the Czech Republic under-21 team in the 2017 UEFA Under-21 Championship. After representing the Czech Republic in several youth categories, Souček debuted for the senior team on 15 November 2016 in a friendly match against Denmark. He made his competitive debut on 10 June 2017, in Czech Republic's 1–1 away draw against Norway in a 2018 World Cup qualifier. On 24 March 2021, Souček scored a hat-trick in a 6–2 World Cup qualifying win against Estonia. He was a member of the Czech Republic squad for Euro 2020 where they were eliminated in the quarter-finals by Denmark. Following the tournament, Souček was confirmed as the new captain of the Czech Republic, after Vladimír Darida's retirement from international football.

In May 2024, Souček was named as a member of the Czech Republic squad for Euro 2024.

In 2025, Souček was selected for 2026 World Cup qualification. On 9 June against Croatia, his goal put the match level at 1–1, yet Czechia would go on to lose 5–1. Souček's second goal of the tournament was the fifth of six goals his team would score in a 6–0 victory against Gibraltar on 17 November. The Czechs ultimately finished second in their group, allowing them to advance to the second qualifying round. Souček was later stripped of captaincy, accused of ignoring Czech fans after the victory against Gibraltar.

On 31 May 2026, Souček was selected to the 26-man squad for the 2026 FIFA World Cup.

== Style of play ==
Souček has built a reputation as an energetic box-to-box midfielder with both defensive and attacking qualities. He is also known for his strong physical presence thanks to his 1.92 m (6 ft 4 in) frame. Souček was likened to Marouane Fellaini by José Mourinho due to his heading ability from set-pieces.

== Awards ==
On 18 March 2025 Souček was named Czech Footballer of the Year for the fourth time, equalling Pavel Nedvěd's record and trailing only Petr Čech's nine awards. In 2024, Souček scored six goals for West Ham, and played 11 matches for the national team, scoring twice. He was instrumental in leading the Czechs to the elite division of the UEFA Nations League. Reflecting on his achievements, Souček expressed gratitude for being considered a role model and emphasised his ambition to continue scoring and inspiring young players.

== Personal life ==
In November 2025, Souček's autobiography, titled Suk, was published detailing his personal struggles with insomnia and depression during his career.

== Career statistics ==
=== Club ===
As of match played 31 October 2026

Appearances and goals by club, season and competition
| Club | Season | League | | | National cup (Note: Includes Czech Cup, FA Cup) | | League cup (Note: Includes EFL Cup) | | Europe | | Other | | Total | |
| Club | Season | Division | Apps | Goals | Apps | Goals | Apps | Goals | Apps | Goals | Apps | Goals | Apps | Goals |
|---|---|---|---|---|---|---|---|---|---|---|---|---|---|---|
| Slavia Prague | 2015–16 | Czech First League | 29 | 7 | 2 | 0 | — | | — | | — | | 31 | 7 |
| Slavia Prague | 2016–17 | Czech First League | 7 | 0 | 1 | 0 | — | | 5 (Note: Appearances in UEFA Europa League) | 0 | — | | 13 | 0 |
| Slavia Prague | 2017–18 | Czech First League | 27 | 3 | 4 | 0 | — | | 8 (Note: Three appearances in UEFA Champions League, five appearances in UEFA Europa League) | 0 | — | | 39 | 3 |
| Slavia Prague | 2018–19 | Czech First League | 34 | 13 | 2 | 3 | — | | 13 (Note: Two appearances in UEFA Champions League, eleven appearances and two goals in UEFA Europa League) | 2 | — | | 49 | 18 |
| Slavia Prague | 2019–20 | Czech First League | 17 | 8 | 0 | 0 | — | | 8 (Note: Appearances in UEFA Champions League) | 2 | 1 (Note: Appearance in Czechoslovak Supercup) | 2 | 26 | 12 |
| Slavia Prague | Total | | 114 | 31 | 9 | 3 | — | | 34 | 4 | 1 | 2 | 158 | 40 |
| Viktoria Žižkov (loan) | 2014–15 | Czech Second League | 14 | 0 | 0 | 0 | — | | — | | — | | 14 | 0 |
| Slovan Liberec (loan) | 2016–17 | Czech First League | 12 | 0 | 1 | 0 | — | | — | | — | | 13 | 0 |
| West Ham United (loan) | 2019–20 | Premier League | 13 | 3 | — | | — | | — | | — | | 13 | 3 |
| West Ham United | 2020–21 | Premier League | 38 | 10 | 3 | 0 | 0 | 0 | — | | — | | 41 | 10 |
| West Ham United | 2021–22 | Premier League | 35 | 5 | 3 | 0 | 2 | 0 | 11 | 1 | — | | 51 | 6 |
| West Ham United | 2022–23 | Premier League | 36 | 2 | 3 | 0 | 0 | 0 | 11 (Note: Appearances in UEFA Europa Conference League) | 1 | — | | 50 | 3 |
| West Ham United | 2023–24 | Premier League | 37 | 7 | 2 | 0 | 3 | 1 | 10 | 2 | — | | 52 | 10 |
| West Ham United | 2024–25 | Premier League | 35 | 9 | 1 | 0 | 2 | 0 | — | | — | | 38 | 9 |
| West Ham United | 2025–26 | Premier League | 35 | 5 | 3 | 0 | 1 | 1 | — | | — | | 39 | 6 |
| West Ham United | 2026–27 | Championship | 5 | 3 | 0 | 0 | 0 | 0 | — | | — | | 5 | 3 |
| West Ham United | Total | | 234 | 44 | 15 | 0 | 8 | 2 | 32 | 4 | — | | 289 | 50 |
| Career total | | | 374 | 75 | 25 | 3 | 8 | 2 | 66 | 8 | 1 | 2 | 474 | 90 |

=== International ===
As of match played 12 November 2026

Appearances and goals by national team and year
| National team | Year | Apps | Goals |
|---|---|---|---|
| Czech Republic | 2016 | 1 | 0 |
| Czech Republic | 2017 | 7 | 1 |
| Czech Republic | 2018 | 8 | 1 |
| Czech Republic | 2019 | 9 | 1 |
| Czech Republic | 2020 | 5 | 1 |
| Czech Republic | 2021 | 16 | 4 |
| Czech Republic | 2022 | 10 | 1 |
| Czech Republic | 2023 | 10 | 3 |
| Czech Republic | 2024 | 11 | 2 |
| Czech Republic | 2025 | 10 | 3 |
| Czech Republic | 2026 | 7 | 0 |
| Total | | 94 | 17 |

Scores and results list Czech Republic's goal tally first, score column indicates score after each Souček goal.

List of international goals scored by Tomáš Souček
| No. | Date | Venue | Opponent | Score | Result | Competition |
|---|---|---|---|---|---|---|
| 1 | 8 November 2017 | Abdullah bin Khalifa Stadium, Doha, Qatar | Iceland | 1–0 | 2–1 | Friendly |
| 2 | 10 September 2018 | Rostov Arena, Rostov-on-Don, Russia | Russia | 1–3 | 1–5 | Friendly |
| 3 | 10 September 2019 | Podgorica City Stadium, Podgorica, Montenegro | Montenegro | 1–0 | 3–0 | UEFA Euro 2020 qualifying |
| 4 | 18 November 2020 | Doosan Arena, Plzeň, Czech Republic | Slovakia | 1–0 | 2–0 | 2020–21 UEFA Nations League B |
| 5 | 24 March 2021 | Arena Lublin, Lublin, Poland | Estonia | 3–1 | 6–2 | 2022 FIFA World Cup qualification |
| 6 | 24 March 2021 | Arena Lublin, Lublin, Poland | Estonia | 4–1 | 6–2 | 2022 FIFA World Cup qualification |
| 7 | 24 March 2021 | Arena Lublin, Lublin, Poland | Estonia | 5–1 | 6–2 | 2022 FIFA World Cup qualification |
| 8 | 11 November 2021 | Andrův stadion, Olomouc, Czech Republic | Kuwait | 4–0 | 7–0 | Friendly |
| 9 | 29 March 2022 | Cardiff City Stadium, Cardiff, Wales | Wales | 1–0 | 1–1 | Friendly |
| 10 | 15 October 2023 | Doosan Arena, Plzeň, Czechia | Faroe Islands | 1–0 | 1–0 | UEFA Euro 2024 qualifying |
| 11 | 17 November 2023 | Kazimierz Górski National Stadium, Warsaw, Poland | Poland | 1–1 | 1–1 | UEFA Euro 2024 qualifying |
| 12 | 20 November 2023 | Andrův stadion, Olomouc, Czech Republic | Moldova | 3–0 | 3–0 | UEFA Euro 2024 qualifying |
| 13 | 26 June 2024 | Volksparkstadion, Hamburg, Germany | Turkey | 1–1 | 1–2 | UEFA Euro 2024 |
| 14 | 10 September 2024 | Fortuna Arena, Prague, Czech Republic | Ukraine | 3–1 | 3–2 | 2024–25 UEFA Nations League B |
| 15 | 9 June 2025 | Opus Arena, Osijek, Croatia | Croatia | 1–1 | 1–5 | 2026 FIFA World Cup qualification |
| 16 | 13 November 2025 | Městský stadion, Karviná, Czech Republic | San Marino | 1–0 | 1–0 | Friendly |
| 17 | 17 November 2025 | Andrův stadion, Olomouc, Czech Republic | Gibraltar | 5–0 | 6–0 | 2026 FIFA World Cup qualification |

== Honours ==
Slavia Prague

- Czech First League: 2016–17, 2018–19
- Czech Cup: 2017–18, 2018–19
- Czechoslovak Supercup: 2019

West Ham United

- UEFA Europa Conference League: 2022–23

Czech Republic

- China Cup bronze: 2018

Individual

- Czech First League Best Midfielder of the Season: 2018–19
- Czech Footballer of the Year: 2019, 2020, 2023, 2024
- Golden Ball (Czech Republic): 2020, 2021, 2023, 2024
- West Ham United Hammer of the Year: 2020–21
- Silver Medal of Jan Masaryk: 2021
