= Vladimír Coufal =

Czech footballer (born 1992)

- Coufal with West Ham United in 2023

Personal information
- Full name: Vladimír Coufal
- Date of birth: 22 August 1992 (age 34)
- Place of birth: Ludgeřovice, Czechoslovakia
- Height: 1.74 m (5 ft 9 in)
- Position: Right-back

Team information
- Current team: TSG Hoffenheim
- Number: 34

Youth career
- Baník Ostrava

Senior career*
Years	Team	Apps	(Gls)
2009–2010	Bílovec		
2010–2012	Hlučín	14	(0)
2012	→ Opava (loan)	13	(1)
2012–2018	Slovan Liberec	118	(3)
2018–2020	Slavia Prague	65	(6)
2020–2025	West Ham United	147	(0)
2025–	TSG Hoffenheim	41	(1)

International career^{‡}
2014	Czech Republic U21	2	(0)
2017–	Czech Republic	69	(2)
- * Club domestic league appearances and goals as of 17:30, 25 October 2026 (UTC) ‡ National team caps and goals as of 23:50, 15 November 2026 (UTC)

Vladimír Coufal (Czech pronunciation: [ˈvlaɟɪmiːr ˈtsoufal]; born 22 August 1992) is a Czech professional footballer who plays as a right-back for Bundesliga club TSG Hoffenheim and the Czech Republic national team.

Coufal previously played for Bílovec, Hlučín, Opava, Slovan Liberec, Slavia Prague and West Ham United, winning the UEFA Europa Conference League with the latter in 2023, before moving to German side Hoffenheim in 2025.

Coufal made his senior debut for the Czech Republic in November 2017, and has gone on to make over 60 appearances, scoring two goals, and was included in the squads for two UEFA European Championships (2020 and 2024) and one FIFA World Cup (2026).

== Club career ==
Coufal began his career at local club Baník Ostrava, playing in the club's academy, before being released at the age of 17 as he was considered to be too small. In 2009, following his release from Baník Ostrava, Coufal joined amateur club ŠSK Bílovec. He believed Baník had destroyed his opportunity to become a professional footballer and described his time with Bílovec as playing "with 40-year-old men. These guys played for sausages and beer after the game, just to drink after work".

=== Hlučín ===
Coufal began his professional career with Hlučín, making his debut against Dukla Prague in September 2010 in 2. Liga just after his 18th birthday. During the 2010–11 season, Coufal made 14 appearances for the club.

==== Loan to Opava ====
Coufal spent the 2011–12 season on loan with 2. Liga club Opava where he made 13 appearances and scored one goal for the club.

=== Slovan Liberec ===
After impressing in the second division with Hlučín and Opava, Coufal was signed by Czech First League club Slovan Liberec in 2012, following a trial with Sparta Prague, who saw Coufal as a replacement for the outgoing Ondřej Kušnír, who had joined Liberec himself in the summer of 2012. Despite playing for Sparta Prague in a pre-season friendly against Viktoria Žižkov, Sparta opted to sign Pablo Gil over Coufal.

During his first season with Liberec, Coufal played in ten league games. In his second season with the team, the 2013–14 season, Coufal became a regular for the team featuring in 26 matches. Over the next three seasons, Coufal played consistently, making 88 appearances all competitions.

Coufal's last season for Liberec was arguably his most impressive as he made 33 appearances across all competitions, scoring two goals. These performances also earned him a call up and debut to the Czech national team. Coufal was with Slovan Liberec for six seasons, making more than 150 appearances across all competitions, and playing in the team which won the Czech Cup in 2015. During Coufal's time at Liberec, he was made club captain.

=== Slavia Prague ===
Coufal's impressive displays at Slovan Liberec earned him a move to one of the Czech Republic's largest clubs, Slavia Prague, following protracted interest from rivals Sparta Prague. On 1 July 2018, Coufal joined Slavia Prague on a three-year contract, for a reported fee of 18 million Kč. Upon his move to Slavia Prague, Coufal was reunited with manager Jindřich Trpišovský, who he had previously played under at Slovan Liberec.

During the 2018–19 season, Coufal made 39 appearances for Slavia Prague, scoring 4 goals and helping lead the team to the Czech First League title. The next season, during the 2019–20 campaign, he made 42 appearances and scored three goals in a season that was suspended for two months due to the COVID-19 pandemic. During this season, Coufal and Slavia Prague retained the Czech First League title. During the 2020–21 season, Coufal made a final seven appearances for Slavia Prague before transferring to West Ham United and the Premier League, playing his last game for the club in a 4–1 UEFA Champions League qualification loss against Danish club Midtjylland.

=== West Ham United ===
On 2 October 2020, Coufal joined West Ham United for a fee of £5.4 million, signing a three-year deal, reuniting with fellow Czech and former Slavia Prague teammate Tomáš Souček, following interest from fellow Premier League clubs Brighton & Hove Albion and Southampton. He made his West Ham debut in a 3–0 win against Leicester City on 4 October 2020. Coufal created seven assists for West Ham during his first season in English football, one behind Aaron Cresswell. The pair created more assists than any other Premier League full-back duo in the 2020–21 season. Coufal finished runner-up in West Ham's Hammer of the Year award for the 2020–21 season, behind compatriot Souček.

He achieved the UEFA Europa Conference League title with his club, featuring in a 2–1 victory over Fiorentina in the final.

On 9 May 2025, it was announced that Coufal would leave West Ham at the end of the 2024–25 season. In total, he made 180 appearances for West Ham in five years.

=== TSG Hoffenheim ===
On 5 August 2025, Coufal signed a one-year contract with TSG Hoffenheim in Germany as a free agent. He scored his first goal for Hoffenheim during the 4–1 loss against Bayern Munich on 20 September.

== International career ==
In 2014, Coufal made two appearances for the Czech Republic under-21 side. He later debuted for the senior Czech Republic squad on 11 November 2017 in a friendly against Qatar.

On 4 September 2020, he scored his first goal for the Czech Republic, scoring the opening goal in a 3–1 UEFA Nations League group game against neighbours Slovakia.

In May 2021, Coufal was named in the Czech Republic squad alongside West Ham teammate Tomáš Souček for the postponed UEFA Euro 2020. They were later eliminated in the quarter-finals by Denmark on 3 July in a 2–1 loss. On 16 November, he served as captain for the first time, in a 2–0 World Cup qualification game against Estonia.

On 19 November 2023, Coufal along with Jakub Brabec and Jan Kuchta had been kicked out of the Czech Republic training camp after they allegedly went out clubbing two days before the UEFA Euro 2024 qualifier match against Moldova.

In May 2024, he was named to the Czech squad for UEFA Euro 2024.

On 31 May 2026, Coufal was selected in the 26-man squad for the 2026 FIFA World Cup.

== Personal life ==
Coufal was born in the village of Ludgeřovice. Coufal's mother, Alena Dřevjaná, represented the Czechoslovak gymnastic team at the 1988 Summer Olympics. Coufal's siblings, Petr and Jana, are both figure skaters.

== Career statistics ==
=== Club ===
As of match played 28 October 2026

Appearances and goals by club, season and competition
Club	Season	League			National cup (Note: Includes Czech Cup, FA Cup, DFB-Pokal)		League cup (Note: Includes EFL Cup)		Europe		Other		Total	
Club	Season	Division	Apps	Goals	Apps	Goals	Apps	Goals	Apps	Goals	Apps	Goals	Apps	Goals
Hlučín	2010–11	Czech 2. Liga	14	0	0	0	—		—		—		14	0
Opava (loan)	2011–12	Czech 2. Liga	13	1	0	0	—		—		—		13	1
Slovan Liberec	2012–13	Czech First League	10	0	1	0	—		—		—		11	0
Slovan Liberec	2013–14	Czech First League	21	0	1	0	—		4 (Note: Appearances in UEFA Europa League)	0	—		26	0
Slovan Liberec	2014–15	Czech First League	13	0	3	0	—		3	0	—		19	0
Slovan Liberec	2015–16	Czech First League	27	1	4	0	—		10	1	1 (Note: Appearance in Czech-Slovak Supercup)	0	42	2
Slovan Liberec	2016–17	Czech First League	17	0	0	0	—		10	2	—		27	2
Slovan Liberec	2017–18	Czech First League	30	2	3	0	—		—		—		33	2
Slovan Liberec	Total		118	3	12	0	0	0	27	3	1	0	158	6
Slavia Prague	2018–19	Czech First League	28	3	0	0	—		11 (Note: Two appearances in UEFA Champions League, nine appearances one goal in UEFA Europa League)	1	—		39	4
Slavia Prague	2019–20	Czech First League	32	3	1	0	—		8 (Note: Appearances in UEFA Champions League)	0	1	0	42	3
Slavia Prague	2020–21	Czech First League	5	0	0	0	—		2	0	—		7	0
Slavia Prague	Total		65	6	1	0	0	0	21	1	1	0	88	7
West Ham United	2020–21	Premier League	34	0	2	0	0	0	—		—		36	0
West Ham United	2021–22	Premier League	28	0	0	0	2	0	4	0	—		34	0
West Ham United	2022–23	Premier League	27	0	0	0	1	0	10 (Note: Appearances in UEFA Europa Conference League)	0	—		38	0
West Ham United	2023–24	Premier League	36	0	2	0	2	0	7	0	—		47	0
West Ham United	2024–25	Premier League	22	0	1	0	2	0	—		—		25	0
West Ham United	Total		147	0	5	0	7	0	21	0	0	0	180	0
TSG Hoffenheim	2025–26	Bundesliga	34	1	1	0	—		—		—		35	1
TSG Hoffenheim	2026–27	Bundesliga	7	0	2	0	—		3	0	—		12	0
TSG Hoffenheim	Total		41	1	3	0	0	0	3	0	0	0	47	1
Career total			398	11	21	0	7	0	72	4	2	0	500	15

=== International ===
As of match played 15 November 2026

Appearances and goals by national team and year
National team	Year	Apps	Goals
Czech Republic	2017	1	0
Czech Republic	2018	2	0
Czech Republic	2019	4	0
Czech Republic	2020	5	1
Czech Republic	2021	14	0
Czech Republic	2022	8	0
Czech Republic	2023	6	0
Czech Republic	2024	11	0
Czech Republic	2025	8	1
Czech Republic	2026	10	0
Total		69	2

Scores and results list the Czech Republic's goal tally first, score column indicates score after each Coufal goal.

List of international goals scored by Vladimír Coufal
No.	Date	Venue	Opponent	Score	Result	Competition
1	4 September 2020	Tehelné pole, Bratislava, Slovakia	Slovakia	1–0	3–1	2020–21 UEFA Nations League B
2	17 November 2025	Andrův stadion, Olomouc, Czech Republic	Gibraltar	3–0	6–0	2026 FIFA World Cup qualification

== Honours ==
Slovan Liberec

- Czech Cup: 2014–15

Slavia Prague

- Czech First League: 2018–19, 2019–20, 2020–21
- Czech Cup: 2018–19
- Czechoslovak Supercup: 2019

West Ham United

- UEFA Europa Conference League: 2022–23

Individual

- Silver Medal of Jan Masaryk: 2021
