= Łukasz Fabiański =

Polish footballer (born 1985)

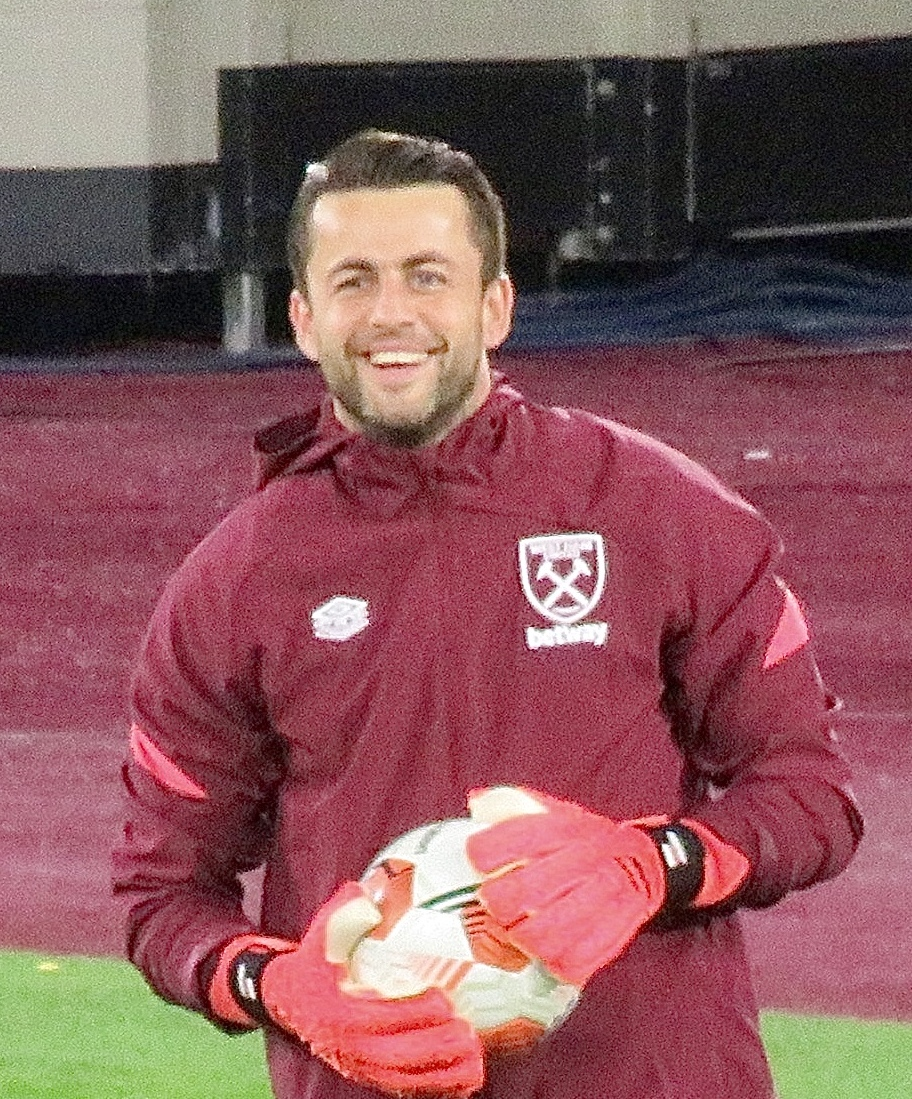
- Fabiański with West Ham United in 2021

Personal information
- Full name: Łukasz Marek Fabiański
- Date of birth: 18 April 1985 (age 41)
- Place of birth: Kostrzyn nad Odrą, Gorzów Wielkopolski Voivodeship, Poland
- Height: 1.90 m (6 ft 3 in)
- Position: Goalkeeper

Youth career
- 1999–2000: Polonia Słubice
- 2000–2001: MSP Szamotuły
- 2001–2002: Lubuszanin Drezdenko
- 2002–2003: Sparta Brodnica
- 2003–2004: Mieszko Gniezno
- 2004–2005: Lech Poznań

Senior career*
Years	Team	Apps	(Gls)
2004–2005	Lech Poznań	0	(0)
2005–2007	Legia Warsaw	53	(0)
2007–2014	Arsenal	32	(0)
2014–2018	Swansea City	149	(0)
2018–2025	West Ham United	195	(0)
2025–2026	West Ham United	0	(0)
Total		429	(0)

International career
2002	Poland U17	3	(0)
2004	Poland U19	3	(0)
2006	Poland U20	1	(0)
2005	Poland U21	6	(0)
2006–2021	Poland	57	(0)
- * Club domestic league appearances and goals

Łukasz Marek Fabiański (born 18 April 1985) is a Polish former professional footballer who played as a goalkeeper.

Having begun his career at Legia Warsaw, Fabiański joined Arsenal for £2.1 million in 2007, and was mainly used as back-up, but played as the club won the 2014 FA Cup final. On the expiration of his contract in 2014, he joined Swansea City, and played 150 total matches in four years. He then signed for West Ham United for £7 million. After leaving the club in June 2025, he briefly returned as a free agent in September, where he didn't appear in any games, and subsequently left once again in 2026. He retired from professional football in July 2026.

A full international for Poland, Fabiański was included in the squads for the 2006 FIFA World Cup, UEFA Euro 2008, Euro 2016, the 2018 FIFA World Cup and Euro 2020. He was named the Polish Footballer of the Year in 2018. He retired from the national team in August 2021, having earned 57 caps across fifteen years.

== Club career ==
=== Early career ===
Fabiański was born in Kostrzyn nad Odrą, Lubusz Land. After starting his career with Polonia Słubice, Fabiański joined the noted independent football academy MSP Szamotuły at age 14, where he honed his footballing skills. Fabiański then was signed in the 2004–05 season by Lech Poznań.

=== Legia Warsaw ===
In the winter of 2005, Fabiański was signed by Legia Warsaw, where he competed with Artur Boruc for a place in the team. After Boruc was sold to Celtic, Fabiański took over as starting goalkeeper on 24 July 2005 in a match against Arka Gdynia, which ended 0–0. The following season, he helped Legia win the 2005–06 Ekstraklasa. He started all 30 matches of the campaign, in which he conceded 17 goals.

In the 2005–06 and 2006–07 seasons, his performances led to him being awarded the "Football Oscar" for the best goalkeeper in the Ekstraklasa.

=== Arsenal ===
On 8 May 2007, Fabiański underwent medical tests in London after Arsenal agreed a transfer fee with Legia Warsaw worth approximately £2.1 million. The move was confirmed on 11 May 2007 by Arsenal manager Arsène Wenger. Fabiański formally signed for Arsenal on 26 May with a long-term contract. He made his debut for the club in a 2–0 League Cup win over Newcastle United on 25 September 2007. His league debut followed later that season against Derby County.

In Fabiański's early Arsenal career, two of his most notable appearances came in the 5–1 defeat to rivals Tottenham Hotspur in the 2007–08 League Cup semi-final and the first leg of the 2009–10 UEFA Champions League second round match with Porto. Fabiański received criticism for conceding soft goals in the Porto match as he scored an own goal and was blamed for the second goal after picking up a backpass from Sol Campbell, with Porto scoring from the resulting free-kick. In January 2010, Arsène Wenger stated that Łukasz Fabiański could become one of the best goalkeepers in the Premier League.

Fabiański played the last four matches for Arsenal in the 2009–10 season after top-choice goalkeeper Manuel Almunia suffered a wrist injury. He was criticised for conceding soft goals in the defeats to Wigan Athletic and Blackburn Rovers, but kept clean sheets in the matches at home to Manchester City and Fulham.

==== 2010–11 season ====
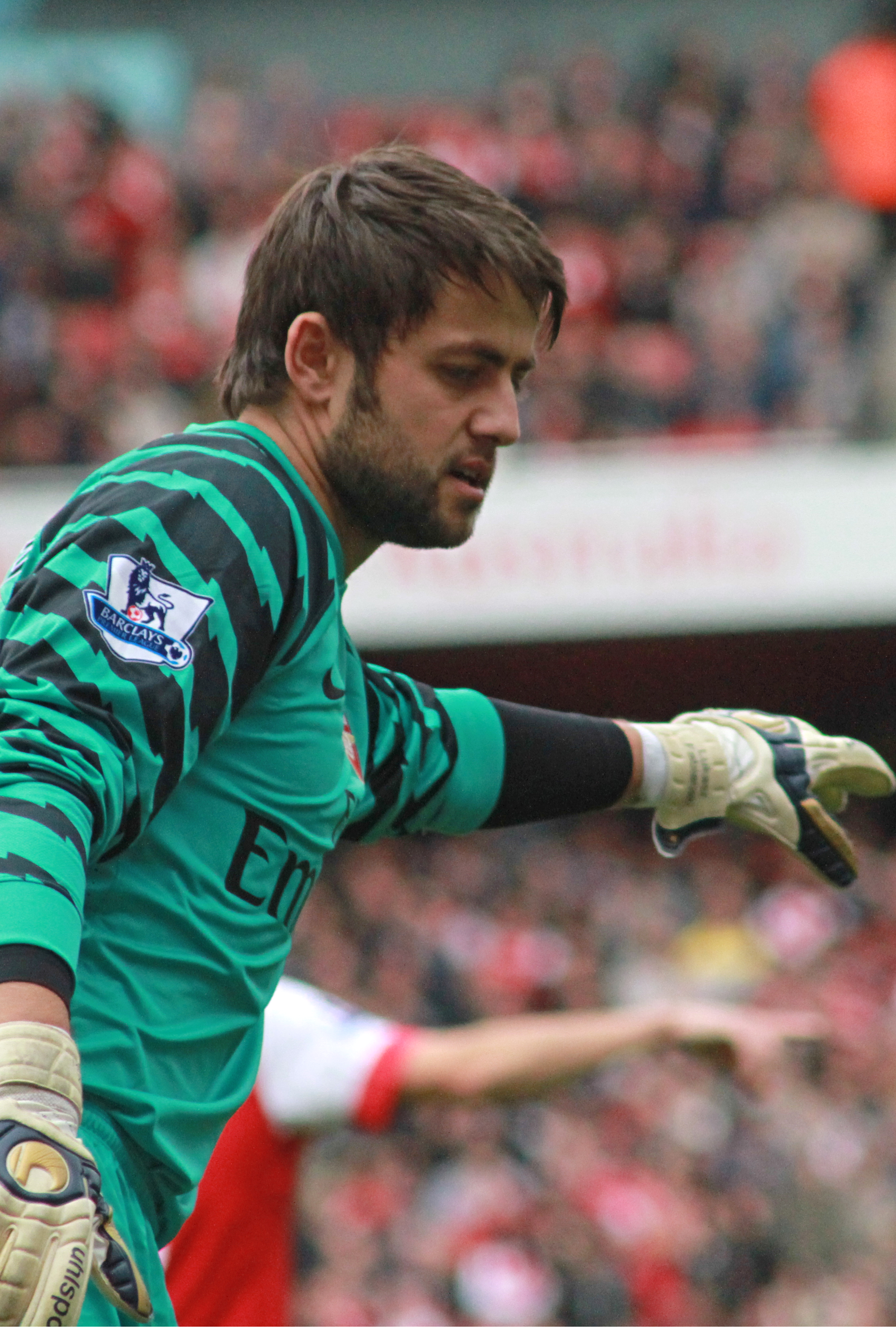
Fabiański playing for Arsenal in 2010

Fabiański started the 2010–11 season as Arsenal's second-choice goalkeeper. On 21 September 2010, he made his first start of the season in a League Cup match against neighbours Tottenham Hotspur at White Hart Lane, which Arsenal won 4–1 after extra time. Fabiański almost cost the match for Arsenal as he failed to stop Robbie Keane's long-range effort, despite getting a hand to the shot. After the match, he revealed he was disappointed. He had a solid match in his second match of the season replacing the injured Manuel Almunia one week later in a UEFA Champions League 3–1 away win against Partizan.

He saved Cléo's second penalty of the match in the second half to deny Partizan a lifeline. He later turned Ivica Iliev's effort around the post from point-blank range just before the final whistle. Arsène Wenger later commented that Fabiański had a "faultless" match and they finally saw the player who they usually see in training. He kept his first clean sheet in a win over Manchester City, where he made many saves in a match that ended 3–0. He was later named man of the match on an Arsenal.com poll after a brilliant display to keep Arsenal in the match. After the City match, Wenger admitted he could well become the club's number one goalkeeper after impressive displays in the matches since the Partizan match.

On 7 November 2010, Fabiański was widely criticised for an error that lead to the only goal as Arsenal lost at home to Newcastle United. However, he produced a strong display to keep a clean sheet in the next Premier League match, against Wolverhampton Wanderers, in which he managed to prevent a draw with a last-minute save, and then initiating a counter-attack with a long throw of the ball that led to another Arsenal goal. After the Wolves match, Arsenal played Everton, where Fabiański received the man of the match award from Sky Sports.

Fabiański was injured for Arsenal's crucial match with Manchester United but returned for the equally important match with London rivals Chelsea, making many crucial saves in helping Arsenal to win 3–1. On 5 January 2011, he suffered a season-ending shoulder injury as he was warming up with the help of Wojciech Szczęsny, which ruled him out for the remainder of the 2010–11 season. During this period, Szczęsny established himself as Arsenal's first choice goalkeeper ahead of his Polish compatriot.

==== 2011–12 season ====
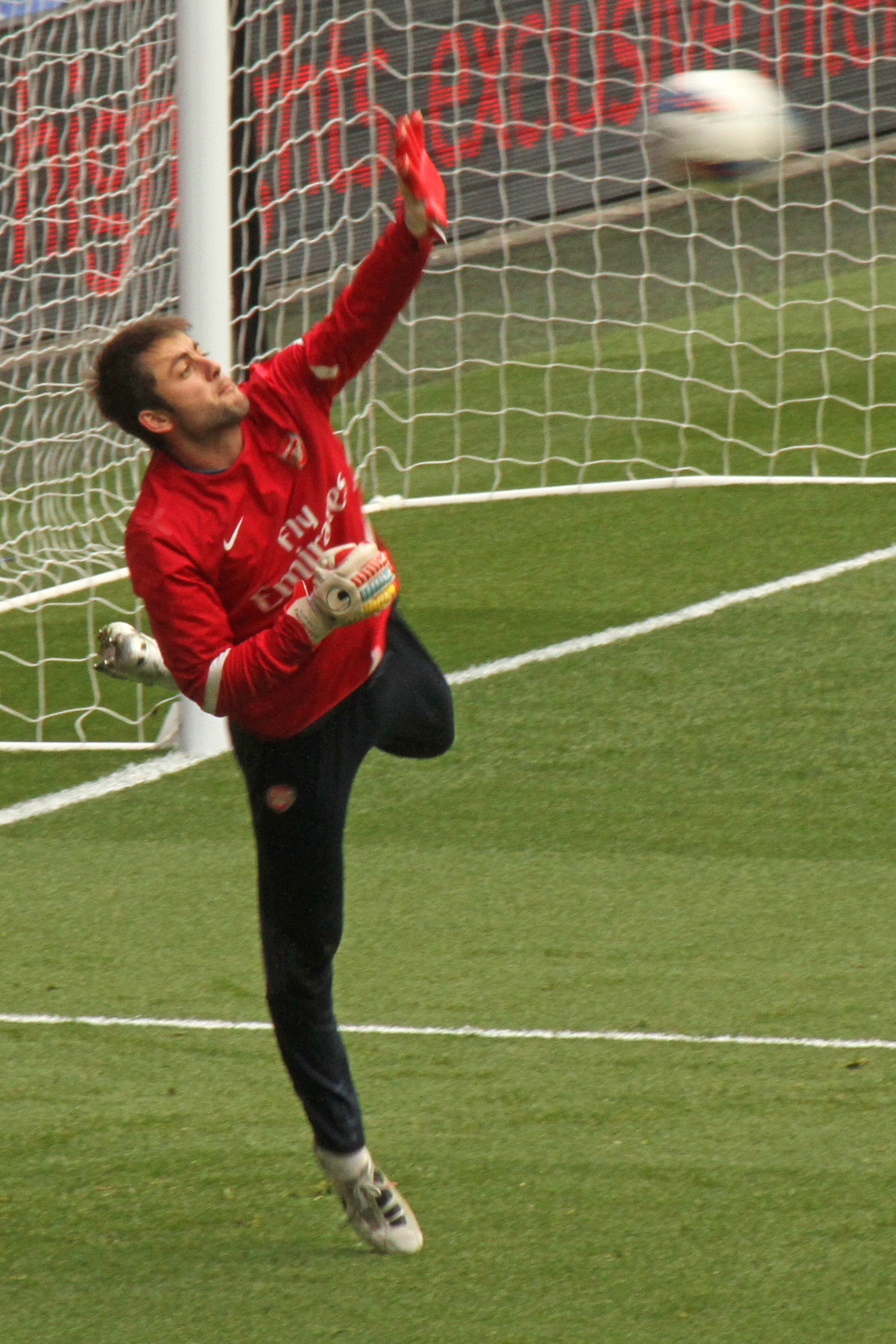
Fabiański warming up before a match against Chelsea on 21 April 2012

Fabiański spent the 2011–12 season as backup to Wojciech Szczęsny, making his first appearance against Shrewsbury Town in the League Cup. On 6 December 2011, Fabiański was selected to start in Arsenal's UEFA Champions League group stage match against Olympiacos, but was substituted out after 25 minutes following a knee injury.

==== 2012–13 season ====
Injuries limited Fabiański's appearances during the 2012–13 season, where he made only four Premier League appearances as back-up to Wojciech Szczęsny. In March 2013, after Szczęsny was dropped, Fabiański started in goal in the second-leg of Arsenal's UEFA Champions League tie against Bayern Munich. He kept a clean sheet as Arsenal won 2–0 and retained his place in the team to make his first Premier League start of the season away against Swansea City on 16 March 2013, again keeping a clean sheet in a 2–0 win. Fabiański started in Arsenal's next three league matches against Reading, West Bromwich Albion and Norwich City. However, an injury sustained in the match against Norwich by Fabiański allowed Szczęsny to return to the starting line-up and reclaim his position as first-choice goalkeeper.

==== 2013–14 season ====
During the 2013–14 season, Fabiański was used as Arsenal's starting goalkeeper in FA Cup and League Cup matches, with Szczęsny remaining first-choice in Premier League and UEFA Champions League matches.

On 19 February 2014, Fabiański came on as a substitute in the 37th minute of a 2–0 Champions League home defeat against Bayern Munich, after Szczęsny was sent off for a foul on Arjen Robben. With Szczęsny suspended, Fabiański was in the starting line-up for the second leg and saved a late penalty from Bayern's Thomas Müller.

On 12 April, Fabiański saved penalties from Gary Caldwell and Jack Collison in an FA Cup semi-final shootout victory over Wigan Athletic. He made his only Premier League appearance of the season in the last match on 11 May, keeping a clean sheet in a 2–0 away win that caused his opponents Norwich City to be relegated. Six days later, Fabiański started for Arsenal in the 2014 FA Cup Final as they defeated Hull City 3–2 after extra time at Wembley Stadium.

=== Swansea City ===
On 29 May 2014, it was announced that Fabiański would join fellow Premier League side Swansea City on a free transfer when his Arsenal contract expired on 1 July. He said of the transfer, "The main reason I came to Swansea was because I want to be the number one goalkeeper." He made his competitive debut for the club on 16 August, a 2–1 win against Manchester United at Old Trafford in the first match of the Premier League season.

On 7 December 2014, Fabiański was sent off in Swansea's 1–3 loss at West Ham United for a foul on Diafra Sakho. On 11 May 2015, Fabiański kept a clean sheet and was named man of the match in a 1–0 win against Arsenal on his return to the Emirates Stadium. On 6 July, Fabiański signed a new four-year contract with Swansea, which would keep him at the club until June 2019. Fabiański played all 38 of Swansea's Premier League games of 2017–18 and was voted Player of the Season by the club's supporters. His performances did not prevent the club from ending the season 18th and they were relegated to the Championship.

=== West Ham United ===
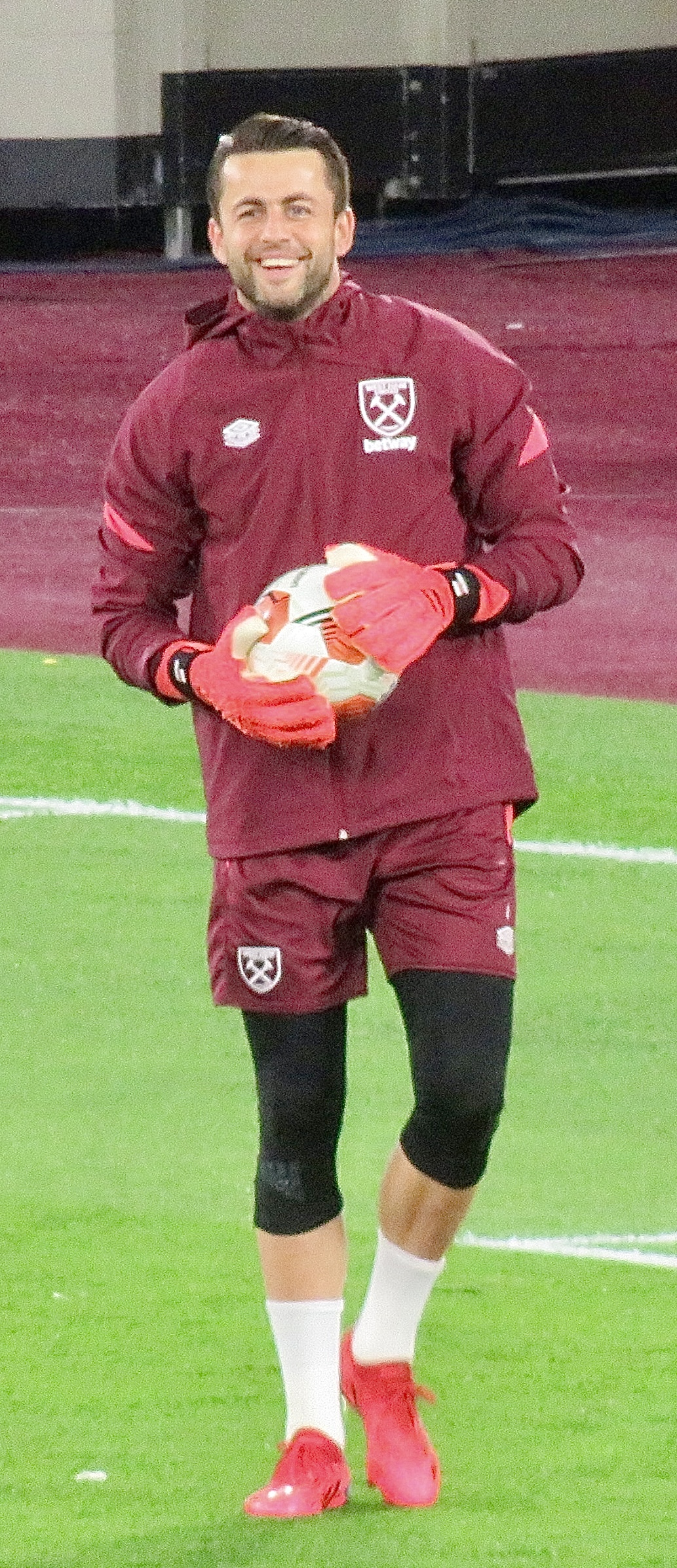
Fabiański with West Ham in 2021

On 20 June 2018, Premier League club West Ham United announced the transfer of Fabiański for £7 million. He signed a three-year contract with the club. Fabiański, the first Pole to play first-team football for West Ham, was installed as first-choice 'keeper at the start of the 2018–19 season.

On 4 December 2018, Fabiański saved his first penalty as a West Ham goalkeeper, saving Joe Ralls' effort in a 3–1 win against Cardiff City. For his performances throughout the season, during which he was ever-present, he was named Hammer of the Year. In September 2019, he suffered a hip injury. During his absence, Roberto and David Martin deputised for Fabiański. In March 2021, Fabiański extended his contract with West Ham until June 2022. On 12 January 2022, Fabianski made his 300th Premier League appearance in a 2–0 victory over Norwich City, the first player from Poland to reach this landmark.

In July 2022, he signed a further contract extension, until the summer of 2023. On 19 October 2022, he made his 150th West Ham United appearance, in a 1–0 Premier League defeat at Liverpool. After having started all 24 of West Ham's Premier League games in the 2022–23 season, on 25 February 2023 he fractured his cheekbone and eye socket in a home game against Nottingham Forest. He had to come off in the 69th minute and was replaced by Alphonse Areola. During the season he started 36 Premier League matches and kept ten clean sheets. He also made one FA Cup appearance, his first since their relegation 2020–21 season. Fabiański saved two penalties during the season, from Leicester City's Youri Tielemans and from Bukayo Saka of Arsenal. During the season he started 36 Premier League matches and kept ten clean sheets. He also made one FA Cup appearance, his first since the 2020–21 season. On 7 June 2023, he was an unused substitute as West Ham won the 2022–23 Europa Conference League beating Fiorentina in Prague.

Having won the previous season's Europa Conference League, West Ham competed in the 2023–24 Europa League. Fabiański was widely used in the competition making his first appearance of the season in the home leg against FK TSC in September 2023. He captained the team in UEFA Europa League Group A wins home and away against SC Freiburg, at home to Olympiacos and away at FK TSC. He started all four UEFA Europa League knockout round ties, away at and home to SC Freiburg and Bayer Leverkusen. He made 23 appearances with 20 starts, and six clean sheets in all competitions and finished the season having made 199 West Ham United appearances.

On 9 May 2025, it was announced that Fabiański would leave the club at the end of his contract on 30 June. He played his final match with the club on 25 May against Ipswich Town, winning 3–1. He had made 17 appearances in all competitions during the season, 14 in the Premier League, two in the League Cup and a single game in the FA Cup. His time with West Ham saw him make 216 appearances over seven seasons.

Return to West Ham, second departure, and retirement

On 10 September 2025, Fabiański rejoined the club in the wake of the departure of goalkeeper Wes Foderingham. On 10 June 2026, West Ham announced that he would be released at the end of the season following the club's relegation to the EFL Championship, ending his second stay with the team. On 25 July, a month after leaving West Ham, Fabiański announced his retirement from professional football.

== International career ==
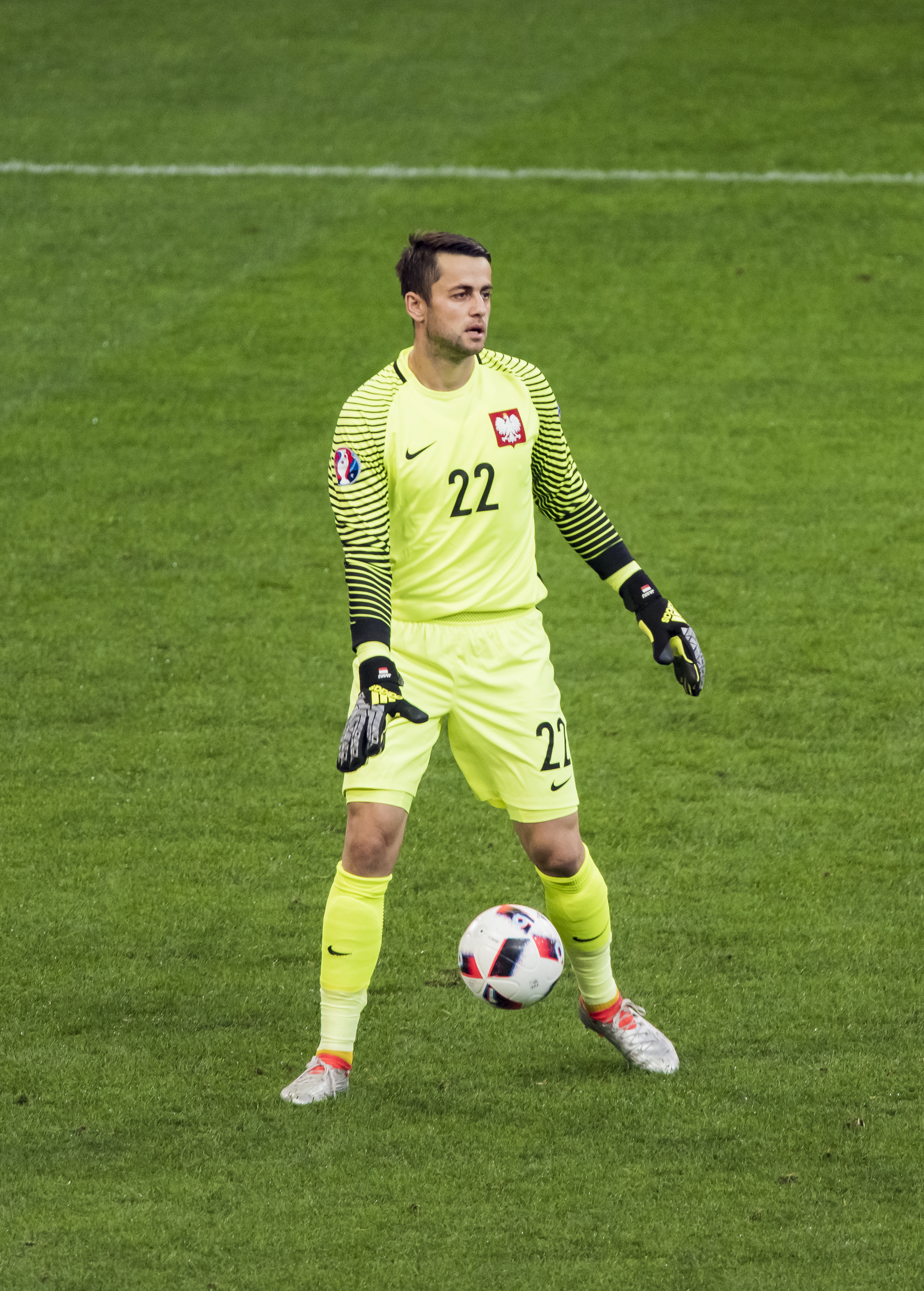
Fabiański playing for Poland against Portugal at UEFA Euro 2016

Having represented Poland regularly at under-21 level, Fabiański's performances for Legia Warsaw saw him soon making his debut for the senior international team in a friendly against Saudi Arabia on 29 March 2006.

Fabiański was included in Poland's squad for the 2006 FIFA World Cup, serving as back-up to Artur Boruc and Tomasz Kuszczak. During the qualifying campaign for the UEFA Euro 2008, he made one appearance, playing all 90 minutes in Poland's 2–2 away draw against Serbia on 21 November 2007. In September 2008, Fabiański replaced the suspended Boruc for the 2010 World Cup qualifiers against San Marino and Slovenia. He also played in another qualifying match against San Marino in April 2009. He was widely seen to be the starting goalkeeper for Poland in the UEFA Euro 2012, before an injury had him ruled out for the tournament held in his home country.

Despite going into UEFA Euro 2016 as an understudy to former Arsenal teammateWojciech Szczęsny, an injury in the first game of the tournament against Northern Ireland led to Fabiański becoming first choice for the rest of the tournament. He went on to keep clean sheets in both of the remaining group games against World champions Germany and Ukraine. He then kept his place as Poland defeated Switzerland in the Round of 16 before losing to eventual winners Portugal on penalties.

Fabiański made seven appearances for Poland in the 2018 FIFA World Cup qualifiers. He was also included in the team's squad for the 2018 FIFA World Cup finals, although Szczęsny was chosen over him to start the first two group matches, where Poland suffered losses to Senegal and Colombia. Fabiański started the final group match against Japan to make his only World Cup appearance, keeping a clean sheet in Poland's 1–0 win, which proved to be too little to prevent the team's elimination from the tournament. He was also included in Poland's squad for the UEFA Euro 2020, but made no appearances as the team suffered another early elimination after only scoring a point in their three group matches.

On 8 August 2021, Fabiański announced his retirement from international football. The following month, he accepted a call-up for his farewell match, a 2022 FIFA World Cup qualification fixture against San Marino on 9 October. Fabiański started the game and was substituted in the 57th minute by Radosław Majecki of the eventual 5–0 home win, officially ending his international career with 57 caps.

== Personal life ==
Fabiański has been in a long term relationship with Anna Grygier, who he has known since high school. The couple got married in 2013 and had their first child together, a son, in 2015.

Fabiański is a fan of basketball and enjoys playing in his spare time.

== Career statistics ==
=== Club ===
Appearances and goals by club, season and competition
Club	Season	League			National cup (Note: Includes Polish Cup, FA Cup)		League cup (Note: Includes Football League/EFL Cup)		Europe		Total	
Club	Season	Division	Apps	Goals	Apps	Goals	Apps	Goals	Apps	Goals	Apps	Goals
Lech Poznań	2004–05	Ekstraklasa	0	0	1	0	—		0	0	1	0
Legia Warsaw	2005–06	Ekstraklasa	30	0	0	0	—		2 (Note: Appearances in UEFA Cup)	0	32	0
Legia Warsaw	2006–07	Ekstraklasa	23	0	1	0	—		6 (Note: Four appearances in UEFA Champions League, two appearances in UEFA Cup)	0	30	0
Legia Warsaw	Total		53	0	1	0	—		8	0	62	0
Arsenal	2007–08	Premier League	3	0	0	0	5	0	0	0	8	0
Arsenal	2008–09	Premier League	6	0	6	0	3	0	3 (Note: Appearance(s) in UEFA Champions League)	0	18	0
Arsenal	2009–10	Premier League	4	0	2	0	2	0	2	0	10	0
Arsenal	2010–11	Premier League	14	0	0	0	1	0	5	0	20	0
Arsenal	2011–12	Premier League	0	0	2	0	3	0	1	0	6	0
Arsenal	2012–13	Premier League	4	0	0	0	0	0	1	0	5	0
Arsenal	2013–14	Premier League	1	0	6	0	2	0	2	0	11	0
Arsenal	Total		32	0	16	0	16	0	14	0	78	0
Swansea City	2014–15	Premier League	37	0	1	0	0	0	—		38	0
Swansea City	2015–16	Premier League	37	0	0	0	0	0	—		37	0
Swansea City	2016–17	Premier League	37	0	0	0	0	0	—		37	0
Swansea City	2017–18	Premier League	38	0	0	0	0	0	—		38	0
Swansea City	Total		149	0	1	0	0	0	—		150	0
West Ham United	2018–19	Premier League	38	0	0	0	0	0	—		38	0
West Ham United	2019–20	Premier League	25	0	1	0	0	0	—		26	0
West Ham United	2020–21	Premier League	35	0	2	0	0	0	—		37	0
West Ham United	2021–22	Premier League	37	0	0	0	0	0	1 (Note: Appearance(s) in UEFA Europa League)	0	38	0
West Ham United	2022–23	Premier League	36	0	1	0	0	0	0	0	37	0
West Ham United	2023–24	Premier League	10	0	2	0	2	0	9	0	23	0
West Ham United	2024–25	Premier League	14	0	1	0	2	0	—		17	0
West Ham United	2025–26	Premier League	0	0	0	0	0	0	—		0	0
West Ham United	Total		195	0	7	0	4	0	10	0	216	0
Career total			429	0	26	0	20	0	32	0	507	0

=== International ===
Appearances and goals by national team and year
National team	Year	Apps	Goals
Poland	2006	3	0
Poland	2007	3	0
Poland	2008	7	0
Poland	2009	3	0
Poland	2010	3	0
Poland	2011	3	0
Poland	2012	1	0
Poland	2014	1	0
Poland	2015	6	0
Poland	2016	10	0
Poland	2017	4	0
Poland	2018	6	0
Poland	2019	4	0
Poland	2020	3	0
Poland	2021	2	0
Total		57	0

== Honours ==
Legia Warsaw

- Ekstraklasa: 2005–06

Arsenal

- FA Cup: 2013–14

West Ham United

- UEFA Europa Conference League: 2022–23

Individual

- Best Goalkeeper of Polish Ekstraklasa: 2005–06, 2006–07
- Swansea City Player of the Season: 2017–18
- Polish Footballer of the Year: 2018
- West Ham United Hammer of the Year: 2018–19
- London Football Awards Goalkeeper of the Year: 2021
