= Oliver Scarles =

English footballer

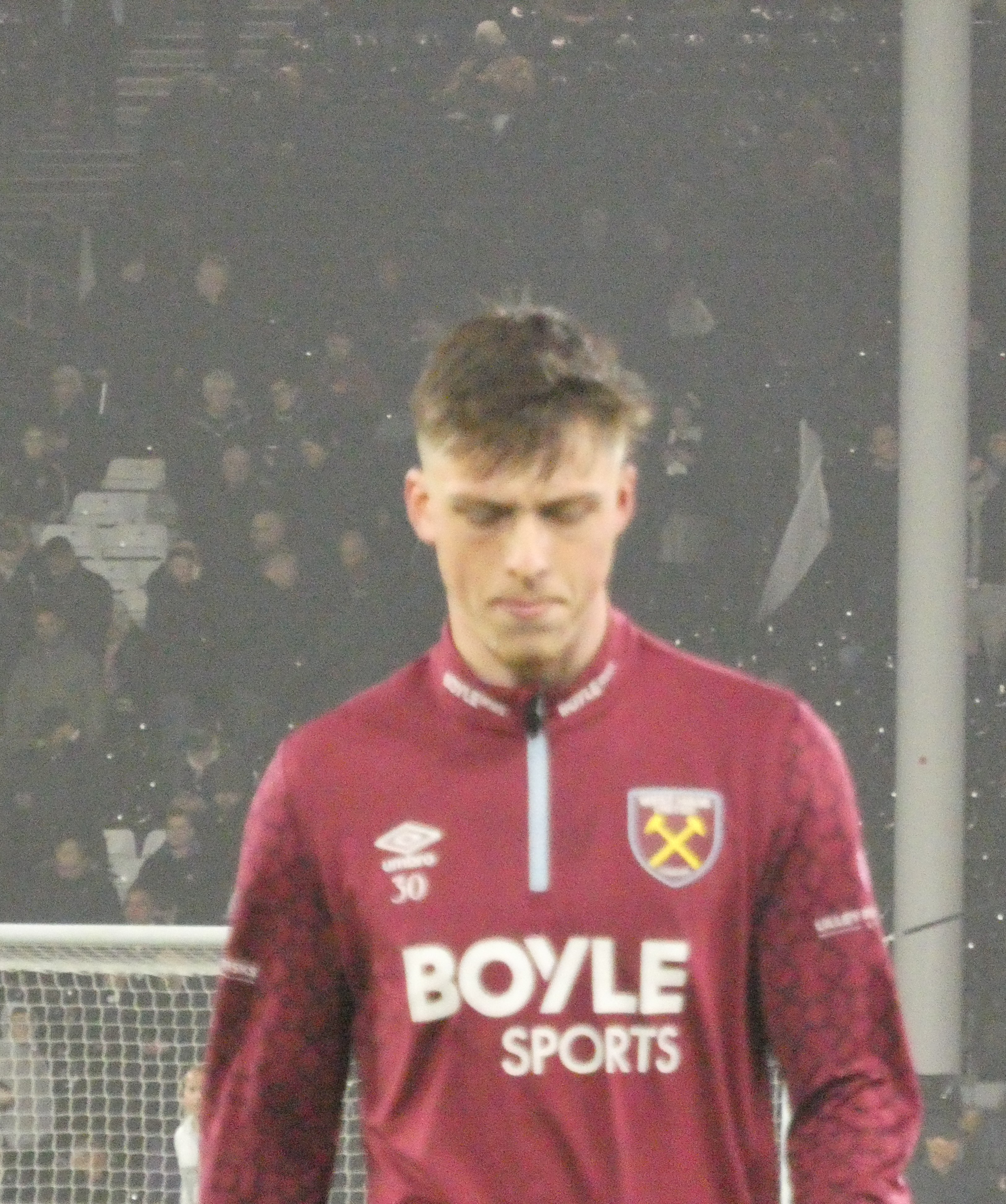
- Scarles in 2026.

Personal information
- Full name: Oliver James Scarles
- Date of birth: 12 December 2005 (age 20)
- Place of birth: Bromley, England
- Height: 5 ft 11 in (1.80 m)
- Position: Full-back

Team information
- Current team: West Ham United
- Number: 30

Youth career
- 2013–2014: West Ham United
- 2014–2017: Chelsea
- 2017–2022: West Ham United

Senior career*
Years	Team	Apps	(Gls)
2022–	West Ham United	37	(0)

International career^{‡}
2021	England U16	2	(0)
2021–2022	England U17	4	(0)
2023	England U18	3	(0)
2025–	England U20	2	(0)
- * Club domestic league appearances and goals as of 17:06, 21 November 2026 (UTC) ‡ National team caps and goals as of 10:23, 10 April 2025 (UTC)

Oliver James Scarles (born 12 December 2005) is an English professional footballer who plays as a left-back for EFL Championship club West Ham United.

== Club career ==
From Bromley, South East London, Scarles attended the Trinity School in Croydon. Scarles was with West Ham at under-8 level and rejoined after playing with Chelsea from under 9 to under-12s before Chelsea released him. In June 2022 Scarles signed a scholarship contract with West Ham.

Scarles was named in the starting eleven for his senior debut for West Ham United on 3 November 2022 in the UEFA Europa Conference League against FCSB. West Ham won the game 3–0 with West Ham manager, David Moyes describing Scarles debut game as "exceptional".

Scarles was a member of the team which won the 2023 FA Youth Cup defeating Arsenal 5–1 at the Emirates Stadium in April 2023.

He made his Premier League debut for West Ham as a second-half substitute away at AFC Bournemouth in a 1–1 draw on 16 December 2024.

== International career ==
Scarles has played for the England national under-17 football team, making his debut in September 2021.

On 22 March 2023, Scarles made his England U18 debut during a 2–1 win over Croatia in Medulin.

On 21 March 2025, Scarles debuted for the England U20s during a 1–1 draw with Portugal.

On 24 March 2025, Scarles played in the final 22 minutes as a substitute for the England U20s against Switzerland national under-21 football team leading to a 2–2 draw.

== Career statistics ==
As of match played 24 October 2026

Appearances and goals by club, season and competition
Club	Season	League			FA Cup		EFL Cup		Europe		Other		Total	
Club	Season	Division	Apps	Goals	Apps	Goals	Apps	Goals	Apps	Goals	Apps	Goals	Apps	Goals
West Ham United	2022–23	Premier League	0	0	0	0	0	0	1 (Note: Appearance in UEFA Europa Conference League)	0	—		1	0
West Ham United	2023–24	Premier League	0	0	0	0	0	0	0	0	—		0	0
West Ham United	2024–25	Premier League	15	0	1	0	0	0	—		—		16	0
West Ham United	2025–26	Premier League	13	0	4	0	0	0	—		—		17	0
West Ham United	2026–27	Championship	8	0	0	0	2	0	—		—		10	0
West Ham United	Total		36	0	5	0	2	0	1	0	0	0	44	0
West Ham United U21	2022–23	—			—		—		—		2 (Note: Appearances in EFL Trophy)	0	2	0
West Ham United U21	2023–24	—			—		—		—		5	1	5	1
West Ham United U21	2024–25	—			—		—		—		3	0	3	0
West Ham United U21	2025–26	—			—		—		—		1	0	1	0
Career total			36	0	5	0	2	0	1	0	11	1	55	1

== Honours ==
West Ham United U18

- FA Youth Cup: 2022–23
- U18 Premier League South: 2023

=== Individual awards ===
- West Ham United Young Hammer of the Year: 2024–25
