= Aaron Cresswell =

English footballer (born 1989)

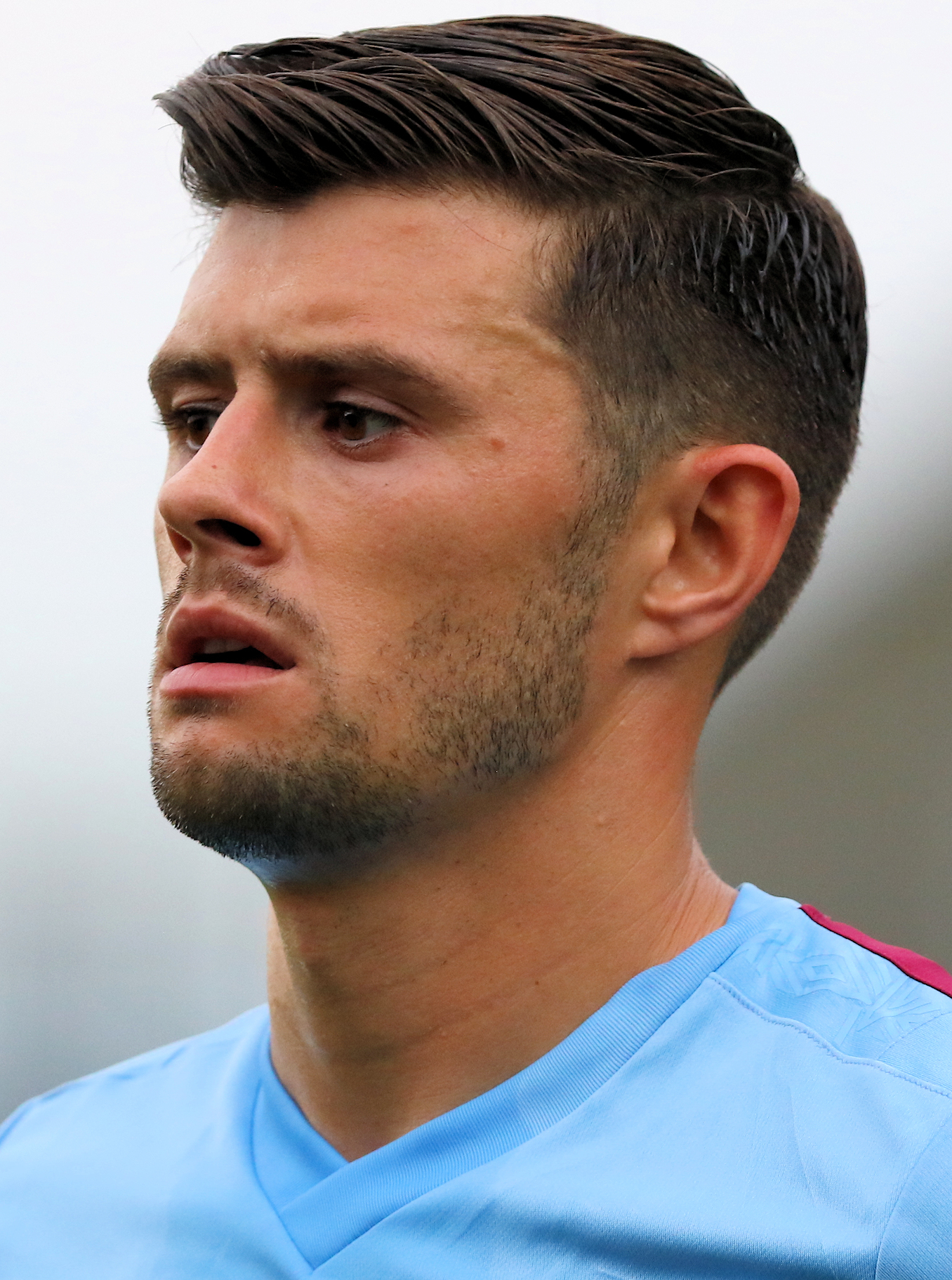
- Cresswell playing for West Ham United in 2019

Personal information
- Full name: Aaron William Cresswell
- Date of birth: 15 December 1989 (age 36)
- Place of birth: Liverpool, England
- Height: 5 ft 7 in (1.70 m)
- Position: Left-back

Team information
- Current team: Stoke City
- Number: 3

Youth career
- Liverpool
- –2008: Tranmere Rovers

Senior career*
Years	Team	Apps	(Gls)
2008–2011	Tranmere Rovers	70	(5)
2011–2014	Ipswich Town	132	(6)
2014–2025	West Ham United	312	(10)
2025–	Stoke City	25	(0)

International career
2016–2017	England	3	(0)
- * Club domestic league appearances and goals as of 15:54, 18 April 2026 (UTC)

Aaron William Cresswell (born 15 December 1989) is an English professional footballer who plays as a left-back for EFL Championship club Stoke City.

Cresswell made his first-team debut for Tranmere Rovers in 2008 and made 70 league appearances for the club before signing for Ipswich Town in 2011, following a tribunal to agree the value of the transfer. He made 138 appearances for Ipswich scoring six goals, before joining West Ham United in July 2014 staying until 2025 when he joined Stoke City.

He made his international debut for England in November 2016 in a friendly against Spain at Wembley Stadium.

== Early life ==
Cresswell was born in Halewood, Liverpool and attended Halewood Academy.

== Club career ==
=== Tranmere Rovers ===
Cresswell started his career with Liverpool, working his way through the academy before being released at the age of 15. Following his release from Liverpool he joined the Tranmere Rovers youth system before signing his first professional contract in July 2008. He made his first-team debut on 1 November 2008 in a League One match with Milton Keynes Dons which ended in a 1–0 loss.

Although he was offered a new contract by the club at the end of the 2010–11 season, Tranmere manager Les Parry expected Cresswell to turn down the contract offer saying "Aaron has got four or five Championship clubs trying to sign him; if I had to guess I would say Aaron might be leaving us this summer."

=== Ipswich Town ===
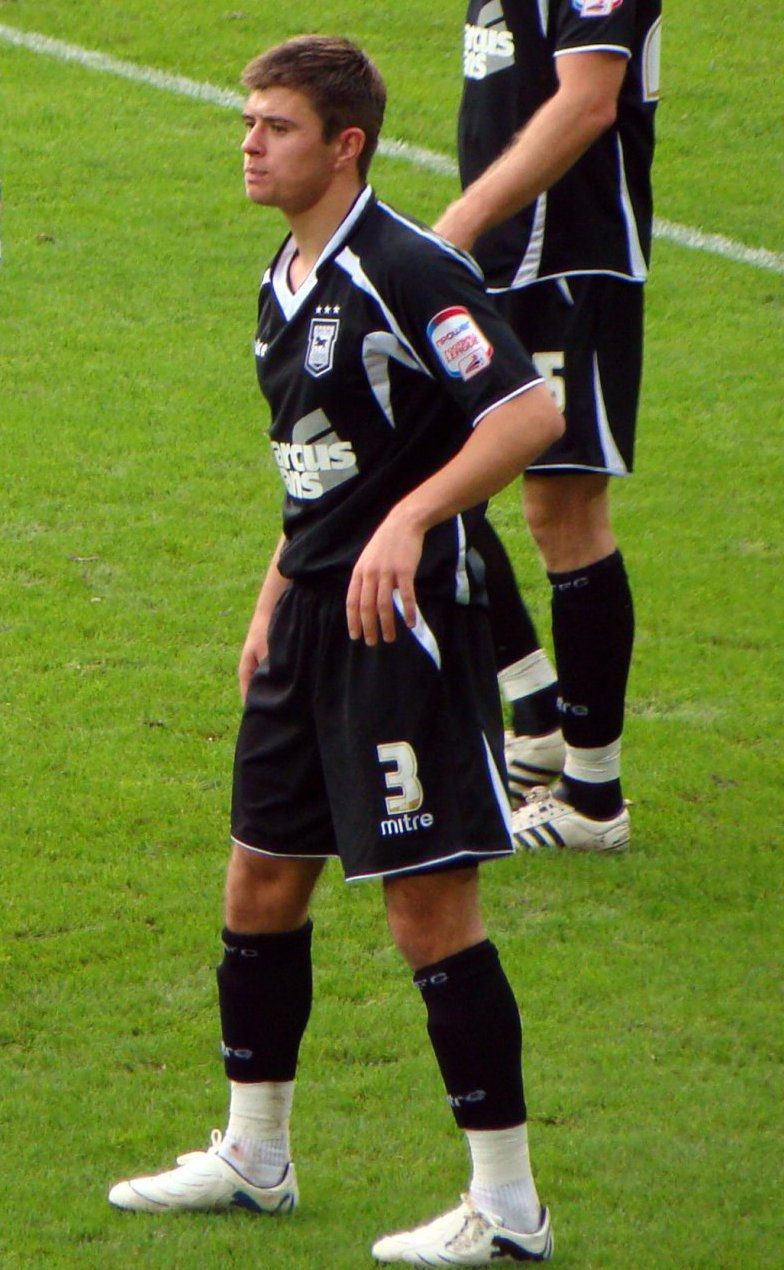
Cresswell playing for Ipswich Town in 2011

In June 2011, the media reported that Ipswich Town had won the race to sign the player beating the likes of West Brom and Doncaster Rovers for his signature, although the clubs had failed to agree a fee and resolution of this was expected to go to a transfer tribunal. A three-year contract was later announced to have been signed. He made his debut for the club on 6 August 2011, starting in a 0–3 away win over Bristol City at Ashton Gate. He scored his first goal for the club on 17 March, netting a late winner in a 3–2 home win over Peterborough United at Portman Road. He made 46 appearances in all competitions during his first season at Portman Road, scoring once. He won the club's Player of the Year award for the 2011–12 season.

In the summer of 2012, fine performances for Ipswich Town, led to Cresswell being linked with Premier League clubs such as Aston Villa.

He continued to keep his place as a first team regular during the 2012–13 season. He scored his first goal of the season in a 3–1 win over Bristol Rovers in a League Cup first round tie. He made 49 appearances over the course of the season, scoring 4 goals. He also won the club's goal of the season award for his strike in a 3–0 win over Crystal Palace on 16 April.

He scored his first goal of the 2013–14 season on 17 September, scoring the winning goal in a 2–1 win over Yeovil Town. He made 43 appearances during the season, scoring 2 goals and earning a place in the PFA Championship Team of the Year.

=== West Ham United ===
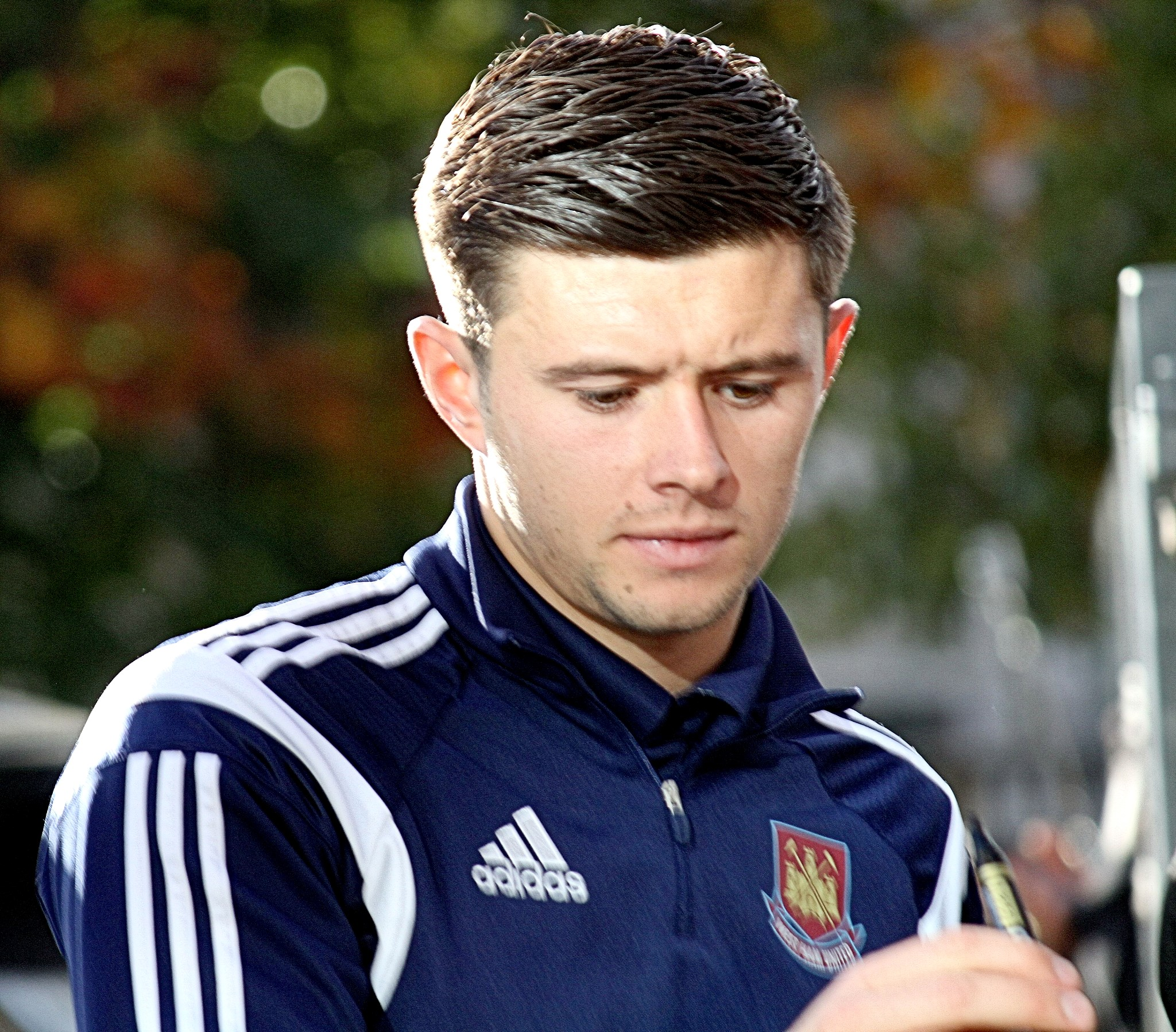
Cresswell in 2014

On 3 July 2014, Cresswell joined West Ham United on a five-year contract for an undisclosed fee believed to be in the region of £3.75 million, plus add on clauses. He made his West Ham debut on 16 August 2014 in a 1–0 home defeat to Tottenham Hotspur. On 29 November he scored his first goal for the club, in the 1–0 victory over Newcastle United at the Boleyn Ground. In May 2015, Cresswell was named Hammer of the Year and Player's Player of the Year. Cresswell played all 38 league matches and all four FA Cup matches for West Ham in 2014–15. In June 2015, Cresswell signed a new contract which would keep him with West Ham until 2020, with the option for a further two years.

Cresswell made the highest number of appearances of any West Ham player in 2015–16, playing in 47 matches. He featured in 37 of the possible 38 Premier League matches scoring two goals, away to Aston Villa on 26 December, and at eventual champions Leicester City in a 2–2 draw on 17 April.

In July 2016, Cresswell was injured in a 3–0 pre-season victory over Karlsruher SC. Suffering a knee-ligament injury, Cresswell was initially expected to be out of action for four months. Cresswell recovered in time to make his return in West Ham's 1–0 victory away at Crystal Palace on 15 October, assisting Manuel Lanzini for the winning goal, however his comeback was cut short after he was sent-off for two yellow cards within a minute.

In September 2019, Cresswell scored a 25-yard free kick against Manchester United to seal a 2–0 victory. Less than a week later Cresswell scored the final goal in a 2–2 draw against AFC Bournemouth. He scored in consecutive league appearances for the first time in his professional career. In October 2019 he signed a new contract until 2023 with West Ham. In November 2019, he scored a late winner against Chelsea, to seal West Ham a 1–0 away victory.

On 11 December 2020, Cresswell made his 200th Premier League appearance for the club in a 2–1 away win against Leeds United, during which he recorded an assist for Angelo Ogbonna's winning header. On 21 March 2021, in a 3–3 draw with Arsenal, Cresswell recorded his 217th Premier League appearance, becoming West Ham's second highest Premier League appearance maker, behind club captain Mark Noble. Cresswell recorded a total of eight assists for West Ham during the 2020–21 season, one more than right-back Vladimír Coufal. The duo recorded the most assists for a full-back pairing during the 2020–21 Premier League season.

On 8 April 2022, during West Ham's UEFA Europa League match against Lyon, Cresswell was sent off for his challenge on Moussa Dembélé just before half-time. Referee Felix Zwayer's decision to send Cresswell off was criticised online, with West Ham fans and manager David Moyes convinced that Dembélé had dived. Less than a month later, Cresswell was sent off once again in West Ham's semi-final match against Eintracht Frankfurt, after bringing down Jens Petter Hauge. He was originally given a yellow card which was upgraded to a red upon review. The team went on to lose 1–0 (3–1 on aggregate) to Frankfurt.

On 7 June 2023, Cresswell was part of the squad in the 2023 UEFA Europa Conference League final, against Fiorentina in Prague. West Ham won their first trophy in 43 years with a 2–1 victory. With his contract due to finish at the end of the 2023–24 season, in April 2024 Cresswell rejected the offer by West Ham of a one–year contract extension. However, on 5 June, he extended his contract for another year.

On 9 May 2025, after an 11-year stay with the club, it was announced that Cresswell would leave West Ham at the end of the 2024–25 season.

=== Stoke City ===
In July 2025, Cresswell joined Championship team, Stoke City signing a one–year contract. Cresswell made 26 appearances in 2025–26, and was in contract talks with the club at the end of the season. Creswwell signed a one-year extension on 25 June 2026.

== International career ==
On 7 November 2016, Cresswell received his first international call-up to the England squad for the 2018 FIFA World Cup qualifier with Scotland and a friendly with Spain, following Danny Drinkwater's withdrawal from the squad due to injury. He made his debut on 15 November, replacing Danny Rose in a 2–2 draw with Spain at Wembley Stadium.

== Career statistics ==
=== Club ===
As of match played 18 April 2026

Appearances and goals by club, season and competition
Club	Season	League			FA Cup		League Cup		Europe		Other		Total	
Club	Season	Division	Apps	Goals	Apps	Goals	Apps	Goals	Apps	Goals	Apps	Goals	Apps	Goals
Tranmere Rovers	2008–09	League One	13	1	1	0	0	0	—		0	0	14	1
Tranmere Rovers	2009–10	League One	14	0	0	0	2	0	—		1 (Note: Appearance(s) in Football League Trophy)	0	17	0
Tranmere Rovers	2010–11	League One	43	4	1	1	2	0	—		3	0	49	5
Tranmere Rovers	Total		70	5	2	1	4	0	—		4	0	80	6
Ipswich Town	2011–12	Championship	44	1	1	0	1	0	—		—		46	1
Ipswich Town	2012–13	Championship	46	3	1	0	2	1	—		—		49	4
Ipswich Town	2013–14	Championship	42	2	1	0	0	0	—		—		43	2
Ipswich Town	Total		132	6	3	0	3	1	—		—		138	7
West Ham United	2014–15	Premier League	38	2	4	0	0	0	—		—		42	2
West Ham United	2015–16	Premier League	37	2	6	0	1	0	3 (Note: Appearances in UEFA Europa League)	0	—		47	2
West Ham United	2016–17	Premier League	26	0	1	0	2	0	—		—		29	0
West Ham United	2017–18	Premier League	36	1	1	0	2	0	—		—		39	1
West Ham United	2018–19	Premier League	20	0	0	0	2	0	—		—		22	0
West Ham United	2019–20	Premier League	31	3	1	0	1	0	—		—		33	3
West Ham United	2020–21	Premier League	36	0	2	0	1	0	—		—		39	0
West Ham United	2021–22	Premier League	31	2	1	0	1	0	9	0	—		42	2
West Ham United	2022–23	Premier League	28	0	1	0	1	0	8 (Note: Appearances in UEFA Europa Conference League)	0	—		38	0
West Ham United	2023–24	Premier League	11	0	1	0	0	0	6	1	—		18	1
West Ham United	2024–25	Premier League	18	0	1	0	1	0	—		—		20	0
West Ham United	Total		312	10	19	0	12	0	26	1	—		369	11
Stoke City	2025–26	Championship	25	0	1	0	0	0	—		—		26	0
Stoke City	2026–27	Championship	0	0	0	0	0	0	—		—		0	0
Stoke City	Total		25	0	1	0	0	0	—		—		26	0
Career total			539	21	25	1	19	1	26	1	4	0	613	24

=== International ===
Appearances and goals by national team and year
National team	Year	Apps	Goals
England	2016	1	0
England	2017	2	0
Total		3	0

== Honours ==
West Ham United

- UEFA Europa Conference League: 2022–23

Individual

- Ipswich Town Player of the Year: 2011–12
- Ipswich Town Goal of the Season: 2012–13
- PFA Team of the Year: 2013–14 Championship
- West Ham United Players' Player of the Year: 2014–15
- West Ham United Hammer of the Year: 2014–15
