= 2024–25 West Ham United F.C. season =

English football team season

West Ham United
2024–25 season
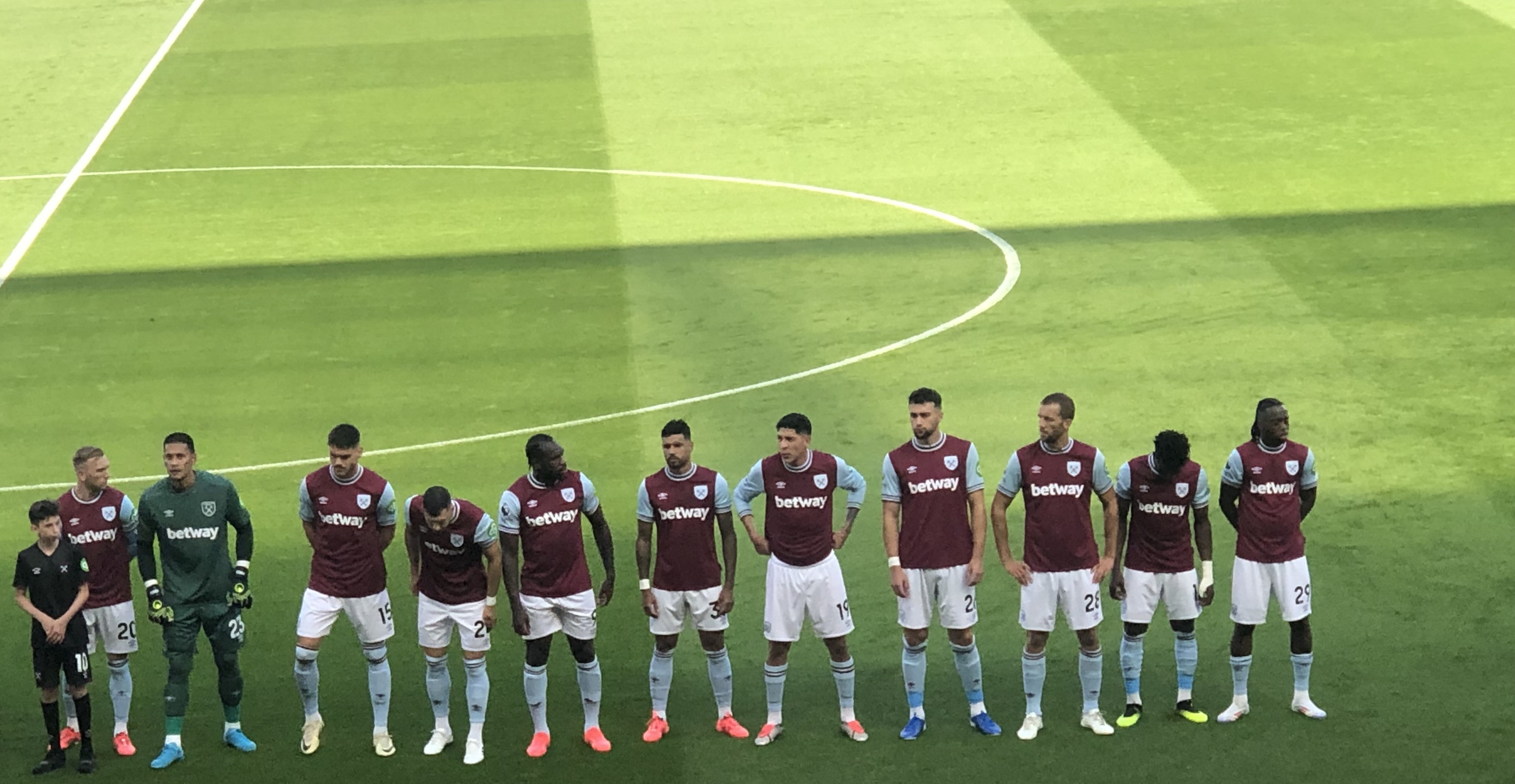
- West Ham United’s starting eleven prior to the match against Fulham on 14 September 2024.
- Owners: David Sullivan (38.8%); Daniel Křetínský (27%); Vanessa Gold (25.1%); J. Albert "Tripp" Smith (8%); Other investors (1.1%)
- Co-chairman: David Sullivan and Vanessa Gold
- Manager: Julen Lopetegui (until 8 January); Graham Potter (from 9 January)
- Stadium: London Stadium
- Premier League: 14th
- FA Cup: Third round
- EFL Cup: Third round
- Top goalscorer: League: Jarrod Bowen (13); All: Jarrod Bowen (14)
- Highest home attendance: 62,476 v Liverpool (29 December 2024, Premier League)
- Lowest home attendance: 47,381 v Bournemouth (28 August 2024, EFL Cup)
- Average home league attendance: 62,464
- Biggest win: 4–1 v Ipswich Town (H) (5 October 2024, Premier League)
- Biggest defeat: 0–5 v Liverpool (H) (29 December 2024, Premier League)
Home colours	Away colours	Third colours

The 2024–25 season was the 130th season in the history of West Ham United Football Club, and the club's thirteenth consecutive season in the Premier League. In addition to the domestic league, the club also participated in the FA Cup and the EFL Cup.

== Season summary ==
=== Start of season ===
==== August ====
West Ham started the season on 17 August with a home game against Aston Villa. Amadou Onana scored a headed goal for Aston Villa in the fourth minute but Lucas Paquetá equalised with a penalty in the 37th minute after Tomáš Souček had been fouled by Matty Cash. In the 79th minute, Jhon Durán, who had been the subject of a possible transfer to West Ham, scored to make it 2–1 to Aston Villa, the final score.

The first away game of the season, at Crystal Palace's Selhurst Park was played on 24 August. West Ham won 2–0 with goals form Tomáš Souček in the 67th minute and Jarrod Bowen in the 72nd minute.

West Ham entered the EFL Cup in the second round, and were drawn at home to Bournemouth. West Ham scored with a controversial "hand ball" goal from Jarrod Bowen in the 88th minute which won the game. West Ham advanced through the third round, where they were drawn away to Liverpool's Anfield.

On 31 August West Ham were at home to reigning champions, Manchester City. Erling Haaland put City 1–0 up after 10 minutes. West Ham equalised on 19 minutes when Rúben Dias deflected the ball into his own net from a Jarrod Bowen cross. Haaland added additional goals in the 30th and 83rd minutes as City won 3–1.

==== September ====
Following a week's break for international matches, West Ham returned to action on 14 September, playing Fulham at Craven Cottage in the Premier League. Raúl Jiménez put the hosts 1–0 up on 24 minutes. The score remained the same until the 95th minute when Danny Ings, on as an 82nd minute substitute for Edson Álvarez, scored to make it 1–1, the final score. On 21 September, West Ham were at home in the Premier League to Chelsea. The visitors scored twice in the first-half with goals from Nicolas Jackson in the 4th and 18th minutes. They added a third in the 47th minute through Cole Palmer. The game finished 3–0 to Chelsea. West Ham's performance was described as "lacklustre" as they lost their first three home league games for the first time in their 129 year history.

On 25 September, West Ham travelled to Anfield to play Liverpool in an EFL Cup third round match. West Ham took the lead on 21 minutes when Jarell Quansah scored an own goal. Their lead lasted only four minutes before Diogo Jota equalised with a header. He added a second in the 49th minute. Liverpool brought on Mohamed Salah for Federico Chiesa in the 59th minute and Salah's goal made in 3–1 in the 74th minute. West Ham were reduced to 10 men two minutes later when Edson Álvarez was sent off after receiving a second yellow card. Liverpool added two goals late on through Cody Gakpo to make the final score 5–1, the same score as in the previous season.

The Gtech Community Stadium hosted West Ham on 28 September as they played Brentford in the Premier League. Bryan Mbeumo scored for Brentford after only 40 seconds. Tomas Soucek scored in the 54th minute to make it 1–1, the final score.

==== October ====
On 5 October, West Ham returned at home in the Premier League for their match against Ipswich Town. Michail Antonio opened the scoresheet in the first minute for West Ham, before Liam Delap equalized for Ipswich Town in the 6th minute. 37 minutes later, Mohammed Kudus scored his first goal in the 2024–25 season for West Ham with a header. Bowen and Paquetá added to the scoreline for West Ham to conclude the match with a 4–1 win, their first home win of the season. Their 13 shots on target in the match was their most in a Premier League game since this statistic was first recorded, in the 2003–04 season.

On 19 October, West Ham travelled to the Tottenham Hotspur Stadium for a Premier League game against Tottenham Hotspur. Mohammed Kudus scored for West Ham in the 18th minute but Dejan Kulusevski equalised in the 36th minute, his shot hitting both posts before going in. In the second-half, Tottenham scored three goals in eight minutes through Yves Bissouma, an Alphonse Areola own-goal and Son Heung-min. In the 85th minute, Kudus was sent off after a VAR review, for pushing both Pape Matar Sarr and Micky van de Ven in the face. The game finished 4–1 leaving West Ham in 15th place in the league. Both West Ham and Tottenham were later charged with failing to control their players after a scuffle broke out following Kudus’ dismissal. Kudus was charged with improper conduct for an incident after he was sent off. On 23 October, Tottenham admitted the offence and were fined £20,000. In November, Kudus was given an additional two-match suspension and fined £60,000. West Ham were fined £30,000.

Returning to the London Stadium on 27 October, West Ham played Manchester United in the Premier League. After Manchester United had missed several goalscoring opportunities, Crysencio Summerville opened scoring for the hosts in the 74th minute. Casemiro equalised in the 81st minute. In added time West Ham were awarded a controversial penalty following a foul on Danny Ings. After a pitchside review as recommended by VAR, referee David Coote confirmed the penalty decision and in the third minute of added time Jarrod Bowen converted the spot kick to make it 2–1, the final score. The following day, Manchester United manager, Erik ten Hag was sacked.

==== November ====
On 2 November, West Ham travelled to the City Ground to play Nottingham Forest in the Premier League. Forest took the lead in the 27th minute from a header by Chris Wood. In the second minute of added time in the first-half, Edson Álvarez was sent-off having received two yellow cards. Forest added a second in the 65th minute when Callum Hudson-Odoi's cross illuded Łukasz Fabiański. A third was scored in the 78th minute when Ola Aina scored from the edge of the box. The game finished 3–0 leaving West Ham in 14th place. Everton were the visitors to the London Stadium on 9 November for a Premier League game. It finished 0–0, the match being described in the press as "boring" with West Ham being booed-off both at half–time and full–time. St James' Park was the venue for West Ham's next game, a Premier League fixture against Newcastle United on 25 November. They took the lead in the 10th minute when Tomáš Souček headed in from a corner. They added a second in the 53rd minute when Aaron Wan-Bissaka scored, his first for the club. The game finished 2–0 as West Ham remained in 14th place in the league.

Arsenal were the visitors to the London Stadium on 30 November for a Premier League game. They took the lead in the 10th minute when Gabriel scored with a header from a corner. They added a second on 27 minutes through Leandro Trossard. Their third goal, a penalty by Martin Ødegaard, was scored in the 34th minute after Lucas Paquetá had tripped Bukayo Saka. Only two minutes later, Kai Havertz added a fourth after Max Kilman missed a long ball leaving Havertz one-on-one with West Ham goalkeeper Łukasz Fabiański. Aaron Wan-Bissaka pulled one back for West Ham in the 38th minute and Emerson scored from a free-kick in the 40th minute to make the score 2–4. However, in the fifth minute of added time, Saka scored a penalty after Fabiański had punched Gabriel. The first-half ended 2–5. No further goals were added in the second–half as West Ham remained 14th in the table, six points above the relegation zone.

==== December ====
On 3 December, West Ham travelled to the King Power Stadium for a Premier League game against Leicester City who were playing their first game under new manager, Ruud van Nistelrooy. Leicester went ahead after only 98 seconds through a Jamie Vardy goal. Although West Ham had numerous chances to equalise, the score was 1–0 at half–time. On 61 minutes, Bilal El Khannouss added a second with Patson Daka scoring a third in the 90th minute. Niclas Füllkrug pulled one back, his first for the club, for West Ham in the third minute of added time. This was only a consolation goal as the game ended 3–1. A portion of the travelling West Ham supporters turned on manager Julen Lopetegui, jeering in his direction towards the end of the game. West Ham played Wolverhampton Wanderers on 9 December in the Premier League at the London Stadium. After a goalless first-half, Tomáš Souček put West Ham ahead on 54 minutes with a header from a corner. Wolves equalised on 69 minutes through Matt Doherty. However, only three minutes later, Jarrod Bowen scored to make it 2–1, final score. Souček dedicated his goal to Michail Antonio who was recovering in hospital after being involved in a car crash in Epping.

AFC Bournemouth were West Ham's opponents on 16 December at Dean Court for a Premier League game. After Łukasz Fabiański had made numerous saves to deny the hosts, West Ham took the lead on 87 minutes with a penalty taken by Lucas Paquetá. Bournemouth equalised in the 90th minute with a free-kick from Enes Ünal. The game finished 1–1. West Ham played Brighton on 21 December at the London Stadium in the Premier League. Brighton took the lead in the 51st minute with a goal from Mats Wieffer. Mohammed Kudus equalised in the 58th minute and celebrated by sitting on top of a wooden stool in the shape of an elephant. The game finished 1–1.

On 26 December, West Ham travelled to St Mary's to play Southampton in the Premier League. They won the game 1–0 with a goal by Jarrod Bowen in the 59th minute, the 100th league goal of his career. On 23 points, West Ham moved up to 13th place in the league.

West Ham played league leaders, Liverpool on 29 December at the London Stadium in the Premier League. The hosts lost 5–0 with the goals being scored by Luis Díaz in the 30th minute, Cody Gakpo in the 40th minute, Mohamed Salah in the 44h minute, Trent Alexander-Arnold in 54th minute and Diogo Jota in the 84th minute. West Ham's performance was described in the media as "abject". They failed to have a single shot on target during the game.

==== January ====
Manchester City were West Ham’s first opponent of 2025 playing them in the Premier League at the Etihad Stadium on 4 January. City went ahead in the 10th minute after Vladimir Coufal deflected Savinho's shot into his own goal. Erling Haaland added a second on 42 minutes after West Ham goalkeeper, Alphonse Areola failed to deal with a cross from Savinho. Harland added a third on 55 minutes chipping over Areola after being put through on goal with another pass from Savinho. City scored a fourth only three minutes later through Phil Foden. Niclas Fullkrüg scored for West Ham on 71 minutes to make it 4–1, the final score. Manager Lopetegui was sacked on 8 January with West Ham in 14th position in the league table, seven points above the relegation positions. In his time as manager, West Ham lost nine of 20 Premier League games. On 9 January Graham Potter was appointed as head coach signing a two–and–a–half year contract. Potter's first game in charge was on 10 January, an FA Cup third round game against Aston Villa at Villa Park. Lucas Paquetá scored after nine minutes to put West Ham 1–0 up, the score at half–time. Amadou Onana equalised on 71 minutes and Morgan Rogers put Villa 2–1 up four minutes later. The game ended 2–1 as West Ham exited the 2024–25 FA Cup.

On 14 January, Potter won his first Premier League match in charge as West Ham beat Fulham. Carlos Soler pounced on Andreas Pereira's mistake in the 31st minute with Tomáš Souček scoring a second two minutes later. In the 51st minute, Alex Iwobi pulled one back but West Ham added a third after Danny Ings tackled goalkeeper Bernd Leno with Lucas Paquetá scoring from his assist in the 67th minute. Iwobi scored his second in the 78th minute but Fulham could not find an equaliser and the game finished 3–2.

Crystal Palace were the visitors to the London Stadium on 18 January in the Premier League. After a quiet first half, Jean-Philippe Mateta opened the scoring in the 48th minute with a low strike from outside the box. In the 80th minute Konstantinos Mavropanos was sent off after receiving a second yellow card after he grappled with Mateta and launched a high boot into his face. Mateta scored from the penalty spot in the 89th minute, after 'keeper Fabianski had brought down substitute Eddie Nketiah, to make it 2–0, the final score.

On 26 January, West Ham travelled to Villa Park for a Premier League game against Aston Villa. Jacob Ramsey scored for the hosts after eight minutes but Emerson equalised after 70 minutes, from an Edson Alvarez's cross, to make it 1–1, the final score.

==== February ====
On 3 February, manager Potter returned to his old club as West Ham played Chelsea at Stamford Bridge. West Ham took the lead on 42 minutes with a goal by Jarrod Bowen as he pounced on Levi Colwill's blind backpass to shoot into the bottom-left corner. The second–half introduction of Pedro Neto sparked Chelsea to life and on 64 minutes he made the score 1–1 after he followed up Enzo Fernández's blocked shot. On 74 minutes Cole Palmer's footwork saw him open up space on the left of the box, his shot hitting Aaron Wan-Bissaka and going over 'keeper Areola to make it 2–1 to Chelsea, the final score.

On 15 February, West Ham again lost at home, this time to Brentford. Kevin Schade scored the only goal, in the fourth minute.

On 22 February, West Ham travelled to The Emirates to play Arsenal in the Premier League. Jarrod Bowen put West Ham ahead on 44 minutes heading in from Aaron Wan-Bissaka's cross to score his 50th Premier League goal. Arsenal had Myles Lewis-Skelly sent off in the 73rd minute for denying a goal scoring opportunity by Mohammed Kudus. No further goals were scored as West Ham won at The Emirates for the second successive season.

Relegation threatened Leicester City were the visitors to the London Stadium on 27 February in the Premier League. On his 30th birthday, Tomáš Souček scored on 21 minutes. On 43 minutes Jarrod Bowen’s low shot deflected in off of Jannik Vestergaard to make it 2–0. There were no further goals as West Ham won back-to-back games for the first time since March 2024.

==== March ====
Newcastle United were the visitors to the London Stadium on 10 March in the Premier League. Bruno Guimarães scored in the 63rd minute from a Harvey Barnes cross. West Ham dropped to 16th in the league as they lost 1–0.

On 15 March, West Ham travelled to Goodison Park for the last time before Everton moved to their new stadium. Now managed by West Ham’s former manager, David Moyes, the hosts went behind in the 67th minute with a goal by Tomáš Souček from a Jarrod Bowen assist. Everton equalised in the 91st minute through Jake O'Brien and the game ended 1–1.

==== April ====
On 1 April West Ham visited Molineux to play Wolverhampton Wanderers in the Premier League. The only goal of the game was scored in the 21st minute by Jørgen Strand Larsen as West Ham completed a performance described as "limp".

Bournemouth were the visitors to the London Stadium on 5 April for a Premier League game. Evanilson gave Bournemouth the lead in the 38th minute following a mistake from West Ham 'keeper Alphonse Areola. The hosts turned the game around in seven second-half minutes, with a pair of headers from substitute Niclas Fullkrüg and from Jarrod Bowen in the 61st and 68th minutes. However, Evanilson got his second goal of the game in the 79th minute, from close range, with the goal confirmed after VAR check. The game finished 2–2.

On 13 April, West Ham travelled to Anfield to play Liverpool. Luis Díaz scored after 18 minute but four minutes to play, Andrew Robertson knocked Aaron Wan-Bissaka's cross into his own net. However, with one minute remaining Virgil van Dijk rose to head home a corner to make it 2-1, the final score.

Southampton were the visitors to the London Stadium on 19 April in the Premier League. Jarrod Bowen put West Ham 1–0 up on 47 minutes. However, Lesley Ugochukwu scored in the third minute of added time, his shot going in off of the post. The game finished 1–1 extending West Ham’s winless run to six games.

Late season

On 11 May, West Ham defeated Manchester United 2–0 at Old Trafford, with goals from Tomáš Souček and Jarrod Bowen in each half. This was West Ham's first away league victory over Manchester United since May 2007. It was also the first time West Ham had achieved a league double over their opponents since 2006-07 season, having previously beaten them at home in October. The win sent The Hammers above their opponents into 15th place in the table.

== Squad ==
As of 13 February 2025

Squad no.	Player	Nationality	Position(s)	Date of birth (age)
Goalkeepers
1	Łukasz Fabiański	(Poland)	GK	18 April 1985 (age 41)
21	Wes Foderingham	(England)	GK	14 January 1991 (age 35)
23	Alphonse Areola	(France)	GK	27 February 1993 (age 33)
Defenders
3	Aaron Cresswell	(England)	LB	15 December 1989 (age 36)
5	Vladimír Coufal	(Czech Republic)	RB	22 August 1992 (age 34)
15	Konstantinos Mavropanos	(Greece)	CB/RB	11 December 1997 (age 28)
25	Jean-Clair Todibo	(France)	CB	30 December 1999 (age 26)
26	Maximilian Kilman	(England)	CB	23 May 1997 (age 29)
29	Aaron Wan-Bissaka	(England)	RB	26 November 1997 (age 28)
33	Emerson Palmieri	(Italy)	LB	3 August 1994 (age 32)
42	Kaelan Casey	(England)	CB	28 October 2004 (age 22)
57	Oliver Scarles	(England)	LB	12 December 2005 (age 20)
Midfielders
4	Carlos Soler	(Spain)	CM	2 January 1997 (age 29)
8	James Ward-Prowse	(England)	CM	1 November 1994 (age 32)
10	Lucas Paquetá	(Brazil)	AM/CM	27 August 1997 (age 29)
14	Mohammed Kudus	(Ghana)	AM/RW	2 August 2000 (age 26)
19	Edson Álvarez	(Mexico)	DM/CB	24 October 1997 (age 29)
24	Guido Rodríguez	(Argentina)	DM	12 April 1994 (age 32)
28	Tomáš Souček	(Czech Republic)	DM/CM	27 February 1995 (age 31)
39	Andy Irving	(Scotland)	CM	13 May 2000 (age 26)
61	Lewis Orford	(England)	CM/AM	18 February 2006 (age 20)
Forwards
7	Crysencio Summerville	(Netherlands)	LW	30 October 2001 (age 25)
9	Michail Antonio	(Jamaica)	CF/LW/RW	28 March 1990 (age 36)
11	Niclas Füllkrug	(Germany)	CF	9 February 1993 (age 33)
17	Luis Guilherme	(Brazil)	RW	6 February 2006 (age 20)
18	Danny Ings	(England)	CF/SS	23 July 1992 (age 34)
20	Jarrod Bowen (C)	(England)	RW/CF/SS	20 December 1996 (age 29)
34	Evan Ferguson	(Republic of Ireland)	CF	19 October 2004 (age 20)
Out on loan
4	Kurt Zouma	(France)	CB	27 October 1994 (age 32)
22	Maxwel Cornet	(Ivory Coast)	LW/LB/CF	27 September 1996 (age 30)
27	Nayef Aguerd	(Morocco)	CB	30 March 1996 (age 30)

Last updated: 2 September 2024.
Source: West Ham United F.C.

== Transfers ==
=== In ===
Date	Pos.	Player	From	Fee	Ref.
14 June 2024 (Note: The transfer was announced on 13 June, and would become official on June 14 once the transfer window re-opens.)	RW	(Brazil) Luis Guilherme	(Brazil) Palmeiras	£25,500,000	
1 July 2024 (Note: The transfer was announced on 26 June, and would become official on July 1 once his Sheffield United contract expired.)	GK	(England) Wes Foderingham	(England) Sheffield United	Free	
6 July 2024	CB	(England) Maximilian Kilman	(England) Wolverhampton Wanderers	£40,000,000	
3 August 2024	LW	(Netherlands) Crysencio Summerville	(England) Leeds United	£25,000,000	
5 August 2024	CF	(Germany) Niclas Füllkrug	(Germany) Borussia Dortmund	£27,000,000	
6 August 2024	DM	(Argentina) Guido Rodríguez	(Spain) Real Betis	Free	
13 August 2024	RB	(England) Aaron Wan-Bissaka	(England) Manchester United	£15,000,000	
16 August 2024	CF	(England) Brad Dolaghan (Note: Signed initially for the under-21's.)	(England) Worthing	Undisclosed	
22 August 2024	CM	(France) Mohamadou Kanté	(France) Paris FC	Undisclosed	
30 January 2025	CF	(Scotland) Josh Landers	(Scotland) Hibernian	Undisclosed	

=== Out ===
Date	Pos.	Player	To	Fee	Ref.
14 June 2024 (Note: The transfer was announced on 17 May and would become official on June 14 once the transfer window re-opens.)	CB	(Germany) Thilo Kehrer	(France) Monaco	£9,500,000	
22 June 2024	GK	(England) Nathan Trott	(Denmark) Copenhagen	Undisclosed	
30 June 2024	LW	(Algeria) Saïd Benrahma	(France) Lyon	Undisclosed	
16 July 2024	DM	(England) Flynn Downes	(England) Southampton	Undisclosed	

=== Loaned in ===
Date	Pos.	Player	From	Date until	Ref.
10 August 2024	CB	(France) Jean-Clair Todibo	(France) Nice	End of season	
30 August 2024	CM	(Spain) Carlos Soler	(France) Paris Saint-Germain	End of season	
3 February 2025	CF	(Republic of Ireland) Evan Ferguson	(England) Brighton & Hove Albion	End of season	

=== Loaned out ===
Date	Pos.	Player	To	Date until	Ref.
1 July 2024 (Note: The loan was announced on 28 June and would officially commence on 1 July.)	GK	(Hungary) Krisztián Hegyi	(Scotland) Motherwell	11 January 2025 (Note: On 11 January, Hegyi was recalled back from his loan at Motherwell)	
5 July 2024	CB	(Northern Ireland) Michael Forbes	(England) Bristol Rovers	3 January 2025 (Note: On 3 January, Forbes was recalled back from his loan at Bristol Rovers)	
26 July 2024	CB	(England) Levi Laing	(England) Cheltenham Town	3 January 2025 (Note: On 3 January, Laing was recalled back from his loan at Cheltenham Town)	
8 August 2024	CM	(Northern Ireland) Patrick Kelly	(England) Doncaster Rovers	End of season	
9 August 2024	CF	(Northern Ireland) Callum Marshall	(England) Huddersfield Town	End of season	
14 August 2024	AM	(England) George Earthy	(England) Bristol City	End of season	
22 August 2024	CM	(France) Mohamadou Kanté	(France) Paris FC	End of season	
23 August 2024	CF	(England) Gideon Kodua	(England) Wycombe Wanderers	End of season	
26 August 2024	DM	(England) Freddie Potts	(England) Portsmouth	End of season	
30 August 2024	CM	(England) James Ward-Prowse	(England) Nottingham Forest	3 February 2025 (Note: On 3 February, Ward-Prowse was recalled back from his loan at Nottingham Forest by mutual agreement)	
30 August 2024	CB	(Morocco) Nayef Aguerd	(Spain) Real Sociedad	End of season	
31 August 2024	LW	(Ivory Coast) Maxwel Cornet	(England) Southampton	21 January 2025 (Note: On 21 January, Cornet was recalled back from his loan at Southampton and subsequently joined Genoa on loan)	
31 August 2024	CB	(France) Kurt Zouma	(Saudi Arabia) Al-Orobah	End of season	
21 January 2025	LW	(Ivory Coast) Maxwel Cornet	(Italy) Genoa	End of season	
30 January 2025	CB	(Northern Ireland) Michael Forbes	(England) Colchester United	End of season	
31 January 2025	LB	(England) Regan Clayton	(England) Dagenham & Redbridge	End of season	
3 February 2025	CF	(England) Brad Dolaghan	(England) Aldershot Town	End of season	
4 February 2025	RB	(England) Junior Robinson	(England) Sutton United	End of season	
24 February 2025	CB	(Brazil) Luizão	(Poland) Pogoń Szczecin	End of season	

=== Released / Out of contract ===
Date	Pos.	Player	Subsequent club	Join date	Ref.
30 June 2024	GK	(Ghana) Joseph Anang	(Republic of Ireland) St Patrick's Athletic	1 July 2024	
30 June 2024	RM	(England) Daniel Chesters	(England) Salford City	1 July 2024	
30 June 2024	RB	(England) Ben Johnson	(England) Ipswich Town	1 July 2024	
30 June 2024	GK	(England) Jacob Knightbridge	(England) Oxford United	1 July 2024	
30 June 2024	CF	(England) Jemiah Umolu	(England) Crystal Palace	2 July 2024	
30 June 2024	CM	(England) Sebastian Boothe	(United States) Lindenwood Lions	7 August 2024	
30 June 2024	CB	(Italy) Angelo Ogbonna	(England) Watford	27 August 2024	
30 June 2024	CF	(England) Divin Mubama	(England) Manchester City	29 August 2024 (Note: West Ham United received a £2 million compensation fee due to Mubama's development in their academy.)	
30 June 2024	DM	(England) Keenan Forson	(England) Southend United	30 August 2024	
30 June 2024	AM	(Democratic Republic of the Congo) Blaise Uwandji	(England) Romford	November 2024	
30 June 2024	LB	(England) Liam Jones	(England) Bowers & Pitsea	7 December 2024	
6 February 2025	RW	(England) Favour Fawunmi	(England) Stoke City	7 February 2025	
6 February 2025	CB	(England) Sean Tarima	(England) FC Halifax Town	21 March 2025	

== Pre-season and friendlies ==
On 9 May, West Ham announced they would travel to Florida for the first time, as part of the inaugural Stateside Cup pre-season tournament, against Wolverhampton Wanderers and Crystal Palace. A further fixture, against Dagenham & Redbridge on 20 July, was announced on 28 May. In June, a home fixture versus Celta Vigo was confirmed. In July, West Ham United headed to Austria for a week-long training camp, which would conclude with a fixture against Ferencváros.

Win Draw Loss Fixtures

15 July 2024 Friendly	Ferencváros (Hungary)	2–2	(England) West Ham United	Kitzbühel, Austria
15:00 BST	Owusu 25'; Pešić 41'; Maïga (yellow card) 47'	Report	Ings 49'; Aguerd 90'	Stadium: Sportstadion Langau

20 July 2024 Friendly	Dagenham & Redbridge (England)	0–1	(England) West Ham United	Dagenham
15:00 BST			Irving 50'	Stadium: Victoria Road

27 July 2024 Stateside Cup	Wolverhampton Wanderers (England)	3–1	(England) West Ham United	Jacksonville, United States
21:05 EDT (03:05 BST)	Cunha 18'; R. Gomes 72', 77'	Report	Kudus 44'; Zouma (yellow card) 49'	Stadium: EverBank Stadium

3 August 2024 Stateside Cup	Crystal Palace (England)	3–1	(England) West Ham United	Tampa, United States
19:00 EDT (00:00 BST)	Mitchell 1'; Schlupp 66'; Édouard 69'	Report	Antonio 21'	Stadium: Raymond James Stadium; Referee: Rosendo Mendoza

10 August 2024 Betway Cup	West Ham United (England)	2–2 (6–5 p)	(Spain) Celta Vigo	Stratford
15:00 BST	Bowen 6'; Paquetá 35'	Report	Ristić 21'; Durán 66'	Stadium: London Stadium; Referee: Darren Bond
	Penalties
	Cresswell (penalty scored); Ward-Prowse (penalty scored); Souček (penalty scored); Füllkrug (penalty missed); Aguerd (penalty scored); Kilman (penalty scored); Guilherme (penalty scored)		(penalty missed) Moriba; (penalty scored) Álvarez; (penalty scored) Sotelo; (penalty scored) Alfon; (penalty scored) Domínguez; (penalty scored) Aidoo; (penalty missed) Durán

== Competitions ==
=== Overall record ===
Competition	First match	Last match	Starting round	Final position	Record							
Competition	First match	Last match	Starting round	Final position	Pld	W	D	L	GF	GA	GD	Win %
Premier League	17 August 2024	25 May 2025	Matchday 1	14th	38	11	10	17	46	62	−16	28.95
FA Cup	10 January 2025		Third round	Third round	1	0	0	1	1	2	−1	0.00
EFL Cup	28 August 2024	25 September 2024	Second round	Third round	2	1	0	1	2	5	−3	50.00
Total					41	12	10	19	49	69	−20	29.27

Source: Soccerway

=== Premier League ===
==== League table ====
Pos	Team	Pld	W	D	L	GF	GA	GD	Pts	Qualification or relegation
12	Crystal Palace	38	13	14	11	51	51	0	53	Qualification for the Conference League play-off round (Note: Since the winners of the 2024–25 EFL Cup, Newcastle United, qualified for the Champions League via league position, the spot reserved for the EFL Cup winners (Conference League play-off round) was initially passed to the 7th-placed team (Nottingham Forest). However due to multi-club ownership rules, the winners of the FA Cup, Crystal Palace, were not permitted to enter the Europa League and entered the Conference League play-off round instead, with Nottingham Forest taking their place in the Europa League. Crystal Palace appealed the decision but this was ultimately rejected.)
13	Everton	38	11	15	12	42	44	−2	48	
14	West Ham United	38	11	10	17	46	62	−16	43	
15	Manchester United	38	11	9	18	44	54	−10	42	
16	Wolverhampton Wanderers	38	12	6	20	54	69	−15	42	

Source: Premier League
Rules for classification: 1) Points; 2) Goal difference; 3) Goals scored; 4) If the champions, relegated teams or qualified teams for UEFA competitions cannot be determined by rules 1 to 3, rules 4.1 to 4.3 are applied – 4.1) Points gained in head-to-head record between such teams; 4.2) Away goals scored in head-to-head record between such teams; 4.3) Play-offs

==== Results summary ====
Overall								Home						Away					
Pld	W	D	L	GF	GA	GD	Pts	W	D	L	GF	GA	GD	W	D	L	GF	GA	GD
38	11	10	17	46	62	−16	43	5	5	9	23	34	−11	6	5	8	23	28	−5

Source: Soccerway

==== Results by round ====
Round	1	2	3	4	5	6	7	8	9	10	11	12	13	14	15	16	17	18	19	20	21	22	23	24	25	26	27	28	29	30	31	32	33	34	35	36	37	38
Ground	H	A	H	A	H	A	H	A	H	A	H	A	H	A	H	A	H	A	H	A	H	H	A	A	H	A	H	H	A	A	H	A	H	A	H	A	H	A
Result	L	W	L	D	L	D	W	L	W	L	D	W	L	L	W	D	D	W	L	L	W	L	D	L	L	W	W	L	D	L	D	L	D	L	D	W	L	W
Position	14	9	13	14	14	14	12	15	13	14	14	14	14	14	14	14	14	13	13	14	13	14	14	16	16	16	15	16	16	16	16	17	17	17	17	15	15	14
Points	0	3	3	4	4	5	8	8	11	11	12	15	15	15	18	19	20	23	23	23	26	26	27	27	27	30	33	33	34	34	35	35	36	36	37	40	40	43

Source: Soccerway
A = Away; H = Home; W = Win; D = Draw; L = Loss

==== Matches ====
On 18 June, the Premier League fixtures were released.

Win Draw Loss Fixtures

17 August 2024 1	West Ham United	1–2	Aston Villa	Stratford
17:30 BST	Paquetá (yellow card) 31', (goal) 37' (pen.)	Report	Onana 4'; Bailey (yellow card) 8'; Durán 79'; Philogene (yellow card) 90'	Stadium: London Stadium; Attendance: 62,463; Referee: Tony Harrington

24 August 2024 2	Crystal Palace	0–2	West Ham United	Selhurst
15:00 BST	Lerma (yellow card) 55'	Report	Souček (yellow card) 63', (goal) 67'; Bowen 72'	Stadium: Selhurst Park; Attendance: 25,099; Referee: Robert Jones

31 August 2024 3	West Ham United	1–3	Manchester City	Stratford
17:30 BST	Dias 19' (o.g.); Emerson (yellow card) 61'; Kilman (yellow card) 63'; Rodríguez (yellow card) 76'	Report	Haaland 10', 30', 83'; De Bruyne (yellow card) 44'; Akanji (yellow card) 90+1'	Stadium: London Stadium; Attendance: 62,469; Referee: Michael Oliver
Note: Fixture was initially scheduled for a 15:00 kick-off, but was moved for live Sky Sports broadcast.

14 September 2024 4	Fulham	1–1	West Ham United	Fulham
15:00 BST	Jiménez 24'; Lukić (yellow card) 53'; Nelson (yellow card) 90+2'	Report	Rodríguez (yellow card) 69'; Álvarez (yellow card) 74'; Soler (yellow card) 82'; Ings 90+5'	Stadium: Craven Cottage; Attendance: 26,528; Referee: Tim Robinson

21 September 2024 5	West Ham United	0–3	Chelsea	Stratford
12:30 BST	Souček (yellow card) 47'; Álvarez (yellow card) 49'; Kilman (yellow card) 77'; Antonio (yellow card) 83'; Soler (yellow card) 90+3'	Report	Jackson 4', 18'; Fofana (yellow card) 45'; Palmer 47'; Cucurella (yellow card) 71'	Stadium: London Stadium; Attendance: 62,473; Referee: Sam Barrott
Note: Fixture was initially scheduled for a 15:00 kick-off, but was moved for live TNT Sports broadcast.

28 September 2024 6	Brentford	1–1	West Ham United	Brentford
15:00 BST	Mbeumo 1'; Yarmoliuk (yellow card) 67'; Lewis-Potter (yellow card) 87'	Report	Emerson (yellow card) 14'; Souček 54'; Kilman (yellow card) 90+3'; Irving (yellow card) 90+8'	Stadium: Brentford Community Stadium; Attendance: 17,050; Referee: Simon Hooper

5 October 2024 7	West Ham United	4–1	Ipswich Town	Stratford
15:00 BST	Antonio 1'; Kudus 43'; Bowen 49'; Paquetá 69'	Report	Delap 6'; Clarke (yellow card) 31'	Stadium: London Stadium; Attendance: 62,467; Referee: Anthony Taylor

19 October 2024 8	Tottenham Hotspur	4–1	West Ham United	Tottenham
12:30 BST	Kulusevski 36'; Bissouma 52'; Areola 55' (o.g.); Son Heung-min 60'; Van de Ven (yellow card) 84'	Report	Kudus 18', (red card) 84'; Paquetá (yellow card) 43'; Souček (yellow card) 56'; Soler (yellow card) 67'	Stadium: Tottenham Hotspur Stadium; Attendance: 61,381; Referee: Andrew Madley
Note: Fixture was initially scheduled for a 15:00 kick-off, but was moved for live TNT Sports broadcast.

27 October 2024 9	West Ham United	2–1	Manchester United	Stratford
14:00 GMT	Paquetá (yellow card) 25'; Mavropanos (yellow card) 30'; Summerville 74', (yellow card) 74'; Bowen 90+2' (pen.); Emerson (yellow card) 90+5'; Cresswell (yellow card) 90+6'	Report	De Ligt (yellow card) 59'; Casemiro 81'	Stadium: London Stadium; Attendance: 62,474; Referee: David Coote
Note: Fixture was initially scheduled for 26 October, but was moved due to Manchester United's UEFA Europa League involvement on the preceding Thursday.

2 November 2024 10	Nottingham Forest	3–0	West Ham United	West Bridgford
15:00 GMT	Wood 27'; Hudson-Odoi 65'; Aina 78'; Anderson (yellow card) 81'	Report	Rodríguez (yellow card) 18'; Álvarez (yellow card) 39' (yellow-red card) 45+2'; Paquetá (yellow card) 77'	Stadium: City Ground; Attendance: 30,112; Referee: Peter Bankes

9 November 2024 11	West Ham United	0–0	Everton	Stratford
15:00 GMT	Coufal (yellow card) 88'	Report	Gueye (yellow card) 76'; Young (yellow card) 85'	Stadium: London Stadium; Attendance: 62,463; Referee: Stuart Attwell

25 November 2024 12	Newcastle United	0–2	West Ham United	Newcastle upon Tyne
20:00 GMT	Kelly (yellow card) 61'	Report	Souček 10'; Wan-Bissaka 53'	Stadium: St James' Park; Attendance: 52,094; Referee: Craig Pawson
Note: Fixture was initially scheduled for 23 November, but was moved for live Sky Sports broadcast.

30 November 2024 13	West Ham United	2–5	Arsenal	Stratford
17:30 GMT	Wan-Bissaka 38'; Emerson 40', (yellow card) 42'; Summerville (yellow card) 45+1'; Fabiański (yellow card) 45+3'; Souček (yellow card) 90+4'	Report	Gabriel 10'; Trossard 27'; Ødegaard 34' (pen.); Havertz 36'; Saka (yellow card) 42' (goal) 45+5' (pen.)	Stadium: London Stadium; Attendance: 62,475; Referee: Anthony Taylor
Note: Fixture was initially scheduled for a 15:00 kick-off, but was moved for live Sky Sports broadcast.

3 December 2024 14	Leicester City	3–1	West Ham United	Leicester
20:15 GMT	Vardy 2', (yellow card) 37'; Soumaré (yellow card) 22'; El Khannouss 61'; Daka 90'	Report	Coufal (yellow card) 45+2'; Álvarez (yellow card) 76'; Füllkrug 90+3'	Stadium: King Power Stadium; Attendance: 30,947; Referee: Josh Smith
Note: Fixture was initially scheduled for a 19:45 kick-off, but was moved for live Amazon Prime Video broadcast.

9 December 2024 15	West Ham United	2–1	Wolverhampton Wanderers	Stratford
20:00 GMT	Emerson (yellow card) 45'; Soler (yellow card) 50'; Souček 54'; Bowen 72', (yellow card) 90+10'; Fabiański (yellow card) 90+4'; Rodríguez (yellow card) 90+5'	Report	Cunha (yellow card) 45+1'; Doherty (yellow card) 49', (goal) 69'; João Gomes (yellow card) 63'; Lemina (yellow card) 90+10'	Stadium: London Stadium; Attendance: 62,435; Referee: John Brooks
Note: Fixture was initially scheduled for 7 December, but was moved for live Sky Sports broadcast.

16 December 2024 16	Bournemouth	1–1	West Ham United	Bournemouth
20:00 GMT	Ünal 90'	Report	Soler (yellow card) 23'; Álvarez (yellow card) 62'; Paquetá 87' (pen.)	Stadium: Vitality Stadium; Attendance: 11,204; Referee: Chris Kavanagh
Note: Fixture was initially scheduled for 14 December, but was moved for live Sky Sports broadcast. On 30 October, the fixture date was changed again due to Crystal Palace reaching the EFL Cup quarter-finals.

21 December 2024 17	West Ham United	1–1	Brighton & Hove Albion	Stratford
15:00 BST	Paquetá (yellow card) 17'; Mavropanos (yellow card) 35'; Kudus 58'	Report	Veltman (yellow card) 45+3'; Wieffer 51'; Estupiñán (yellow card) 84'	Stadium: London Stadium; Attendance: 62,460; Referee: Robert Jones

26 December 2024 18	Southampton	0–1	West Ham United	Southampton
15:00 GMT	Wood (yellow card) 29'	Report	Rodríguez (yellow card) 53'; Souček (yellow card) 56'; Bowen 59'	Stadium: St Mary's Stadium; Attendance: 31,059; Referee: Lewis Smith

29 December 2024 19	West Ham United	0–5	Liverpool	Stratford
17:15 GMT		Report	Díaz 30'; Gakpo 40'; Salah 44'; Alexander-Arnold 54'; Jota 84'	Stadium: London Stadium; Attendance: 62,476; Referee: Anthony Taylor
Note: Fixture was initially scheduled for a 15:00 kick-off, but was moved for live Sky Sports broadcast.

4 January 2025 20	Manchester City	4–1	West Ham United	Manchester
15:00 GMT	Coufal 10' (o.g.); Kovačić (yellow card) 28'; Haaland 42', 55'; Foden 58'; Walker (yellow card) 64'	Report	Füllkrug (yellow card) 14', (goal) 71'	Stadium: Etihad Stadium; Attendance: 51,280; Referee: Michael Salisbury

14 January 2025 21	West Ham United	3–2	Fulham	Stratford
19:30 GMT	Soler 31'; Souček 33', (yellow card) 66'; Paquetá (yellow card) 53', (goal) 67'; Wan-Bissaka (yellow card) 70'	Report	Castagne (yellow card) 44'; Iwobi 51', 78'; Lukić (yellow card) 65'; Jiménez (yellow card) 90+7'	Stadium: London Stadium; Attendance: 62,456; Referee: Craig Pawson
Note: Fixture was initially scheduled for a 19:45 kick-off, but was moved for live TNT Sports broadcast.

18 January 2025 22	West Ham United	0–2	Crystal Palace	Stratford
15:00 BST	Álvarez (yellow card) 34'; Mavropanos (yellow card) 46' (yellow-red card) 80'	Report	Mateta 48', 89' (pen.)	Stadium: London Stadium; Attendance: 62,469; Referee: Thomas Bramall

26 January 2025 23	Aston Villa	1–1	West Ham United	Birmingham
16:30 GMT	Ramsey 8'; Tielemans (yellow card) 45+5'; Rogers (yellow card) 64'	Report	Cresswell (yellow card) 45+5'; Souček (yellow card) 63'; Álvarez (yellow card) 68'; Emerson 70'	Stadium: Villa Park; Attendance: 41,628; Referee: Peter Bankes
Note: Fixture was initially scheduled for 25 January, but was moved for live Sky Sports broadcast.

3 February 2025 24	Chelsea	2–1	West Ham United	Fulham
20:00 GMT	James (yellow card) 57'; Neto 64'; Fernández (yellow card) 67'; Palmer (yellow card) 68'; Wan-Bissaka 74' (o.g.)	Report	Bowen 42'; Irving (yellow card) 76'	Stadium: Stamford Bridge; Attendance: 39,459; Referee: Stuart Attwell
Note: Fixture was initially scheduled for 1 February, but was moved for live Sky Sports broadcast.

15 February 2025 25	West Ham United	0–1	Brentford	Stratford
15:00 BST	Souček (yellow card) 28'	Report	Schade 4'; Damsgaard (yellow card) 32'	Stadium: London Stadium; Attendance: 62,467; Referee: Darren England

22 February 2025 26	Arsenal	0–1	West Ham United	Holloway
15:00 GMT	Lewis-Skelly (red card) 73'; Partey (yellow card) 86'	Report	Bowen 44'; Todibo (yellow card) 61'; Scarles (yellow card) 78'; Ward-Prowse (yellow card) 90+9'	Stadium: Emirates Stadium; Attendance: 60,262; Referee: Craig Pawson

27 February 2025 27	West Ham United	2–0	Leicester City	Stratford
20:00 GMT	Souček 21'; Vestergaard 43' (o.g.)	Report		Stadium: London Stadium; Attendance: 62,455; Referee: Anthony Taylor
Note: Fixture was initially scheduled for 25 February, but was moved for live TNT Sports broadcast.

10 March 2025 28	West Ham United	0–1	Newcastle United	Stratford
20:00 GMT		Report	Bruno Guimarães 63'; Burn (yellow card) 84'	Stadium: London Stadium; Attendance: 62,463; Referee: Michael Salisbury
Note: Fixture was initially scheduled for 8 March, but was moved for live Sky Sports broadcast.

15 March 2025 29	Everton	1–1	West Ham United	Liverpool
15:00 GMT	Chermiti (yellow card) 85'; O'Brien 90+1'	Report	Todibo (yellow card) 45+2'; Souček 67'; Paquetá (yellow card) 81'	Stadium: Goodison Park; Attendance: 39,343; Referee: Darren Bond

1 April 2025 30	Wolverhampton Wanderers	1–0	West Ham United	Wolverhampton
19:45 BST	Larsen 21'; André (yellow card) 28'; Sá (yellow card) 31'; João Gomes (yellow card) 80'; Doherty (yellow card) 88'	Report	Mavropanos (yellow card) 31'; Füllkrug (yellow card) 73'	Stadium: Molineux Stadium; Attendance: 30,537; Referee: Tony Harrington

5 April 2025 31	West Ham United	2–2	Bournemouth	Stratford
15:00 BST	Füllkrug 61'; Bowen 68'; Ward-Prowse (yellow card) 78'; Kudus (yellow card) 84'	Report	Cook (yellow card) 28'; Evanilson 38', 79'; Smith (yellow card) 60'	Stadium: London Stadium; Attendance: 62,459; Referee: Tim Robinson

13 April 2025 32	Liverpool	2–1	West Ham United	Liverpool
14:00 BST	Díaz 18'; Van Dijk 89'	Report	Robertson 86' (o.g.); Coufal (yellow card) 90+6'; Paquetá (yellow card) 90+8'	Stadium: Anfield; Attendance: 60,376; Referee: Andrew Madley
Note: Fixture was initially scheduled for 12 April, but was moved for live Sky Sports broadcast.

19 April 2025 33	West Ham United	1–1	Southampton	Stratford
15:00 BST	Coufal (yellow card) 23'; Bowen 47'; Kilman (yellow card) 83'	Report	Onuachu (yellow card) 35'; Ugochukwu 90+3'	Stadium: London Stadium; Attendance: 62,461; Referee: Andrew Kitchen

26 April 2025 34	Brighton & Hove Albion	3–2	West Ham United	Brighton and Hove
15:00 BST	Ayari 13'; Hinshelwood (yellow card) 80'; Mitoma 89'; Baleba 90+2'	Report	Mavropanos (yellow card) 29'; Kudus 48'; Souček 83'	Stadium: Falmer Stadium; Attendance: 31,499; Referee: Darren England

4 May 2025 35	West Ham United	1–1	Tottenham Hotspur	Stratford
14:00 BST	Kudus (yellow card) 19'; Bowen 28'; Paquetá (yellow card) 73'	Report	Davies (yellow card) 13'; Odobert 15'; Tel (yellow card) 88'	Stadium: London Stadium; Attendance: 62,468; Referee: Michael Oliver
Note: Fixture was initially scheduled for 3 May, but was moved due to Tottenham's UEFA Europa League involvement on the preceding Thursday.

11 May 2025 36	Manchester United	0–2	West Ham United	Trafford
14:15 BST		Report	Souček 26'; Bowen 57'; Cresswell (yellow card) 61'	Stadium: Old Trafford; Attendance: 73,804; Referee: Jarred Gillett
Note: Fixture was initially scheduled for 10 May, but was moved due to Manchester United's UEFA Europa League involvement on the preceding Thursday.

18 May 2025 37	West Ham United	1–2	Nottingham Forest	Stratford
14:15 BST	Coufal (yellow card) 45+2'; Rodríguez (yellow card) 57'; Paquetá (yellow card) 76'; Bowen 86'; Todibo (yellow card) 90'; Álvarez (yellow card) 90+15'; Soler (yellow card) 90+16'	Report	Gibbs-White 11'; Anderson (yellow card) 52'; Milenković 61'; Murillo (yellow card) 90+15'; Morato (yellow card) 90+15'	Stadium: London Stadium; Attendance: 62,466; Referee: Sam Barrott
Note: Fixture was initially scheduled for a 15:00 kick-off, but was moved for live Sky Sports broadcast.

25 May 2025 38	Ipswich Town	1–3	West Ham United	Ipswich
16:00 BST	Broadhead 52'; Delap (yellow card) 81'	Report	Kilman (yellow card) 35'; Ward-Prowse 43'; Bowen 55'; Kudus 87'	Stadium: Portman Road; Attendance: 29,771; Referee: Tim Robinson

=== FA Cup ===
West Ham United entered the FA Cup at the third round stage, and were drawn away to Aston Villa. Their last FA cup game against Villa was a 1–0 win in a sixth-round tie in March 1980 at the Boleyn Ground en route to winning the 1980 FA Cup final.

Win Draw Loss Fixtures

10 January 2025 Third round	Aston Villa	2–1	West Ham United	Birmingham
20:00 GMT	Rogers (yellow card) 57', (goal) 76'; Onana 71'	Report	Paquetá 9'; Kudus (yellow card) 29'	Stadium: Villa Park; Attendance: 40,989; Referee: Tim Robinson

=== EFL Cup ===
The Hammers entered the competition in the second round, and were drawn at home to Bournemouth. They were then drawn away to Liverpool in the third round.

Win Draw Loss Fixtures

28 August 2024 Second round	West Ham United	1–0	Bournemouth	Stratford
19:45 BST	Todibo (yellow card) 28'; Wan-Bissaka (yellow card) 52'; Fabiański (yellow card) 78'; Bowen 88'	Report	Scott (yellow card) 30'; Evanilson (yellow card) 66'	Stadium: London Stadium; Attendance: 47,381; Referee: Peter Bankes

25 September 2024 Third round	Liverpool	5–1	West Ham United	Liverpool
20:00 BST	Jota 25', 49'; Quansah (yellow card) 63'; Salah 74'; Gakpo 90', 90+3'	Report	Quansah 21' (o.g.); Álvarez (yellow card) 67' (yellow-red card) 76'; Paquetá (yellow card) 70'	Stadium: Anfield; Attendance: 60,044; Referee: Andrew Madley

== Statistics ==
=== Appearances and goals ===
As of match played 25 May 2025

Players with no appearances are not included on the list
Italics indicate a loaned in player

No.	Pos	Nat	Player	Total		Premier League		FA Cup		EFL Cup	
No.	Pos	Nat	Player	Apps	Goals	Apps	Goals	Apps	Goals	Apps	Goals
1	GK	(Poland) POL	Łukasz Fabiański	17	0	13+1	0	1	0	2	0
3	DF	(England) ENG	Aaron Cresswell	20	0	10+8	0	0+1	0	1	0
4	MF	(Spain) ESP	Carlos Soler	33	1	14+17	1	0+1	0	1	0
5	DF	(Czech Republic) CZE	Vladimír Coufal	25	0	11+11	0	0+1	0	2	0
7	FW	(Netherlands) NED	Crysencio Summerville	22	1	7+12	1	1	0	2	0
8	MF	(England) ENG	James Ward-Prowse	16	1	12+3	1	0	0	1	0
9	FW	(Jamaica) JAM	Michail Antonio	15	1	11+3	1	0	0	0+1	0
10	MF	(Brazil) BRA	Lucas Paquetá	36	5	27+6	4	1	1	0+2	0
11	FW	(Germany) GER	Niclas Füllkrug	20	3	6+12	3	1	0	1	0
14	MF	(Ghana) GHA	Mohammed Kudus	35	5	31+1	5	1	0	0+2	0
15	DF	(Greece) GRE	Konstantinos Mavropanos	35	0	21+12	0	1	0	0+1	0
17	FW	(Brazil) BRA	Luis Guilherme	13	0	1+11	0	0+1	0	0	0
18	FW	(England) ENG	Danny Ings	17	1	1+14	1	0+1	0	1	0
19	MF	(Mexico) MEX	Edson Álvarez	31	0	20+8	0	1	0	2	0
20	FW	(England) ENG	Jarrod Bowen	36	14	34	13	0	0	2	1
23	GK	(France) FRA	Alphonse Areola	26	0	25+1	0	0	0	0	0
24	MF	(Argentina) ARG	Guido Rodríguez	24	0	16+7	0	0	0	0+1	0
25	DF	(France) FRA	Jean-Clair Todibo	29	0	20+7	0	0	0	2	0
26	DF	(England) ENG	Maximilian Kilman	41	0	38	0	1	0	2	0
28	MF	(Czech Republic) CZE	Tomáš Souček	38	9	30+5	9	1	0	2	0
29	DF	(England) ENG	Aaron Wan-Bissaka	38	2	35+1	2	1	0	1	0
33	DF	(Italy) ITA	Emerson Palmieri	32	2	26+5	2	0	0	0+1	0
34	FW	(Republic of Ireland) IRL	Evan Ferguson	8	0	1+7	0	0	0	0	0
39	MF	(Scotland) SCO	Andy Irving	11	0	1+9	0	0	0	0+1	0
42	DF	(England) ENG	Kaelan Casey	1	0	0+1	0	0	0	0	0
57	DF	(England) ENG	Oliver Scarles	16	0	7+8	0	1	0	0	0
61	MF	(England) ENG	Lewis Orford	2	0	0+2	0	0	0	0	0

=== Goalscorers ===
As of match played 25 May 2025

Rank	Pos.	No.	Nat.	Player	Premier League	FA Cup	EFL Cup	Total
1	FW	20	(England)	Jarrod Bowen	13	0	1	14
2	MF	28	(Czech Republic)	Tomáš Souček	9	0	0	9
3=	MF	10	(Brazil)	Lucas Paquetá	4	1	0	5
3=	FW	14	(Ghana)	Mohammed Kudus	5	0	0	5
5	FW	11	(Germany)	Niclas Füllkrug	3	0	0	3
6=	DF	29	(England)	Aaron Wan-Bissaka	2	0	0	2
6=	DF	33	(Italy)	Emerson	2	0	0	2
8=	MF	4	(Spain)	Carlos Soler	1	0	0	1
8=	FW	7	(Netherlands)	Crysencio Summerville	1	0	0	1
8=	MF	8	(England)	James Ward-Prowse	1	0	0	1
8=	FW	9	(Jamaica)	Michail Antonio	1	0	0	1
8=	FW	18	(England)	Danny Ings	1	0	0	1
Own goals					3	0	1	4
Totals					46	1	2	49

=== Discipline ===
As of match played 25 May 2025

No.	Pos.	Player	Premier League			FA Cup			EFL Cup			Total		
No.	Pos.	Player	Yellow card	(yellow card) (yellow-red card)	Red card	Yellow card	(yellow card) (yellow-red card)	Red card	Yellow card	(yellow card) (yellow-red card)	Red card	Yellow card	(yellow card) (yellow-red card)	Red card
1	GK	(Poland) Łukasz Fabiański	2	0	0	0	0	0	1	0	0	3	0	0
3	DF	(England) Aaron Cresswell	3	0	0	0	0	0	0	0	0	3	0	0
4	MF	(Spain) Carlos Soler	6	0	0	0	0	0	0	0	0	6	0	0
5	DF	(Czech Republic) Vladimír Coufal	5	0	0	0	0	0	0	0	0	5	0	0
7	FW	(Netherlands) Crysencio Summerville	2	0	0	0	0	0	0	0	0	2	0	0
8	MF	(England) James Ward-Prowse	2	0	0	0	0	0	0	0	0	2	0	0
9	FW	(Jamaica) Michail Antonio	1	0	0	0	0	0	0	0	0	1	0	0
10	MF	(Brazil) Lucas Paquetá	9	0	0	0	0	0	1	0	0	10	0	0
11	FW	(Germany) Niclas Füllkrug	1	0	0	0	0	0	0	0	0	1	0	0
14	FW	(Ghana) Mohammed Kudus	2	0	1	1	0	0	0	0	0	3	0	1
15	DF	(Greece) Konstantinos Mavropanos	3	1	0	0	0	0	0	0	0	3	1	0
19	MF	(Mexico) Edson Álvarez	7	1	0	0	0	0	0	1	0	7	2	0
20	FW	(England) Jarrod Bowen	1	0	0	0	0	0	0	0	0	1	0	0
24	MF	(Argentina) Guido Rodríguez	6	0	0	0	0	0	0	0	0	6	0	0
25	DF	(France) Jean-Clair Todibo	3	0	0	0	0	0	1	0	0	4	0	0
26	DF	(England) Maximilian Kilman	5	0	0	0	0	0	0	0	0	5	0	0
28	MF	(Czech Republic) Tomáš Souček	8	0	0	0	0	0	0	0	0	8	0	0
29	DF	(England) Aaron Wan-Bissaka	1	0	0	0	0	0	1	0	0	2	0	0
33	DF	(Italy) Emerson Palmieri	5	0	0	0	0	0	0	0	0	5	0	0
39	MF	(Scotland) Andy Irving	2	0	0	0	0	0	0	0	0	2	0	0
57	DF	(England) Oliver Scarles	1	0	0	0	0	0	0	0	0	1	0	0
Totals			75	2	1	1	0	0	4	1	0	80	3	1

=== Clean sheets ===
As of match played 18 May 2025

The list is sorted by shirt number when total clean sheets are equal.

Rank	No.	Nat	Player	Premier League	FA Cup	EFL Cup	Total
1	23	(France)	Alphonse Areola	5	0	0	5
2	1	(Poland)	Łukasz Fabiański	2	0	1	3
Totals				7	0	1	8
