= Siege of Navarino (1572) =

Military engagement between Holy league and Ottomans

- Part of the Ottoman–Habsburg wars and Fourth Ottoman–Venetian War
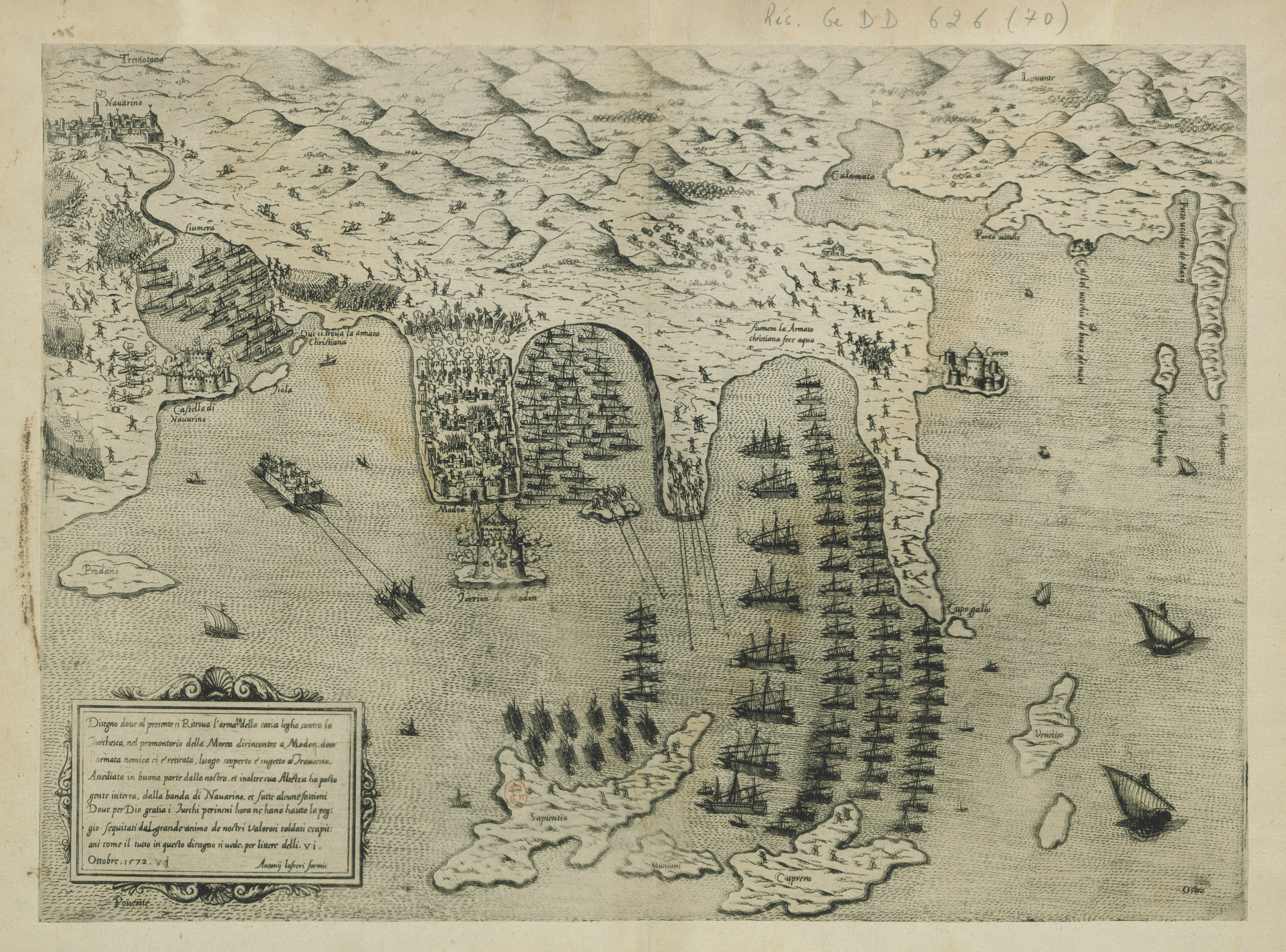
- Depiction of the Holy League campaign in Morea
| Date | 21 September – 7 October 1572 |
| Location | Navarino, Morea, Ionian Sea |
| Result | Ottoman victory |

Belligerents
| Holy League: Spanish Empire; Venice; Genoa; Savoy; Tuscany; Order of Saint Stephen; Order of Malta; Papal States | Ottoman Empire |

Commanders and leaders
| (Spanish Empire) John of Austria (Spanish Empire) Álvaro de Bazán (Spanish Empire) Alexander Farnese (Venice) Giacomo Foscarini (Venice) Giacomo Soranzo | Occhiali |

Strength
| 194 galleys 45 galleons 8 galleasses 25,000 soldiers | 225 galleys and galliots 20,000 soldiers |

Casualties and losses
| 750 killed | 1 ship lost |

The siege of Navarino was a military engagement between the Holy League fleet, led by John of Austria, who besieged the Ottoman garrison in Navarino as part of an operation to destroy the Ottoman fleet built after the Battle of Lepanto. The operation ended in failure by a variety of reasons, leading to the withdrawal of the Christian armada. Miguel de Cervantes, the famous Spanish writer, participated in the siege of Navarino.

== Background ==
After the skirmish at Cerigo Channel, where Marcantonio Colonna repelled the rebuilt Turkish fleet, John of Austria and Álvaro de Bazán managed to link up with Colonna without being obstructed by the Ottoman admiral Occhiali. The League's fleet assembled thus fully at Corfu, numbering over two hundred ships and 25,000 men, leaving only Giovanni Andrea Doria with 49 galleys in Sicily to cover their rear. After discussions with the Venetian captains regarding their galley crews, which they only allowed to reinforce with Papal soldiers instead of Spanish marine infantry, John of Austria ordered to sail off. He sent Rodrigo de Mendoza with the League's 45 galleons and carracks to Zante while he sailed himself for Cephalonia with the rowing vessels, departing on September 8.

On September 12, they anchored at Cephalonia, where two galley slaves who had escaped from the Ottoman fleet warned that Occhiali was unwilling to engage in direct combat due to his fleet's inferior artillery. Three days later, they passed Astanfaria, whose monastery Uluj had destroyed after his escape from Lepanto. Don John planned to sail by night and surprise the Ottoman fleet before it reached Navarino, but Occhiali had left it behind. Scout frigates soon reported that Occhiali had taken refuge with his fleet at both Navarino and Modon, where his crews had been severely weakened by an epidemic. This presented them an opportunity to destroy the new Ottoman fleet.

== Previous movements ==
The allied forces stealthily made their way to Sapientza by night, planning to blockade Modona and isolate it from Navarino, thus dividing the Turkish fleet. However, Occhiali realized in time and moved both squadrons to Modona. Only Colonna with a small squad caught up with the Navarino fleet and pursued it for a distance, though he was forced to retreat due to the menace of fifty galleys from the Modona fleet, commanded by Occhiali. The League's fleet then approached Modon as a unit, so Occhiali deployed his entire armada in battle formation, only to hastily return to port when the Christian vanguard began bombarding his fleet.

Noting that he could not dislodge Occhiali from Modon due to the rugged coast and local defenses, John of Austria ordered his forces to anchor at Sapientza. When they turned their sterns to him, Occhiali once again set out with another fifty galleys, attempting to attack them from the rear, but fled again as soon as the Christian galleys turned around. Other skirmishes occurred during those days. Occhiali tried to capture several straggling galleys from Giacomo Soranzo's squadron, but Bazán rescued them with his own squadron, forcing the Turk to retreat to avoid being surrounded. A land battle took place on the 18th while they were taking on water at nearby Corón, where Spanish arquebusiers repelled an ambush by Janissaries.

Venetian captain Giacomo Foscarini proposed taking the promontory opposite Modon, or failing that, simply raiding the bay with all of their forces, even offering to lead the attack with his own galley, reasoning that although the first few galleys would be destroyed, the enemy batteries would eventually be overwhelmed. John of Austria immediately rejected the plan, deeming it suicidal and pointing out that a few galleys sunk in the channel could clog it and cause the raid to fail. John of Austria then ordered to anchor at Navarino, where they would be better provisioned and protected. Occhiali's conditions were beginning to worsen, with a storm further damaging his position, but the Christians also saw their operations compromised as autumn drew ever closer. On September 20, Bazán drove off another Ottoman flotilla of thirty galleys, after which a group of escaped slaves and deserters reached the League's camp, reporting that Uluj had decided to concentrate his resources on over thirty galleys and leave all the others beached, using their cannons to further fortify the entrance to the bay.

== The siege ==
=== Land offensive ===
On September 20, John of Austria sent twenty galleys to Zante under Giovanni Mocenigo to tow the galleons, wanting to use their troops and siege equipment, although another storm delayed the voyage by six days. The admirals discussed at length how to attack Modon, ultimately deciding to assail with the aid of a floating battery similar to the one García de Toledo had invented in the capture of Mahdia. Tuscan engineer Giuseppe Bonello was commissioned to build a fortified platform with ten cannons on two galleys, but the plan was abandoned when it was deemed that the platform would be too impractical and unstable. It was also proposed to employ the entire fleet's artillery to be used in a massive bombardment, which would have overwhelmed the Ottoman positions, but the Venetians and Papals objected, not trusting that their ships would resist against land batteries.

Scouts brought the Ottoman castle of Navarino to the League's attention, so the Venetians urged the League to seize it to establish a land base, stating that the former Venetian stronghold would be far less defended than Modon. On the night of October 2, John of Austria landed a contingent of 5,000 Spaniards and 3,000 Italians at Navarino, commanded by Alexander Farnese. They attempted for three days to breach the castle, which proved resistant due to its natural defenses and artillery. When Don John himself went to inspect the position, he immediately decided to abandon the siege, arguing that they would spend more time taking the fortress than it was worth. The Ottoman Beylerbey of Greece also arrived with 20,000 cavalry to relieve the position, so Don John ordered Farnese and his men to re-embark. Autumn was arriving and supplies were running out, so John of Austria finally ordered the abandonment of Navarino and left Occhiali a seemingly clear path to Constantinople, hoping to ambush him at sea when he came out.

=== Naval battle ===
On October 7, the anniversary of the Battle of Lepanto, the Christian rowing vessels sailed for Modon to make a final reconnaissance, while the larger ships sailed for Zante. Don John's plan then seemed to have some success, as a ship from Corfu, either Spanish or Venetian depending on the account, also passed by Modon and attracted the attention of Occhiali, who sent twenty or twenty-five galleys in pursuit. Seeing this, John of Austria ordered his fleet to form up and sail towards Sapientza to position itself between the galleys and the mainland, thus isolating the Ottomans from their base. Occhiali also sailed from Modon with another fifteen galleys, and a battle ensued. Don John ordered Soranzo to corner Occhiali against the sea while Bazán and Juan de Cardona pursued the initial galleys, but Occhiali immediately realized the outcome and fled back to Modon, a move imitated by all of the Ottoman galleys.

However, a large Ottoman galley turned around while Bazán pursued it with his own flagship, La Loba, and a fierce battle ensued between the two. The Turkish galley carried 250 soldiers and 100 Janissaries, but Bazán managed to capture it at the cost of six dead and thirty wounded, killing a hundred Turks and taking twice that number prisoner, and freeing 220 Christian galley slaves. It was then discovered that it was commanded by the young Mahomet Bey, Sanjak of Mytilene and son of Hasan Pasha of Algiers, and therefore grandson of Hayreddin Barbarossa and son-in-law of Dragut, which caused much expectation. However, Hasan had been killed by his own revolting slave galleys before Bazán could capture him. His galley was incorporated into the fleet, and later placed at the service of Spain in Naples, under the name La Presa. After the battle, John of Austria decided to attempt Foscarini's plan and storm the port of Modon with his entire fleet, but this time too there was no agreement among the Christian admirals. Finally, with the arrival of storms, John gave the order to end the campaign and set sail the next day for the Christian bases.

== Aftermath ==
On day 9 they arrived in Zante, where they retrieved the sailing ships, and in Gomenizza they found a late reinforcement of thirteen galleys led by Doria and Gonzalo Fernández de Córdoba, grandson of the Great Captain. In Corfu the armada disbanded, with John of Austria arriving in Messina on October 26 and Colonna continuing towards Rome. Not having achieved anything in spite of the great expenses, discord among the members of the League reached its peak. Foscarini, who would have to endure the operation's failure in his homeland, accused the Spanish of sabotaging it and Don John of being more interested in following the Dutch Revolt than the wars in the Mediterranean. Colonna was also dissatisfied with John of Austria and vice versa, with the Spaniard accusing him of favoring Venice too much.

Great promises were made for the future, with Don John, Colonna and Foscarini vowing to perform better the following year, while pope Gregory XIII recommended expanding the Holy League's navy. Philip II began a shipbuilding program to make this a reality, but the Venetians did not follow suit. Soon after, Venice, with constant French mediation thanks to the Franco-Ottoman alliance, independently signed a peace treaty with the Ottoman Empire. Although John of Austria did not believe the peace would last long, he agreed with Philip II and the other Spanish admirals to continue the war alone, this time focusing on North Africa, close to Spain. In response to an attack on Apulia by Occhiali, they launched a campaign against Barbary. Bazán had recommended conquering Algiers, but Don John considered Tunis a better option. It was chosen and conquered soon after, although held only briefly.

== Bibliography ==
- Rosell, Cayetano (1853). Historia del combate naval de Lepanto. Real Academia de la Historia.
- Anderson, Roger Charles (1952). Naval wars in the Levant, 1559-1853. Princeton University Press.
- Fernández Duro, Cesáreo (1896). Armada Española, desde la unión de los reinos de Castilla y Aragón, tomo II. Madrid: Instituto de Historia Naval.
- Rodríguez González, Agustín Ramón (2021). Lepanto, la batalla decisiva (in Spanish). Spain: Sekotia Ediciones. ISBN 978-84-1675-090-0.
- Setton, Kenneth (1984). The Papacy and the Levant, 1204-1571. American Philosophical Society.
