= Juan de Cardona y Requesens =

Spanish admiral

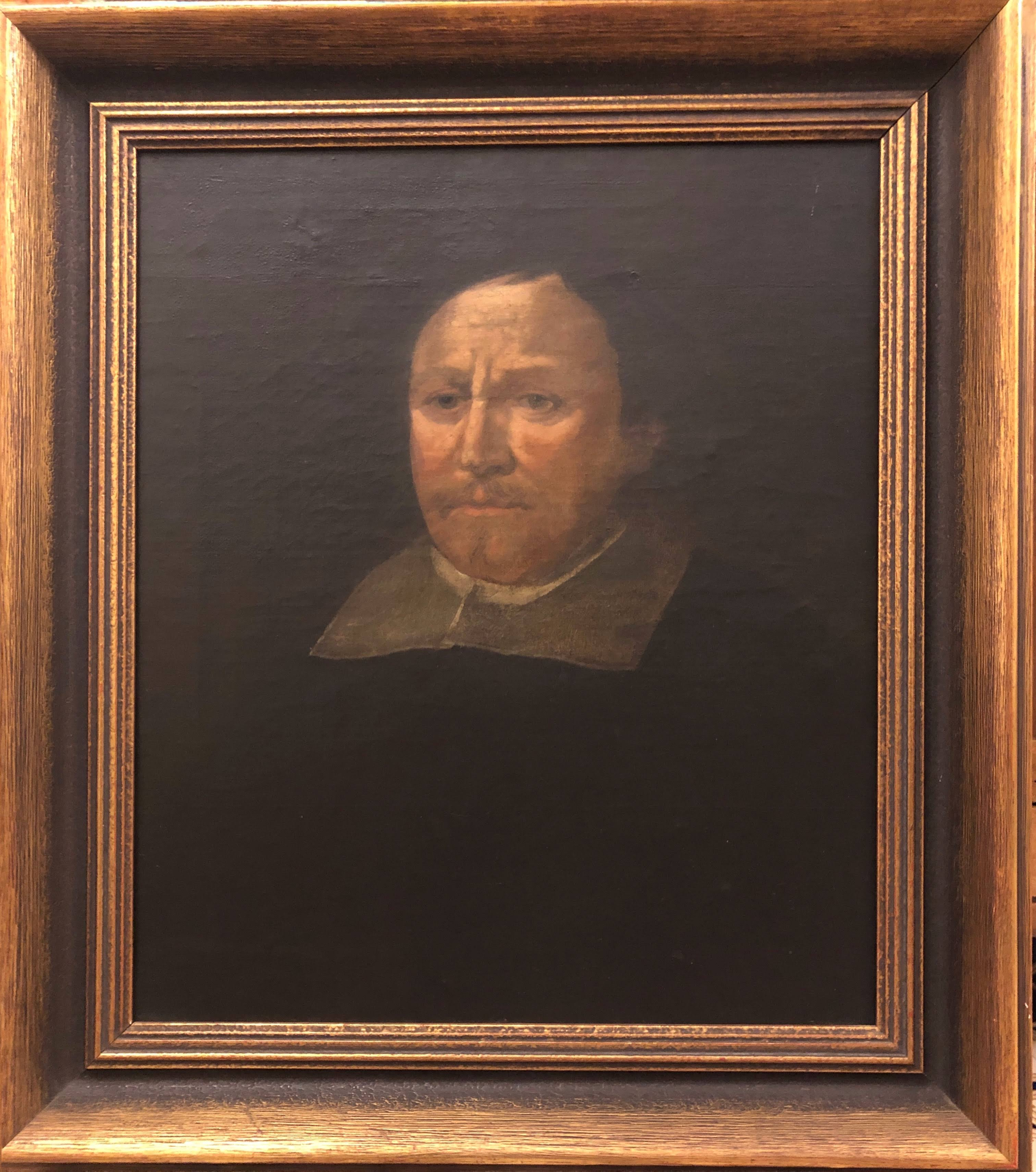
- Born: 1530
- Died: 1609 (aged 78–79); Pamplona, Spain
- Military career
- Allegiance: Spanish Empire
- Service years: 1557–1609
- Rank: Admiral

Juan de Cardona y Requesens (1530–1609), Baron of Sant Boi, was a Spanish admiral and politician. He served as a captain of naval squads in Sicily and Naples, as well as member of the Council of State and Viceroy of Navarre.

== Early life ==
He was the grandson of Antonio de Cardona y Enríquez and Juan Ramón Folch IV de Cardona, effective uniting two of the most notable families in the Kingdom of Aragon. He received a varied Renaissance education, and for a time was a member of the music school of the Escolania de Montserrat.

== Career ==
In 1552 he served in the land army Holy Roman Emperor Charles V, being present in the failed siege of Metz. Five years later he was in charge of communicating Charles' abdication in Mallorca, where he swore loyalty to his son Philip II in a ceremony authorized to diverge from the traditional rites. A more conservative ceremony was held in 1564.

Cardona participated in the Battle of Djerba, being captured along with many other captains, although freed later. He was then captain-general of the galley squad of Naples, participating in the relief of the Great Siege of Malta in 1565. He was later part of the Holy League armada in the Battle of Lepanto of 1571, where he faced the squad of Ottoman admiral Occhiali along with the reserve captained by Álvaro de Bazán. Victory was hard-fought, with Cardona being wounded in the leg. During the skirmish at Cerigo Channel the following year, with Marcantonio Colonna temporarily replacing the League's commander John of Austria, Cardona replaced Bazán himself. He later took part in Siege of Navarino, as well as John of Austria's conquest of Tunis.

In 1576 he was captain of the squad of Naples. He became Viceroy of Navarre from 1595 to 1602 and later again from 1603 to 1609, when he was replaced due to an illness. He died shortly after.

== Issue ==
He married Francesca Flordespina Guiso, Baroness of Galtellì in Sardinia, who gave birth to a son, Antoni.
