= Puffer =

Puffer may refer to:

- Clyde puffer, a type of cargo ship used in the Clyde estuary and off the west coast of Scotland
- Puffer, a type of circuit breaker
- Inhaler, a medical device used for delivering medication into the body via the lungs
- Puffer machine, used to detect explosives
- Puffer train, a class of patterns in automata such as Conway's Game of Life
- Pufferfish, a type of fish in family Tetraodontidae which can inflate itself as a defence mechanism
- Puffer (surname), a surname
- Supercharger for a motor car engine
- USS Puffer, two submarine vessels of the United States Navy
- Puffer, name for a particular type of German Wheellock pistol, usually from Nuremberg or Augsburg
- Puffer jacket, a type of jacket
- "Puffer", a song by indie rock/noise pop band Speedy Ortiz from Foil Deer
- Puffer (research study), online streaming service
