= Puffing =

Puffing may refer to:

- Tobacco smoking
- Puffing grain, a process used in cereal manufacturing
- Puffery, a legal term referring to promotional statements
- Solar puffing, the act of using a magnifying lens to heat cannabis for consumption

== See also ==
- Puff (disambiguation)
