= Battle of Apulia =

1573 battle in the Kingdom of Naples

Battle of Apulia (1573)
- Part of Spanish–Ottoman wars
Date	July – August 1573
Location	Apulia
Result	Ottoman victory

Belligerents
Ottoman Empire	Spanish Empire: Kingdom of Naples

Commanders and leaders
Piali Pasha	Unknown

Strength
Unknown	Unknown

Casualties and losses
Unknown	Unknown

The Battle of Apulia, in 1573 was a battle led by Piali Pasha against the Kingdom of Naples coast of Apulia, which was under the rule of the Spanish Empire.

== Background ==
The Ottoman–Venetian War (1570–1573) ended with the Treaty signed in Constantinople of the Holy Alliance on March 7, 1573, and the Holy League was effectively dissolved. Thereupon, the Ottoman navy targeted not the Republic of Venice with which peace was made during the 1573 campaign season, but the Kingdom of Naples lands that were part of the Spanish Empire.

Piali Pasha, who carried out the naval preparations together with Occhiali and was re-appointed as the navy commander, set sail for the Mediterranean on June 3, 1573.

== Battle ==
220 pieces (208 galley and 12 barges), After reaching Avlonia, the Ottoman navy crossed the Strait of Otranto and landed on the Apulia shores of the Kingdom of Naples and captured Kastro castle (the same castle had been captured in 1537 during Lütfi Pasha's Pulya expedition). After loading many prisoners and booty captured during the plunder of the region onto ships, the Ottoman navy advanced to the Messina Strait, but due to adverse weather conditions, they gave up going to the Naples and Sicily coasts. Returning to Avlonia, Piali Pasha stopped by Nafpaktos and Pylos and fortified the Pylos castle, leaving Occhiali in charge of it with a few galleys. The fleet returned to Istanbul on November 1, 1573.

With this expedition, the Ottoman navy showed that it had left behind the negative effects of the Lepanto defeat of two years earlier. Indeed; In the expedition of 1572, the fleet that did not sail south of Morea, appeared in Italy waters again in 1573, and in 1574, it sailed further west and conquered Tunisia.

== Aftermath ==
Taking advantage of the presence of the Ottoman navy on the coast of Apulia, the Spanish navy under the command of John of Austria targeted the city of Tunis (which had been annexed to the Ottoman lands in 1569) and captured it on October 10, 1573.

Thereupon, the main goal of the Ottoman navy in the following campaign season (1574) was Liberation of Tunis from occupation.

The Ottoman Empire, which essentially ended the war with Venice with the peace treaty signed on March 15, 1573, had the opportunity to focus its forces on the Spanish Empire by taking advantage of the de facto dissolution of the Holy League formed in 1571.
