= Skirmish at Cerigo Channel =

1572 naval battle of the Ottoman–Habsburg wars

- Part of the Spanish–Ottoman wars, the Ottoman–Habsburg wars and the Fourth Ottoman–Venetian War
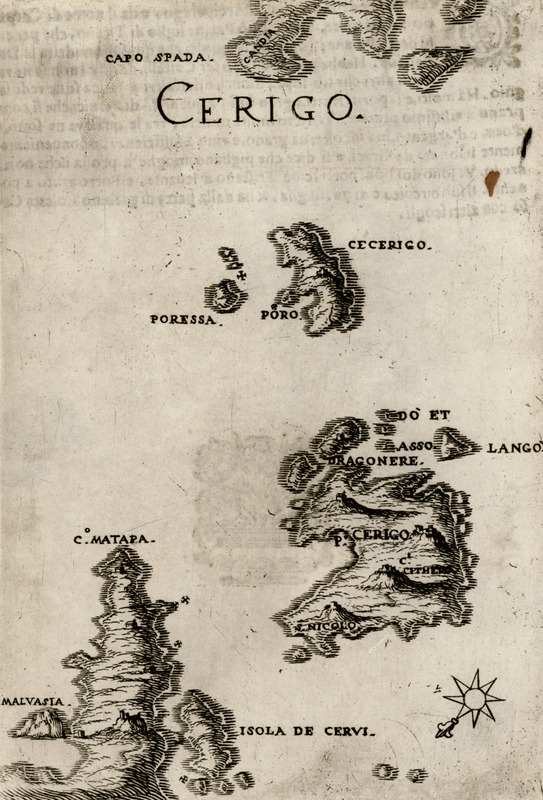
- 1658 map of Cerigo waters, south to north.
Date	7–10 August 1572
Location	Cerigo, Morea, Ionian Sea
Result	Holy League victory

Belligerents
Holy League: Spanish Empire; Venice; Genoa; Savoy; Tuscany; Order of Saint Stephen; Order of Malta; Papal States	Ottoman Empire: Regency of Algiers

Commanders and leaders
(Papal States) Marcantonio Colonna (Spanish Empire) Juan de Cardona (Republic of Venice) Giacomo Foscarini (Republic of Venice) Giacomo Soranzo (Order of Knights of the Hospital of Saint John of Jerusalem) Pietro Giustiniani	Occhiali

Strength
139 galleys 6 galleasses 20 galleons and carracks	225 galleys 5 mahons

Casualties and losses
Minor	Significant

The skirmish at Cerigo Channel was a battle between a fleet of the Holy League, led by Marcantonio Colonna in absence of John of Austria, and the Ottoman armada built after the Battle of Lepanto, captained by Occhiali.

The skirmish involved much maneuvering. Despite the vast Ottoman advantage in numbers, the Christian fleet employed the heavy artillery of its galleasses and sailing ships to even the field, eventually putting the Ottomans flight twice, although they were unable to exploit their advantage due to unfavorable wind. Colonna later focused on linking with John of Austria, after which they routed Occhiali again. The League later disbanded during the siege of Navarino.

== Background ==
One year after Lepanto, the Holy League began preparations for its next campaign, this time under new pope Gregorius XIII. The two biggest members of the League, Philip II of Spain and the Venetian Senate, ensured their support, the former claiming full dedication and the second due to Venice's impossibility to sign peace with Ottoman Sultan Selim II at the time. In spite of this, the death of Pius V had weakened considerably cohesion within the League, as every side pushed for operations closer to their own domains. Philip was interested in taking the Barbary corsair bases of Algiers and Tunis, while the Venetians had their sights on the east. However, in order to eliminate friction, Venice replaced Sebastiano Venier for Giacomo Foscarini due to its clashes with John of Austria.

In early July, the Holy League gathered in Corfu without John of Austria, who had been ordered by Philip to remain in Sicily due to requirements of the Dutch Revolt, the Barbary privateers and a possible Franco-Ottoman attack. Philip feared even a change of sides by Venice if the Spanish attacked Algiers. After lengthy negotiations, Don John requested the league to advance without him. The fleet set off Messina on July 6, reaching Corfu on 15. The Holy League had planned to hound the Turks and draw the Ottomans to another naval battle, following reports that the newly rebuilt Ottoman armada was mostly composed of badly armed galleys and inexperienced crews due to the huge casualties in Lepanto.

On the Ottoman side, France and Vizier Sokollu Mehmet Pasha encouraged Selim II to continue the war. The Sultan brought the main survivor of Lepanto, Occhiali (now known as Kilic Ali, from kilic or "sword"), and promoted him to admiral. Occhiali's first destiny, at the head of the new fleet, was to check on Greece to solve local rebellions against Ottoman rule fostered by the victory of Lepanto. He also sacked the countryside of the Venetian colonies of Tine and Cerigo and considered an invasion of Candia. Warned about these movements, Venetian captain Giacomo Foscarini urged the interine commander of the League, the veteran of the tercios and Papal admiral Marcantonio Colonna, to act against him.

== Previous movements ==
Colonna moved the fleet to Gomenizza on July 20, where they repulsed an attack from Turkish cavalry. He received on 28 a message from John of Austria, who intended to set off Messina with 64 vessels, leaving behind 24 under the command of Giovanni Andrea Doria along with promised reinforcements. Don John announced his arrival in some weeks and ordered not to start yet the Turkish enterprise, but to focus on protecting the Venetian ownings. Given that Foscarini's petition did not contravene these orders, Colonna continued forward and headed for southern Greece, recruiting by Cephalonia thirteen Venetian galleys from Candia captained by Marco Quirini.

The Christians continued travel, sailing already in battle formation as they had done up to Lepanto, with Colonna in the center followed by Foscarini and Gil de Andrada, Giacomo Soranzo and Antonio Canale in the right and left wings, and Juan de Cardona in the reserve. They towed their galleasses and sailing ships due to the former's slowness and the latter's lack of convenient wind to move. The fleet stopped by Zante, where he found the trail of the Ottoman fleet. When Occhiali found out the Christian fleet was coming, he abandoned his plans to attack Candia and Maina and rushed to Malvasia.

The night previous to August 7 they reached the island of Cervi, north of Cerigo and west of Cape Maleas, where Colonna found out Occhiali was near with a fleet almost twice the size of his own. Finding himself less than thirty miles away, Colonna judged the battle inevitable and prepared to even the odds with his heavier ships. For his part, learning he had the advantage in numbers, Occhiali had come out of Malvasia and advanced towards Cape Maleas.

== Opposing forces ==
Morea peninsula.

The Holy League fleet at the moment of the encounter included 139 galleys, six galleasses and 20 sailing ships, like galleons and carracks, along with minor vessels like galiots and brigantines. The galleasses and ships were an important factor on their side due to their great size and heavy artillery. Furthermore, the Christian galleys had been reinforced, ordering that no galley carried less than 150 fighters on board. Among the squad leaders, Soranzo was also the replacement for Agostino Barbarigo, felled in Lepanto.

The Ottoman fleet totaled at 225 galleys and galiots, counting recently built ones, surviving ones from Lepanto and reinforcements from Barbary, along with several other minor vessels. Originally it included five mahons, Ottoman-built galleasses, although Occhiali preferred to leave them behind the day before the battle.

== Battle ==
=== First day ===
On the morning of August 7, with a northerly wind, Colonna and Occhiali formed in front of each other near Cape Malea. Both sides were expecting a westerly wind, but it did not arrive yet. The Christian fleet followed the same order of the battle as previously, with Colonna at the center with 50 galleys, Cardona behind with a thin reserve of 7 and the Venetians at the wings with 40 each, and also placed the galleasses and sailing ships forming a protective vanguard in front of them. The Ottoman fired first, although uselessly due to the great distance they had been forced to put between them and the galleasses and ships. Being aware of these ships' massive firepower, Occhiali refrained from attacking and decided to wait for his chance.

Colonna began advancing slowly with the available wind, so Occhiali kept his distance and used a smoke screen to mask his movements. The Ottoman sought a way to separate the Christian galleys from the protection of their ships so he could overwhelm them with his superior numbers. He turned his fleet leeward and approached Cervi, unsuccessfully attempting to get the Christian fleet to follow him. When the westerly wind finally appeared, Occhiali seized the opportunity and formed behind the Christian fleet, spreading his squads widely in the channel between Cervi and Cerigo. Colonna immediately ordered the fleet to turn around to face him, making the galleys and waiting for the ships and galleases to come forward once more. Occhiali had expected the Catholic vessels to become entangled in the maneuver, but instead the turn was executed in perfect order. The Ottomans fired another salvo, again useless due to the distance.

Colonna ordered to advance and attack, but upon approaching gun range again, wind suddenly vanished and left his ships and galleasses immobile, so Colonna quickly ordered the fleet altogether to stop in order not to break formation, recognizing Occhiali's intentions. Occhiali then feigned a flanking maneuver on the Christian left wing, but Canale advanced to block his path, and when he tried to attack on the right, the same thing happened with Soranzo. Unable as well of separating their wings from the main body to create a breach, Occhiali fired at last time from afar. By then, the entire day had passed, and as the sun set, the Turks retreated rowing backwards, passing Cerigo towards the Laconian Gulf. Having lost sight of them in the darkness, the Christians returned to Cerigo.

=== Interlude ===
Next morning, Colonna sent two vessels to Corfu to warn John of Austria that the Ottoman fleet was now between them and was large enough to attempt to ambush him. Don John was expected to bring fifty galleys and thirty ships, so he was not expected to overcome them alone. The Holy League armada anchored for two days unable to find Occhiali, as the previous night the Ottoman admiral had also sent away a galley with a lantern as a decoy to confuse his trail. They ultimately decided to return to Corfu and reunite with John of Austria in any case. On August 9, they moved to Cerigo to collect water, where their exploring parties discovered the Turkish fleet near Cape Matapan. The Venetians lobbied for staying in Cerigo to watch out Occhiali did not attempt to attack Candia, but Colonna, reminding them the Turks were now located between the Christian fleet and the route John of Austria would follow, ordered to advance and seek battle to prevent Occhiali from trapping Don John.

=== Second day ===
At dawn on August 10, the Christian fleet turned Cape Matapan and caught the Ottomans off guard, although the latter managed to form in time. Resuming his plans, Occhiali formed a wide line and ordered his wings to advance, hoping to envelope the Christian galleys should these dare to leave their sailing ships and galleasses behind to attack. Anticipating his strategy, Colonna ordered the armada to stay put, and instructed Soranzo and Canale to turn their prows towards the Ottoman wings to prevent any flanking attempt.

Growing impatient, Soranzo acted on his own and advanced with his right wing towards the enemy, with his two galleasses on front and several galleys behind, clashing with the Ottoman left wing and driving it back. However, it turned out to be a feigned retreat, after which Occhiali ordered the wing to stay firm and fight. In spite of it, Soranzo managed to perform a controlled retreat while bombarding the Turkish wing from the advantage of his galleass flagship, while Colonna ordered the rest of the galleasses and ships to move to help the Venetian with their firepower. The Christian left wing under Canale also sought to intervene before desisting due to the fleets' espective positions. Although Occhiali had forced them to scramble, his own left wing was roughly handled. However, the Holy League could not follow its advantage, as the wind turned against the ships and galleasses.

Occhiali withdrew again to stay out of range of the Christian heavy artillery. With their vanguard unable to press on, and after lengthy deliberations with their peers, Colonna and Foscarini finally accepted to play into Occhiali's hands and advance with their galleys only to give battle. However, Occhiali then ordered his fleet to retreat finally, capitalizing on westerly wind to sail downwind towards Cape Matapan. The Christian armada then turned back and returned to Cerigo.

== Aftermath ==
Navarino and Modona.

Colonna and his captains discussed the best way to rendezvous with John of Austria, especially after finding out Occhiali was hoping to ambush him, but a frigate sent by Don John informed he was still in Corfu and ordered them to meet in Zante. The Spanish captains proposed to send the ships and galleasses to Candia for the rest of the fleet to reach Zante faster, while the Venetians preferred to keep the armada united and move to Candia to leave the vessels there, but it was unneeded at the end; Occhiali did not attempt to cut their way to Zante, and a favorable wind allowed the sailing ships to sail on their own quickly with the rest of the armada. On August 18 they reached Zante, although Don John had opted to remain in Corfu, so they eventually reached Corfu on 31. John of Austria waited for them with 55 galleys, 30 sailing ships and two Tuscan galleasses.

John of Austria disapproved of the skirmish they had carried out, deeming it too risky. Colonna and Gil de Andrade immediately offered to resign their posts, but Don John refused. The old question of reinforcing the Venetian galleys with Spanish marine infantry was then raised, which Foscarini initially refused, but eventually agreed if Papal soldiers were used instead. Decisions regarding future operations were further complicated by the arrival of autumn and its unfavorable weather, which foreshadowed an unproductive outcome for the League's 1572 campaign.

Sailing off September 8, after finding out that Occhiali had landed at Modon and Navarino, the League headed towards Sapientza in order to interpose themselves between the two, but the attempt was discovered and both Turkish squadrons passed to Modon. Occhiali came out of Modon and former in order of battle against them, only to hastily retreat to port when the Christian vanguard started unloading their artillery on the Ottoman fleet. Seeing they could not dislodge the Turkish fleet from land, John of Austria ordered to settle in Coron. On their way the beat back an attempt to Occhiali to bite on their rear guard, and in Coron the Spanish arquebusiers defeated a Janissary ambush. The Holy League finally decided to undertake the siege of Navarino in order to cut off Modon, but it was abandoned due to the practical disbandment of the League.

== See also ==
- Battle of Diu – Naval battle won by Portugal through superior ships and artillery over Muslim ships
- Battle of Cape Gelidonya – Naval battle where Spanish sailing ships defeated a much greater Ottoman fleet
- Raid on La Goulette (1609) – First operation in the Mediterranean were only sailing ships were fielded
- Battle of Focchies – Naval battle where Venetian sailing ships defeated a larger mixed Ottoman fleet

== Bibliography ==
- Rosell, Cayetano (1853). Historia del combate naval de Lepanto. Real Academia de la Historia.
- Anderson, Roger Charles (1952). Naval wars in the Levant, 1559-1853. Princeton University Press.
- Fernández Duro, Cesáreo (1896). Armada Española, desde la unión de los reinos de Castilla y Aragón, tomo II. Madrid: Instituto de Historia Naval.
- Setton, Kenneth (1984). The Papacy and the Levant, 1204-1571. American Philosophical Society.
