= Puff =

Puff or puffs may refer to:

== Science and technology ==
- Puff, a small quantity of gas or smoke in the air
  - Puff, a light gust of wind
  - Exhalation
  - Inhalation
- Puff model, volcanic ash tracking model developed at the University of Alaska Fairbanks
- PUFFS (NetBSD), a NetBSD kernel subsystem developed for running filesystems in userspace
- Chromosome puff or "Puffs", diffused uncoiled regions of the polytene chromosome that are sites of RNA transcription
- Picofarad (pF), a unit of capacitance sometimes pronounced "puff"

== Foods ==
- Cocoa Puffs, a brand of chocolate-flavored puffed grain breakfast cereal, manufactured by General Mills
- Cream puff or profiterole
- Curry puff
- Puff pastry
- Puffed grain
  - Cheese puffs, extruded corn snacks (and other flavors)
  - Sugar Puffs, a brand of sugar-frosted puffed grain breakfast cereal

== Military ==
- Passive Underwater Fire Control Feasibility System, a US Navy submarine sonar system
- Douglas AC-47 Spooky (nickname "Puff, the Magic Dragon"), a US Air Force ground-attack aircraft

== People with the name ==
- Puff Daddy or Sean Combs (born 1969), rapper
- Puff Johnson (1972–2013), American singer
- Puff Kuo (born 1988), Taiwanese singer and actress

== Fictional characters ==
- Puff, a character in Peter, Paul and Mary's 1963 song "Puff, the Magic Dragon"
- Mr. Puff, a character in Sheridan's 1779 play The Critic
- Mrs. Puff, a character in the television series SpongeBob SquarePants
- Puff, a pet poodle dog in Disney animated series The Proud Family
- Puff, a pet cat in the Dick and Jane textbook series

== Other uses ==
- Puff piece or puffery, exaggerated advertising claims
- Puff sleeve
- Powder puff, face-powder applicator
- Puffs (facial tissue), an American brand of facial tissue from Procter & Gamble
- Puffs, or Seven Increasingly Eventful Years at a Certain School of Magic and Magic, a 2015 play which is a pastiche of the Harry Potter book series
- "Puff", a 1962 song by Kenny Lynch

== See also ==
- Pouf or pouffe
- Poof (disambiguation)
- Puff adder (disambiguation)
- Puffer (disambiguation)
- Puffy (disambiguation)
- Puff the Magic Dragon (disambiguation)
- The Powerpuff Girls, an American superhero animated television series
