= Puffer (surname) =

Puffer is a surname. Notable people with the surname include:

- Alfred Puffer (1840–1875)
- Brandon Puffer (born 1975), American baseball player
- Ethel Dench Puffer Howes (1872–1950), American psychologist and feminist
- Fred Puffer (c. 1871 – 1900), American track and field athlete
- Ruth Rice Puffer (1907–2002), American biostatistician
- Ted Puffer (1928–2003), American singer, voice teacher and translator
- William Puffer (1861–1948), Canadian politician
