= Pietro Giustiniani =

Pietro Giustiniani (c. 1510-1572) was a Venetian admiral of the Knights Hospitaller. He was renowned by his role commanding the Hospitaller fleet in the Battle of Lepanto.

== Biography ==
As Prior of Messina, Giustiniani became the lieutenant of Grand Master Pietro del Monte in 1569. The following year, he assumed command of the fleet, replacing François de Saint-Clement, who had been sentenced to death by the Order for losing two galleys in the Battle of Gozo against Ottoman admiral Occhiali. In 1571, Del Monte sent him as a representative to pope Pius V's Holy League, subsequently participating in the Battle of Lepanto in command of three of the Order's galleys: the Capitana, the San Pietro and the San Giovanni. Giustiniani requested commander John of Austria to place his galley to the right of the papal flagship, Marcantonio Colonna's Capitana, but the ship of the Savoyard admiral, André Provana de Leyni, was stationed there instead.

During the battle, Giustiniani and his ships, positioned in the central body of the Christian fleet, came under a massive attack by Occhiali, who had managed to break through the Christian line after outmaneuvering and overwhelming the right flank led by the Genoese commander Giovanni Andrea Doria. Seven Turkish galleys surrounded the Capitana, which was boarded from all sides. Giustiniani and thirty other Knights of Malta cut down nearly 300 Ottoman soldiers, but were ultimately defeated and the ship was captured, with only the Prior and two knights surviving. Giustiniani sustained seven wounds, including five arrow strikes and a nearly severed arm, and survived only because a Muslim slave in his retinue locked him in the bilge. From there, the Prior was able to negotiate with the Turks to save his life in exchange for a large sum of money. Occhiali seized the Capitana's standard and had begun towing the vessel away as a prize, but was forced to cast it loose and flee upon the arrival of Álvaro de Bazán's reserve fleet and the restoration of Doria's flank. The galley was recaptured with all the Turks still on board, and Giustiniani thus regained both his freedom and his money.

After the battle, Giustiniani rewarded his slave with gold and freedom, but the man chose to remain with him. The following year, Giustiniani took part in the skirmish at Cerigo Channel, where Occhiali was defeated once again, although the Prior died of illness shortly thereafter.

== Bibliography ==
- Jack Beeching, La battaglia di Lepanto, Bompiani, 1982, ISBN 9788858758700
- Alberto Guglielmotti, Marcantonio Colonna alla battaglia di Lepanto, Le Monnier, 1862
- Niccolò Capponi, Lepanto 1571 - La Lega santa contro l'impero ottomano, Il saggiatore, 2006, ISBN 9788856502022
- Crowley, Roger (2008). Empires of the Sea: The siege of Malta, the battle of Lepanto and the contest for the center of the world. Random House. ISBN 978-1-4000-6624-7.
