= Magic Dragon =

Magic Dragon can refer to:

== People ==
- Kazuharu Sonoda (1956-1987), a Japanese professional wrestler using the ring name "Magic Dragon"
- Piff the Magic Dragon (born 1980), a magician and comedian from the United Kingdom

== Songs ==
- "Magic Dragon", a song on the album Agent Orange by the thrash metal band Sodom
- "Puff, the Magic Dragon", a 1963 song by Peter, Paul and Mary

== Transportation and vehicular ==
- A microlift glider that is an advancement from the basic Carbon Dragon design
- A nickname for the Douglas AC-47 Spooky gunship
- SpaceX Magic Dragon, the initial conceptual model design prototype for the SpaceX Dragon space capsule program

== See also ==
- Stuff the Magic Dragon, the team mascot for the Orlando Magic
- Magic (disambiguation)
- Dragon (disambiguation)
- Puff the Magic Dragon (disambiguation)
