= Puff the Magic Dragon (disambiguation) =

Puff the Magic Dragon or variation, may refer to:

== Arts, entertainment, and media ==
- "Puff, the Magic Dragon" is a 1958 poem by Lenny Lipton
- "Puff, the Magic Dragon" (song) is a 1963 song by Peter, Paul and Mary based on the poem
- A series of U.S. animated TV specials from Fred Wolf Films:
  - Puff the Magic Dragon, a 1978 U.S. animated TV program based on the eponymous song
  - Puff the Magic Dragon in the Land of the Living Lies (TV special), a 1979 animated sequel U.S. TV program to the 1978 special
  - Puff and the Incredible Mr. Nobody (TV special), a 1982 U.S. animated TV program sequel to the 1978 and 1979 specials

== Other ==
- Douglas AC-47, a USAF flying gunship nicknamed "Puff the Magic Dragon" after the song
- Reg Gasnier (1939–2014), an Australian rugby league player who was nicknamed "Puff the Magic Dragon"

== See also ==
- Piff the Magic Dragon (born 1980), a British comedian and magician
- Stuff the Magic Dragon, the team mascot for the Orlando Magic
- Puff (disambiguation)
- Magic Dragon (disambiguation)
