= Puffy =

Puffy can refer to:

== People ==
- Charles Puffy (1884–1942/1943), Hungarian film actor
- Sean Combs (born 1969), American rapper and entrepreneur
- Mike Bordin (born 1962), American drummer for the rock band Faith No More
- Jeff Dubay (born 1968), Minnesota sports talk radio personality

== Other uses ==
- Puffy AmiYumi, a Japanese pop duo
  - Puffy: P.S. I Love You, 1999 PlayStation game featuring Puffy AmiYumi
- Puffy (mascot), the mascot of the free operating system OpenBSD
- Puffy planet, a class of gas giant planets that have a very low density
- Puffy Lake, a lake in Manitoba, Canada – see Sherridon, Manitoba

== See also ==
- Puff (disambiguation)
