= Poof (disambiguation) =

Poof is an informal and offensive term for a homosexual man, used in UK.

Poof may also refer to:

- Baby Poof, a character in the American animated series The Fairly OddParents
- Yarael Poof, a character in the Star Wars franchise

== See also ==
- Pouf, a hairstyle
- Pouf or Pouffe, another name for Ottoman (furniture)
- Poofer, a fictional elf in Wee Sing: The Best Christmas Ever
