= Alfred Puffer =

Alfred F. Puffer (1840 – July 1, 1875) was Deputy Collector of Customs at the United States Customs House in New York City. He was appointed to this office by Chester A. Arthur on October 1, 1873, being promoted from Entry Clerk. During the American Civil War, Puffer "had been a correspondent at New Orleans for the New York Herald and was the anonymous author of the [Benjamin F.] Butler-praising article 'Our General,' which had appeared in the July 1863 issue of the Atlantic". Subsequently, he served on Butler's staff in Virginia. He was a native of Massachusetts.

Puffer died suddenly of apoplexy at his 24th Street, Manhattan, New York residence, in 1875. He left his office at the Customs House on the afternoon of June 30 and returned to his home. He felt a warm sensation and resolved to take a bath. His wife summoned friends for assistance when he failed to respond to a knock on the bathroom door. They found him unconscious on the floor and a physician was quickly summoned. Puffer died the following morning at 9 a.m. He was survived by his wife and two children. His son Fred Puffer became a champion hurdler in the 1890s.
