= Giacomo Foscarini =

Italian politician (1523–1603)

Portrait by Tintoretto, 1580

Giacomo Foscarini (5 April 1523 – 25 January 1603), also spelled Jacopo Foscarini, was a merchant, statesman and admiral of the Republic of Venice.

He made his fortune as a trader in Paris and London before entering politics in 1559. During the Ottoman–Venetian War (1570–1573), he served as governor of Dalmatia and Albania and then Captain General of the Sea. From 1574 to 1578, he was the governor of Crete with extraordinary powers. He reached the peak of his influence in Venice after his election as a Procurator of Saint Mark in 1580. He served a second term as Captain General in 1594.

== Family ==
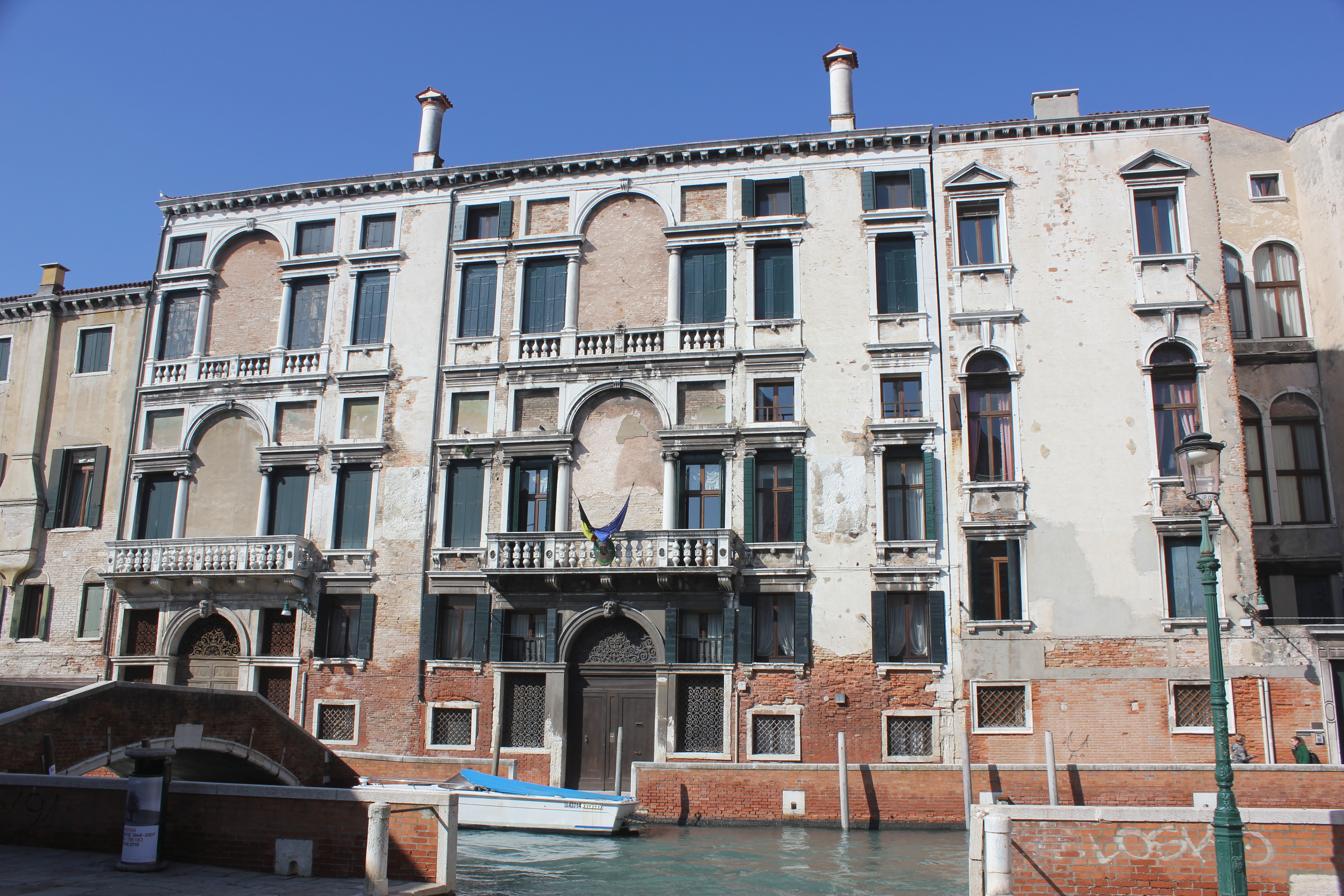
Palazzo Foscarini across from the Carmini, built by Giacomo

Foscarini was born on 5 April 1523 in Santa Sofia, Venice. His father, Alvise di Andrea Foscarini, belonged to the Santa Fosca branch of the patrician Foscarini family. His mother, Marietta, belonged to the Donà family. He was the firstborn of fifteen children.

On 26 November 1556, Foscarini married Elena Giustinian, whose dowry was 5,000 ducats and whose family had close connections with the church. They had three sons and four daughters:

- Alvise
- Giambattista (1564–1628), who married Elena Da Mula
- Francesco, who became a monk
- Marietta, who married Alvise Barbaro, son of Marcantonio Barbaro, in 1574
- Laura, who married Stefano Trevisan in 1578
- Paolina, who married Pietro Priuli
- Foscarina, who married Francesco Mocenigo and then, in 1578, Antonio Correr

Foscarini's primary residence was the Palazzo Foscarini across from the church of the Carmini. He built it himself, substantially completing it by 1574.

== Career ==
=== Merchant in Paris and London ===
In 1539, Foscarini accompanied Antonio Cappello and Vincenzo Grimani on an embassy to France. He spent the next sixteen years abroad, mainly on business in Paris and London. During this time he befriended the Venetian diplomat Daniele Barbaro. He also saw firsthand the effects of the English Reformation. He entered into a joint enterprise with fellow merchant Giacomo Ragazzoni. Their ships travelled between the North Sea and the Mediterranean. In 1544 and 1557, they suffered serious losses, but mostly they made enormous profits. Foscarini continued to be involved in trade after returning to Venice in the mid-1550s. He left his brother Girolamo in charge of his affairs in London. He also opened a bank, although this closed in 1568.

=== Early political career ===
Foscarini was elected savio alle Acque in 1559 and provveditore alla Sanità in 1561. In August 1564, he joined the 60-member zonta of the Senate. He was a regular member of the Senate in 1565–1566. In 1566–1568, he served two terms as savio alla Mercanzia. He served a stint as podestà of Rovigo and was elected podestà of Verona in February 1569 and rewarded for his good administration by election as savio di Terraferma in September 1570.

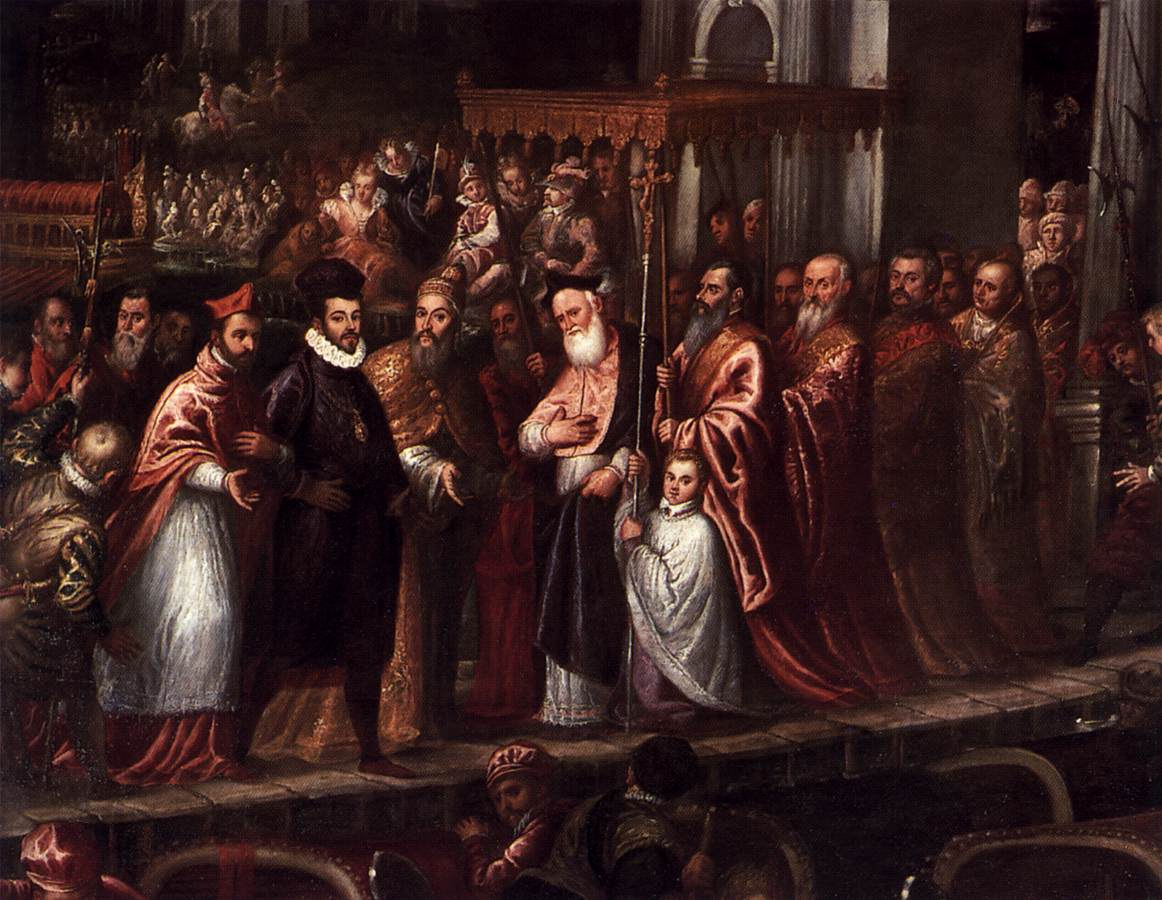
Detail from Andrea Vicentino's painting depicting Henry III's arrival in Venice. Foscarini is behind the papal nuncio.

A war with the Ottomans over Cyprus broke out in 1570. As it damaged Venice's seaborne trade, Foscarini turned to property speculation in the Domini di Terraferma, jointly with his son Giambattista and daughter Foscarina. On 20 November 1570, he was appointed provveditore generale in Dalmatia and Albania. He landed in Zadar in the spring of 1571. He took part in the Battle of Lepanto on 7 October 1571. On 3 February 1572, he was appointed Captain General of the Sea. On 3 April, he sailed for Corfu and participated in the skirmish at Cerigo Channel under Marcantonio Colonna. His caution and conservatism contrast with the audacity of his predecessor, Sebastiano Venier. He returned to Venice in May 1573, after the signing of a peace treaty.

On 15 May 1574, Foscarini was named provveditore generale, sindaco, captain general and inquisitor general of Crete with extraordinary powers. Before embarking, he escorted King Henry III of France on his visit to Venice in July and hosted the king in his own house. He received a knighthood from the king.

=== Cretan years ===
Foscarini arrived in Crete in September or October 1574. With extraordinary temporal and spiritual powers, he was, as his funerary inscription indicates, the "dictator" of Crete. His administration of 27 months was one of radical reform. He maintained the feudal system, but improved the lot of the peasantry by putting more land under wheat cultivation at the expense of vineyards. He rearranged the island's defences and improved its fortifications, commissioning the fortress at Spinalonga. He also sought to manage religious differences between Catholics and Orthodox.

In 1577, Foscarini commissioned the local scholar Francesco Barozzi to take a census of the island. He also commissioned him to translate the Oracles of Leo the Wise from Greek into Latin. He commission the local scribe and artist Georgios Klontzas to produce two lush illuminated manuscripts of the text, the Bute Manuscript (today in a private collection) and Oxford, Bodleian Library, MS Barocci 170. The former, the apparently unfinished presentation copy, was made in Heraklion between April 1577 and March 1578. The unfinished presentation miniature is missing Foscarini's portrait, but does include an angel holding the ducal hat positioned above the blank space, a strong indication that Foscarini had ducal aspirations. He had been a candidate for doge in 1578 and would be again in 1585 and 1595. The whole project of translating and illustrating the Oracles was a work of propaganda that altered the meaning of the text to prophesy Christian victory against the Ottomans.

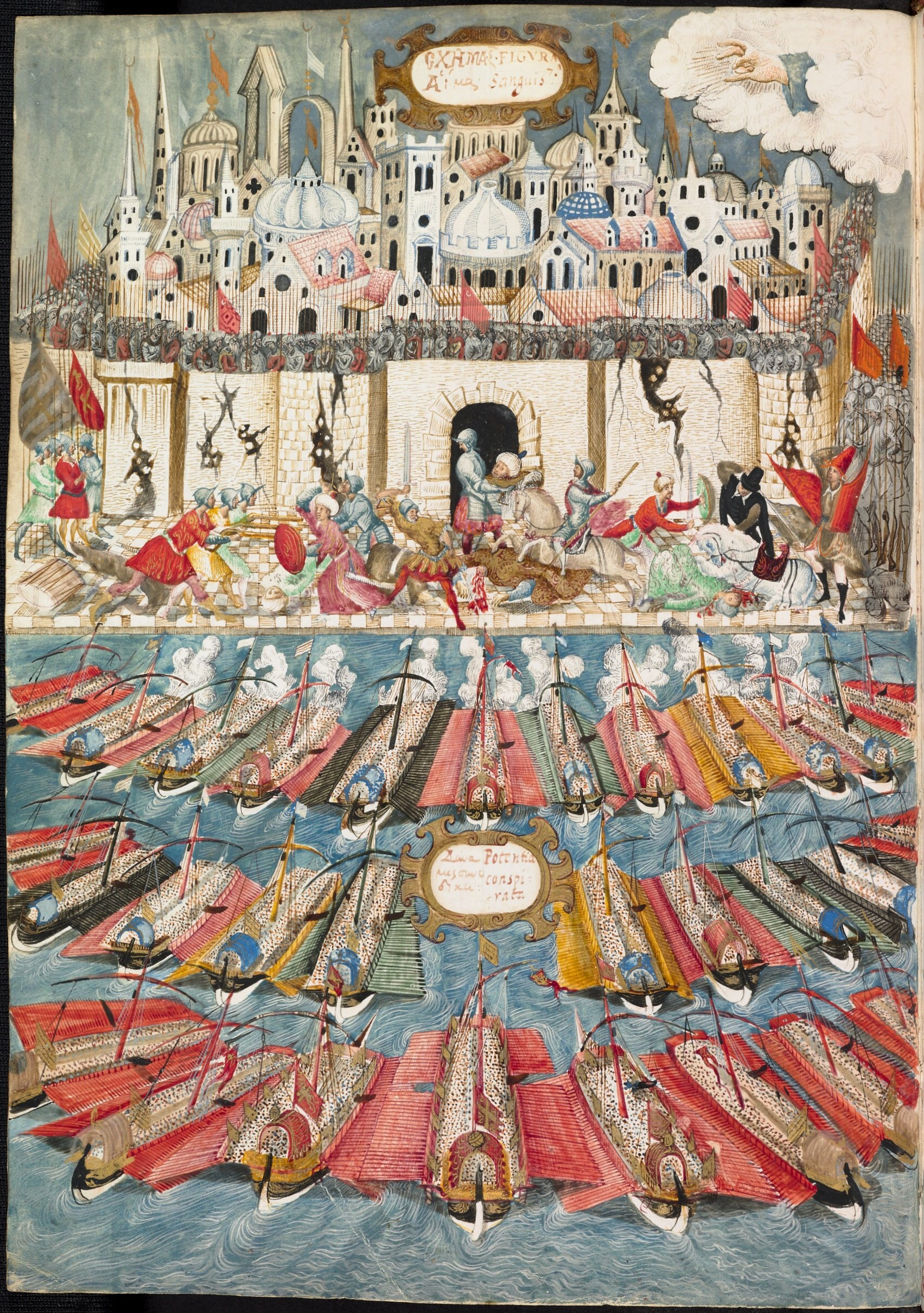
The introduction (left) and a representative illustration (right) from the Bodleian copy of the Oracles

Foscarini's Cretan policies earned him many enemies among the local elite and he returned to Venice early in 1578. Assessments of his rule in Crete have been divergent. To Johann Wilhelm Zinkeisen he was man of "deep insight, a strong sense of justice and a spirit of clemency and reconciliation" who led the "last futile attempt to relieve the basic evils of Venetian rule ... and save the power of the Republic." To Joshua Starr he was "an intolerant fanatic" whose rule "was a dark period for Jews and Greeks alike."

=== Peak influence ===
In the 1580s and 1590s, Foscarini was one of the most prestigious Venetian statesmen, alongside the future doges Leonardo Donà and Marino Grimani. On 8 March 1580, Foscarini was elected Procurator of Saint Mark. In 1580–1581, he sat on the zonta of the procurators. He was one of the three members of the committee that oversaw the renovation of the Doge's Palace after the fire of 1577. In 1584, he was elected to the commission overseeing the construction of the Rialto Bridge in stone. In 1596, he supported the construction of the Procuratie Nuove designed by Vincenzo Scamozzi, probably on account of its triumphalism. The master builder Baldissera Drachio dedicated his Visione to Foscarini.

Foscarini was elected provveditore all'Arsenale four times between 1582 and 1590. He was provveditore all'Artigliere, commissioner of artillery, in 1588–1589. He led embassies to congratulate the newly elected popes Sixtus V (1585), Urban VII (1590), Gregory XIV (1590) and Innocent IX (1591). He was one of the riformatori (reformers) of the University of Padua in 1588 and 1600, in which capacity he fought for the restoration of the Jesuit schools. He served the Zecca (mint) as depositario (1592), provveditore (1596) and conservatore (1601). In 1594, he was again Captain General of the Sea. In 1595, he was sopraprovveditore alla Sanità. He played a major role in the construction of the fortress of Palmanova.

He is usually seen as a conservative in the context of Venetian politics at the time, favouring alliance with the Papacy and Spain. Nevertheless, he supported the reform of the savi all'Eresia in 1595 to give the laity a greater role and asked Pope Clement VIII to postpone the enforcement of the Index of Prohibited Books in Venice. Likewise, in 1600 he supported the election of Matteo Zane as patriarch of Venice over Clement's objections. In 1598, he led an embassy to congratulate Clement on the acquisition of the Duchy of Ferrara. In 1601, he was a savio all'Eresia.

=== Final years and death ===
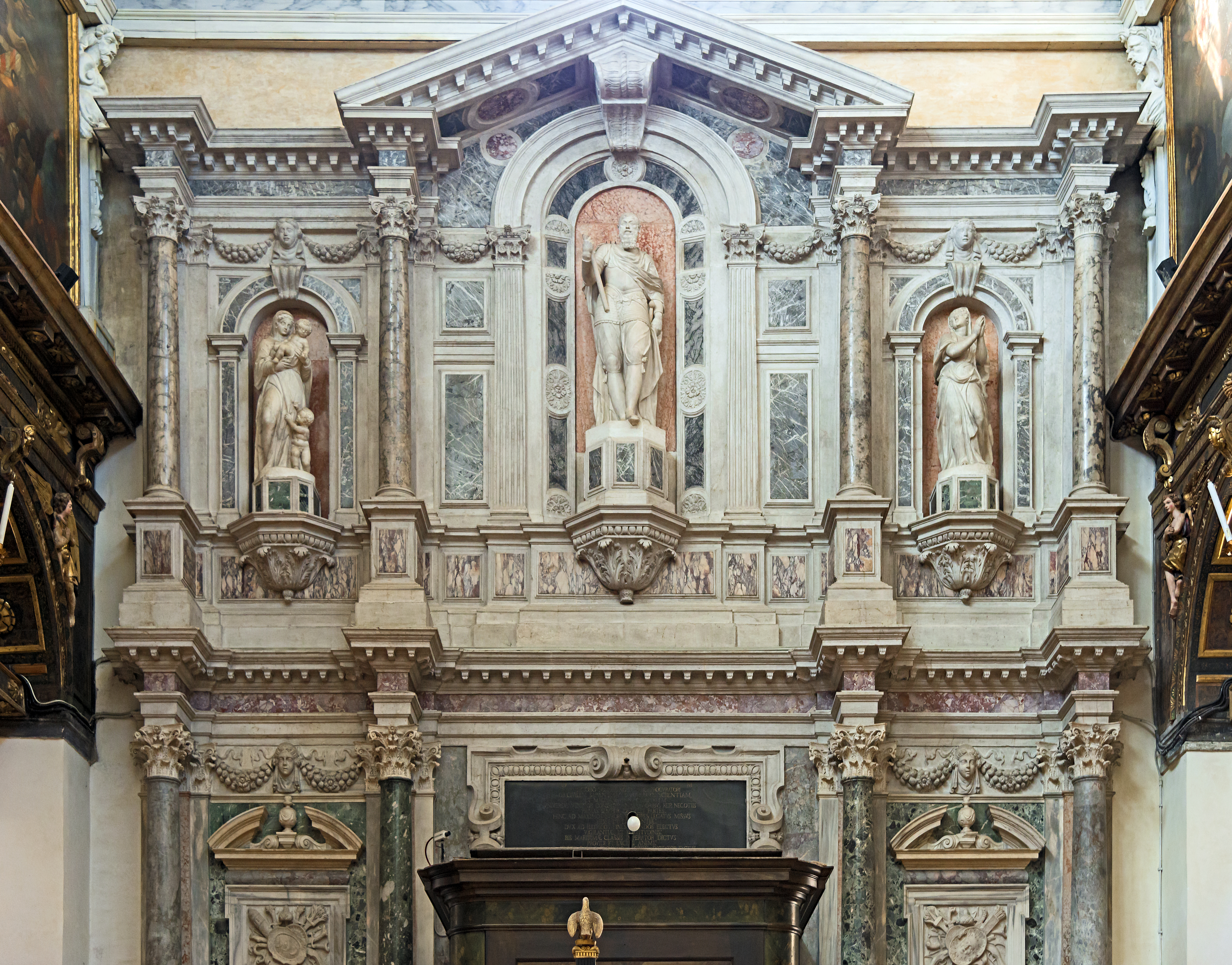
Foscarini's funerary monument in the Carmini depicts him as a Captain General of the Sea

In January 1602, Foscarini was still fighting to reopen the Jesuit schools in Padua. Although he was a recognized expert in economic matters, a letter he wrote concerning the Banco della Piazza di Rialto on 28 August 1602 sparked a controversy that marred his last months. He died in Venice on 25 January 1603 after eleven days of fever. He was buried in the Carmini. His funerary monument depicts him as a Captain General of the Sea. In his will, he divided his property between his two eldest sons, favouring the second. He also made bequests to the Jesuits. He left a table to his old friend Giacomo Ragazzoni.

Giovanni Antonio Ridolfi Sforza wrote a biography of Foscarini in Latin, Iacobi Foscareni equitis et D. Marci procuratoris vita, printed at Venice in 1623. An Italian translation, Vita di Giacopo Foscarini, Cavaliere e Procuratore di S. Marco, appeared the following year.

== Bibliography ==
- Ankori, Zvi [in Hebrew] (1981). "Giacomo Foscarini and the Jews of Crete: A Reconsideration". Michael: On the History of the Jews in the Diaspora: 9–118. JSTOR 23495983.
- Bancroft-Marcus, Rosemary E. [in German] (1983). "Women in the Cretan Renaissance (1570–1669)". Journal of Modern Greek Studies. 1 (1): 19–38. doi:10.1353/mgs.2010.0048.
- Cecchini, Isabella; Pezzolo, Luciano (2012). "Merchants and Institutions in Early-modern Venice" (PDF). The Journal of European Economic History. 41 (2): 89–114.
- De Maria, Blake (2013). "Jacopo Foscarini, Francesco Barozzi, and the Oracles of Leo the Wise". In Nebahat Avcioğlu; Emma Jones (eds.). Architecture, Art and Identity in Venice and its Territories, 1450–1750: Essays in Honour of Deborah Howard. Ashgate. pp. 219–229.
- Donnelly, John Patrick (1982). "The Jesuit College at Padua: Growth, Suppression, Attempts at Restoration, 1552–1606". Archivum Historicum Societatis Iesu. 51: 45–79.
- Howard, Deborah (2008). "Architectural Politics in Renaissance Venice" (PDF). Proceedings of the British Academy. 154: 29–67.
- Starr, Joshua (1942). "Jewish Life in Crete Under the Rule of Venice". Proceedings of the American Academy for Jewish Research. 12: 59–114. JSTOR 3622097.
- Tafuri, Manfredo (1995) [1985]. Venice and the Renaissance. Translated by Jessica Levine. MIT Press.
- Zago, Roberto (1997). "Foscarini, Giacomo (Jacopo)". Dizionario Biografico degli Italiani (in Italian). Vol. 49: Forino–Francesco da Serino. Rome: Istituto dell'Enciclopedia Italiana. ISBN 978-88-12-00032-6.
