= Fred Puffer =

American track and field athlete

Frederick Collamore "Fred" Puffer (c. 1871 – July 22, 1900) was an American track and field athlete. He was United States champion in the 120 yd hurdles in 1892 and 1893 and in the 220 yd hurdles from 1892 to 1894.

== Biography ==
Fred Puffer was the son of Customs deputy collector Alfred Puffer, who died while his son was still young. The younger Puffer's athletic career began in 1887 with YMCA and the Olympic Athletic Club. His first major successes came at the 1892 national (AAU) championships, where he ran for the Manhattan Athletic Club; he won both the 120 yd high hurdles and the 220 yd low hurdles and helped his club win the team title. Puffer's time in the high hurdles, 15.4, was better than the world record but had been wind-aided; additionally, he had knocked down hurdles, which at the time also invalidated performances for record purposes.

The 1893 AAU championships were held in conjunction with the World's Fair in Chicago, and the New York Times promoted the occasion with a special medal to be awarded to the best athlete of the meeting; the medal's value exceeded the allowable limit in amateur competition, and had to receive a special exemption from the Amateur Athletic Union. Puffer set his sights on this medal, declaring himself the favorite to win it; James E. Sullivan, secretary of the AAU, also considered Puffer the favorite. At the championships, Puffer repeated his hurdles double from the previous year, but sprinter Charles Stage also won two events; the judges were unable to decide which of them deserved the medal, and after both Puffer and Stage refused to draw lots for it, the matter was referred to the AAU to be decided later. In the end, the medal was cut in half, with both athletes receiving one part.

In addition to hurdling, Puffer was a good long jumper, winning Metropolitan and Canadian championship titles in that event in 1893; his mark at the Metropolitan meet, 22 ft 5 1/4 in (6.83 m), ranked him in the world's top 10 that year. At the 1894 AAU championships Puffer won his third consecutive title in the low hurdles, but was beaten in the 120 yd hurdles by newcomer Stephen Chase, who set a new world record of 15.6. In the following years Puffer became an athletic instructor and competed only at the games of the 22nd Regiment, which he belonged to; in 1897, he and Eugene Goff were declared professionals and ineligible for amateur competition on the grounds that as instructors they received money from sports. Puffer served with the Army in Cuba during the Spanish–American War of 1898 until he was sent home due to his failing health; he never fully recovered, remaining in poor health for his final years. He died of pneumonia at his mother's home in New York City on July 22, 1900.
