= Wheellock =

Firearm action

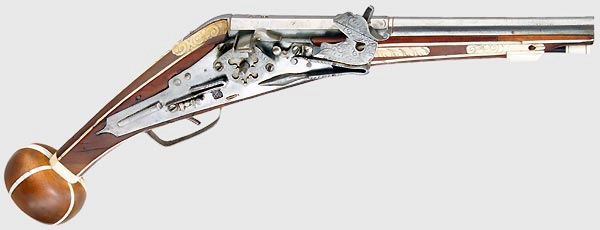
A wheellock pistol or puffer, Augsburg, c. 1580

A wheellock, wheel-lock, or wheel lock is a friction-wheel mechanism which creates a spark that causes a firearm to fire. It was the next major development in firearms technology after the matchlock, and the first self-igniting firearm. Its name is from its rotating steel wheel to provide ignition. Developed in Europe around 1500, it was used alongside the matchlock (c. 1410s), the snaplock (c. 1540s), the snaphance (c. 1560s), and the flintlock (c. 1610s).

== Design ==
The wheellock works by spinning a spring-loaded steel wheel against a piece of pyrite to generate intense sparks, which ignite gunpowder in a pan, which flashes through a small touchhole to ignite the main charge in the firearm's barrel. The pyrite is clamped in vise jaws on a spring-loaded arm (or 'dog'), which rests on the pan cover. When the trigger is pulled, the pan cover is opened, and the wheel is rotated, with the pyrite pressed into contact.

A close modern analogy of the wheellock mechanism is the operation of a lighter, where a toothed steel wheel is spun in contact with a piece of sparking material to ignite the liquid or gaseous fuel.

A wheellock firearm had the advantage that it could be instantly readied and fired even with one hand, in contrast to common matchlock firearms, which required a burning cord of slow match ready if the gun might be needed and demanded the operator's full attention and two hands to operate. On the other hand, wheellock mechanisms were complex to make, making them relatively costly.

Mechanism
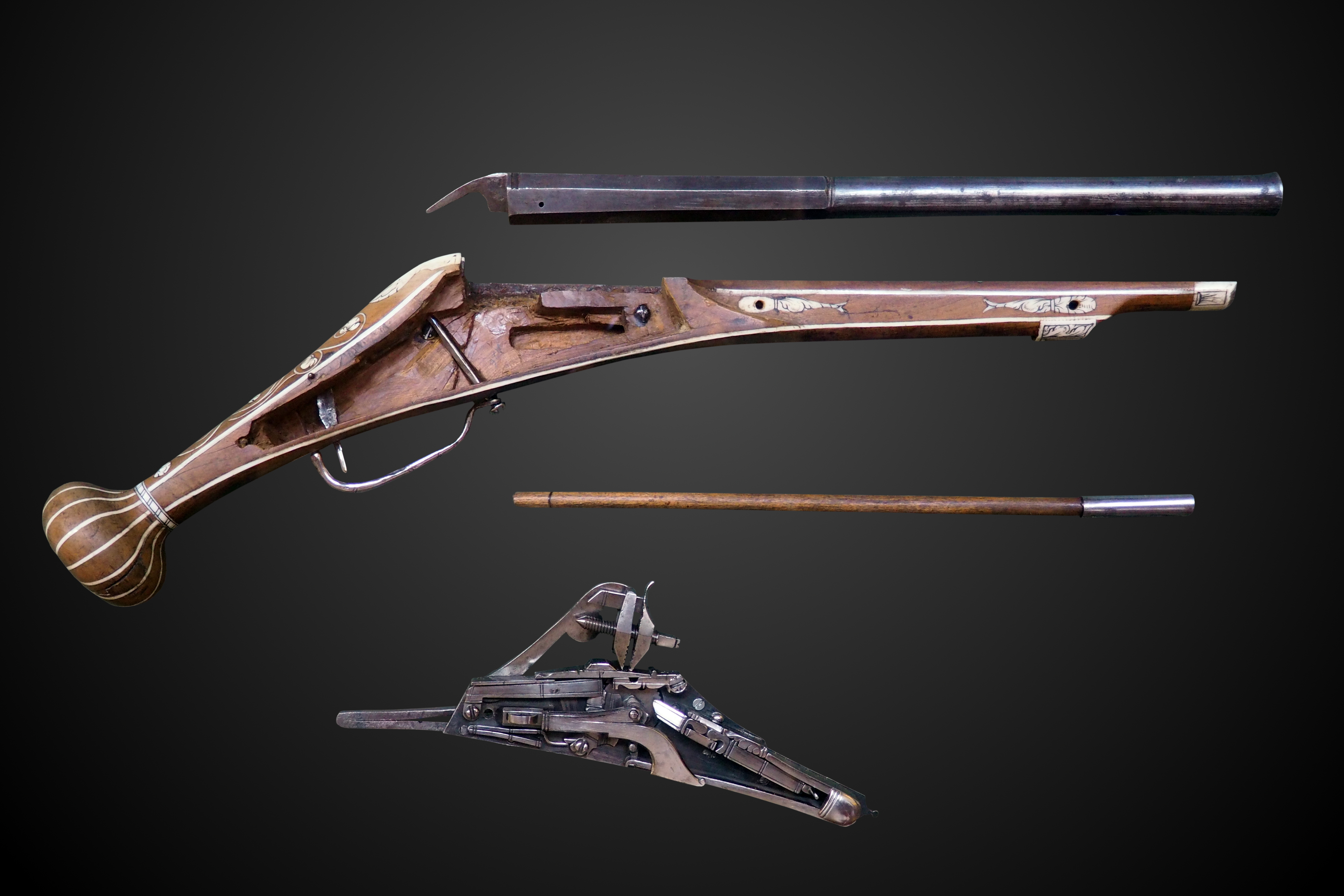
Disassembled wheellock pistol of the 16th century

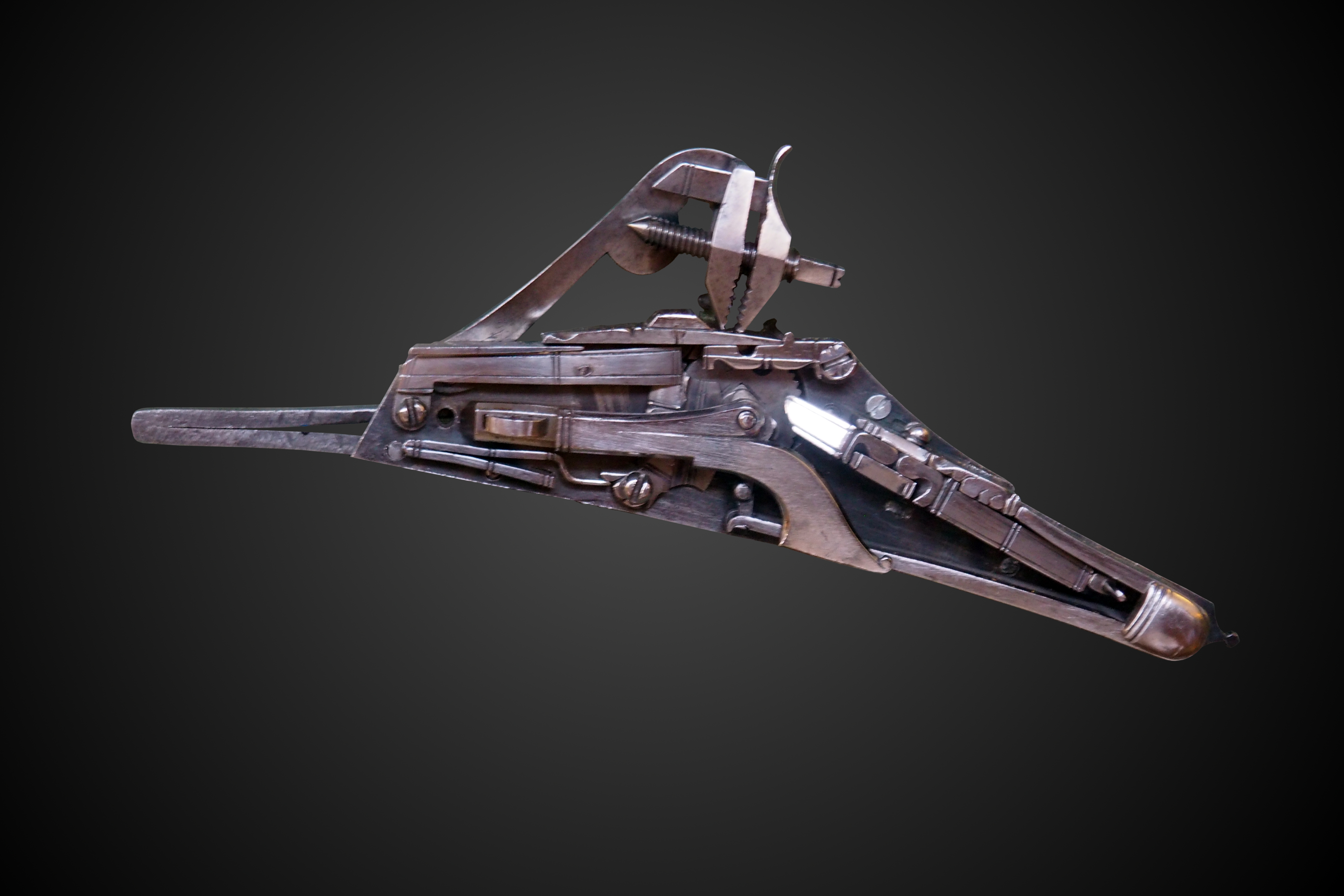
Detail of the mechanism, with the wheel visible under the dog

=== The "dog" ===
The dog is a spring-loaded arm pivoted on the outside of the lock plate. A sparking material, usually a small piece of iron pyrite, is clamped and held by vise-like jaws at the swinging end of the arm. The dog has two possible positions to which it can be pivoted by hand: a "safe" position, in which the dog is pushed towards the muzzle of the firearm, and an "operating" position, where the dog is pulled towards the operator so that the pyrite in its jaws can engage either the top of the pan cover, or (in the absence of the pan cover) the edge of a steel wheel bearing longitudinal grooves around its circumference. Flint is not suitable as a sparking material in the wheellock because it is too hard and would quickly wear away the wheel grooves.

=== The wheel ===
The upper segment of the grooved wheel, made of hardened steel, projects through a slot cut to its precise dimensions in the base of the priming pan. The wheel is grooved on its outside circumference with three or more V-shaped grooves with transverse cuts at intervals to provide a friction surface for the iron pyrite. The wheel is fixed to a shaft, one end of which projects outside the lockplate. The outside projection is of square section to permit a spanner (wrench) to be engaged for subsequent tensioning of the lock. The other end of the shaft fits through a hole in the lockplate, and on this end is forged a cam, or eccentric. One end of a short, robust chain (made of three or four flat, parallel links like a short piece of bicycle chain) is fixed to the cam, while the other end of the chain is held in a groove at the end of the longer branch of a large heavy V-spring, which is generally retained by a screw and a headed bracket through upstands inside the lockplate.

=== The pan ===
As in all muzzle-loading firearms (prior to the introduction of the percussion cap), the pan transmits the fire to the main charge of gunpowder inside the breech of the barrel, via a small hole (or "vent") in the side of the breech, that gives on to the pan. The priming pan of all wheellocks is provided with a sliding cover that has two purposes, the first of which is to contain the priming powder and afford it some protection from the elements (the second is examined below, under 'Operation'). The pan cover may be slid open and closed by hand, but it is also attached to an arm inside the lock plate, which is acted upon by the eccentric on the shaft of the wheel.

=== The sear or trigger mechanism ===
The trigger engages one arm of a "z"-shaped sear pivoting in its centre between two upstanding brackets riveted or brazed to the inside of the lockplate. The other arm of the sear passes through a hole in the lockplate, and engages in a blind hole on the inner side of the wheel, thus effectively locking it and preventing any rotation but only because of a secondary sear or wedge that is pressed under the rear arm of the sear—that is between the lockplate and the sear—when the forward part of it engages into the recess in the wheel. When the trigger is pulled, the secondary lever is withdrawn from its position and the strong pull of the mainspring pushes the unsupported main sear back into the lock and the wheel is free to rotate. The mechanism may seem overconstructed, but it prevents the trigger mechanism from working against the very powerful mainspring as it is the case with all vertical acting sears in flint and percussion locks or even modern firearms that still have cocks (revolvers).

=== Preparing to fire ===
First, the dog is rotated forward to the "safe" position, and the priming pan is pushed open (if it is not already so). After loading a powder charge and ball through the muzzle in the usual way, the operator takes his "spanner", slips it onto the square section of the wheel shaft, and turns it until a click is heard (about one-half to three-quarters of a revolution), and the wheel is felt to lock in place, whereupon the spanner is withdrawn. What occurs is that when the wheel is turned, the mainspring is tensioned via the chain, which is wound partially around the shaft. The click is the sound of one end of the sear engaging in the blind hole on the inside of the wheel, thus immobilising it.

The pan is then primed with powder, and the pan cover pulled shut. Finally the dog is pulled back so that the pyrite in its jaws is resting on the top of the pan cover, under some pressure from the spring at the toe of its arm.

=== Operation ===
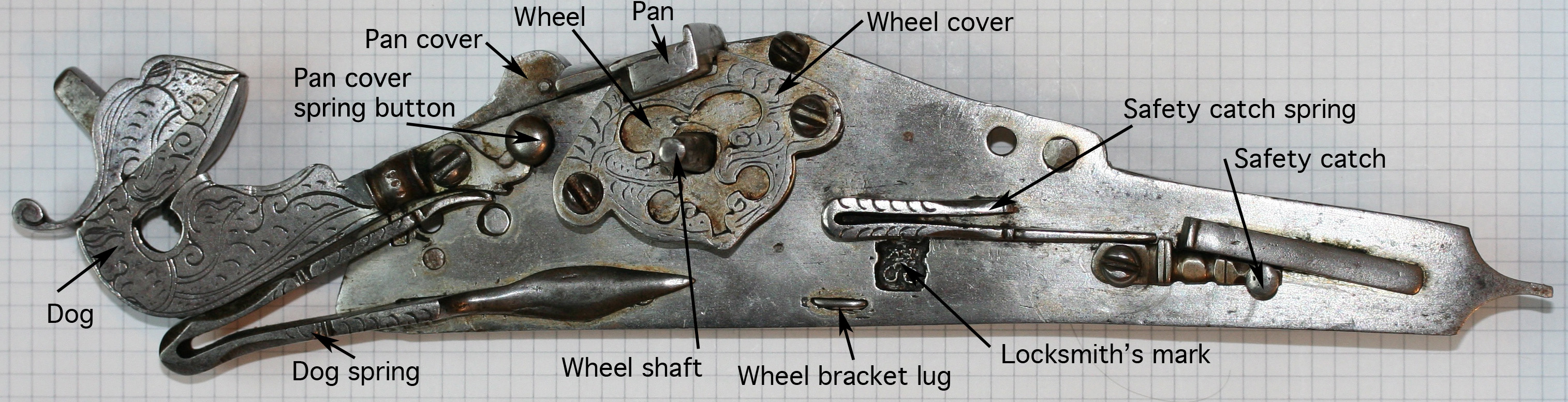
The exterior of a wheellock mechanism from a "puffer" or pistol made in Augsburg in about 1580. The photo has been reversed in order to facilitate comparison with the interior view below.

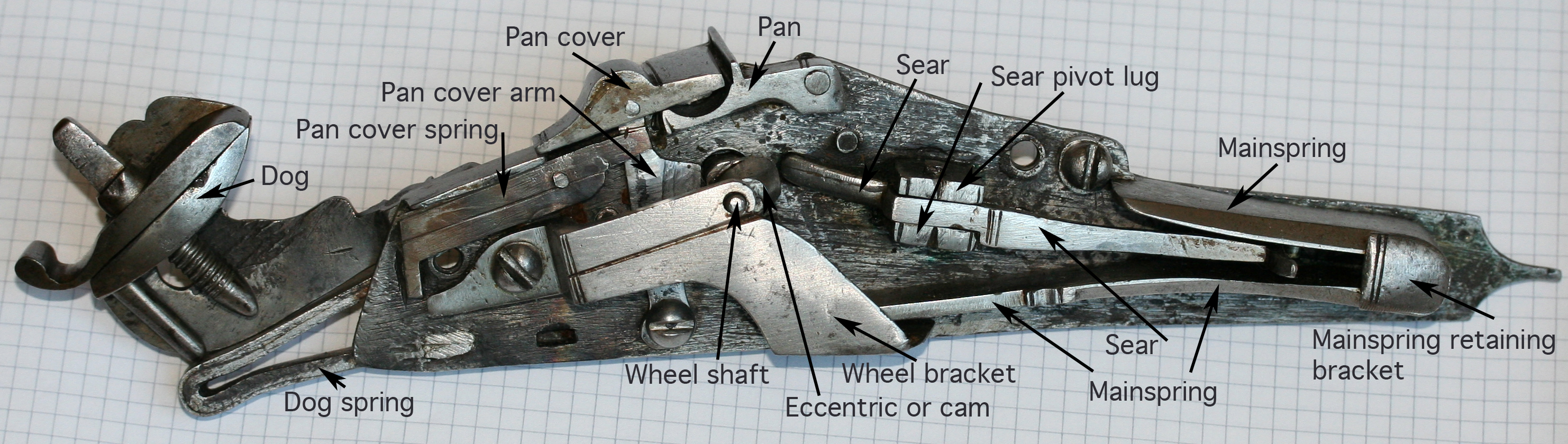
The interior of a wheellock mechanism from a "puffer" or pistol made in Augsburg in about 1580. The mechanism is shown at rest, with the long arm of the mainspring resting on the bottom of the wheel bracket. Invisible behind the wheel bracket is the chain linking the end of the mainspring with the eccentric on the wheel shaft. Also not visible are the sear spring (hidden behind the sear arm itself) and the secondary sear (the end can just be seen to the right of the end of the main sear arm). The "nose" of the main sear going through a hole in the lock plate where it engages with the wheel on the other side.

On pulling the trigger of a wheellock firearm, the sear effects a slight rotation as described above. The end of the sear arm (that has hitherto locked the wheel and prevented it from turning) is disengaged, leaving the wheel free to turn under the tension of the mainspring. There is a subtlety here that is of vital importance: the "hole" in the side of the wheel into which the sear engages, is not a parallel-sided shaft. If it were, then under the tremendous tension of the mainspring, it would require a huge force on the trigger to disengage the sear. Nor is the tip of the sear arm cylindrical, which would have a similar effect. Rather, the "hole" is a depression in the wheel (like a small crater), and the sear has a rounded end: the wheel is locked by reason of lateral force on the shaft of the wheel rather than vertical force on the sear.

As soon as the wheel is released by the sear, the longer arm of the mainspring pulls the chain engaged in it. The other end of the chain being fixed to the cam on the wheel shaft, the latter rotates at high speed, whilst the rotating cam pushes forward the arm to which the pan cover is attached, thus causing the pan cover to slide forward towards the muzzle of the piece, and the pyrites to fall (under tension of the dog spring) on to the now rotating wheel. That is the second purpose of a sliding pan cover: were the pyrites to engage a stationary wheel, it would almost certainly jam the mechanism: but the built-in delay allows the pyrites to slip off the sliding pan-cover on to an already rotating wheel. A more modern development has been the use of a ball bearing between the wheel and the sear. This design allows a smoother and lighter trigger pull, requiring less force to operate.

The fast rotation of the wheel against the pyrites produces white-hot sparks that ignite the powder in the pan, which is transferred to the main charge in the breech of the barrel via the vent, and the gun discharges.

The wheellock took around a minute to load, prepare and fire. Many contemporary illustrations of a wheellock pistol in action show the gun held slightly rotated (about 45 degree angle from the horizontal) rather than vertically as with a hand cannon, to ensure that the priming powder in the pan lay against the vent in the barrel, and avoid a 'flash in the pan' or misfire. This was not the case for the flintlock, where the sparks had to fall vertically a certain distance on to the pan.

== History ==
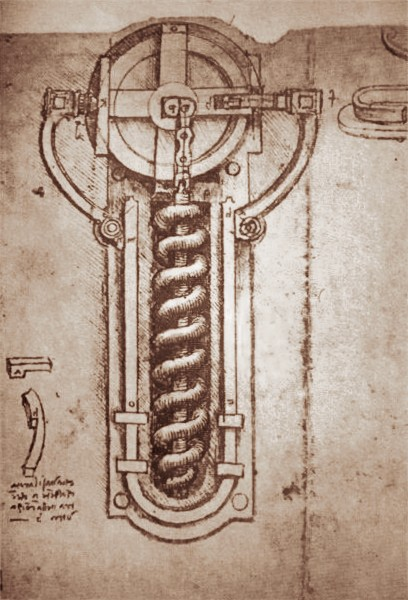
Wheellock of Leonardo da Vinci, 1500

Though not a firearm, a wheellock mechanism for a land mine is described in the Huolongjing, a 14th-century Chinese military manual. When stepped on, a pin is dislodged, causing a weight to fall, which spun a drum attached to two steel wheels. The wheels struck sparks against a flint, igniting the fuse.

The invention of the wheellock in Europe can be placed at about 1500. There is a vocal group of scholars who believe Leonardo da Vinci was the inventor. Drawings made by Leonardo of a wheellock mechanism date (depending on the authority) from either the mid-1490s or the first decade of the 16th century. However, a drawing from a book of German inventions (dated 1505) and a 1507 reference to the purchase of a wheellock in Austria may indicate the inventor was an unknown German mechanic instead. One possible contender is mechanic Martin Loffelholz.

In 1517 and 1518, the first gun control laws banning the wheellock were proclaimed by the Emperor Maximilian I, initially in Austria and later throughout the Holy Roman Empire. Several Italian states followed suit in the 1520s and 1530s, another argument used by the pro-German camp.

As Lisa Jardine relates in her account of the assassination of William the Silent of the Netherlands, in 1584, the small size, ease of concealment and user-friendly loading aspect of the wheellock, compared to larger and more cumbersome hand-held weapons, meant that it was used for the killing of public figures, such as Francis, Duke of Guise and William himself. Jardine also argues that a stray wheellock pistol shot may have been responsible for the St. Bartholomew's Day massacre of French Huguenots in 1572. The Venetian governor of Brescia, Giacomo Soranzo, banned wheellock guns in 1574.

Wheellock pistols were in common use during the Thirty Years' War (1618–1648) on both sides for cavalry and officers. Around 1650 the flintlock began to replace the wheellock as it was cheaper and easier to use than the wheellock.

Wheel-lock firearms were never mass-produced for military purposes, but the best preserved armoury collection at the Landeszeughaus in Graz, Austria, contains over 3,000 examples, many of which were produced in small batches for military units.

== Features ==
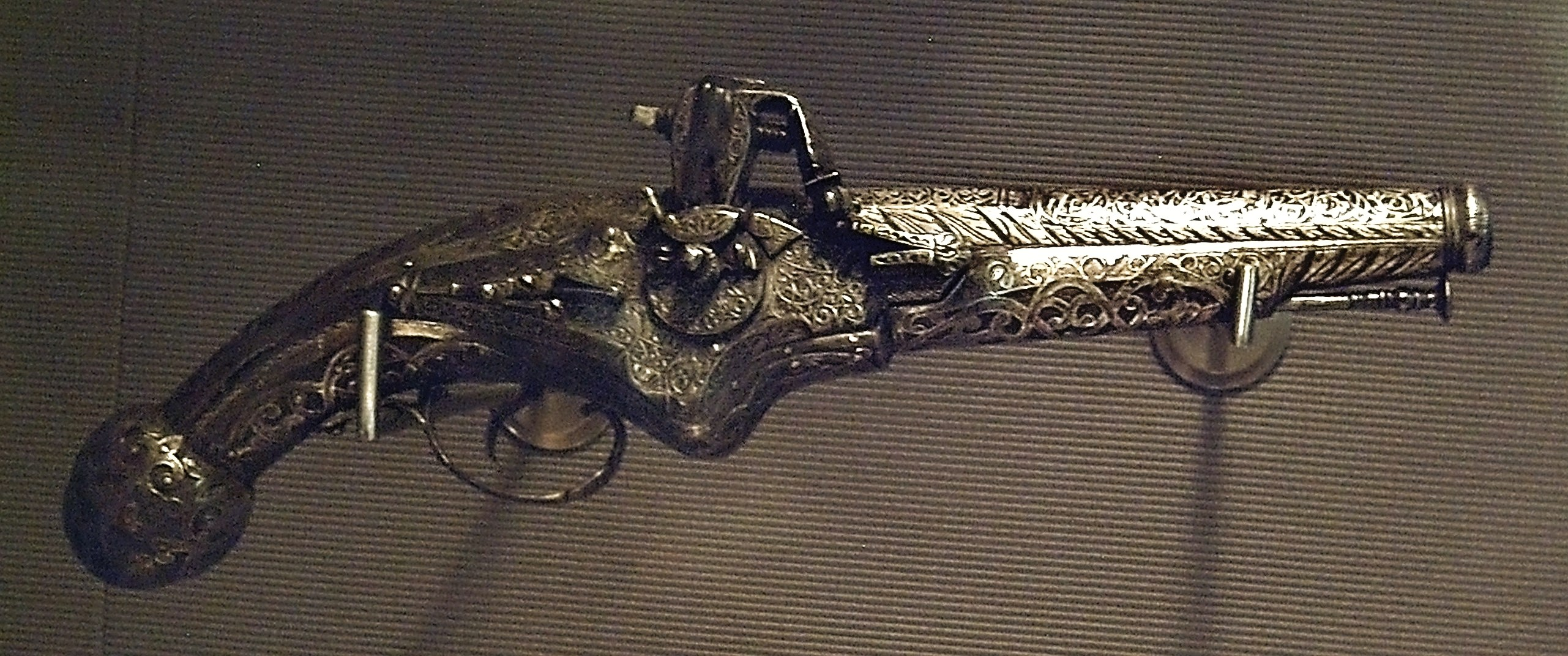
Spanish wheellock pistol from the late 17th century

Among the advantages of the wheellock was a better resistance to rain or damp conditions than the matchlock and the absence of a telltale glow, or smell from the burning slow match, itself a hazard in proximity to gunpowder. A slow match could be next to impossible to light in rain, but the wheellock allowed sparks to be generated in any weather, and the priming pan was fitted with a cover that was not opened until the instant the gun was fired. That made it feasible for the first time to conceal a firearm under clothing. The high production cost and complexity of the mechanism, however, hindered the wheellock's widespread adoption. A highly skilled gunsmith was required to build the mechanism, and the variety of parts and complex design made it liable to malfunction if it was not carefully maintained. Early models also had trouble with unreliable springs, but the problem was quickly solved.

The wheellock was used along with the matchlock until both were replaced by the simpler and less-costly flintlock, by the late 17th century. The wheellock mechanism however gave faster ignition than the flintlock, because the sparks were produced directly in the pan rather than having to fall a certain distance from the frizzen.

== See also ==
- Miquelet
- Percussion cap
