= Giacomo Soranzo =

Venetian diplomat

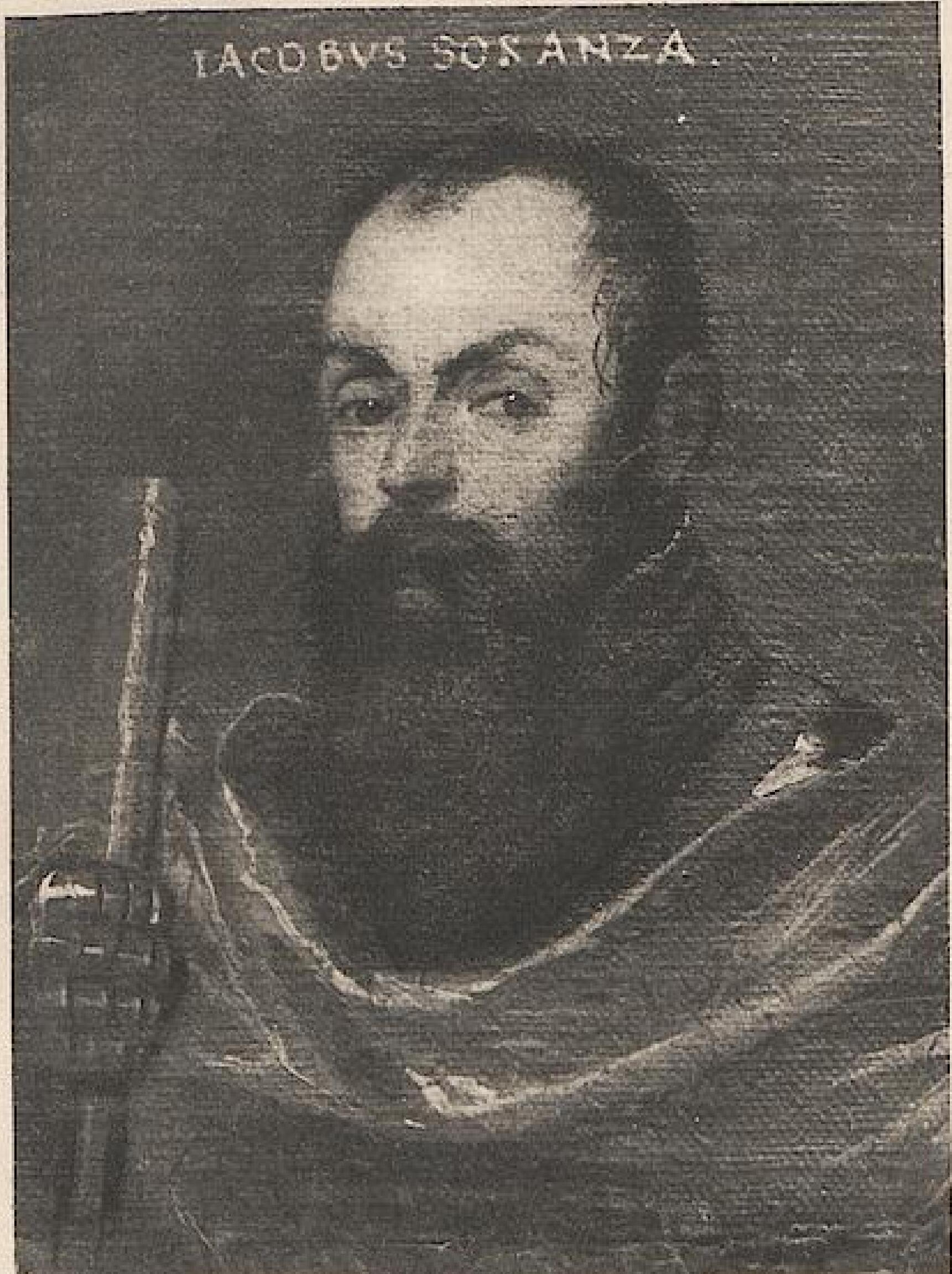
Giacomo Soranzo.

Giacomo Soranzo (1518–1599) was a Venetian diplomat, General Commissioner of the Fleet, and one of the Procurators of Saint Mark in 1575.

== Career ==
He was a son of Francesco Soranzo and a brother of Lorenzo Soranzo. Giacomo Soranzo served as a Venetian ambasador in England (1551–1554), France (1555–1558), Florence, Germany (to Ferdinand I, Holy Roman Emperor, 1559–1561), Rome (1562–1565), and Turkey, as Bailo (1566–1567).

As a Provveditore Generale di Terrafirma, in 1574 Soranzo banned the use of wheellock guns in Brescia to prevent feuding and banditry.

=== Relazioni ===
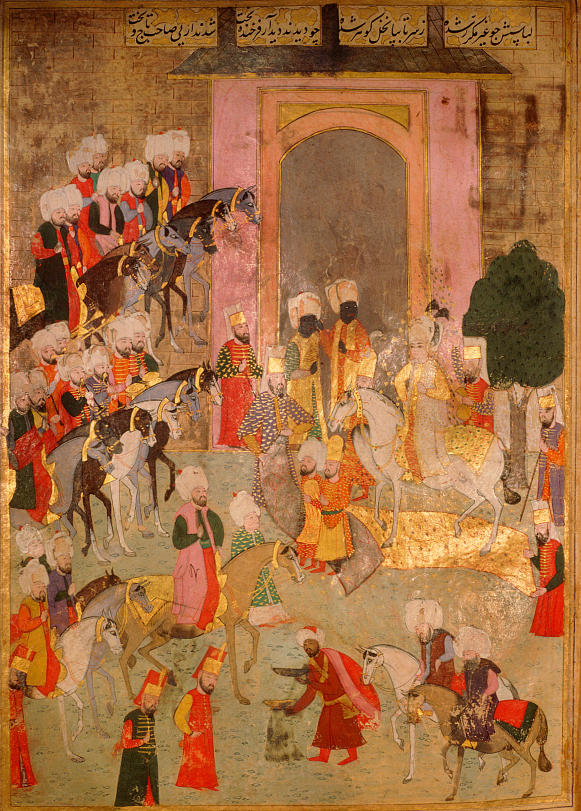
An event during the 1582 ceremonies in Istanbul

Giacomo Soranzo's diplomatic correspondence is thought to have been destroyed in a fire. He wrote several Relazioni for the Venetian state, papers detailing the customs and international policy of the countries where he was stationed. In August 1554, Soranzo wrote a Relazione describing England and recent events.

The Relazioni were copied and circulated. The author and language teacher Giacomo Castelvetro owned copies of Soranzo's 1576 and 1582 reports from Istanbul. In 1582, Soranzo attended the ceremony of the circumcision of Mehmed, son of Murad III. Castelvetro's copies of the Turkish reports are held by the Newberry Library in Chicago. A Fugger newsletter report of the festivities at Istanbul in 1582 mentions that the Venetian ambassador presented 150 gifts including four gold and several silk embroidered robes.

=== England ===
Soranzo arrived in England as ambassador to the court of Edward VI in June 1551. Jean Scheyfve wrote that he was young and well educated. He described the new epidemic of the "sweating sickness". The king was busy practicing martial sports and immersed in his studies.

Soranzo was knighted by Edward at Westminster Palace on 5 February 1553. Scheyfve noticed that he was frequently with the Duke of Northumberland and was close to the French ambassador René de Laval de Boisdauphin. Scheyfve guessed Soranzo was working on a plan for Princess Mary to marry Alfonso II d'Este. As Edward's health worsened in June 1553, Soranzo visited Elizabeth and Mary. According to his Relazione, Soranzo bought Venetian luxury goods for Mary before and after her accession. Edward VI died from tuberculosis according to Soranzo, but the diagnosis is uncertain.

Soranzo advised Mary to leave London during the succession crisis and rode out from London to greet her in July 1553 on her return. After a discussion with the "cloaked" French ambassador Antoine de Noailles in September 1553, they found common ground to try to prevent the wedding of Mary I of England and Philip of Spain.

Soranzo attended Mary's coronation on 1 October, spending freely to represent the magnificence of the Venetian Republic, (he was later reimbursed). Later in October, Simon Renard wrote to Charles V that Soranzo had forgotten his duty to Venice to forward French interests, but the ambassadors' efforts to prevent the Habsburg marriage had failed.

Simon Renard wrote that Soranzo's house in London was full of spies. According to Renard, Mary was informed that Soranzo and Noailles had been in touch with Edward Courtenay, (suggested as a husband for Queen Mary). When Noailles and Soranzo's informant told them this news they started to be more careful and discreet. It has been suggested that Noailles' informant on this occasion was John Leigh, a son of Lord Edmund Howard. Soon after, Queen Mary told Renard that Courtenay's mother Gertrude Courtenay had discussed a supper party for her son with Noailles at Soranzo's house which needed her approval. Renard suspected the supper was arranged by Soranzo to sound out Mary's disposition. In December 1553, the Venetian Council of Ten were critical of Soranzo's informal alliance with France and its object.

Noailles and Soranzo gave some encouragement to Wyatt's rebellion in 1554. Soranzo was said to have supplied the rebels with guns from a Venetian merchant ship in the Thames. According to Renard, the Admiral William Howard did not accept Soranzo's excuse, and Sebastian Cabot denounced his intrigues. The Council of Ten acknowledged the suspicions of Charles V that Soranzo had performed "some evil office in the matter of the marriage". Although he was recalled from England, Mary gave him a gold chain and he escaped censure in Venice.

=== Soranzo on English court fashion ===
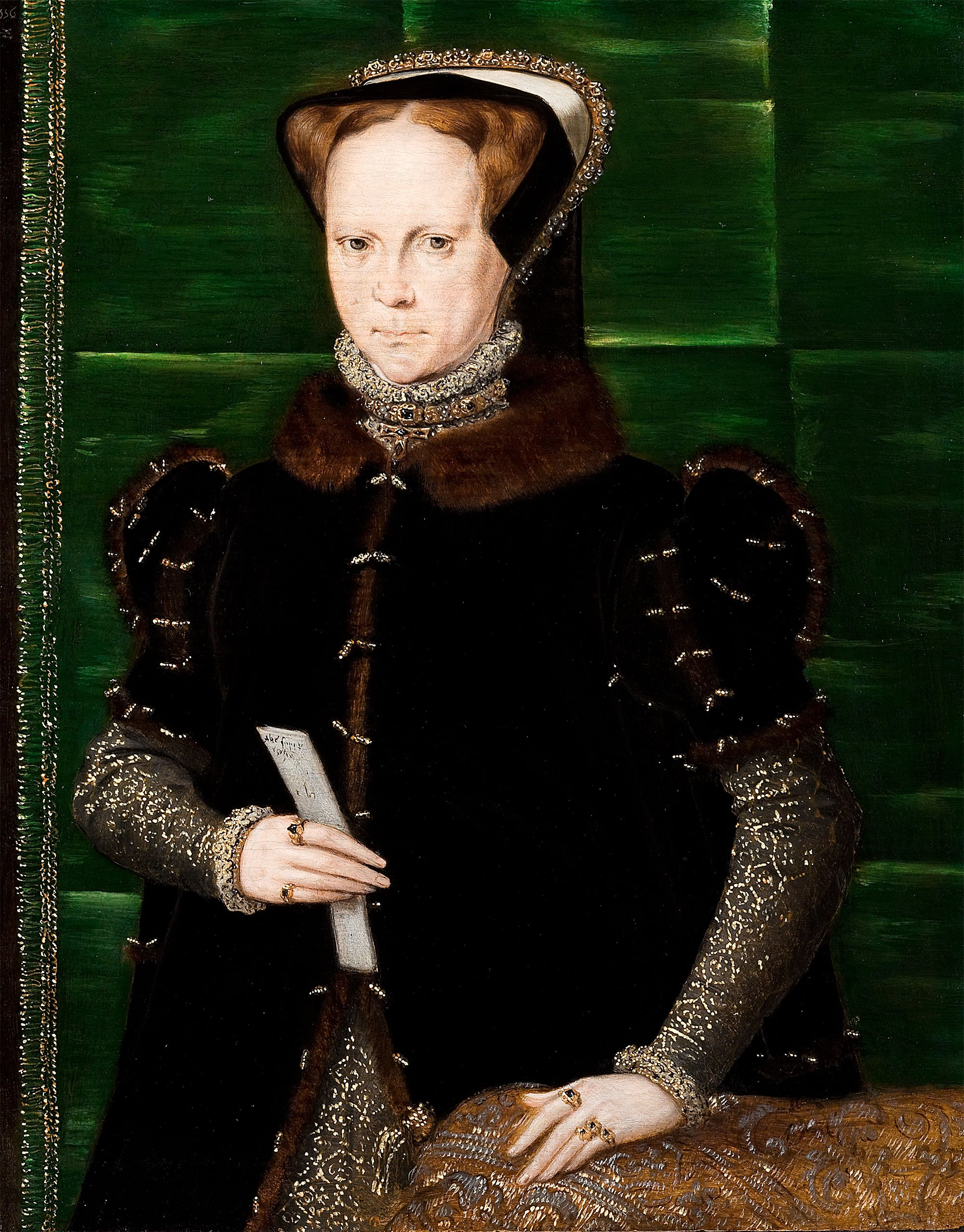
Mary I, by Hans Eworth, thought to be wearing a "loose gown".

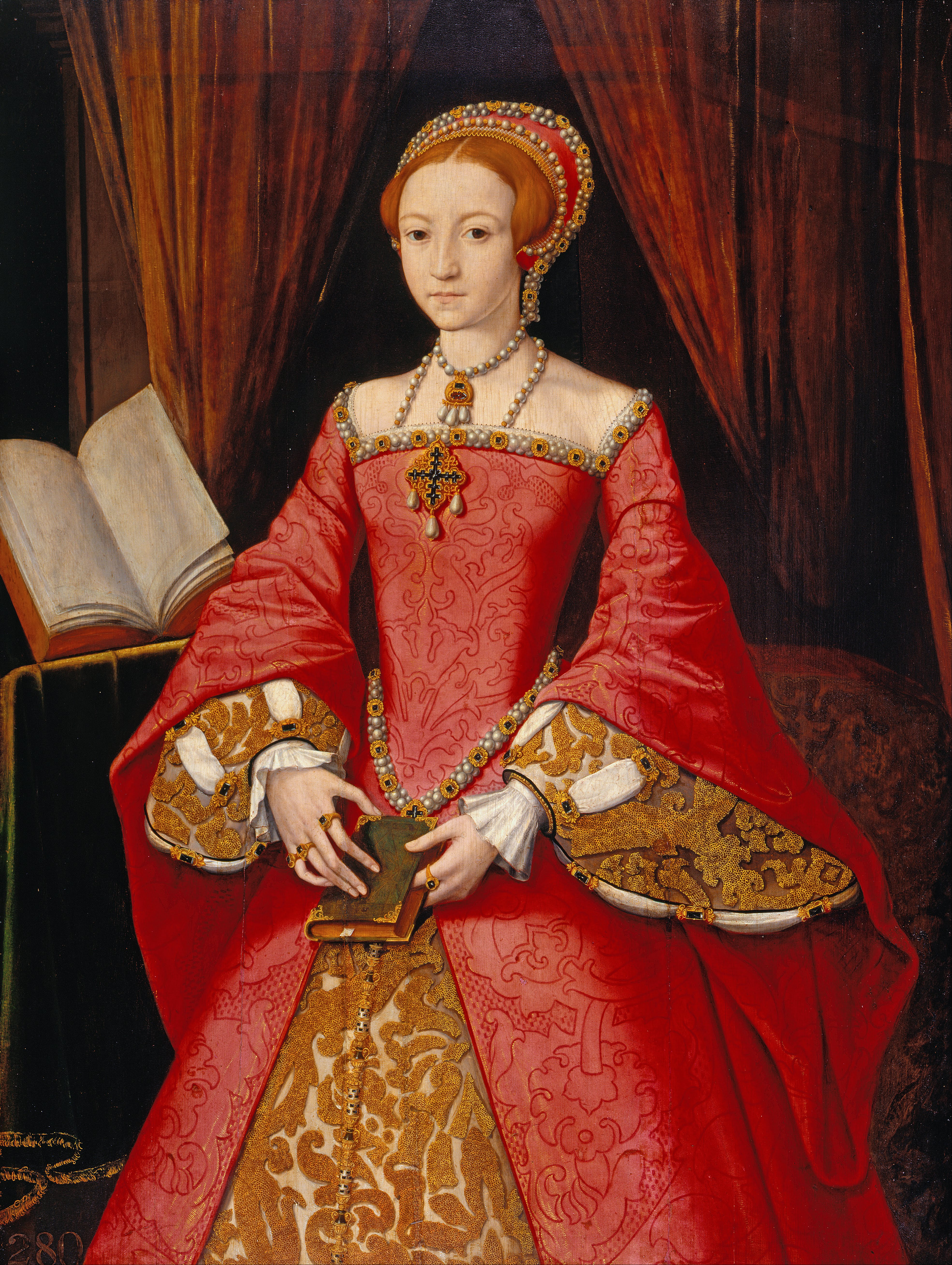
"Elizabeth as a Princess", attributed to William Scrots, dressed in the "French fashion".

Soranzo's descriptions of the appearance of Mary I of England and her costume and jewellery are frequently quoted by historians. Soranzo wrote that on state occasions she wore a gown and a bodice with French-style sleeves, and at other times fashions like those usually worn by women in England (which also appeared French to his eye). In his Relazione, Soranzo commented:

Ma sopra ogni altra cosa le piace vestir ornata; e superbamente, e li vestiti suoi sono in due modi; uno con una veste come portano gli uomini, ma assai stretta, con un'altra veste di sotto con la coda molto lunga, e la porta ordinariamente, siccome la portano anco le signore inglesi; e l'altro una veste con il busto e con le maniche; larghe rinversate, come usano le francesi, e usa di portar questo nelli giorni pi solenni, e porta molti ricami e vesti e sopravvesti d'oro e d'argento di molto valore, e si muta ogni giorno. Usa anche molte gioie; portandole e sopra il capperone che porta in testa, e al collo, per guarnimento delle vesti.

Above all else she likes to dress ornately, and superbly, and her clothes are of two kinds. A robe (or garment) like that worn by men but very tight, with another dress underneath with a very long train, which she wears ordinarily, as English ladies wear. On the most solemn days, she is accustomed to wearing the dress with a bodice and sleeves, wide and turned up, as worn by French women. She wears a lot of embroidery and dresses and overdresses of gold and silver cloth of great value, and she changes them every day. She makes great use of jewels, wearing them on her chaperon (or French hood), and round her neck, and as trimming for her gowns.

Roy Strong suggests Soranzo's description of two styles as a useful guide to costume in portraits. The subject is complex. Costume historians have been able to relate these remarks to wardrobe accounts and warrants. The ordinary costume seems to have been a new style called a "loose gown" in the royal accounts, though Soranzo mentioned it was a close fit. The "loose gown" was worn with a "French kirtle". A costume historian of an earlier generation, Herbert Norris, had suggested the tight-fitting everyday garment mentioned by Soranzo was a Spanish-style surcote.

In the Relazione, Soranzo also says more generally that English women's costume was French in style while men's clothes appeared Italian, l'abito uomini è assai conforme coll'italiano, e quello delle donne col francese. Soranzo's diplomatic colleague, Noailles also mentioned French-style sleeves in his dispatches and reported that Elizabeth and Anne of Cleves wore French gowns of cloth of silver at Mary's coronation.

=== France ===
Giacomo Soranzo was sent to the French court in 1554, despite misgivings about his activities in England. In November 1557, he reported on the forthcoming marriage of Mary, Queen of Scots, and Francis, Dauphin of France, noting that the Dauphin Francis was still of a weak constitution. He wrote approvingly of the role and initiatives taken by Catherine de' Medici in the government of France. In December, he was joined by Giovanni Michiel.

== Death and monument ==
Giacomo Soranzo was banshed from Venice for two years in 1584 for revealing secrets. He died in March 1599 and was buried in the Santa Maria degli Angeli, Murano. His monument was carved and signed by Alessandro Vittoria. The portrait bust has been attributed to Vittoria's workshop.
