= Conquest of Tunis (1573) =

Spanish victory over the Ottomans

- Part of Spanish–Ottoman wars
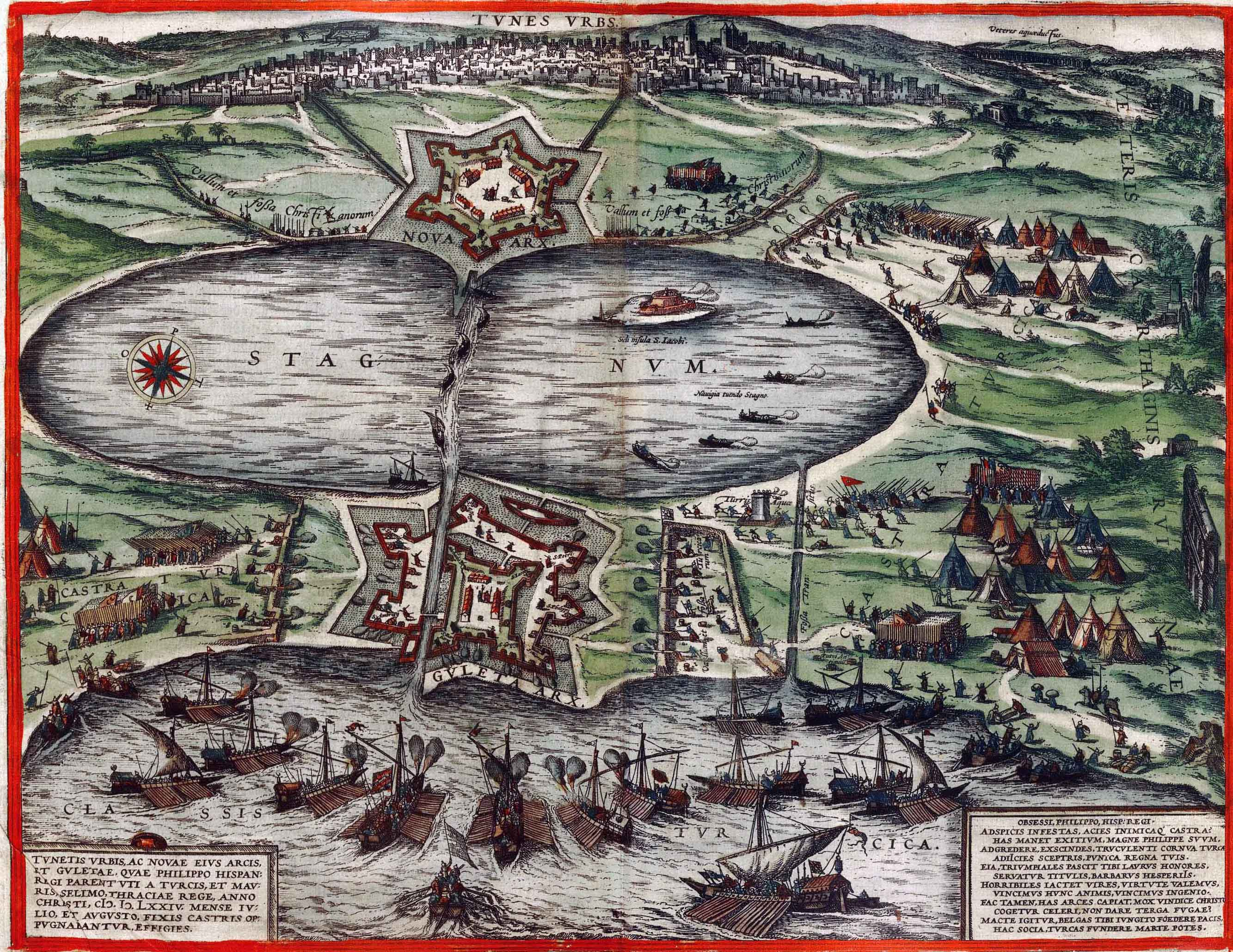
Date	1573
Location	Tunis
Result	Spanish victory
Territorial changes	Tunis is conquered by Spain

Belligerents
(Spain) Spanish Empire	Regency of Algiers; Ottoman Empire

Commanders and leaders
John of Austria; Álvaro de Bazán	Muley Hamida

Units involved
104 galleys 44 sail ships 60 small ships 20,000 soldiers	Unknown

Casualties and losses
None	Unknown

The Conquest of Tunis in 1573 was a Spanish campaign led by John of Austria to conquer Tunis. It was carried on in the wake of the Battle of Lepanto, after the conclusion of the Holy League.

== Background ==
With the victory of the Battle of Lepanto, John of Austria pushed for actions to capitalize on the Christian momentum. His first attempt to besiege Navarino in 1572 was fruitless, being forced to retire, although in its course his admiral Álvaro de Bazán captured an enemy galley commanded by a grandson of Hayreddin Barbarossa, after which they confirmed the Ottomans' mostly defensive attitude. A new grand campaign was cancelled with the disbanding of the Holy League and the negotiations between the Ottomans and the Republic of Venice, leading the Spanish Monarchy to ponder about a new conquest in Africa. Knowing the Spanish garrison in the La Goleta fort in Tunis was still besieged since the 1569 capture of the city by Occhiali, this was the chosen target.

Although most of the Spanish Empire's resources were focused in the Atlantic Ocean, deeming the Mediterranean Sea was a theater free of strategic dangers after the outcome of Lepanto, Don John gathered 152 galleys, many of them Ottoman vessels captured in the battle. This would be one of the main displays of Hispanic naval power up to the point. Don John would take 104 galleys and other support vessels while Giovanni Andrea Doria stayed in Sicily with 48 galleys, guarding against possible political turmoil in the Republic of Genoa. Back in Spain, King Philip II was unsure of the operation; he believed that the only profit coming from the conquest and control of Tunis would be denying the Ottomans from using its ports.

== The siege ==
The capture of the city was bloodless. As long as John of Austria's fleet arrived in Tunis, the local population mutinied against the Turk garrison, capturing many of them. A galley with 220 Christian slaves were handed over to Don John, who gave the city's throne to Muley Mohammed, brother and enemy to Muley Hamida, Tunis' Ottoman ruler.

== Consequences ==
The battle was followed by a campaign by the Ottoman fleet led by Occhiali, who performed minor raids before returning. However, Occhiali would retake Tunis the following year due to the disbanding of the Spanish fleet.

== Bibliography ==
- García Hernán, Enrique; Maffi, Davide (2006). Guerra y sociedad en la monarquía hispánica: política, estrategia y cultura en la Europa Moderna, 1500-1700. Laberinto. ISBN 9781399070157.
- Mira Caballos, Esteban (2015). El sistema naval del Imperio español: Armadas, flotas y galeones en el siglo XVI. Punto de Vista. ISBN 978-8415930679.
- Rodríguez González, Agustín (2017). Álvaro de Bazán, Capitán general del Mar Océano. EDAF. ISBN 978-8441437791.
