= Holy League (1571) =

Catholic southern European alliance (1571)

- Foedus Sacrum
- Founder: Pope Pius V
- Leaders: (Papal States) Pius V; (Papal States) Marcantonio Colonna; (Spanish Empire) Philip II; (Spanish Empire) Don John of Austria; (Spanish Empire) Álvaro de Bazán; (Republic of Venice) Alvise I Mocenigo; (Republic of Venice) Sebastiano Venier; (Republic of Venice) Agostino Barbarigo; (Republic of Genoa) Paolo Giustiniani Moneglia (until 6 October); (Republic of Genoa) Giannotto Lomellini (from 10 October); (Republic of Genoa) Gianandrea Doria; (Order of Knights of the Hospital of Saint John of Jerusalem) Pierre de Monte; (Grand Duchy of Tuscany) Cosimo I de' Medici; (Duchy of Savoy) Emmanuel Philibert; Guidobaldo II della Rovere
- Dates active: 15 May 1571 to 25 May 1572
- Country: Papal States; Spanish Empire (including (Kingdom of Naples) Naples and (Kingdom of Sicily) Sicily); Republic of Venice; Republic of Genoa; (Order of Knights of the Hospital of Saint John of Jerusalem) Knights of Malta; Grand Duchy of Tuscany and the Order of Saint Stephen; Duchy of Savoy; Duchy of Urbino
- Allegiance: Latin Church
- Active regions: Eastern Mediterranean Sea
- Ideology: Crusading Movement

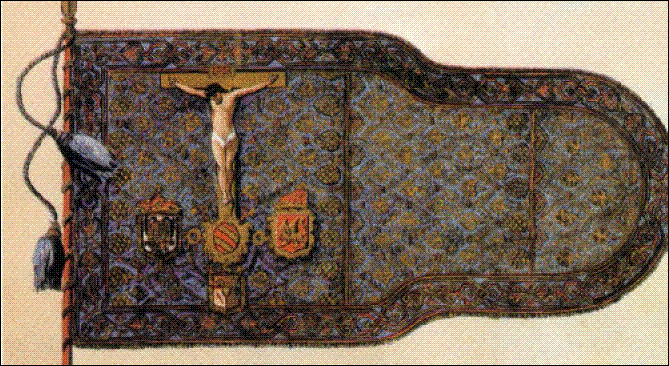
The banner of the Holy League, flown by John of Austria on his flagship Real. It is made of blue damask interwoven with gold thread, of a length of 7.3 m and a width of 4.4 m at the hoist. It displays the crucified Christ above the coats of arms of Pius V, of Venice, of Charles V, and of John of Austria. The coats of arms are linked by chains symbolizing the alliance. The banner was given to Toledo Cathedral in 1616 by Philip III of Spain. It was moved to the Museum of Santa Cruz in 1961.

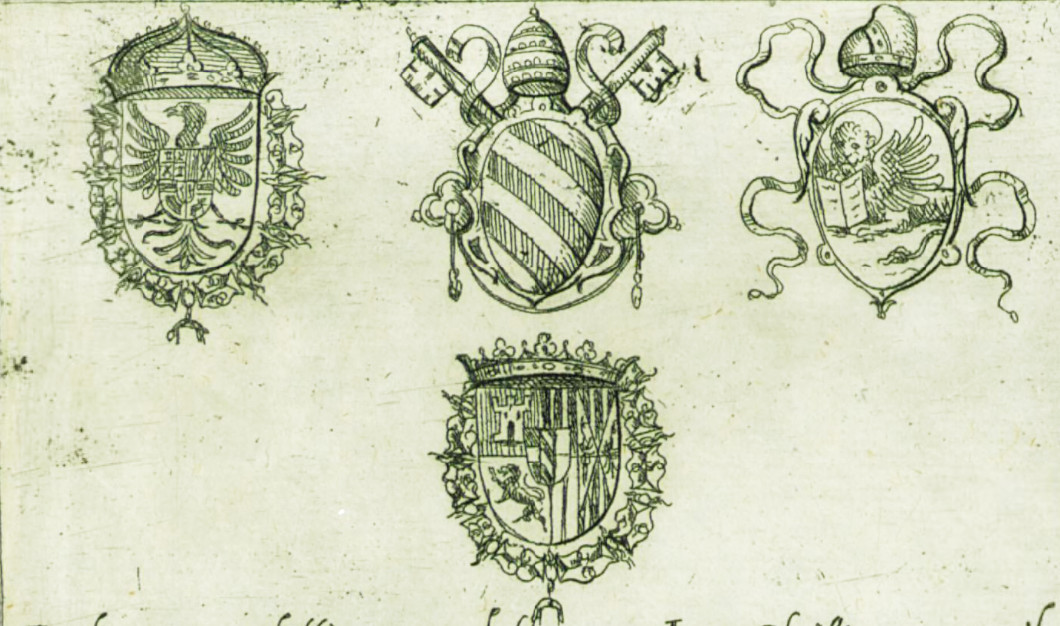
The coats of arms of the leaders of the Holy League (Habsburg Spain, Pope Pius V, Republic of Venice, John of Austria) as depicted in the printed order of battle published on 14 November 1571 by Antonio Lafreri in Rome.

The Holy League (Latin: Foedus Sacrum, Spanish: Liga Santa, Italian: Lega Santa) of 1571 was a military coalition arranged by Pope Pius V that included the major Catholic powers of southern Europe (Iberian Peninsula and Italian Peninsula), specifically the Spanish Empire as well as the Italian maritime powers. It was intended to break the Ottoman Empire’s control of the eastern Mediterranean Sea. It was formally opened on 15 May 1571 and closed on 25 May 1572.

== Members ==
The League's members were:

- the Papal States under Pius V,
- Spanish Empire under Philip II (including Naples and Sicily),
- the Republic of Venice,
- the Republic of Genoa,
- the Knights of Malta,
- the Grand Duchy of Tuscany and the Order of Saint Stephen under Cosimo I de' Medici,
- the Duchy of Savoy under Emmanuel Philibert,
- the Duchy of Urbino under Guidobaldo II della Rovere,
- the Duchy of Parma under Ottavio Farnese.

== Forces and strength ==
These Christian states were to have a force of 200 galleys, 100 other ships, 50,000 infantry, 4,500 cavalry and adequate artillery ready by 1 April each year. John of Austria, illegitimate half-brother of King Philip II of Spain, was designated supreme commander. The League kept membership open for the Holy Roman Empire, France and Portugal, but none of them joined. The Empire preferred to maintain its truce with Constantinople, while France had an active anti-Spanish alliance with the Ottomans. Portugal had no forces to spare, owing to its heavy engagement in its own Moroccan campaign, its ongoing maritime confrontations with the Ottomans in the Red Sea and the Indian Ocean, and colonial conflicts with the Malaccan and Johorean Sultanates.

== History ==
=== Engagements ===
The League initially assembled a fleet to aid the Venetian defenders of Cyprus which was invaded by Ottoman forces under the command of Lala Mustafa in July 1570, but was too late to prevent the island's capture by the Ottomans.

On 7 October 1571, the League won a decisive victory over the Ottoman fleet at the Battle of Lepanto in the Gulf of Patras. The fleet of the Holy League in this engagement consisted of 212 warships (206 galleys and 6 galleasses, the modern large galleys developed by Venice) with 1,815 guns and carrying 28,500 infantry soldiers. The majority of warships were Venetian (6 galleasses, 109 galleys), the next largest contingent were Spanish (49 galleys, including 26 galleys from Naples, Sicily and other Italian territories), and Genoese (27 galleys), with additional warships from the Papal States (seven galleys), the Order of Saint Stephen from the Grand Duchy of Tuscany (five galleys), the Duchy of Savoy and the Knights of Malta (three galleys each), and some privately owned galleys in Spanish service.

The victory at Lepanto confirmed the de facto division of the Mediterranean, with the eastern half under firm Ottoman control and the western half under the Habsburgs and their Italian allies.

The following year, as the allied Christian fleet resumed operations, it faced a renewed Ottoman navy of 200 vessels under Kılıç Ali Pasha in the skirmish at Cerigo Channel, but the Ottoman commander actively avoided engaging the allied fleet and headed for the safety of the fortress of Modon. The arrival of the Spanish squadron of 55 ships evened the numbers on both sides and opened the opportunity for a decisive blow with the siege of Navarino, but friction among the Christian leaders and the reluctance of Don John squandered the opportunity. the holy league attempted to capture Navarino but failed.

=== Demise ===
Pius V died on 1 May 1572. The diverging interests of the League members began to show, and the alliance began to unravel. In 1573, the Holy League fleet failed to sail altogether; instead, Don John attacked and took Tunis, only for it to be retaken by the Ottomans in 1574. Venice, fearing the loss of her Dalmatian possessions and a possible invasion of Friuli, and eager to cut her losses and resume the trade with the Ottoman Empire, initiated unilateral negotiations with the Porte. The Holy League was disbanded with the peace treaty of 7 March 1573, which concluded the War of Cyprus.

== See also ==
- Holy League of Pope Clement VIII
- Great Siege of Malta
- Ottoman–Venetian War (1570–73)
- Battle of Lepanto order of battle
- Siege of Navarino (1572)
