= Filippo Colonna =

Filippo Colonna may refer to several Princes of Paliano:

- Filippo I Colonna (1578–1639)
- Filippo II Colonna (1663–1714), great-grandson of Filippo I
