= Paolo Spinola, 3rd Marquis of Los Balbases =

Spanish nobleman and diplomat

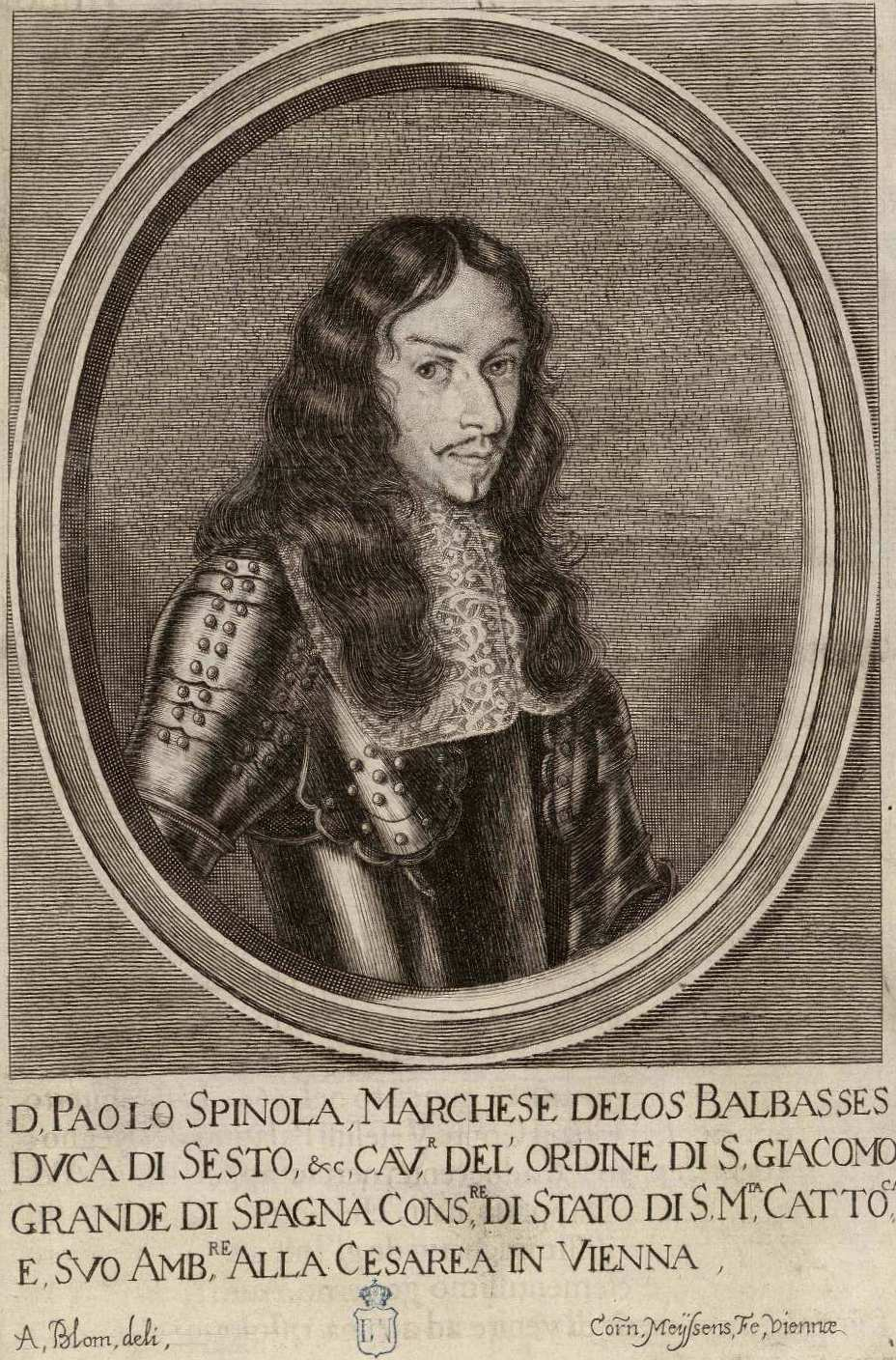
Portrait of Paolo Spinola by Cornelis Meyssens

Paolo Spinola or Pablo Spínola Doria (24 February 1628 – 24 December 1699), 3rd Marquis of the Balbases and 3rd Duke of San Severino and Sesto, was a Spanish nobleman of Italian descent and a diplomat.

== Biography ==
Spinola was born in 1628, the son of Filippo Spinola, 2nd Marquis of Los Balbases and Geronima Doria. His grandfather was the Italian-Spanish general and banker Ambrogio Spinola.

Paolo was Governor of the Duchy of Milan during 1668 and 1670 after which he was replaced by Gaspar Téllez-Girón, 5th Duke de Osuna.

He was Spanish ambassador to Vienna between 1670 and 1676 and then to Paris in 1677.

== Family ==
In 1653, he married Anna Colonna (daughter of Marcantonio V Colonna, Prince of Paliano) in Rome. Their children were:

- Isabella Spinola (died 1700) - married Francesco Maria Spinola, 3rd Duke of San Pietro in Galatina.
- Teresa Antonia Spinola (born 23 October 1659) - married Martín Domingo de Guzmán, 4th Marquis of Montealegre.
- Felipe Antonio Spinola, 4th Marquis of the Balbases (1665–1721) - Viceroy of Sicily who married Isabel Maria de la Cerda (1667–1708), daughter of Juan Francisco de la Cerda, Duke of Medinaceli.
- Luisa Spinola - married Gregorio Januario de Bracamonte y Bracamonte.
- Antonia Spínola (died 1744) - married Marino Francesco Caracciolo (1688–1727), 6th Prince of Avellino.
