= Felipe Antonio Spinola, 4th Marquis of Los Balbases =

Carlo Filippo Antonio Spinola y Colonna, 4th Marquis of the Balbases (Madrid, Spain, 11 November 1665 – 30 July 1721), was Viceroy of Sicily from 1707 to 1713, during the Spanish Succession War.

He was the eldest son of Paolo Spinola, 3rd Marquis of the Balbases, Governor of the Duchy of Milan from 1668 to 1670. After his father's death, he became 4th Duke of Sesto and 4th Marquis of the Balbases.

His mother, Anna Colonna (1629–1686), was a daughter of Marcantonio V Colonna, Prince of Paliano during the period 1639–1659.

He married, Madrid, 20 September 1682, Isabel María de la Cerda y Aragón (1667–1707), a daughter of Juan Francisco de la Cerda, 8th Duke of Medinaceli (1637–1691), and Catalina de Aragón-Folch de Cardona, duchess of Cardona, Segorbe, and Lerma, having 2 sons and 7 daughters, as well as three bastards, one male, 2 females.

The eldest son, 5th Duke of Sesto and 5th Marquis of the Balbases from 1721, was Ambrosio Gaetano Spinola y de la Cerda (Milan, Italy, 20 January 1696 – 1757), who became a Knight of the Order of the Golden Fleece in 1737.

After the Treaty of Utrecht, Spinola and his troops were ordered to leave Sicily and sail to Barcelona, where they played an important role in the Siege of Barcelona (1713–14).

Spinola was the dedicatee of Tomaso Albinoni's 12 Concerti a cinque, Op. 5 (1707), and of Giacomo Facco's 12 Concerti a cinque "Pensieri Adriarmonici", Op. 1 (1716–1719).

Government offices
Preceded by Isidoro de la Cueva y Benavides	Viceroy of Sicily; 1707–1713	Succeeded by ceded to the Duchy of Savoy
