= Carlo Colonna =

Italian cardinal (1665–1739)

His Eminence Carlo Colonna
- Cardinal-Deacon of Sant'Agata de' Goti
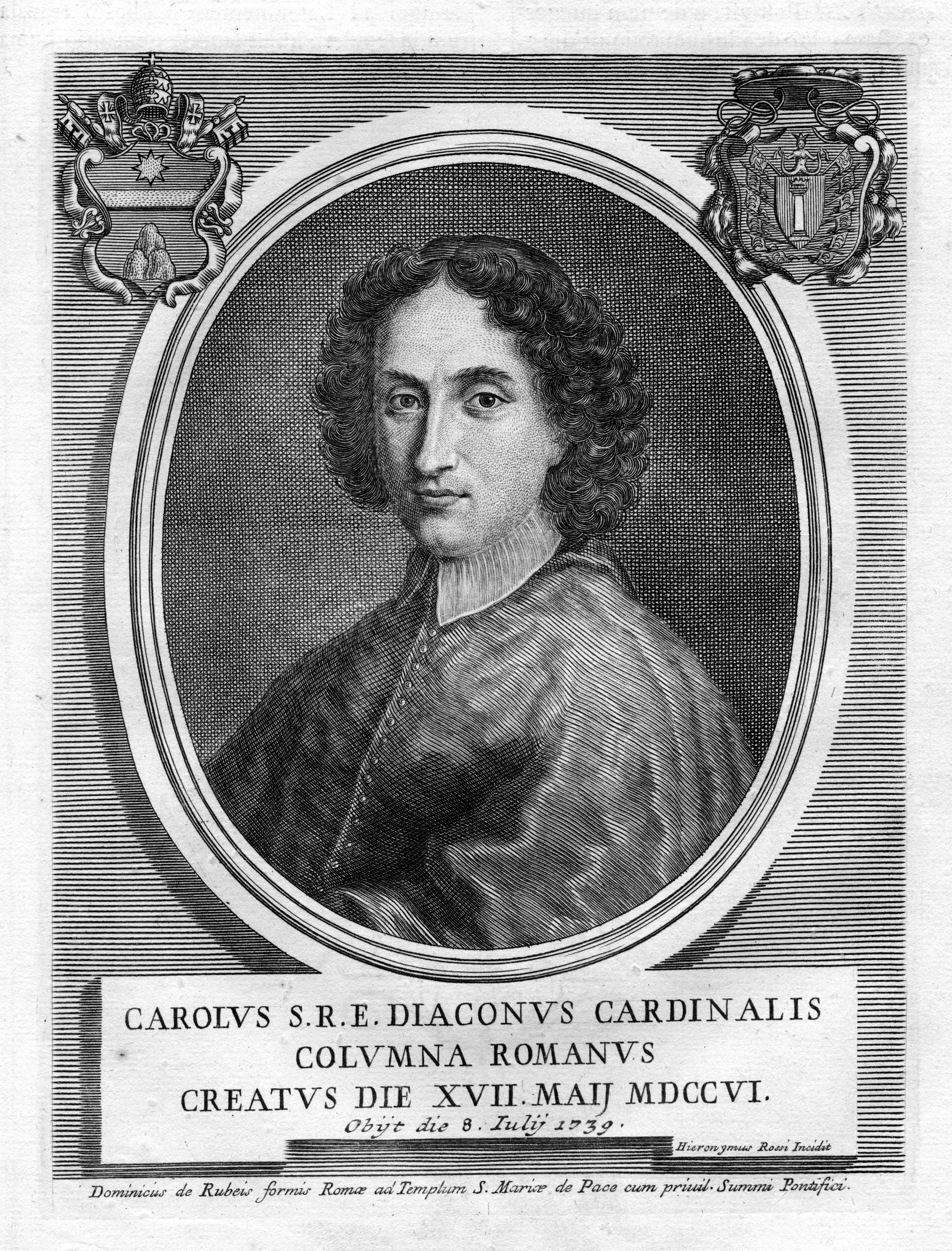
- Church: Catholic Church

Personal details
- Born: November 17, 1665 Rome, Italy
- Died: July 8, 1739 (age 73)

Carlo Colonna (November 17, 1665 – July 8, 1739) was a Roman Catholic cardinal.

== Biography ==
Carlo Colonna was born on November 17, 1665, in Rome, Italy, the third child of Lorenzo Onofrio Colonna, prince and duke of Paliano, and Maria Mancini, niece of Cardinal Jules Raymond Mazarin. Per his portrait, he was made Cardinal-Deacon on "XVII Maij MDCCVI" (17 May 1706), and died 8 July 1739.

Catholic Church titles
Preceded by Domenico Tarugi	Cardinal-Deacon of Santa Maria della Scala; 1706–1715	Succeeded by Alessandro Falconieri
Preceded by Francesco Barberini (iuniore)	Cardinal-Deacon of Sant'Angelo in Pescheria; 1715–1730	Succeeded by Prospero II Colonna
Preceded by Lorenzo Altieri	Cardinal-Deacon of Sant'Agata de' Goti; 1730–1739	Succeeded by Carlo Maria Marini
