= Bernardino Ludovisi =

Italian sculptor

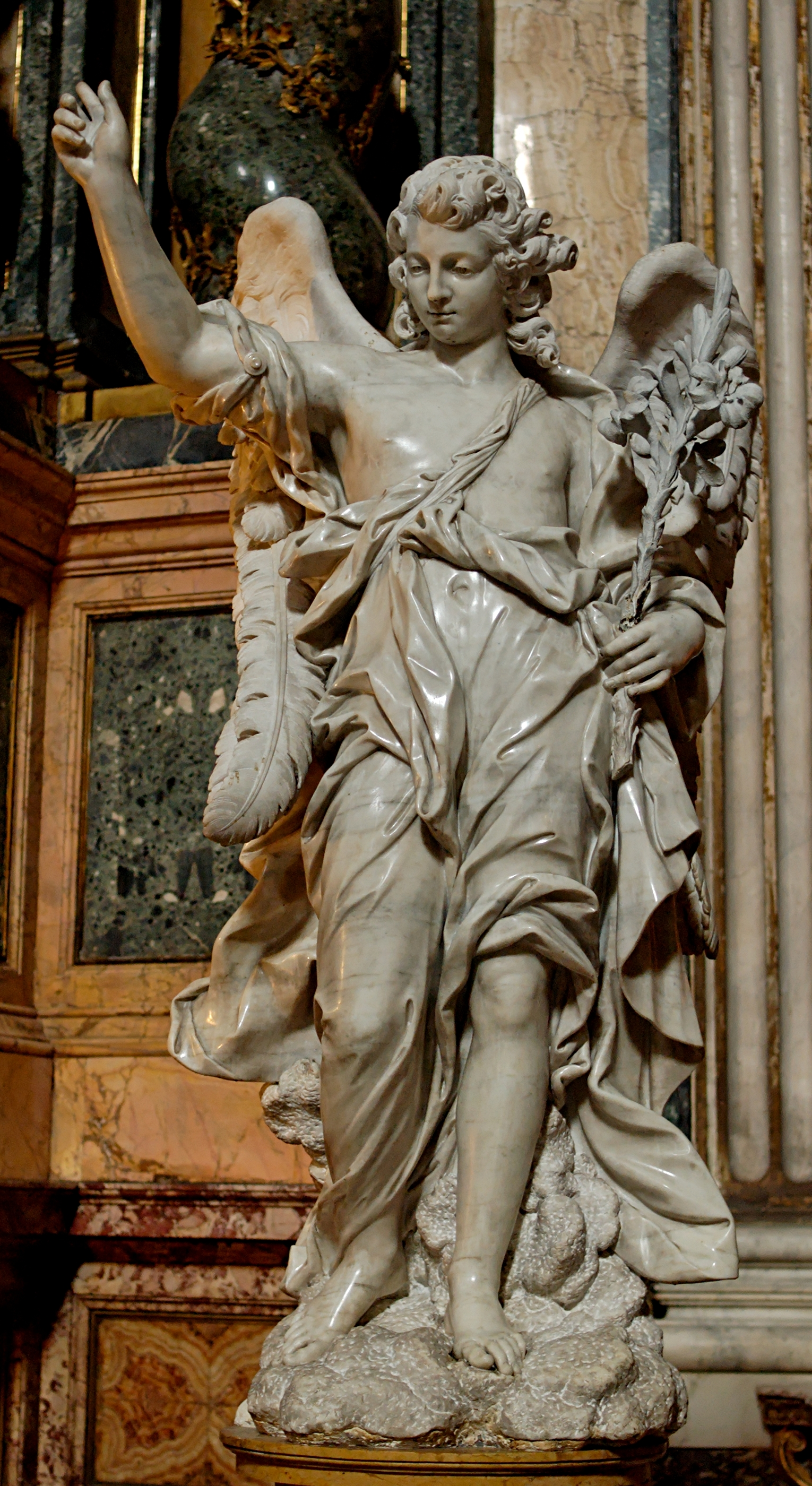
Angel bearing Lilies, Altar of S Luigi Gonzaga in Sant'Ignazio, Rome; c. 1748.

Bernardino Ludovisi (c. 1693 – 11 December 1749), also called Bernardo, was an Italian sculptor.

== Life and work ==
Little is known of his life. The Ludovisi were an ancient Italian family, originally from Bologna. Bernardino seems to have spent most, if not all, of his career in Rome. He is an example of a working sculptor of his time, proficient in his craft but largely forgotten today.

Ludovisi participated in several prominent sculptural projects of his day, such as the Trevi Fountain, the ongoing sculptural works of St Peter’s, and the façade of St John Lateran. He was one of six Italian sculptors allotted subsidiary tasks to the French masters Pierre Le Gros and Jean-Baptiste Théodon working on the Chapel of St Ignatius in Il Gesù. He was also one of the sculptors commissioned by King João V of Portugal to supply sculpture to his palatial complex at Mafra. Towards the end of his life he was employed by the Colonna family, prominent patrons of the arts, for whom he completed the funerary monuments of Filippo II Colonna and Maria Rospigliosi Salviati (the latter commissioned by her relative, Caterina Salviati Colonna), as well as a portrait bust of Pope Benedict XIV (a gift from Monsignor—later Cardinal—Marcantonio Colonna to the Pontiff).

Ludovisi began in the vein of Baroque classicism, but as he matured he began to lean toward the French style of Le Gros and the Rococo, exemplifying a later, gentler variation of Italian Baroque which Enggass named barocchetto. His work is characterised by an attention to detail, an effective use of colour, and a painterly manner in his reliefs.

== List of known works ==
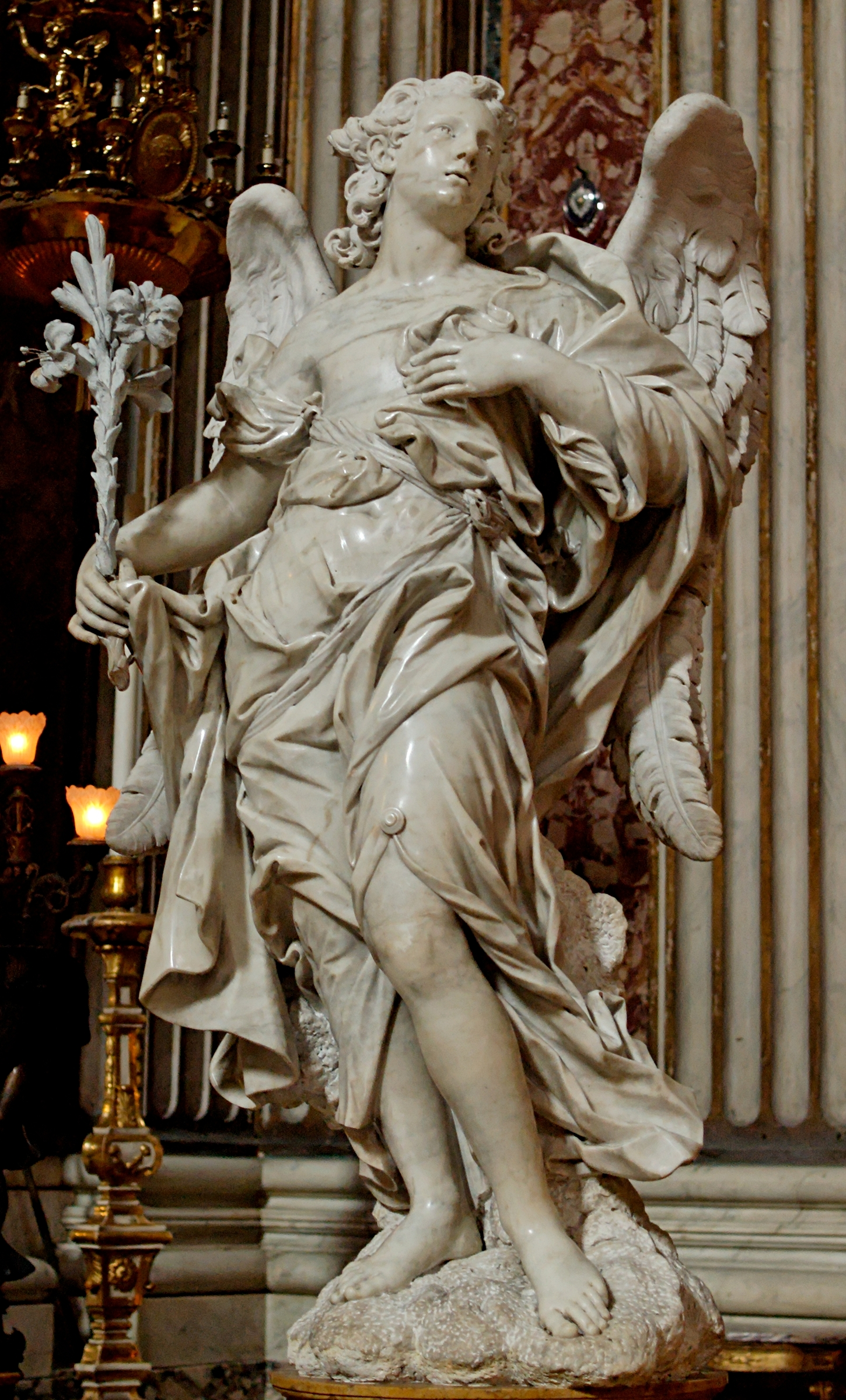
Angel bearing Lilies, Altar of S Luigi Gonzaga in Sant'Ignazio, Rome; c. 1748.

- Four Evangelists (stucco, c.1723–1724), façade of Santissima Trinità dei Pellegrini, Rome.
- God the Father (marble, bronze and lapis lazuli, 1726), Chapel of St Ignatius, Il Gesù, Rome.
- Charity (terracotta, c. 1728), Museo di Palazzo Venezia, Rome (attributed).
- Bust of Cardinal Pompeo Aldrovandi (1728), Accademia di Belle Arti di Bologna.
- Charity (travertine, 1728–1730), St Peters, Vatican, Rome.
- St Cajetan of Thiene (marble, 1733), portico, Basilica, Mafra, Portugal.
- St Francis of Paola (marble, 1733), portico, Basilica, Mafra, Portugal.
- St Augustine (travertine, c.1735), atop the crowning balustrade of the main façade, S. Giovanni in Laterno, Rome.
- Naming of John the Baptist (relief, c. 1735), narthex, S. Giovanni in Laterno, Rome.
- Caritas Romana (terracotta, c. 1735), State Hermitage Museum, St Petersburg.
- Fertility of the Fields (marble, 1736), Trevi Fountain, Rome.
- Angels and cherub heads (stucco, c. 1735–1740), presbytery, S. Maria degli Angeli, Rome.
- Mary Magdalene (marble, c. 1735–1740), Spencer Museum of Art, University of Kansas, Lawrence (attributed).
- Caritas Romana (marble, 1737), Jardim do Ultramar, Lisbon.
- Copy of Caritas Romana (marble, date unknown), Museo de Arte de Ponce, Puerto Rico (artist unknown).
- Winged Glory (terracotta, c. 1742), State Hermitage Museum, St Petersburg.
- Giovanni Patrizj Offers His Riches to the Pope (marble relief, 1743), narthex, S. Maria Maggiore, Rome.
- Unidentified Pope (Travertine, c. 1743–1744), atop façade, S. Maria Maggiore, Rome.
- St John the Baptist Preaching in the Wilderness (marble relief, 1743–1747), vault, Chapel of St John the Baptist, São Roque, Lisbon.
- Two Putti (silver, 1743–1747) flanking Adoration of the Lamb of God altar frontal, Museu de São Roque, Lisbon.
- Tomb of Giorgio Cardinal Spinola (white & polychrome marbles, gesso, bronze, 1744), left aisle, S. Salvatore alle Coppelle, Rome.
- Tomb of Prince Filippo II Colonna (white & coloured marbles with gilt bronze, 1745), S. Andrea, Paliano, Italy.
- Portrait Bust of Pope Benedict XIV (white marble, gilt bronze, precious stones, 1746), private collection.
- Glory of Angels (marble, gilt bronze & stucco, 1747), presbytery, Sant'Apollinare, Rome.
- Angels Bearing Lilies (marble, c. 1748), balustrade, Chapel of S Luigi Gonzaga, S. Ignazio, Rome.
- Two Putti (marble, c. 1748), flanking sarcophagus, Chapel of St Louis Gonzaga, S. Ignazio, Rome (attributed).
- Monument of Maria Rospigliosi Salviati (white & coloured marbles, 1749), Colonna Chapel, Santi Apostoli, Rome.
- The Evangelist Matthew (terracotta, no date), Inv.-Nr.9/87, Staatliche Museen zu Berlin.
- Tomb of Don Porfirio Antonini, S. Giovanni in Ayno, Rome (no longer used as a church, tomb has disappeared).

== Bibliography ==
- Sergei Androsov, "Two Unknown Works of Bernardino Ludovisi", paper presented at the Vladimir F. Levinson-Lessing Memorial Conference, State Hermitage Museum, Saint Petersburg, 23 October 2002, afternoon session.
- Robert Enggass, “Bernardino Ludovisi – I: the Early Work” The Burlington Magazine. CX (1968): 436, 438–444.
- Robert Enggass, “Bernardino Ludovisi – II: the Later Work” The Burlington Magazine. CX (1968): 494–501.
- Robert Enggass, “Bernardino Ludovisi – III: His Work in Portugal” The Burlington Magazine. CX (1968): 613–619.
- Robert Enggass, “Bernardino Ludovisi: a New Attribution” The Burlington Magazine. CXX (1978): 229–231.
- Robert Enggass, “Ludovisi’s Tomb for a Colonna Prince” The Burlington Magazine. CXXXV (1993): 822–824.
- Vernon Hyde Minor, “A Portrait of Benedict XIV by Bernardino Ludovisi,” Antologia di Belle Arti, nn. 59-62 (2000): 52–55.
- Rudolf Wittkower, Art and Architecture in Italy 1600-1750 (Pelican History of Art). Harmondsworth: Penguin, 1980.
