= Paolo Orsini (condottiero, born 1369) =

Italian condottiero (1369–1416)

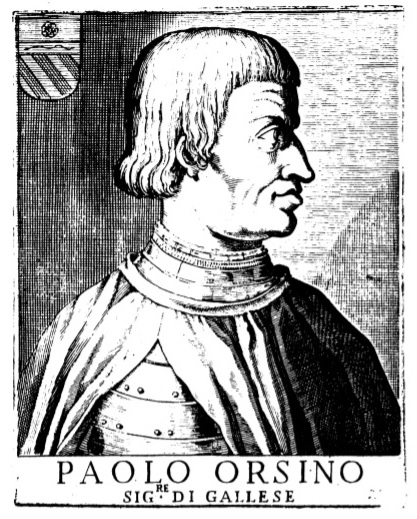
Posthumous portrait of Orsini from Giulio Roscio et al., Ritratti et elogii di capitani illvstri, Roma, 1646

Paolo Orsini (1369 – 5 August 1416) was an Italian condottiero and lord of Canino, Fiano Romano, Gallese, Olevano Romano, Orvieto, Marta, Montalto di Castro, Narni and Tuscania. He belonged to the Orsini family. He married Rita Sanguigni and with her had two children, Giampaolo and Calvinia, on whom little evidence survives. He also had an illegitimate son Francesco who also became a condottiero.

== Life ==
The son of Francesco Orsini, he distinguished himself as a soldier and diplomat from his youth onwards. In the struggles between Ladislaus of Naples and Pope Innocent VII, he re-established the pope's authority over Rome in 1406 and the following year defended Innocent against Ladislaus' allies in the Colonna family and was made Captain General of the Church. During Innocent's time away from Rome, Paolo sided with Louis II of Anjou against a new assault by Ladislaus, managing to defeat him in the 1411 battle of Roccasecca. Whilst en route to the battle of Sant'Egidio against Braccio da Montone, Paolo was treacherously killed by his enemies Angelo Tartaglia, Cristoforo da Lavello and Ludovico Colonna at Colfiorito and his army overwhelmed by Braccio's force. A later anonymous sonnet on him stated

He, who tamed the King, conquered the Fatherland,
Full of valour, ingenuity and power
Cruel Braccio, with another arm, extinguished.
