= Marcantonio Colonna =

Roman aristocrat

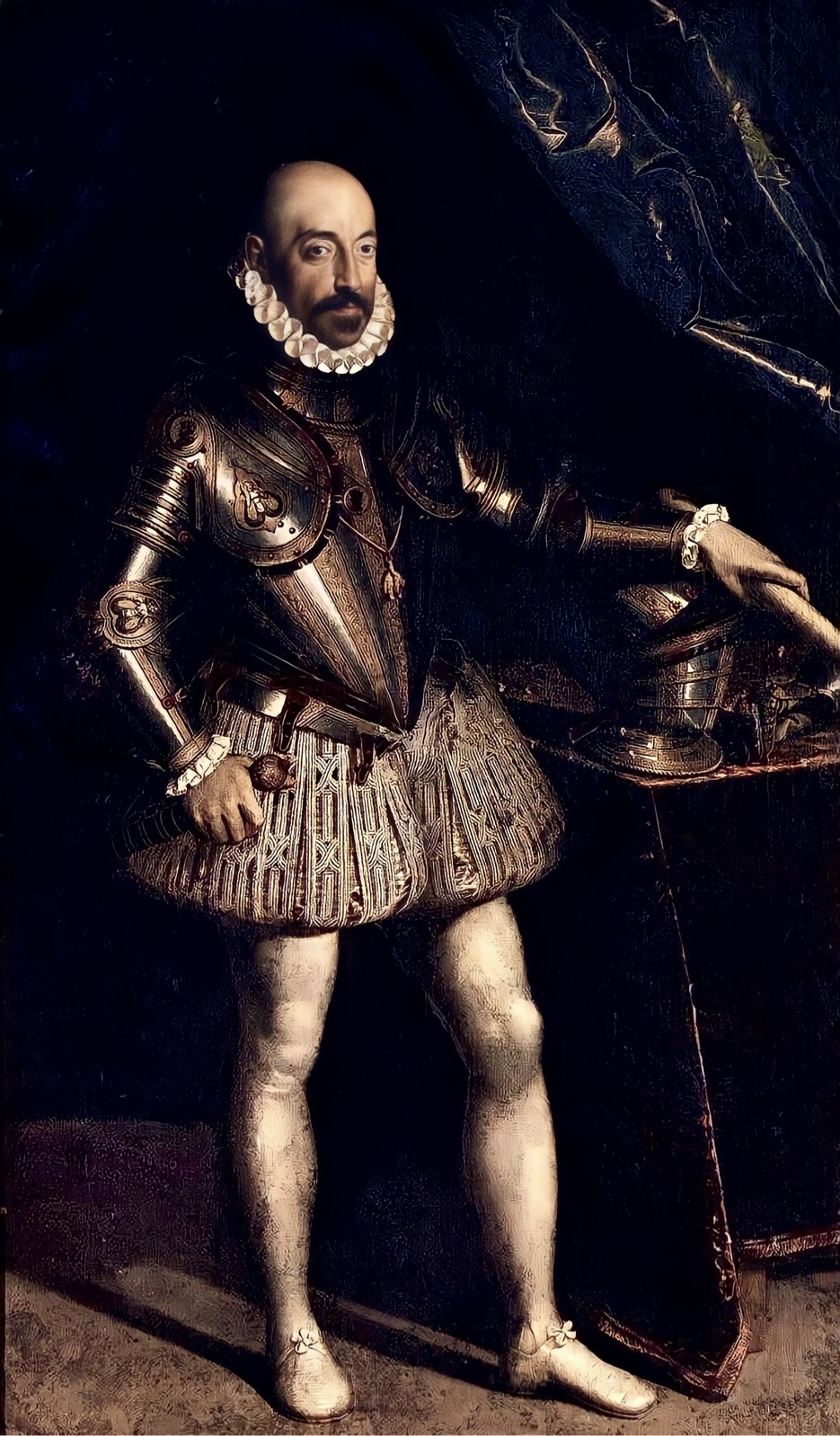
- Marcantonio II Colonna, Prince and Duke of Paliano and Tagliacozzo, portrayed by Scipione Pulzone
- Born: Marcantonio Colonna; 1535; Civita Lavinia (modern-day Lanuvio), Papal States
- Died: 1 August 1584 (aged 48–49); Medina Sidonia
- Burial place: Santa Maria sopra Minerva
- Title: Captain General of the Church; Viceroy of Sicily; Duke and Prince of Paliano; Duke of Tagliacozzo
- Spouse: Felicia Orsini
- Parents: Ascanio I Colonna (father); Giovanna d'Aragona (mother)

Marcantonio II Colonna (sometimes spelled Marc'Antonio; 1535 – 1 August 1584), Duke and Prince of Paliano and Duke of Tagliacozzo, was an Italian aristocrat and military commander who served as Viceroy of Sicily under the Spanish Crown, general of the Spanish armies, condestable of Naples and Captain General of the Church.

Colonna started his career in Italian armies of Spain during the last Italian War, becoming a feudal lord in Naples. He became admiral of the Papal Navy and served as lieutenant to John of Austria in the Holy League, playing a vital role in maintaining political cohesion among its members. He distinguished himself at the Battle of Lepanto, after which he drove off the rebuilt Ottoman fleet in the Cerigo Channel. In his final years, he served as Viceroy of Sicily. For his successes, he was described as "one of the most illustrious land and sea captains of the 16th century."

== Birth and early life ==
Marcantonio Colonna, born in 1535 at Civita Lavinia, was a member of the noble Colonna family of the Lazio, then one of the most powerful feudal dynasties of the Papal States and the Kingdom of Sicily, which was under Spanish rule.

He was the son of Ascanio Colonna and the adoptive cousin of Alfonso d'Ávalos, both renowned for their service to Holy Roman Emperor Charles V. His mother, Giovanna d'Aragona, niece of the late King Ferdinand I of Naples, divorced Ascanio and took Marcantonio with her when he was just one year old, meaning the young Colonna grew up essentially as a political enemy of his father. In 1548, he was summoned to serve as a page to Prince Philip, and in May 1552, he married Felicia Orsini as part of a potential reconciliation between his parents. However, the reconciliation failed, and Marcantonio was ultimately disinherited by his father that December.

== Italian Wars ==
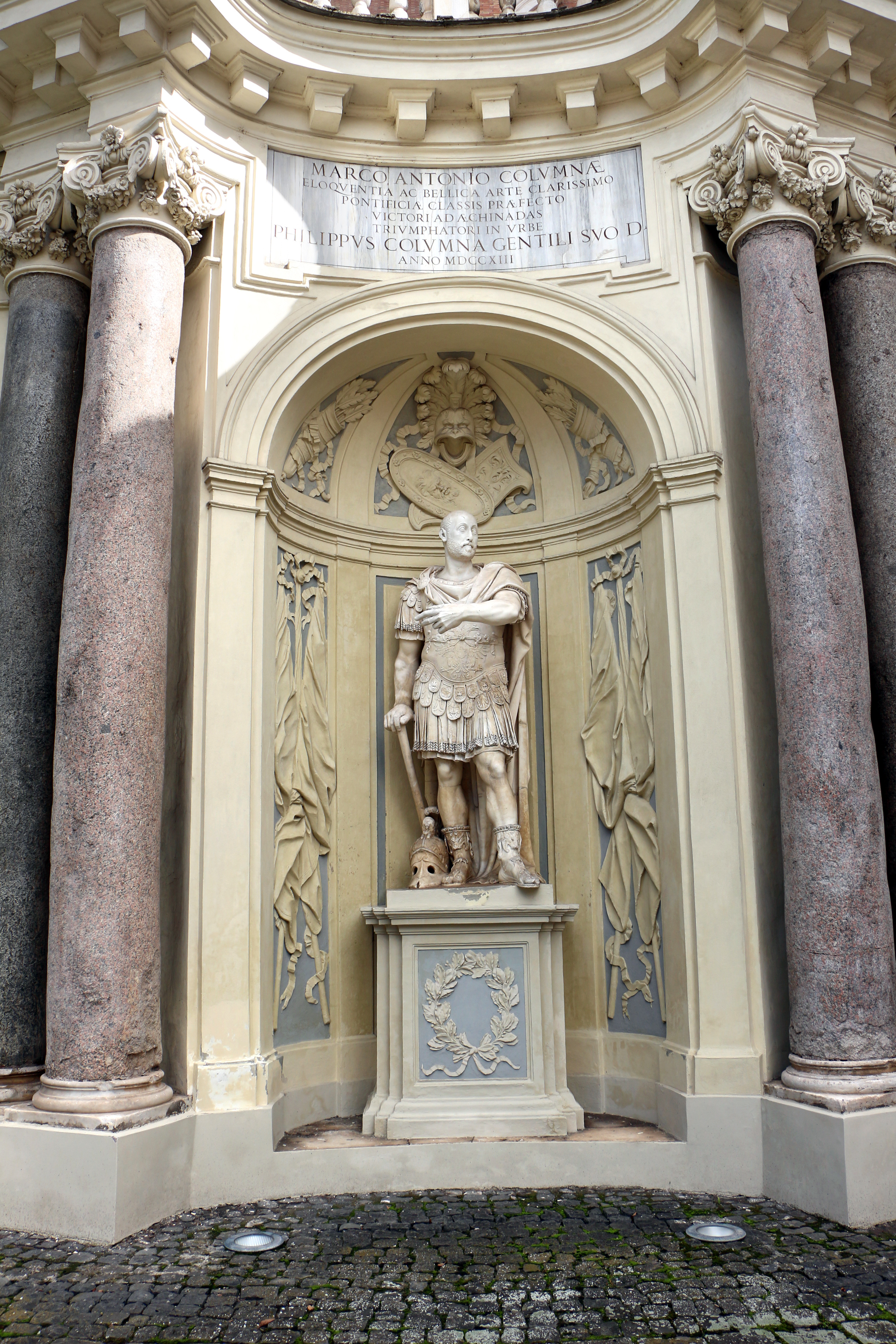
Statue of Colonna by Niccolò Pippi (Palazzo Colonna, Rome)

In 1553, upon reaching the age for military service in the Spanish army, Emperor Charles assigned him to the retinue of Fernando Álvarez de Toledo y Pimentel, duke of Alba, under whom he served on the Montalcino theater. Following that campaign, he used Spanish military force to seize his father's lands, exiling Ascanio to the Abruzzo region, where the latter was subsequently arrested by the viceroy on suspicion of treason. The following year, he was moved to the troops of Cosimo I de' Medici, a Spanish ally, and participated in the campaign to wrest Siena from French control. In August, he played a pivotal role in the cavalry during the Battle of Marciano under the command of Gian Giacomo Medici a conflict that resulted in the destruction of the Franco-Sienese army. A few months later, his father lodged a complaint against him with Pope Julius III, though nothing came of it.

By 1555, Colonna was a cavalry officer in the tercios of Naples and acquired his father's estates of Tagliacozzo and Paliano thanks to the intercession of Prince Philip. Upon the election of the new, pro-French pope Paul IV, Colonna traveled to Rome to organize a rebellion against the pontiff with the help of certain cardinals, but the plot failed when Paul discovered it and ordered his arrest. Colonna escaped to Paliano, although his mother, his wife, and Cardinal Guido Sforza were all placed under house arrest. Realizing the stronghold was ill-defended against papal troops, Colonna returned to the Viceroyalty of Naples and reunited with his imprisoned father, though relations between them stayed strained. At the end of the year, Giovanna and Felicia managed to escape and reunite with him in Naples, provoking the wrath of the pontiff, who excommunicated him in May 1556 and confiscated his lands for his own nephew, Giovanni Caraffa.

The resumption of hostilities in July allowed Colonna to exact his revenge. He accompanied the Duke of Alba on the march against the Papal States, personally capturing Paliano, Palestrina and Terracina, while also helping to incite his lands to revolt against the Pope and assisting in the capture of Ostia. In 1557, he defeated Giulio Orsini in a major battle at Acuto, and soon after achieved a victory at Valmontone by outmaneuvering French commander Francis of Guise. Colonna had Segni sacked, beating Orsini again and capturing him, and Alba ordered him to march on Rome for a surprise assault, though the plan was aborted after being discovered. Guise made no attempt to attack Alba's defenses, and following the French defeat at St. Quentin in 1557, he was forced to make an urgent return to France, leaving Alba and Colonna to secure the Pope's surrender. Colonna made a triumphal entry into Rome, where Paul IV died shortly thereafter amidst mobs that mutilated his statue, and saw the pontiff replaced by Pius IV.

With the backing of the now-King Philip II, the Colonna family regained their domains, though not Paliano, the recovery of which required extensive negotiations with Pius. Marco Antonio finally achieved a lukewarm reconciliation with his father, who acknowledged his inheritance rights before dying shortly after. He was further honored with the Order of the Golden Fleece, the Order of the Golden Spur, and the title of Grand Constable of Naples; in 1559, Pius lifted his excommunication too. Three years later, Paliano was handed over, completing the family's holdings. However, despite the Pope's support for the Colonna family, the costs of the war had been immense, and they were forced to sell several towns, such as Nemi, Ardea, and Civita Lavinia, due his father having left little money.

== Interwar period ==
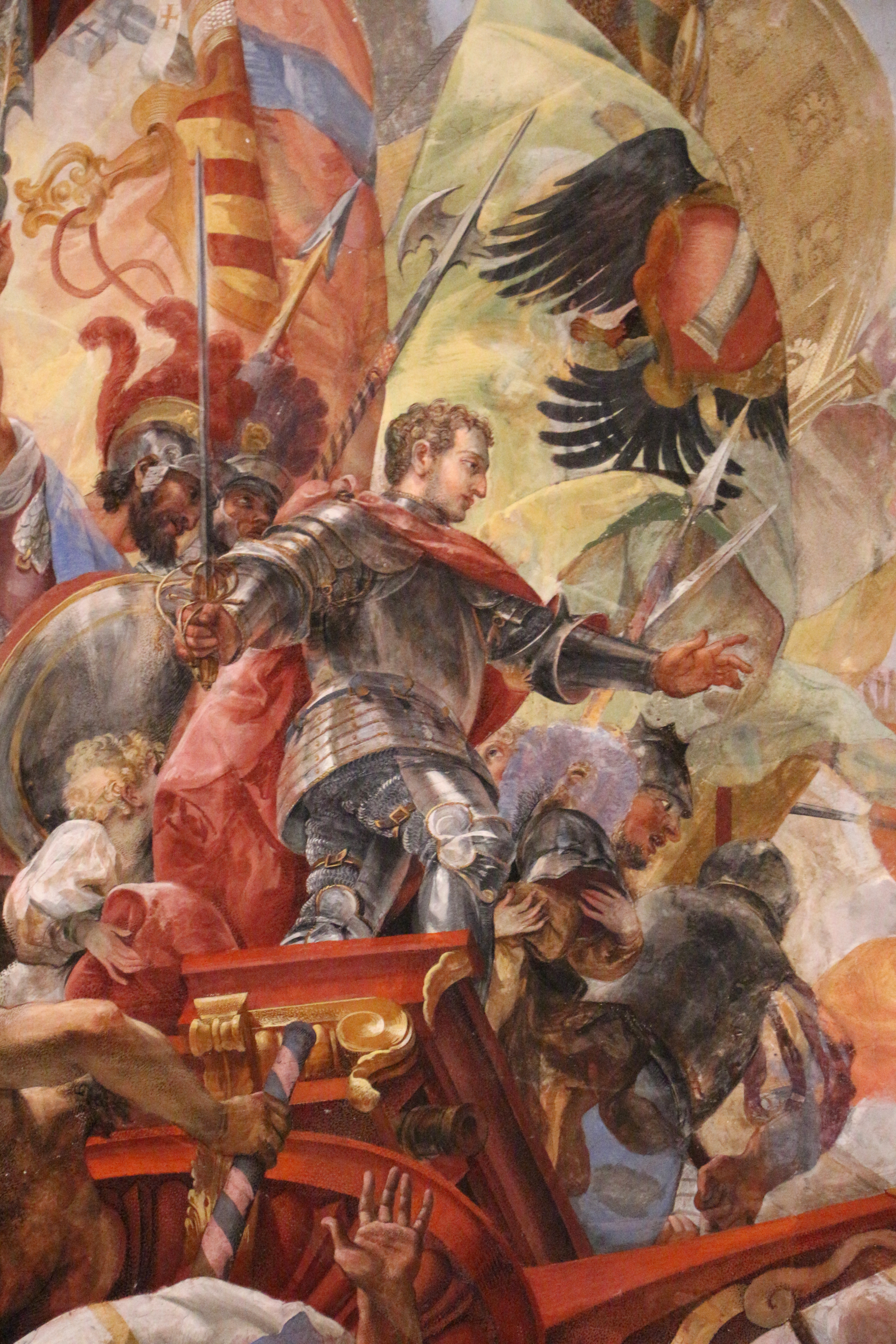
Marcantonio at the Colonna gallery, by Giovanni Coli and Filippo Gherardi

Colonna spent the following years moving between the Spanish court and Italian politics, where his power steadily grew, although his alliance with the Duke of Alba weakened due to the latter's rapprochement with the Carafa family, a shift that drove the Colonnas to align themselves with Ruy Gómez de Silva, Prince of Éboli and Alba's rival in Spain. Furthermore, he would henceforth work alongside the Popes to achieve religious unity in Italy, and ideally across the rest of Europe, in opposition to the Ottoman Empire.

Having acquired a squad of seven galleys from the Borromeo family, in 1564 he lent three of them for the conquest of Vélez de la Gomera by García de Toledo, a campaign also supported by the Genoese Giovanni Andrea Doria, a local political rival of Colonna. Colonna did not participate in the campaign itself, and his galleys were commanded by his captain Giorgio Grimaldi, though Colonna boarded them for the return voyage to Spain. Some sources claim that the following year he fought in the Great Siege of Malta against the Turks, but this is likely a case of mistaken identity involving his cousin Pompeo Colonna, Duke of Zagarolo, who served as his lieutenant in the papal forces and did indeed sit on the Spanish council during the siege.

In 1565 he expanded his castle in Avezzano by adding a new floor. He also had a fountain built as well as creating a loggia by the Fucine Lake. The castle was later converted into a fortified palace with a moat and drawbridge.

In 1567, Pius VI considered sending Colonna to support the Catholics during the French Wars of Religion, but the plan was never realized due to the Ottoman threat; instead, Colonna reorganized the papal army for him. In 1569, he traveled to Spain, proposing to be sent as reinforcements against the Dutch Revolt, ideally as governor of Milan so as to maintain the "Spanish Road". His proposal was not accepted, and he subsequently spent a period of time ill. In March 1570, despite holding the office of Grand Constable of Naples, a position that entailed obligations to Philip II, Colonna participated without royal authorization at the ceremony where Pope Pius V invested Cosimo I de' Medici as Grand Duke. This infuriated Philip, who disapproved of Colonna’s presence at an event he viewed as ecclesiastical interference contrary to Spain's interests. The presence of Paolo Orsini, a member of a traditionally pro-French family, even led the king to suspect that Colonna was involved in a conspiracy against him.

Colonna maintained very close ties with the papacy. In the summer of 1570, Pius appointed him Captain General of the papal fleet, yet another controversial decision, as Colonna once again accepted the post without consulting Philip. Ironically, it is believed that the Pope chose him as a gesture of goodwill toward Philip; although Colonna had owned galleys and was the most prestigious military figure in Rome, he had no direct naval experience. His role would be significant and demanding of strong leadership, given that the Pope had not possessed a fleet of his own since the papal navy was wiped out at the Battle of Djerba in 1560. Venice had promised to provide a flotilla of twelve galleys to the Pope in exchange for forming a league against the Ottomans, so Colonna was sent to take command. However, he found only eight, forcing him to travel to Venice to demand the rest. Furthermore, he had to have them completely refitted, as the galleys were of poor quality and carried very little artillery.

== Turkish-Ottoman War ==
=== Cyprus ===
Statue of Colonna in the Palazzo dei Conservatori, Rome

On June 11, 1570, he was chosen to lead an initial alliance against the Ottomans. The decision was debated in Spain, as Colonna had no naval experience beyond a single expedition against Turkish corsairs, and Philip II suspected that the league's true objective was to drive the Spanish out of Italy. Ultimately, the monarch gave his approval after being persuaded to join by Juan de Zúñiga, and he sent Giovanni Andrea Doria with a Spanish-Genoese fleet to reinforce Colonna, subject to certain conditions. A similar situation unfolded in the Venetian Senate, who had wanted a Venetian commander for the league, although they too reluctantly accepted the appointment. Colonna seized the opportunity to visit Venice and attempt to improve relations with the Republic, whether out of shared interest or personal ambition.

Colonna’s participation in the first campaign, aimed at relieving the siege of Nicosia, began under promising auspices. The Venetians even assigned him as his flagship the quinquereme built by Vettore Fausto as the very first galleass. Upon rendezvousing with Doria and the Venetian Girolamo Zane in Candia, it was agreed that Colonna would lead the League while deferring to Doria, who possessed the most maritime experience of the three, yet this arrangement failed to resolve the inevitable disagreements. Colonna, supported by Zane and the Spanish captain Álvaro de Bazán, advocated for attacking the Turkish fleet while it was still scattered along the coast of Cyprus, arguing that there was still time for operations before the onset of autumn weather. Doria, however, opposed this course of action, citing the wretched condition of the Venetian galleys and crews and fearing the storms. By the time they reached Cyprus, they learned that Nicosia had already fallen.

Disagreements intensified to the point where the Spaniards wished to withdraw from the campaign, and Colonna and Zane had to press them to stay. Colonna clashed openly with Doria, and Carlo d'Avalos of the Spanish fleet nearly came to blows with the Roman. Ultimately, the fleets decided to return to Candia, where the alliance completely disintegrated, and the campaign ended with the coalition forces returning empty-handed. To make matters worse, Colonna encountered a storm between Corfu and Ancona that sank the greater part of the papal flotilla, leaving him to return home with only four galleys. This time, Philip absolved Colonna of blame for the fiasco and attempted to mediate between him and Doria, who by then were accusing each other of incompetence. The Pope also sided with Colonna. For his part, Doria came to fear that Colonna and Bazán would form a political front against him.

=== Lepanto ===
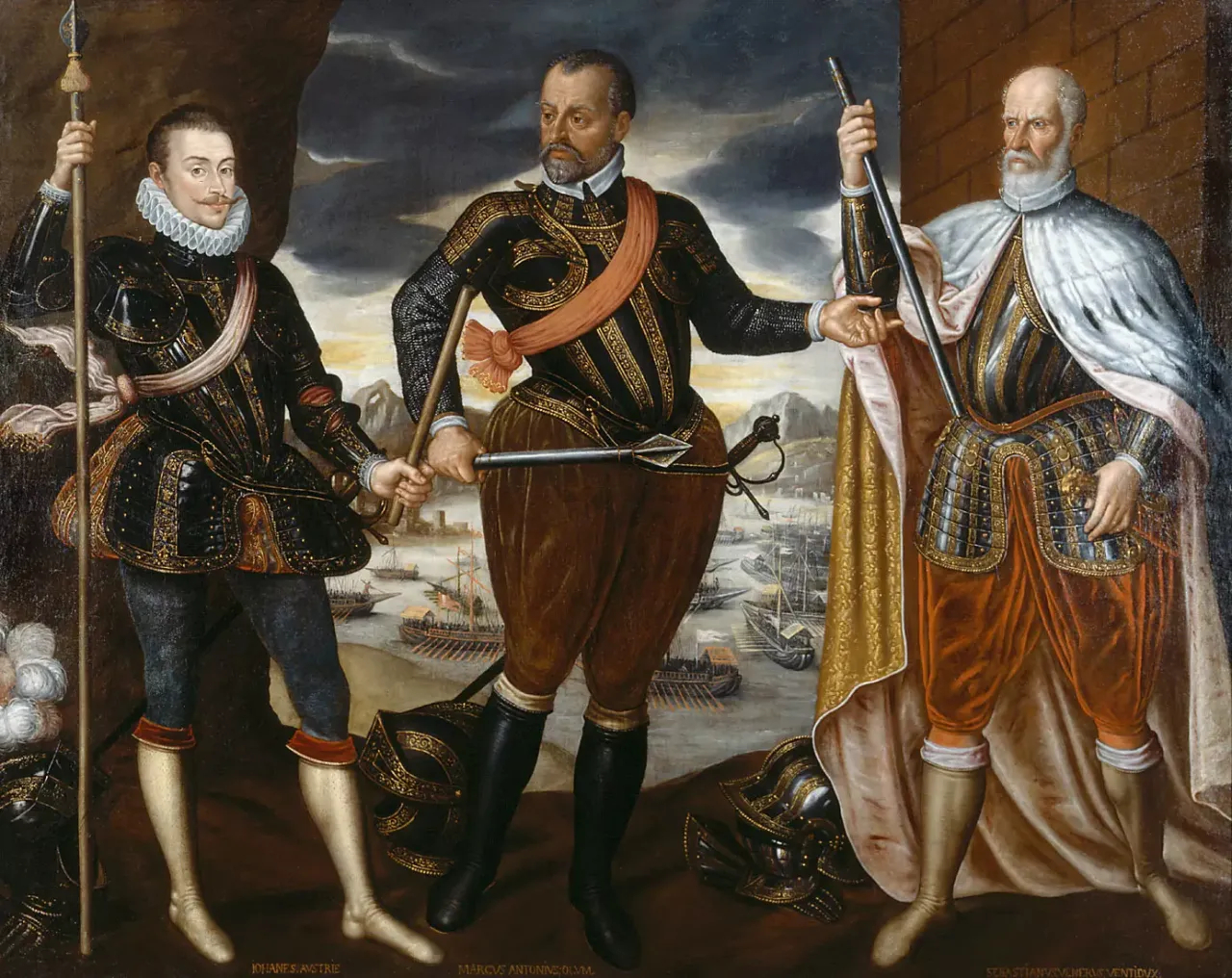
The Victors of Lepanto (from left: John of Austria, Marcantonio Colonna, Sebastiano Venier)

Inscription recording Colonna's victory at Lepanto and his subsequent Roman triumph (Rome, Palazzo dei Conservatori, 1591)

In early 1571, with the alliance in disarray, Pope Pius V sent Colonna to Venice as soon as he learned that the Venetians were making every effort to conclude a peace treaty with the Ottoman Empire. Leveraging his existing good relations with the Venetians, Colonna conveyed the Pope's willingness to concede to several of their demands provided they ceased negotiations with the Turks and committed loyally to the cause of Christendom, and succeeded in securing their agreement. The Holy League was officially signed shortly thereafter, on May 25. Pius had once again wanted Colonna to serve as supreme commander, but following extensive negotiations with Spain, he agreed to the appointment of the Spanish candidate, John of Austria, with Colonna serving as his lieutenant and deputy.

In August of that same year, joined by his cousin Pompeo, Colonna assembled his fleet at Messina alongside those of Don John and the Venetian Sebastiano Venier, in preparation for the upcoming campaign. His diplomatic skills were once again evident, as he persuaded the Venetians to agree to embark Spanish marine infantry onto their galleys, which were otherwise poorly equipped and undermanned. He also helped resolve another incident between the Spanish and the Venetians—the execution of four Spaniards by the Venetian commander Sebastiano Venier, which had infuriated John of Austria’s inner circle to the point of nearly fracturing the League.

During the ensuing Battle of Lepanto on October 7, 1571, Colonna served with distinction.He commanded the papal Capitana (flagship) as part of the Centre division, where he rescued the Real, flagship of commander Don John of Austria. When the Real was almost taken by the Ottoman janissaries, Colonna came alongside, with the bow of his galley and mounted a counter-attack. With the help of Colonna, the Turks were pushed off the Real and the Ottoman flagship of Ali Pasha was boarded and swept. The entire crew of Ali Pasha's flagship was killed, including the commander himself. The banner of the Holy League was hoisted on the captured ship, breaking the morale of the Turkish galleys nearby.

Right after, when Ottoman admiral Occhiali broke through the gap between the Christian right wing and the center, where Colonna was positioned, the Roman fought to prevent the Turkish penetration from splitting the Christian fleet in two, holding the line until Bazán and Juan de Cardona arrived from the reserve to close the breach. In the process, Colonna was shot twice in the chest and suffered a damaged hand, although he survived the engagement and was subsequently praised by Don John of Austria for his efforts.

On his return to Rome to announce the victory, a ceremony modeled on ancient Roman triumphs was held, featuring chariots, parades, and chained captives. Among the captives was Said Bey, the surviving son of Ali Pasha, whom Colonna handed over to Pius V to be released soon after. However, out of deference to John of Austria as the League's commander-in-chief, Colonna marched without wearing his full armor. Even so, the procession involved over 5,000 participants and was at event of the time.

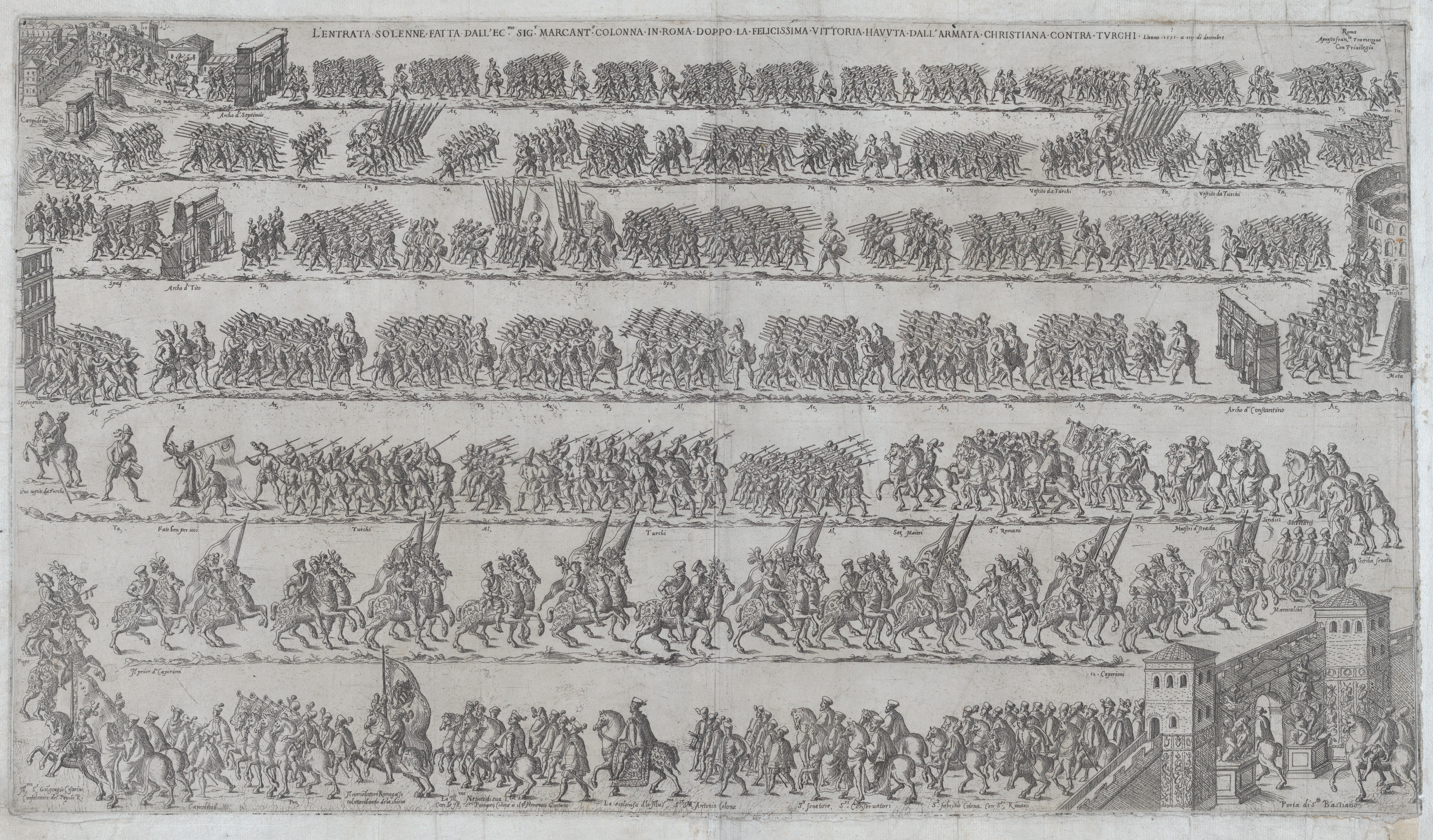
Entry of Marcantonio Colonna to Rome, 1571. Etching by Francesco Tramezzino.

=== Cerigo and Navarino ===
The following year, the new pope, Gregory XIII, confirmed him as Captain General of the Church.. In June, albeit with a reduced force, Colonna sailed with part of the squadrons to Messina, where forces were once again gathering for a planned campaign against the Turkish coast. However, en route, he clashed with Álvaro de Bazán over command, and upon arrival, he discovered that John of Austria’s main fleet would be delayed due to other strategic priorities for Spain, such as the threat posed by the Franco-Ottoman alliance. Colonna wrote to Philip II to plead his case, offering support for a potential war against France, and succeeded in securing permission for Don John to advance him 22 galleys under the command of Cardona and Gil de Andrade. Colonna thus set sail for Corfu with these ships, serving as acting general.

When the surviving Ottoman admiral, Occhiali, put to sea in June with 200 galleys, Colonna took command of the League fleet and moved to Morea to block his path to Venice. The two fleets met in a skirmish at Cerigo Channel, where Colonna deployed his 139 galleys with his six galleasses and twenty galleons and carracks positioned ahead of them, but Occhiali declined to fight despite his bigger numbers, being now wary of their heavy artillery. The Christians sought battle for three days, but Occhiali ultimately fled. The second encounter of the skirmish took place days later off Cape Matapan, where Uluj retreated with his left flank battered. Once clear of the Turks, Colonna pressed to rendezvous with John of Austria and Bazán before the Ottomans could ambush their much smaller fleet. Once reunited, John of Austria reprimanded them for having engaged Occhiali under dangerous conditions, so Colonna and Andrade offered their resignations, but Don John refused to accept them.

Before undertaking the siege of Navarino, Colonna once again mediated between the Spanish and the Venetians. The Venetian Giacomo Foscarini flatly refused to embark Spanish soldiers; Colonna managed to embark Papal troops instead and then replaced them with Spanish soldiers on his own ships. However, the siege resulted in no gains for the League other than the death of Mahomet Bey, grandson of Hayreddin Barbarossa, and the campaign had to be abandoned. Colonna was well received by the Gregory and subsequently traveled to Spain to discuss the next campaign with Philip II. The King agreed to send another fleet, despite the friction between Colonna and the Spanish-Genoese captains, and promised to grant him administrative posts in recognition of his service to date. However, the Holy League dissolved the following year due to Venice's pact with the Ottomans and Spain's escalating conflicts in Europe.

== Late career ==
In 1577, King Philip II appointed him Viceroy of Sicily. He also held the title of Lord of Marino, then a small village a few miles south of Rome, where the inhabitants honoured him with a grand annual celebration. The tradition survives today as the "Sagra dell'Uva". Later in life, he moved to L'Aquila, where he resided in the house now known as the Palazzo Porcinari. He died in 1584 in undisclosed circumstances.

In November 2022, the Italian Navy launched a multipurpose offshore patrol ship named in his honour, the Marcantonio Colonna.

== Family and issue ==
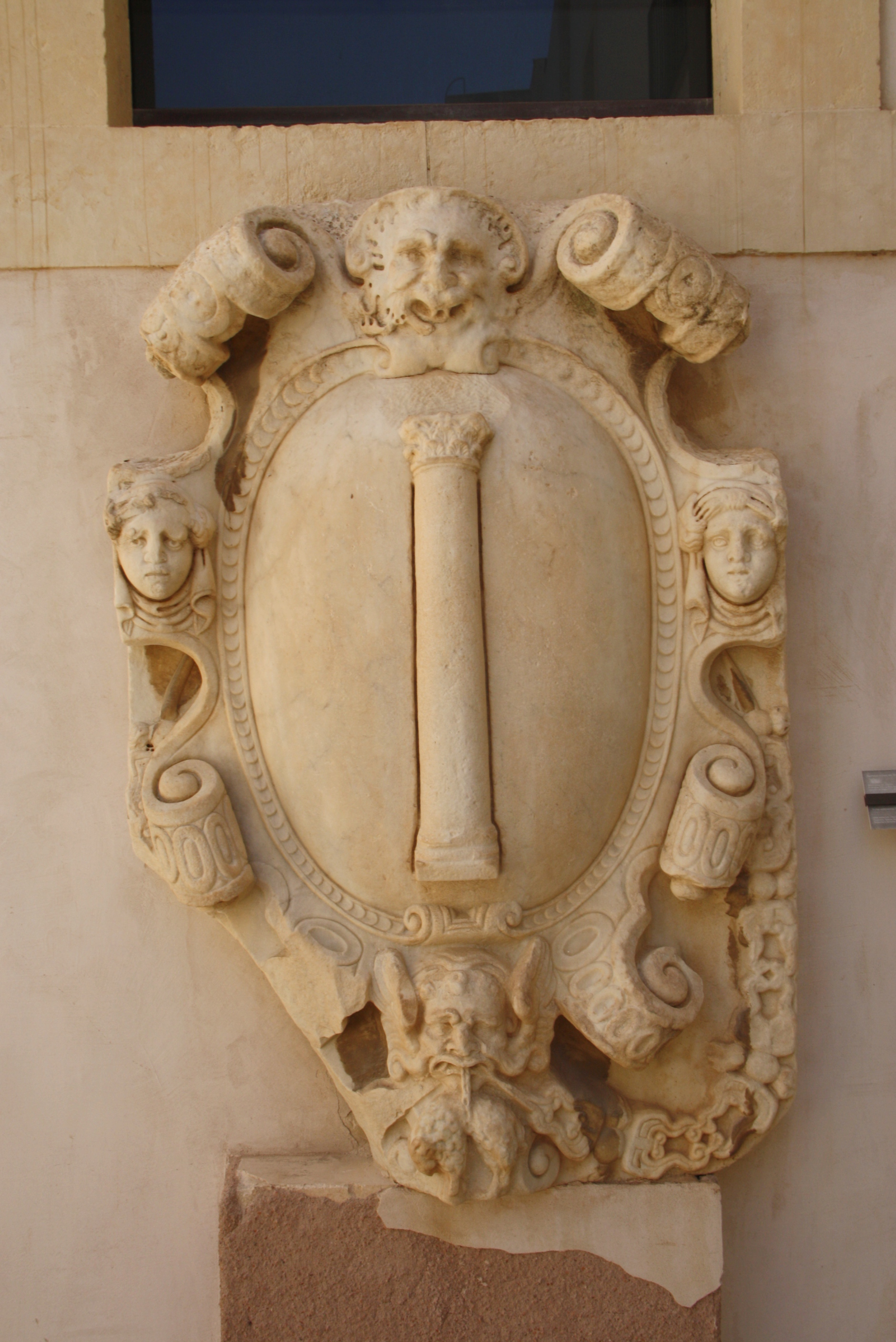
The Colonna coat of arms, from the Palazzo Bellomo in Syracuse

On 29 April 1552, at Rome, he married Felicia Orsini, daughter of Girolamo Orsini, Lord of Bracciano, and granddaughter of Gian Giordano Orsini and his second wife Felice della Rovere, natural daughter of Pope Julius II. Her mother was Francesca Sforza of Santa Fiora, daughter of Bosio II Sforza, XI Count of Santa Fiora, and his wife Costanza Farnese, natural daughter of Pope Paul III.

They had seven children, four sons and three daughters:

- Costanza Colonna (1555 – 1626). She married Francesco I Sforza di Caravaggio and was the first patroness of painter Michelangelo di Caravaggio.
- Fabrizio Colonna (1557 – 1 November 1580). Captain of Spanish army, on 4 December 1565 he married Anna Borromeo and was father of Marcantonio III Colonna and Filippo I Colonna. He died in Gibraltar.
- Vittoria Colonna (1558–1633). On 31 December 1597 she married Luis Enríquez de Cabrera y Mendoza, Spanish nobleman.
- Ascanio Colonna (1560–1608). Cardinal and viceroy of Aragon, I Duke of Marino.
- Prospero Colonna. Soldier in Spanish army.
- Federico Colonna. He died in infancy.
- Giovanna Colonna. In 1566 she married Antonio Carafa, prince of Stignano.

== Bibliography ==
- Anderson, Roger Charles (1952). Naval wars in the Levant, 1559-1853. Princeton University Press.
- Capponi, Niccolo (2012). Lepanto 1571. La Lega santa contro l'Impero ottomano. Saggiatore. ISBN 978-88-565-0202-2.
- Fernández Duro, Cesáreo (1896). Armada Española, desde la unión de los reinos de Castilla y Aragón, tomo II. Madrid: Instituto de Historia Naval.
- Rosell, Cayetano (1853). Historia del combate naval de Lepanto. Real Academia de la Historia.
- Sánchez, Miguel (1868). Felipe II y la Liga de 1571 contra el Turco. Indicador de los Caminos de Hierro.

Government offices
Preceded by Carlo d'Aragona Tagliavia	Viceroy of Sicily; 1577–1584	Succeeded by Juan Alfonso Bisbal
