= Sesto =

Sesto may refer to:

== People ==
=== Surname ===
- Camilo Sesto (1946–2019), Spanish singer
- Cesare da Sesto, (1477–1523) Italian painter
- Count Sesto, an Italian noble title

=== Given name ===
- Sesto Bruscantini (1919–2003), Italian opera singer
- Sesto Pals (c. 1912–2008), Romanian writer
- Sesto Prete (1919–1991), Italian-American philologist
- Sesto Rocchi (1909–1991), Italian luthier

== Places ==
- Sesto al Reghena, Pordenone, Italy
- Sesto Calende, Varese, Italy
- Sesto Campano, Isernia, Italy
- Sesto ed Uniti, Cremona, Italy
- Sesto Fiorentino, Florence, Italy
- Sesto San Giovanni, Milano, Italy
- Sexten (Italian: Sesto), Bolzano, Italy

== See also ==
- Sestos, an ancient city in Turkey
- Sestu, an Italian municipality in the Province of Cagliari
