= Filippo Colonna, 9th Prince of Paliano =

Italian nobleman

Filippo II Colonna 9th Prince of Paliano
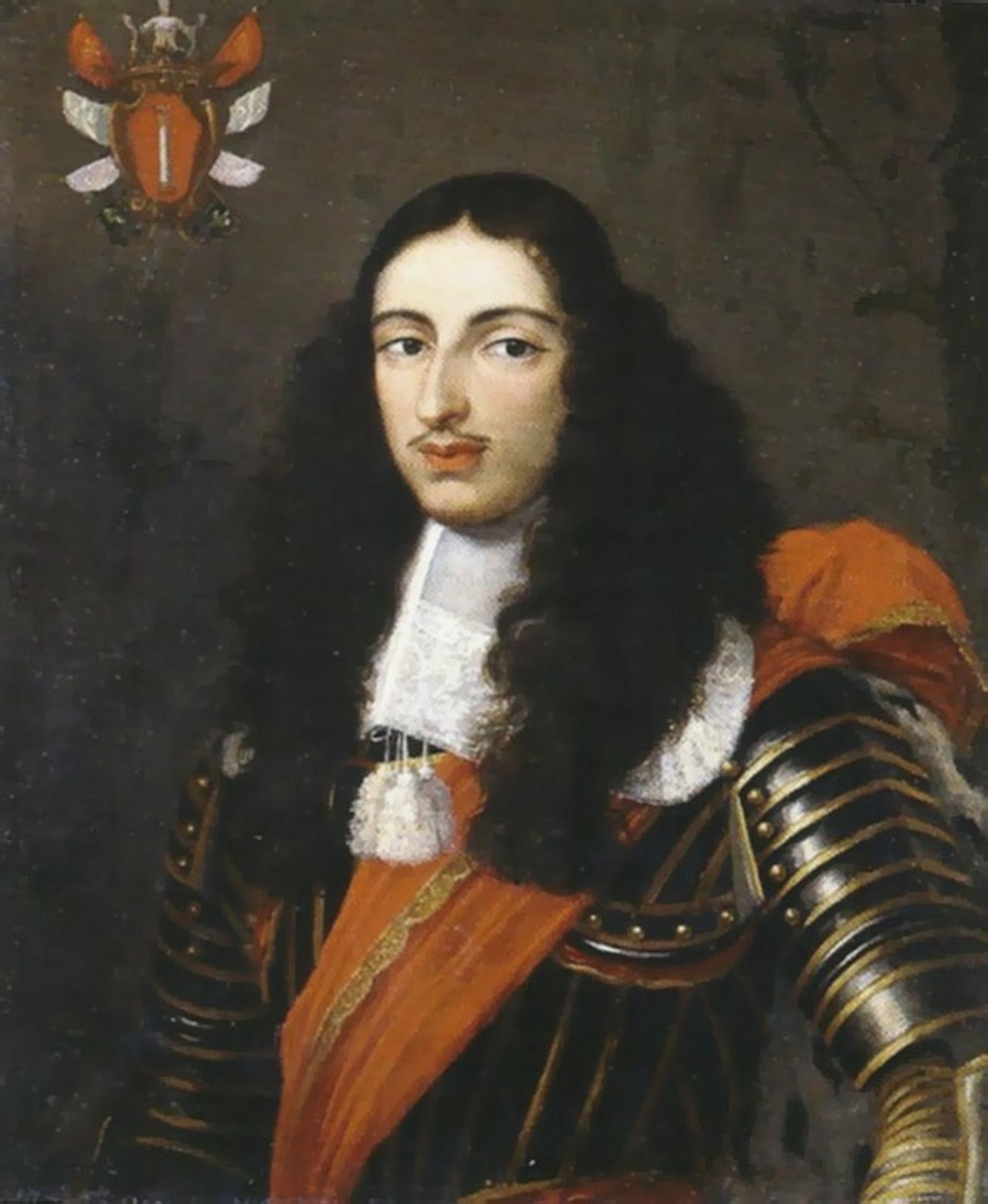
- Born: 4 April 1663; Rome
- Died: 8 November 1714 (aged 51); Rome
- Spouse(s): Lorenza de la Cerda (m. 1681; died 1697) Olimpia Pamphilj (m. 1697; died 1714)
- Parent(s): Lorenzo Onofrio Colonna; Maria Mancini
- Family: House of Colonna

Filippo II Colonna (7 April 1663 – 8 November 1714) was an Italian nobleman of prominent Colonna family. He was the 9th Duke and Prince of Paliano.

== Early life ==
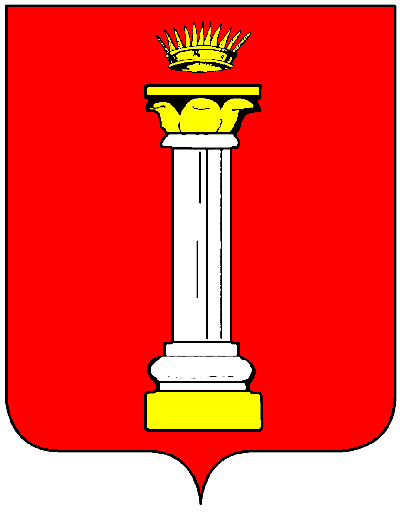
Crest of the Colonna family.

Born in Rome on 7 April 1663, Filippo was the son of Don Lorenzo Onofrio Colonna, hereditary Grand Constable of the Kingdom of Naples, and Maria Mancini, a niece of Cardinal Mazarin. The Spanish had ruled Naples since the early sixteenth century, and the Colonna were prominent servants of the Spanish crown in Italy.

== Career ==
In 1687, while his father served as head of the interregnum council of Naples, Filippo was appointed commander of a company of lancers. In 1689 he succeeded his father as Grand Constable and Duke-Prince of Paliano.

As a patron of the arts, Filippo had the art gallery in the family's Roman palazzo refurbished. He opened the gallery in 1703. The composer Giovanni Bononcini wrote six serenatas, an oratorio and five operas while in his service from 1692 to 1697. Filippo was a member of the Academy of Arcadia, which had been established in Rome in 1690.

Among his other titles, Filippo was Prince of Castiglione, and Duke of Marino, Miraglia and Tagliacozzo. He was made a knight of the Order of the Golden Fleece by Spanish king Carlos II in 1679. In 1710 he became the first Colonna to be appointed hereditary Prince Assistant to the Papal Throne.

== Personal life ==
Don Filippo married the Spanish aristocrat Lorenza de la Cerda in Madrid in 1681, but she died without issue in 1697. Later that year in Rome he wed his second wife, the Italian aristocrat Olimpia Pamphilj (1672–1731), by whom he had several children, including:

- Lorenzo Colonna (1698–1699), who died young.
- Fabrizio II Colonna (1700–1755), who married Caterina Zefirina Salviati, a daughter of Antonio Maria Salviati, 3rd Duke of Giuliano (a direct descendant of Jacopo Salviati) and Maria Lucrezia Rospigliosi (niece of Cardinal Felice Rospigliosi).
- Agnese Colonna (1702–1780), who married Camillo Borghese, 4th Prince of Sulmona.
- Clemente Colonna (b. 1704)
- Anna Colonna (1706–1745), who married Domenico Marzio IV Carafa, 8th Duke of Maddaloni.

The Prince suffered from painful bladder stones and diseased kidneys prior to his death at Rome in 1714. His son Fabrizio II succeeded him in his hereditary titles. Fabrizio also commissioned a tomb for his father in the church of Sant' Andrea in the family seat of Paliano, which was executed by the sculptor Bernardino Ludovisi and installed in 1745.

=== Descendants ===
Through his daughter Agnese, he was a grandfather of Marcantonio Borghese, 5th Prince of Sulmona.
