= Paolo Orsini =

Paolo Orsini may refer to:

- Paolo Orsini (condottiero, born 1369) (1369–1416), Italian condottiero
- Paolo Orsini (condottiero, born 1450) (1450–1503), Italian condottiero
- Paolo Giordano I Orsini (1541–1585), 1st Duke of Bracciano
- Paolo Giordano II Orsini (1591–1656), 3rd Duke of Bracciano, grandson of the above
