= Marcantonio Colonna, 7th Prince of Paliano =

Italian nobleman

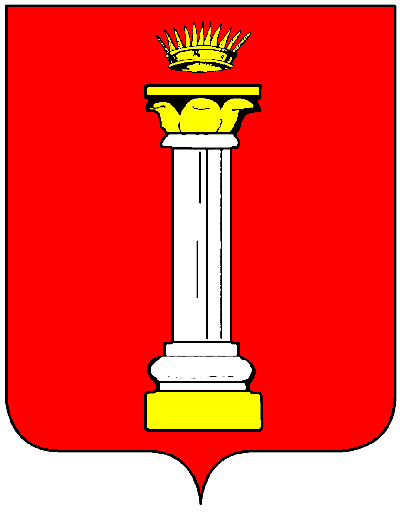
Crest of the Colonna family

Marcantonio Colonna, 7th Prince of Paliano (1606/10 – 1659) was an Italian nobleman of the Colonna family and 7th Prince of Paliano.

Colonna was the son of Don Filippo I Colonna, Prince of Paliano, and his wife, Lucrezia Tomacelli. He was the brother of Anna Colonna who married Taddeo Barberini (Prince of Palestrina) and Cardinal Girolamo Colonna.

Colonna married Isabella Gioeni Cardona, Princess of Castiglione and had issue including:

- Lorenzo Onofrio Colonna who married Maria Mancini (a niece of Cardinal Mazarin) and inherited Colonna's titles.
- Anna Colonna, who married Paolo Spinola, 3rd Marquis of the Balbases and had issue including Carlo Antonio Spinola.

When Colonna's father died, it was revealed he had appointed his Cardinal son, Girolamo, as heir instead of his eldest son Frederico. The decision started a significant succession conflict upon his death. In the interim, while his older brothers fought over control of the duchy, Marcantonio Colonna served as Prince of Paliano. When Frederico died in 1641, (without issue) and Girolamo died (also without issue as was always likely considering he was a Cardinal), Marcantonio Colonna's son succeeded him as Prince and assumed the title of Duke as well.
