= Francesco Tramezzino =

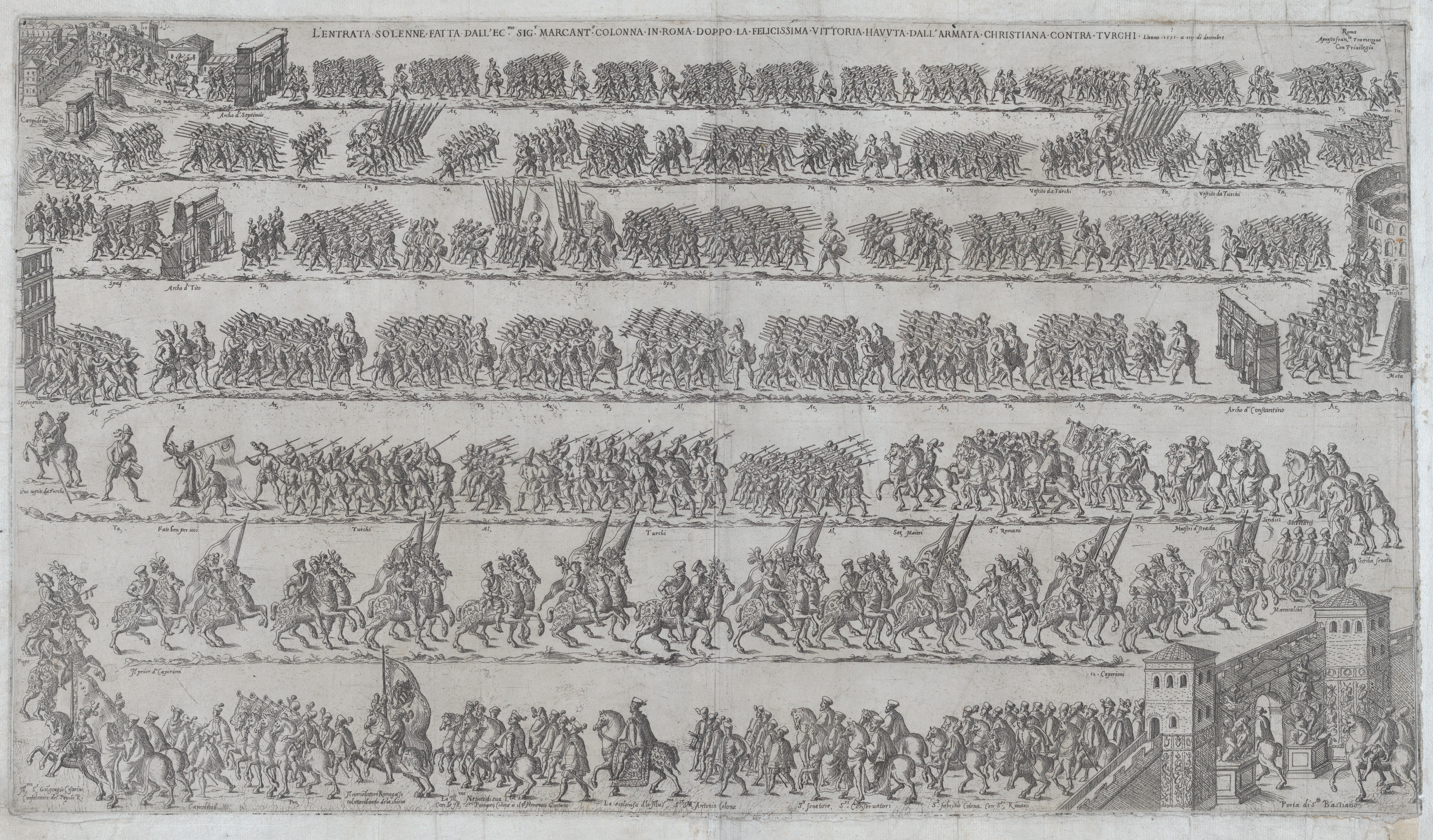
Tramezzino's etching

Francesco Tramezzino (or Franco Tramezzino) was an Italian engraver of the Renaissance, known for an etching representing the entry into the city of Rome of Marcantonio Colonna and his Christian army after the Battle of Lepanto, December 11, 1571. First noted in 1526, he worked in both Rome and Venice, and died in 1576.
