= Paliano =

- Comune
- Comune di Paliano
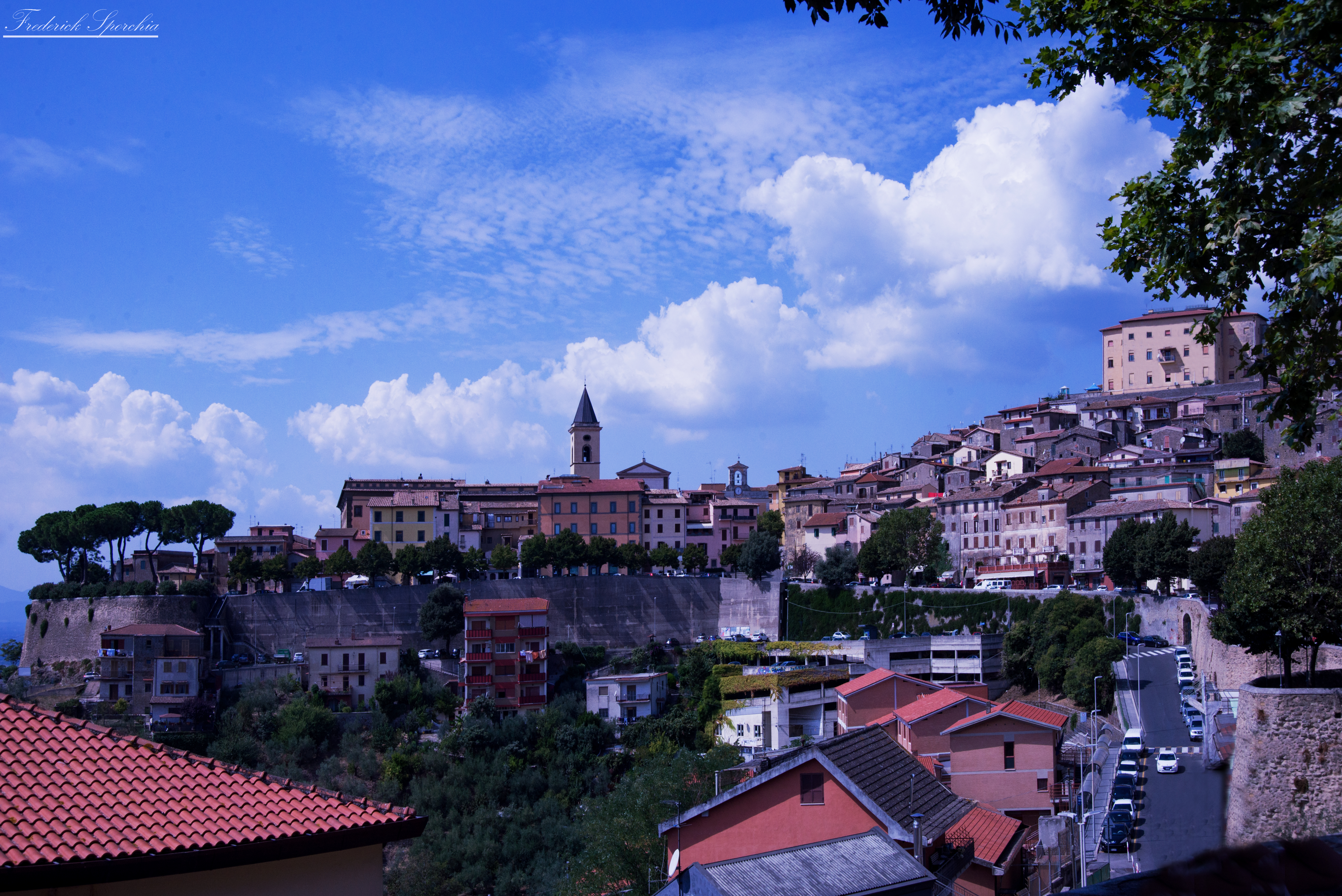

- Coat of arms

- Location within Italy Location within Lazio
- Coordinates: 41°48′N 13°03′E
- Country: Italy
- Region: Lazio
- Province: Frosinone (FR)
- Frazioni: Cappuccini, Castellaccio, Jo Colle, Martinaccio, Mole, Poggio Romano-Palianese sud, San Procolo-Cimate, Santa Maria Pugliano, Sant'Andrea, Sant'Anna, Terrignano

Government
  - Mayor: Domenico Alfieri

Area
  - Total: 70 km^{2} (27 sq mi)
- Elevation: 471 m (1,545 ft)

Population (30 June 2017)
  - Total: 8,190
  - Density: 120/km^{2} (300/sq mi)
- Demonym: Palianesi
- Time zone: UTC+1 (CET)
  - Summer (DST): UTC+2 (CEST)
- Postal code: 03018
- Dialing code: 0775
- Patron saint: St. Andrew
- Saint day: November 30
- Website: Official website

Paliano is a town and comune in the province of Frosinone, in the Lazio region of central Italy.

== History ==
Paliano was the seat of a branch of the powerful Colonna family whose head was Lord, then Duke, then Prince of Paliano. Their fortress dominates the town. In 1556 papal forces captured the town, which was governed for a few years by Giovanni Carafa, nephew of Pope Paul IV, as Duke. His wife, Violante di Cardona, was the Duchess of Paliano celebrated in Stendhal's novella of the same name.

Upon the death of Paul IV in 1559, Marcantonio Colonna regained the town. His participation in the naval battle of Lepanto in 1571 is commemorated by the Via Lepanto leading to the family palazzo. The 17th century church of Sant’ Andrea contains the tombs of the Colonna, including a magnificent tomb for Prince Filippo II Colonna by Bernardino Ludovisi, completed in 1745. In the 19th century the Colonna fortress was sold to the Papal States, which used it as a prison.
