= Margherita Colonna =

Blessed Margherita Colonna

Nun
- Born: c. 1255; Palestrina, Papal States
- Died: 30 December 1280 (aged 25); Castel San Pietro Romano, Rome, Papal States
- Venerated in: Roman Catholic Church
- Beatified: 17 September 1847, Saint Peter's Basilica, Papal States by Pope Pius IX
- Feast: 30 December
- Attributes: Poor Clares habit

Margherita Colonna, (c.1255 – 30 December 1280) was a member of the Colonna family, which was notable in Italian history for centuries.

She was beatified by Pope Pius IX after the approval of her cult in 1847.

== Life ==
She was born in Palestrina about 1255. Her father, Oddone Colonna, died when she was about two years old. Her mother, who was also named Margherita and who was the sister of Matteo Rosso Orsini and a pious woman, died when Margherita was probably a little over ten years old. Margherita was left in the care of her older brothers.

The elder, Giovanni Colonna, was repeatedly a Roman senator. The earliest biography about Margaret was written by him before 1285. The younger, Giacomo, was made a cardinal in 1278 by Pope Nicholas III, an Orsini cousin. Cardinal Colonna was a friend and confidant of Pope Honorius IV, and a leading figure of the papal curia.

In Margherita's late teens there was talk of an appropriate marriage for her, but it was not forced. According to the biography by her brother, Margaret had always lived in peculiarly sweet piety. She had long wanted to retire from the world. She was initially opposed by her brother Giovanni, but supported by her brother Giacomo.

She retired to Castel San Pietro, a lonely retreat near Palestrina where she passed her time in practices of piety and penance. Her charity towards the poor was said to be unbounded, and she was thought to have worked miracles.

Margherita's followers formed a loose community on the Monti Prenestini above Palestrina. Seven years before her death, she was afflicted with an ulcer, from which she suffered until her death. She died on December 30, 1280.

== Veneration ==
Margherita was, after her death, considered a saint by the people in the areas of Colonna power, in the stretch of territory from Subiaco to Palestrina and from Palestrina to Anagni. She was very much a family saint; and her sanctity had flowered, in life, on Colonna hills. The relics of Blessed Margherita are venerated in the church of Castel San Pietro, not far from Palestrina.

In 1285 Pope Honorius IV granted the monastery of San Silvestro in Capite to her followers, who at that time were incorporated into a formal Franciscan community, adopting the rule of the Sorores minores, which had been approved for Isabelle of France, the sister of Louis IX of France, in 1263. After the first biography written by her brother, a second was composed by a woman named Stefania, who had been a leader of the community stemming from Margherita's followers.

== Bibliography ==
- Visions of Sainthood in Medieval Rome: The Lives of Margherita Colonna by Giovanni Colonna and Stefania, translated by Larry Field, edited by Lezlie S. Knox and Sean L. Field (University of Notre Dame Press, 2017).
