= Filippo Colonna, 6th Prince of Paliano =

Italian nobleman (1578–1639)

Filippo Colonna
- 6th Prince of Paliano
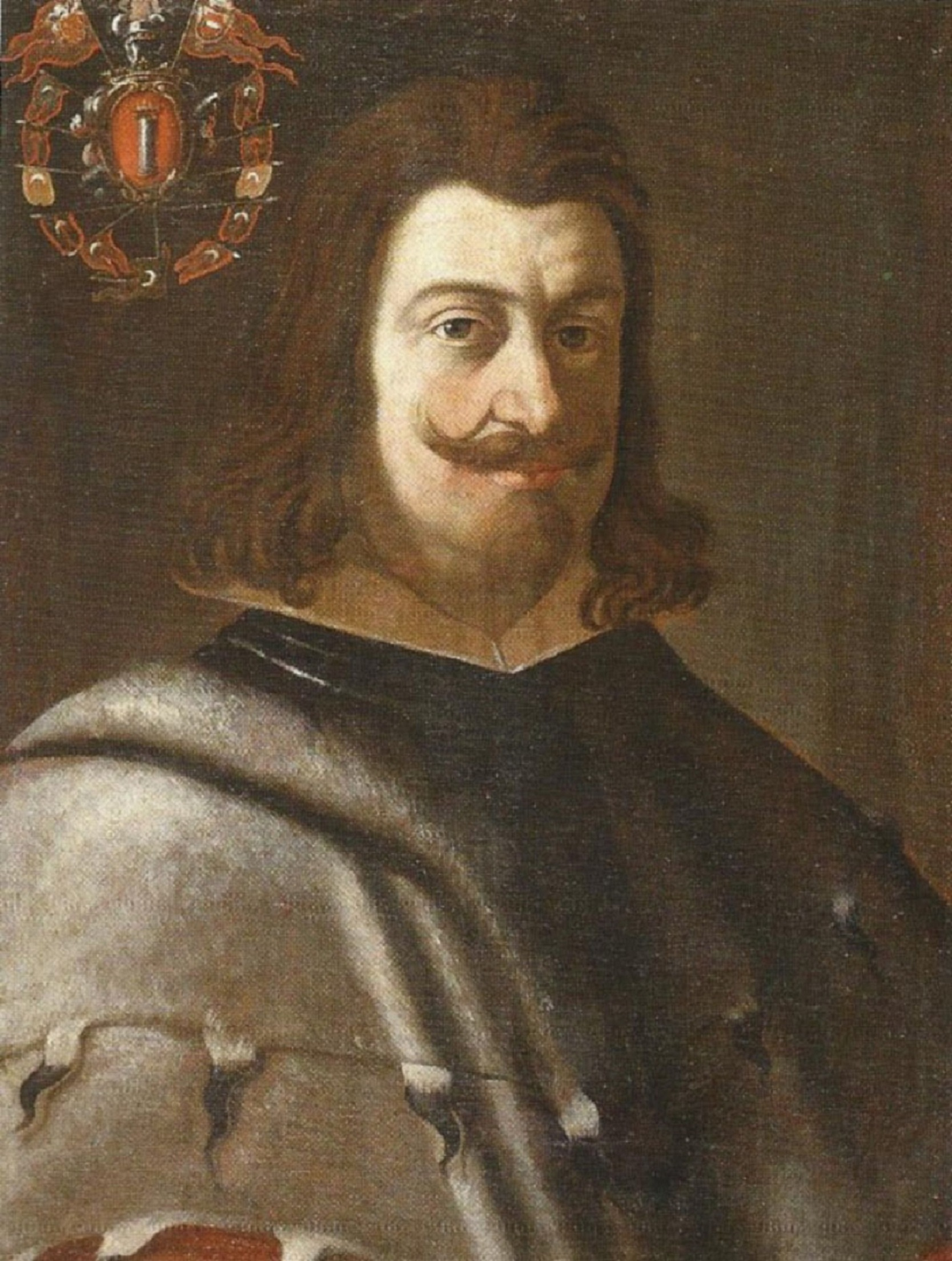
- Born: 1578; Rome
- Died: 11 April 1639
- Noble family: Colonna family
- Spouse: Lucrezia Tomacelli
- Father: Fabrizio Colonna
- Mother: Anna Borromeo

Filippo Colonna, 6th Prince of Paliano (1578 – 11 April 1639), Prince of Paliano, was an Italian nobleman, who was the head of the Colonna family of Rome and the hereditary Gran Connestabile at the court of Naples.

== Biography ==
He was born in Rome. A nephew of Carlo Borromeo and grand nephew of Gian Giacomo Medici, he married Lucrezia Tomacelli, of the Lords of Galatro (1576–1622) in 1597.

His rebuilding of Palazzo Colonna began the process of creating a unified structure of the assortment of medieval buildings. He realized the monumental garden entrance on Monte Cavallo. In 1639, he walked down a well known path by his home, and promptly died by slipping on a stone of sorts and splitting open his head on the rocks.

At his death it was revealed that he had appointed his second son, Girolamo, to be his heir, thus starting a war of succession between the eldest son, Federico, and Girolamo.

== Children ==
He had five children;

- Anna Colonna (died 1658), wife of Taddeo Barberini (Prince of Palestrina). Mother of Lucrezia Barberini, Duchess of Modena, of Maffeo Barberini and of Carlo Barberini.
- Federico Colonna, Prince of Paliano, Prince of Butera (1601–1641) married Margherita Branciforte and had issue;
- Girolamo Colonna (1604–1666) elevated to Cardinal in 1627 by Pope Urban VIII (the uncle of his brother-in-law Taddeo).
- Marcantonio V Colonna, Prince of Paliano (1606/1610–1659) married Isabella Gioeni Cardona, Princess of Castiglione and had issue including Lorenzo Onofrio Colonna.
- Carlo Colonna, Duke of the Marsi, Patriarch of Jerusalem (1607–1686) died unmarried.
- Chiara Maria Colonna (April 1610-1676), in religion Sister Chiara Maria della Passione, discalced Carmelite, foundress of the convent Regina Coeli in Naples.
- Vittoria Colonna (1620-?)
