= Lorenzo Onofrio Colonna, 8th Prince of Paliano =

Italian nobleman

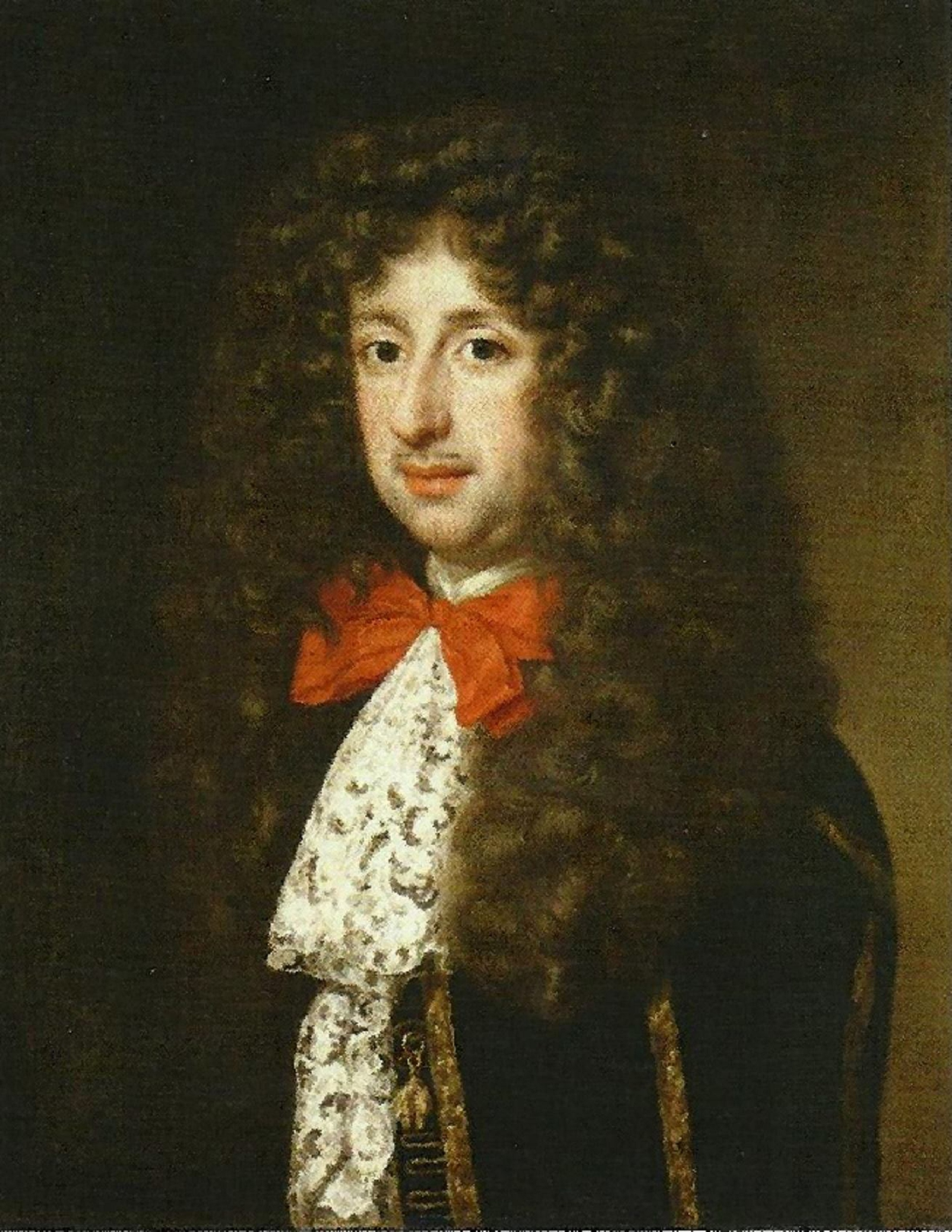
Prince Lorenzo Onofrio Colonna by Jacob Ferdinand Voet, c. 1684 – 89.

Lorenzo Onofrio Colonna (1637–1689) was an Italian nobleman of the Colonna family. He was the 8th Duke and Prince of Paliano and hereditary Grand Constable of the Kingdom of Naples. He was also a Knight of the Golden Fleece.

== Biography ==
Colonna was born in Rome, the son of Marcantonio V Colonna, Prince of Paliano and Isabella Gioeni Cardona, Princess of Castiglione. He was the nephew of Anna Colonna, who married Taddeo Barberini, Prince of Palestrina. He was inducted into the Order of the Golden Fleece in the same year as his cousin, Maffeo Barberini.

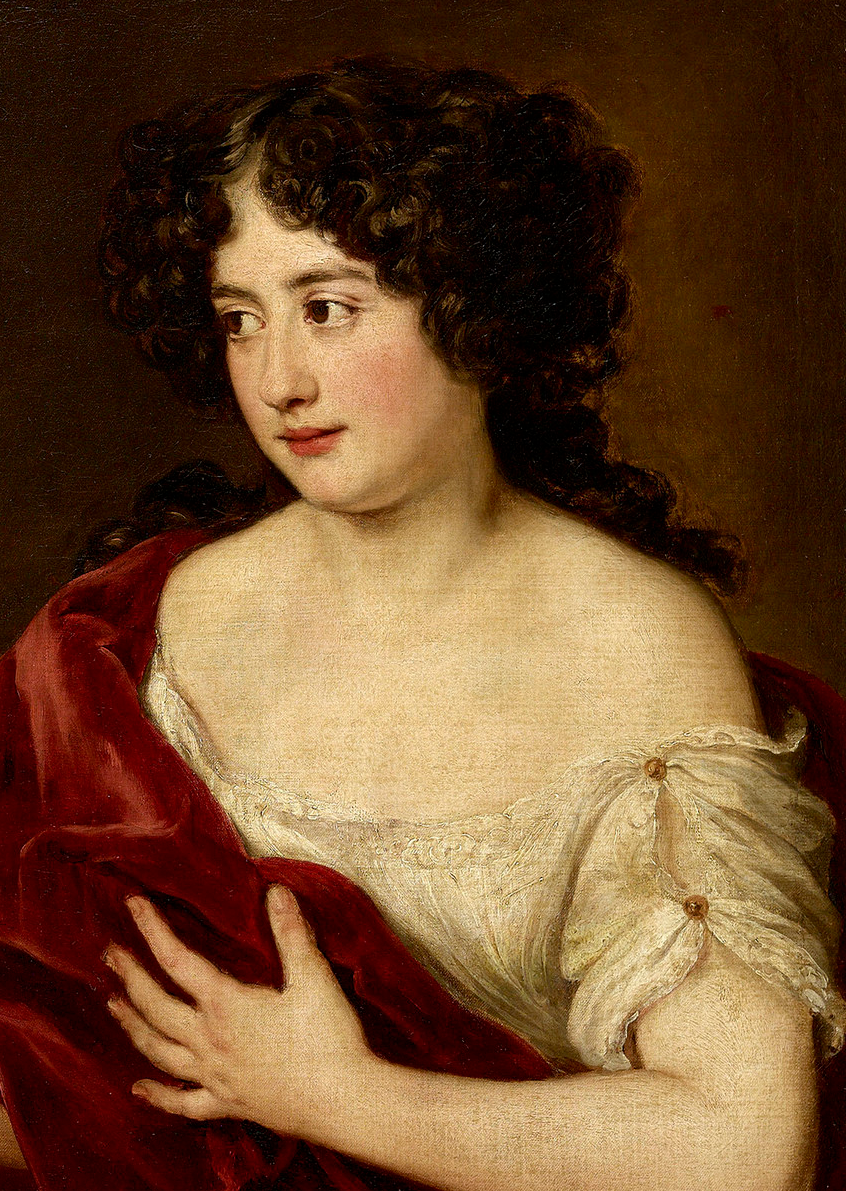
Maria Mancini Colonna by Jacob Ferdinand Voet

In 1661, he married Maria Mancini, a niece of Cardinal Mazarin. She was the first love of Louis XIV whose desire to marry her caused his mother, Anne of Austria, and Maria's uncle intense concern. The relationship between Maria and Louis was an idealistic one, and remained unconsummated. Colonna remarked after their wedding night that he was surprised to find her still a virgin, famously stating that he had not expected to find "innocence among the loves of kings."

He and his wife became great patrons of the arts and exercised influence in the cultural and political spheres of Rome and Italy. Many artists, such as Nicolò Minato and Francesco Cavalli dedicated works to the Colonnas. Despite Colonna's prestigious French marriage, the Colonna family was generally aligned with Spanish interests in Italy. The family's rivals in Rome, the Orsini and Barberini were French partisans.

After the birth of their third son, relations between Colonna and his wife deteriorated for multiple reasons, including his infidelities and her fears of further childbirth.

On 29 May 1672, fearing that her husband would kill her, Mancini left Rome, accompanied by her sister Hortense Mancini. She did not return to Italy until her husband's death in 1689.

Between 1678 and 1681, Colonna was appointed Viceroy of Aragon, in Spain.

== Issue ==
Lorenzo Onofrio Colonna and Maria Mancini had three children:

- Filippo II Colonna (1663-1714)
- Marcantonio Colonna (1664-1715)
- Cardinal Carlo Colonna (1665-1739)

Colonna also had two children by the Countess Ortensia Stella, whom he acknowledged in his will.
