= Count Sesto =

Coat of arms of the Spinola family, Sesto line

Count Sesto is the title borne by the current head of the existing noble family of that name, of ancient Genoese and subsequently Sicilian origin.

The comital family traces its origins as a collateral branch of the patrician Spinola family of Genoa, subsequently created Marquis and then Duke of Sesto and Marquis of Venafro (sometimes called Benafro). The Spinola, Doria, Grimaldi and Fieschi were the principal four families of Genoa, rivals for authority within the republic of Genoa in the 13th and 14th centuries. The Spinola family were allied to the Squarciafico family (created Marquess of Galatone), the Princes of Belmonte, and the Counts of Galerata. Distinguished members of the Spinola family include the celebrated general Ambrogio Spinola, Duke and Marquis of Sesto (1569–1630), his son Filippo Spinola (1596–1659) and Ambrose Spinola de la Cerda y Colonna, 5th Marquis of los Balbases and Duke of Sesto (1701–1757), all of whom were Knights of the Order of the Golden Fleece. All bore the title of Marquis or Duke of Sesto, as well as the title of Duke of San Severino, later to become celebrated by Stendhal.

The current comital family, through marriage and inheritance, established itself in the Kingdoms of Naples and Sicily, first in the area of Salerno and later in Sicily, in the area of Messina, over time being known as Sesto, derivation of the original familial title. In 1711, following the death of Don Gaetano Pinelli, Duke of Acerenza, Marquess of Galatone and Count of Copertino, and concomitant with the arrangements which led to the succession of Oronzo Ravaschieri Fieschi Pinelli, 5th Prince of Belmonte to the titles of Duke of Acerenza, Marquess of Galatone and Count of Copertino, the last two titles being created in 1562 for the Squarciafico family, the Sesto line, allied by marriage to the Squarciafico family since the marriage of Giulio Cesare, 2nd Marquess of Galatone to Lelia Spinola, daughter of Filippo Spinola, Duke of Sesto and Marquess of Venafro, was granted the title of Count in the Kingdoms of Naples and Sicily by Philip V of Spain (Philip IV of Naples and Philip IV of Sicily). The grant was accompanied by feuds and estates at Castroreale, Barcellona and Novara in the Province of Messina. Following the Bourbon restoration in Naples in 1734 and in Sicily in 1735, confirmed by the Treaty of Vienna, the titles and patents of nobility which had been conferred by the first Bourbon monarch were recognized or confirmed by Charles III of Spain (Charles VII of Naples and Charles V of Sicily), accompanied by a further grant of feuds and estates at Francavilla and Savoca in the province of Messina.

The current head of the comital family, Count Cesare Filippo Ambrogio Sesto lives in Tuscany.
