= Miraglia =

Miraglia is an Italian surname. Notable people with the surname include:

- Corrado Miraglia (1821–1881), Italian operatic tenor
- Emilio Miraglia (born 1924), Italian film director
- Luigi Miraglia (born 1965), Italian latinist and classicist
- Luigi Miraglia (politician) (1846–1903), Italian law professor
- Mauro Miraglia (born 1997), Argentine footballer
- Michele Miraglia (1935–2023), Italian executive and politician
- Túlio Miraglia (born 1930), Brazilian sports shooter
