= Prospero II Colonna =

His Eminence Prospero Colonna
- Cardinal-Deacon of Sant'Agata de' Goti
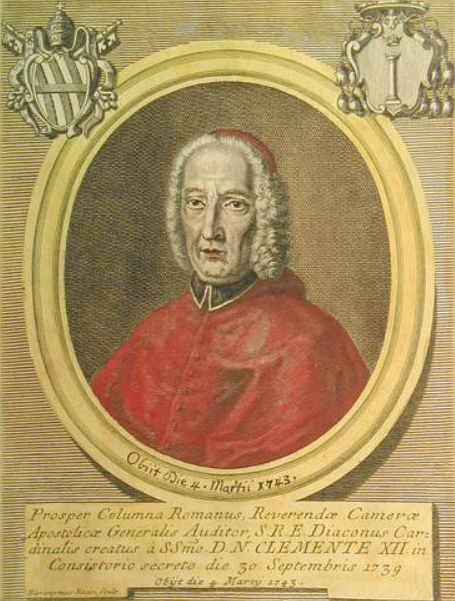
- Church: Catholic Church

Personal details
- Born: 27 November 1672 Marino, Lazio, Italy
- Died: 4 March 1743 (aged 70)

Prospero Colonna (November 27, 1672 – March 4, 1743) was a Roman Catholic cardinal. He is also known as Prospero II Colonna to differentiate him from his elder relative cardinal Prospero I Colonna (1410–1463).

== Biography ==
Prospero Colonna was born on 27 Nov 1672 in the Castle di Marino, Marino, Lazio near Rome, the second child of Filippo Colonna and Cleria Cesarini.

Catholic Church titles
Preceded by Carlo Colonna	Cardinal-Deacon of Sant'Angelo in Pescheria; 1739–1743	Succeeded by Girolamo Colonna di Sciarra
