= Filippo Spinola, 2nd Marquis of Los Balbases =

Italian nobleman (1594–1659)

General Filippo Spinola 2nd Marquess of Balbases 2nd Duke of Sesto Duke of Sanverino
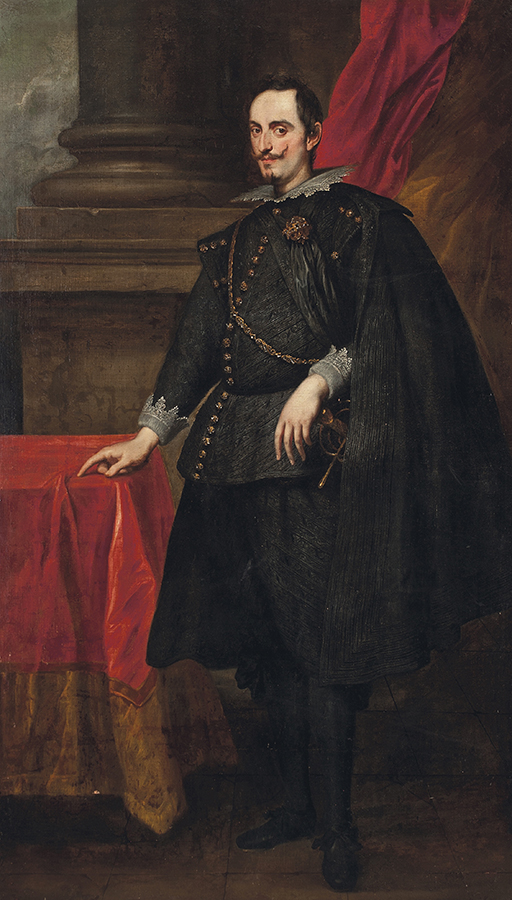
- Born: 17 July 1594; Genoa, Republic of Genoa
- Died: 8 August 1659 (aged 65); Madrid, Spanish Empire
- Spouse: Gironima Doria Spínola
- Children: Paolo Spinola, 3rd Marquis of Los Balbases
- Relatives: Ambrosio Spinola (father); Giovanna Bacciadonne (mother); Agustín de Spínola Basadone (brother); Polissena Spínola (sister)
- Military career
- Allegiance: Spanish Empire
- Branch: Spanish Army
- Rank: General
- Conflicts: Thirty Years' War: Siege of Casale; Eighty Years' War

President of the Supreme Council of Flanders
- In office June 1653 – 8 August 1659
- Monarch: Philip IV
- Valido: Luis de Haro
- Preceded by: Diego Felípez de Guzmán, 1st Marquis of Leganés
- Succeeded by: Antonio Sancho Davila, Marquis of Velada

Filippo Spinola, 2nd Marquis of Los Balbases (17 July 1594 in Genoa, Italy – 8 August 1659 in Madrid, Spain) was a Grandee of Spain, duke of San Severino, a Knight of the Order of the Golden Fleece, General of the Spanish Army and President of the Supreme Council of Flanders.

He was the son of Ambrogio Spinola, 1st Marquis of the Balbases (Genoa, Italy, 1569 – 25 September 1630), 1st duke of Sesto (title awarded in Naples on 2 April 1612), made a Grandee of Spain on 17 December 1621 with his marquisate, Conqueror of Breda, 1623, Governor of the Duchy of Milan, also a Knight of the Order of the Golden Fleece, 1631, and Giovanetta Bacciadone y Doria (1597–1615).

Filippo married Gironima Doria having five boys and one girl, later a nun, the third one being the first to survive after his childhood, and being therefore known as Paolo Vincenzo Spínola, 3rd marquis of Los Balbases (Milan, Italy, after February 1628 – Madrid, Spain, 23 December 1699).
