= Ludovico Colonna =

Italian condottiere

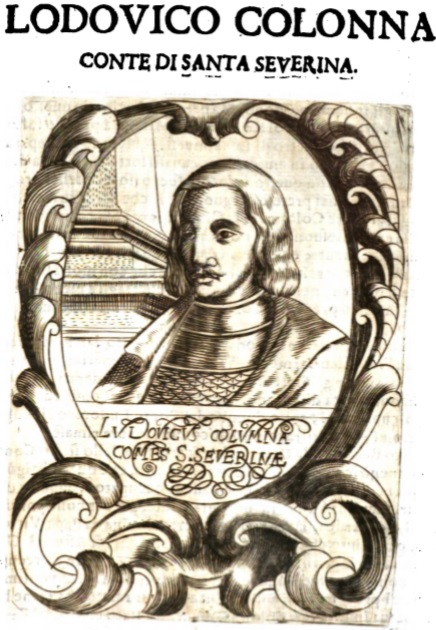
Posthumous 17th century portrait of Colonna

Ludovico Colonna (1390 - 12 October 1436) was an Italian condottiero, count of Santa Severina and lord of Ardea. An illegitimate son of Giovanni Colonna, he began his military career at a young age, joining Braccio da Montone's 'compagnia di ventura'. He died at Ardea.
