= Colonna family =

Italian noble family

Colonna
- Black noble family
- Country: Papal States; Kingdom of Naples; Kingdom of Sicily; Kingdom of Italy
- Current region: Italy; Vatican City
- Etymology: "Column", from city of Colonna
- Origin: Tusculum, Alban Hills
- Founded: 1078; 948 years ago
- Founder: Pietro Colonna
- Current head: Don Prospero Colonna Prince of Avella (Paliano line)
- Titles: List: Pope (non-hereditary); Prince assistant to the Papal throne (1514–2018); Prince of Paliano (1556–present); Prince of Stigliano (1796–present); Prince of Sonnino (1503–1796); Prince of Carbognano (1630–present); Prince of Salerno (1419–1432); Prince of Gallicano (13th century–1870); Prince of Palestrina (12th century–1630); Prince of the Holy Roman Empire; Roman Patrician (1101–1870)
- Members: Prospero Colonna (b.1956); Marcantonio Colonna (b.1948); Giovanni Andrea Colonna (b.1975); Filippo Colonna (b.1995)
- Motto: "Semper Immota" ("Always steadfast" or "Always unshaken")
- Estates: Palazzo Colonna (seat); Colonna Palace of Paliano
- Website: www.galleriacolonna.it/i-colonna/

The House of Colonna is a prominent Italian family, forming part of the papal nobility. It played a pivotal role in medieval and Renaissance Rome, supplying one pope (Martin V), 23 cardinals and many other church and political leaders.

Other notable family members are Vittoria Colonna, close friend of Michelangelo, Marcantonio II Colonna (Marcantonio Colonna), leader of the papal fleet in the Battle of Lepanto (1571) and Costanza Colonna, patron and protector of Caravaggio.

The family was notable for its bitter feud with the Orsini family over their influence in Rome, which was eventually settled by the issuing of the papal bull Pax Romana by Pope Julius II in 1511.

In 1571, the heads of both families married nieces of Pope Sixtus V. Thereafter, historians recorded that "no peace had been concluded between the princes of Christendom, in which they had not been included by name". Today, the family is led by Don Prospero Colonna (b.1956).

== History ==
=== Origins ===
According to tradition, the Colonna family is a branch of the Counts of Tusculum — by Peter (Pietro Colonna, 1078–1108 or 1099–1151) son of Gregory III, called Peter "de Columna" (Petrus de Columna) from his property the Columna Castle in Colonna, in the Alban Hills and Lord of Colonna, Monteporzio, Zagarolo and Gallicano. Further back, they trace their lineage past the Counts of Tusculum via Lombard and Italo-Roman nobles, merchants, and clergy through the Early Middle Ages — ultimately claiming origins from the Julio-Claudian dynasty and the gens Julia whose origin is lost in the mists of time but which entered the annals for the first time in 489 BC with the consulship of Gaius Julius Iullus. Peter married Elena, Lady of Palestrina, widow of a Donodeo and relative of Pope Paschal II.

The first cardinal from the family was appointed in 1206, when Giovanni Colonna di Carbognano was made Cardinal Deacon of SS. Cosma e Damiano. For many years, Cardinal Giovanni di San Paolo (elevated in 1193) was identified as a member of the Colonna family and therefore its first representative in the College of Cardinals, but modern scholars have established that this was based on false information from the beginning of the 16th century.

Giovanni Colonna (born c. 1206) nephew of Cardinal Giovanni Colonna di Carbognano, made his solemn vows as a Dominican around 1228 and received his theological and philosophical training at the Roman studium of Santa Sabina, the forerunner of the Pontifical University of Saint Thomas Aquinas, Angelicum. He served as the Provincial of the Roman province of the Dominican Order and led the provincial chapter of 1248 at Anagni. Colonna was appointed as Archbishop of Messina in 1255.

Margherita Colonna (died 1248) was a member of the Franciscan Order. She was beatified by Pope Pius IX in 1848.

Princely arms of the Gravina line of the house of Orsini

At this time, a rivalry began with the pro-papal Orsini family, leaders of the Guelph faction. This reinforced the pro-Emperor Ghibelline course that the Colonna family followed throughout the period of conflict between the Papacy and the Holy Roman Empire. Ironically according to their own family legend, the Orsini are also descended from the Julio-Claudian dynasty of ancient Rome.

=== Colonna versus the Papacy ===
In 1297, Cardinal Jacopo disinherited his brothers Ottone, Matteo, and Landolfo of their lands. The latter three appealed to Pope Boniface VIII, who ordered Jacopo to return the land, and furthermore hand over the family's strongholds of Colonna, Palestrina, and other towns to the Papacy. Jacopo refused; in May, Boniface removed him from the College of Cardinals and excommunicated him and his followers.

The Colonna family (aside from the three brothers allied with the Pope) declared that Boniface had been elected illegally following the unprecedented abdication of Pope Celestine V. The dispute led to open warfare, and in September, Boniface appointed Landolfo to the command of his army, to put down the revolt of Landolfo's own Colonna relatives. By the end of 1298, Landolfo had captured Colonna, Palestrina and other towns, and razed them to the ground. The family's lands were distributed among Landolfo and his loyal brothers; the rest of the family fled Italy.

The exiled Colonnas allied with the Pope's other great enemy, Philip IV of France, who in his youth had been tutored by Cardinal Egidio Colonna. In September 1303, Sciarra and Philipp's advisor, Guillaume de Nogaret, led a small force into Anagni to arrest Boniface VIII and bring him to France, where he was to stand trial. The two managed to apprehend the pope, and Sciarra reportedly slapped the pope in the face in the process, which was accordingly dubbed the "Outrage of Anagni". The attempt eventually failed after a few days, when locals freed the pope. However, Boniface VIII died on 11 October, allowing France to dominate his weaker successors during the Avignon papacy.

=== Late Middle Ages ===
The family remained at the centre of civic and religious life throughout the late Middle Ages. Cardinal Egidio Colonna died at the papal court in Avignon in 1314. An Augustinian, he had studied theology in Paris under St. Thomas of Aquinas to become one of the most authoritative thinkers of his time.

In the 14th century, the family sponsored the decoration of the Church of San Giovanni, most notably the floor mosaics.

In 1328, Louis IV of Germany marched into Italy for his coronation as Holy Roman Emperor. As Pope John XXII was residing in Avignon and had publicly declared that he would not crown Louis, the King decided to be crowned by a member of the Roman aristocracy, who proposed Sciarra Colonna. In honor of this event, the Colonna family was granted the privilege of using the imperial pointed crown on top of their coat of arms.

The poet Petrarch, was a great friend of the family, in particular of Giovanni Colonna and often lived in Rome as a guest of the family. He composed a number of sonnets for special occasions within the Colonna family, including "Colonna the Glorious, the great Latin name upon which all our hopes rest". In this period, the Colonna started claiming they were descendants of the Julio-Claudian dynasty.

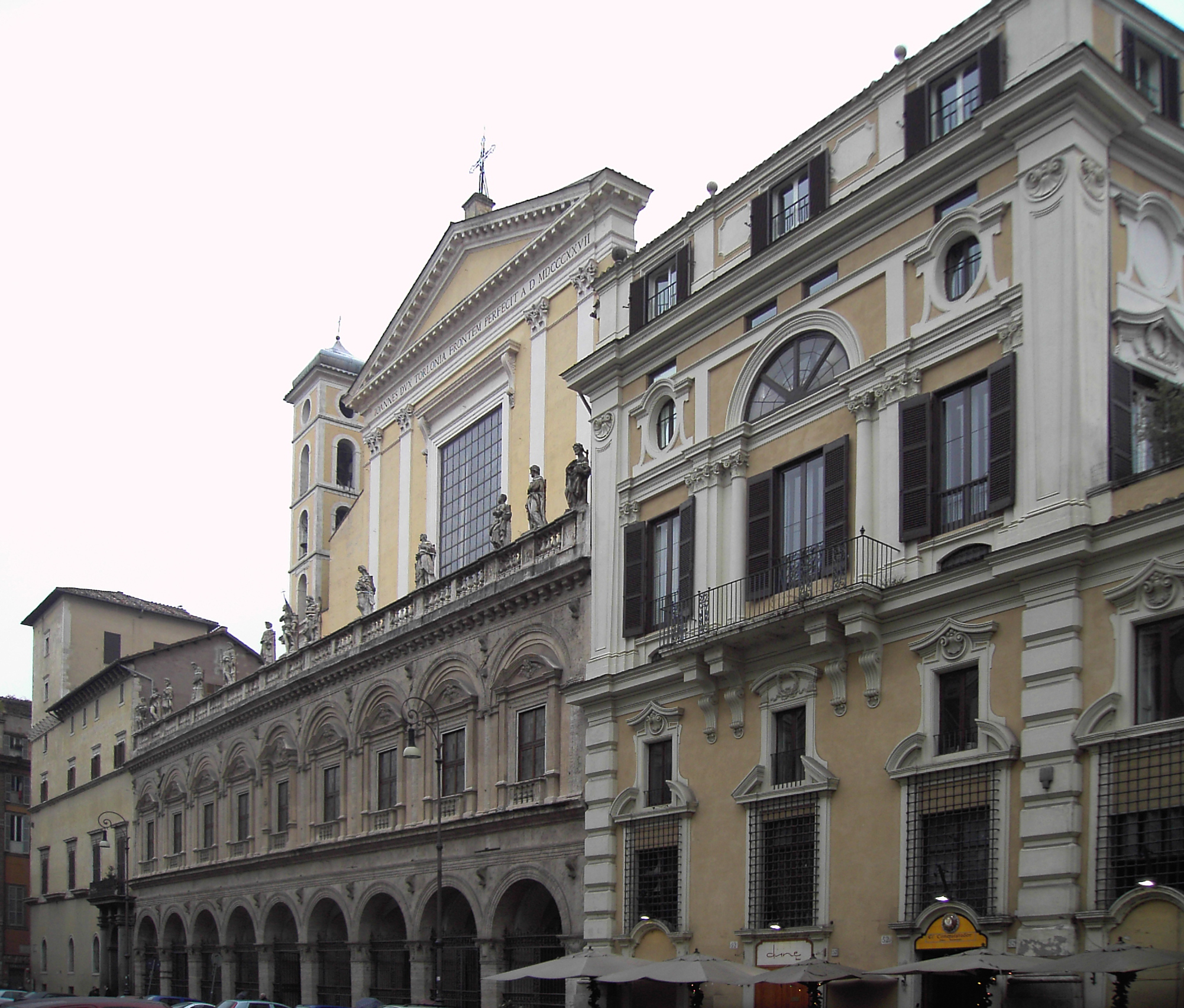
Palazzo Colonna in Rome (begun by Pope Martin V, to this day residence of the family)

At the Council of Constance, the Colonna finally succeeded in their papal ambitions when Oddone Colonna was elected on 14 November 1417. As Martin V, he reigned until his death on 20 February 1431.

=== Early modern period ===
Vittoria Colonna became famous in the sixteenth century as a poet and a figure in literate circles.

In 1627 Anna Colonna, daughter of Filippo I Colonna, married Taddeo Barberini of the family Barberini; nephew of Pope Urban VIII.

In 1728, the Carbognano branch (Colonna di Sciarra) of the Colonna family added the name Barberini to its family name when Giulio Cesare Colonna di Sciarra married Cornelia Barberini, daughter of the last male Barberini to hold the name and granddaughter of Maffeo Barberini (son of Taddeo Barberini).

=== Current status ===
The Colonna family were Prince Assistants to the Papal Throne.

The family residence in Rome, the Palazzo Colonna, is open to the public every Friday and Saturday morning.

The main 'Colonna di Paliano' line is represented today by Prince Marcantonio Colonna di Paliano, Prince and Duke of Paliano (b. 1948), whose heir is Don Giovanni Andrea Colonna di Paliano (b. 1975), and by Don Prospero Colonna di Paliano, Prince of Avella (b. 1956), whose heir is Don Filippo Colonna di Paliano (b. 1995).

The 'Colonna di Stigliano' line is represented by Don Prospero Colonna di Stigliano, Prince of Stigliano (b. 1938), whose heir is his nephew Don Stefano Colonna di Stigliano (b. 1975).

== Notable members ==
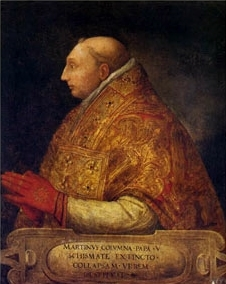
Oddo Colonna (1368–1431), Pope Martin V (1417–1431)

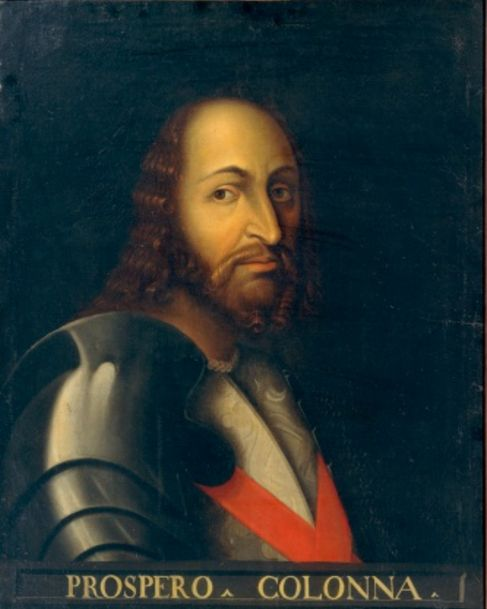
Prospero Colonna (1452–1523), condottiero once held as the best general in Italy.

- Blessed Margherita Colonna (c. 1255 – 1280)
- Stefano Colonna (1265 – c. 1348), an influential noble in Medieval Rome and Imperial vicar in the early 14th century
- Jacopo Colonna (1250–1318), cardinal
- Giacomo "Sciarra" Colonna (1270–1329), who took part in the Outrage of Anagni against Pope Boniface VIII
- Giovanni Colonna (1295–1348), influential cardinal during the Avignon papacy
- Oddone Colonna (1369–1431), whose election as Pope Martin V in 1417 ended the Western Schism
- Ludovico Colonna (1390–1436), condottiero
- Prospero I Colonna (1410–1463), cardinal
- Fabrizio Colonna (c. 1450 – 1520), condottiero, the father of Vittoria Colonna, and a general in the Holy League
- Prospero Colonna (1452–1523), famed condottiero, who fought alongside his cousin Fabrizio Colonna
- Francesco Colonna (1453? – 1517?) [La "Pugna d'amore in sogno" di Francesco Colonna Romano, 1996, Maurizio Calvesi], who was credited (along with the monk Francesco Colonna) with the authorship of the Hypnerotomachia Poliphili by an acrostic in the text; also believed to have written the story
- Marcantonio I Colonna (1478–1522), condottiero of the 15th–16th centuries
- Pompeo Colonna (1479–1532), cardinal, a nephew of Prospero Colonna, mentioned above. Viceroy of Naples from 1530 to 1532
- Vittoria Colonna (1490–1547), friend of Michelangelo. Married in 1507 the Spanish-Italian Fernando d'Avalos, marquis of Pescara (deceased 1525), adopting (on becoming a widow) Alfonso d'Avalos, also marquis del Vasto, a nephew of her former husband
- Pirro Colonna (1500–1552), 16th century captain under Charles V, Holy Roman Emperor
- Marco Antonio Colonna (1523–1597), cardinal
- Marcantonio II Colonna the Younger (1535–1584), Duke of Tagliacozzo. Son of Ascanio Colonna and Juana de Aragón. He participated in the naval Battle of Lepanto against the Turks, 7 October 1571 and was Viceroy of Sicily in 1577–1584. Prince of Paliano.
- Ascanio Colonna (1560–1608), cardinal
- Federico Colonna y Tomacelli, Prince of Butera (1601–1641), Viceroy of Valencia, in Spain, 1640–1641, Viceroy of Catalonia, 1641. He was Great Constable of the kingdom of Naples (1639–1641) as had been his father Filippo I Colonna, (1578 – 11 April 1639).
- Marcantonio V Colonna (1606/1610–1659), Prince of Paliano
- Lorenzo Onofrio Colonna, Viceroy of Aragon, 1678–1681, in Spain
- Prospero II Colonna (1662–1743), cardinal
- Carlo Colonna (1665–1739), cardinal, created by Clement XI in 1706
- Marcantonio Colonna (1724–1793), cardinal
- Giovanni Antonio Colonna (1878–1940), politician
- Guido Colonna di Paliano (1908–1982), diplomat and European Commissioner

== See also ==
- Medieval Rome
- Orsini family
- Palestrina
- Prösels Castle
- Palazzo Colonna (Marino)

== Sources ==
- Original 1922 Almanach de Gotha (edited by Justice Perthes) entry for the Colonna family, link to the original universally-recognised genealogical reference document, with details of family honours
