= Princes of Paliano =

Coat of arms of the Colonna family.

The title Duke and Prince of Paliano is borne by the head of the elder line of the Colonna family. At times the honour has been borne by several members at once. The Princes also bear many other titles and honorifics.

The Princes of Summonte are a cadet branch of the Princes of Paliano.

== Lords of Paliano ==
- Lorenzo Onofrio I Colonna (1417–1423)
- Antonio Colonna (1423–1471) - son of Lorenzo Onofrio
- Pietro Antonio Colonna (1471– ) - son of Antonio
- Prospero Colonna (1423–1463) - brother of Antonio
- Odoardo Colonna (1423–1485) - brother of Antonio
- Marcantonio I Colonna (1485–1522) - son of Pietro Antonio
- Vespasiano Colonna (1522–1528) - grandson of Antonio; son of the condottiero Prospero Colonna
- Fabrizio I Colonna (1485–1519) - son of Odoardo

== Dukes of Paliano ==
- Fabrizio I Colonna (1519–1520)
- Ascanio Colonna (1520–1556) - son of Fabrizio I
- Giovanni Carafa (1556–1559) - nephew of Pope Paul IV

== Duke-Princes of Paliano ==
- Marcantonio II Colonna (1559–1585) - son of Ascanio
- Marcantonio III Colonna (1585–1595) - grandson of Marcantonio II
- Marcantonio IV Colonna (1595–1611) - son of Marcantonio III
- Filippo I Colonna (1611–1639) - brother of Marcantonio III
- Girolamo Colonna (1639–1666) - son of Filippo I, contested by brother Frederico
- Marcantonio V Colonna (1639–1659) - brother of Girolamo and son of Filippo I. Prince while his brothers fought over the Duchy.
- Lorenzo Onofrio II Colonna (1659/66–1689) - son of Marcantonio V
- Filippo II Colonna (1689–1714) - son of Lorenzo Onofrio II
- Fabrizio II Colonna (1714–1755) - son of Filippo II
- Lorenzo Onofrio Colonna, 11th Prince of Paliano (1755–1779) - son of Fabrizio II
- Filippo III Giuseppe Colonna (1779–1818) - son of Lorenzo II
- Aspreno I Colonna (1818–1847) - brother of Filippo III
- Giovanni Andrea Colonna (1847–1894) - son of Aspreno I
- Marcantonio VI Colonna (1894–1912) - son of Giovanni Andrea
- Fabrizio III Colonna (1912–1923) - brother of Marcantonio VI
- Marcantonio VII Colonna (1923–1947) - son of Fabrizio III
- Aspreno II Colonna (1947–1987) - son of Marcantonio VII
- Marcantonio VIII Colonna (1948– ) - son of Aspreno II
