= Battle of Lepanto =

1571 naval battle of the Ottoman–Habsburg wars

- Part of the Spanish–Ottoman wars, the Ottoman–Habsburg wars and the Fourth Ottoman–Venetian War
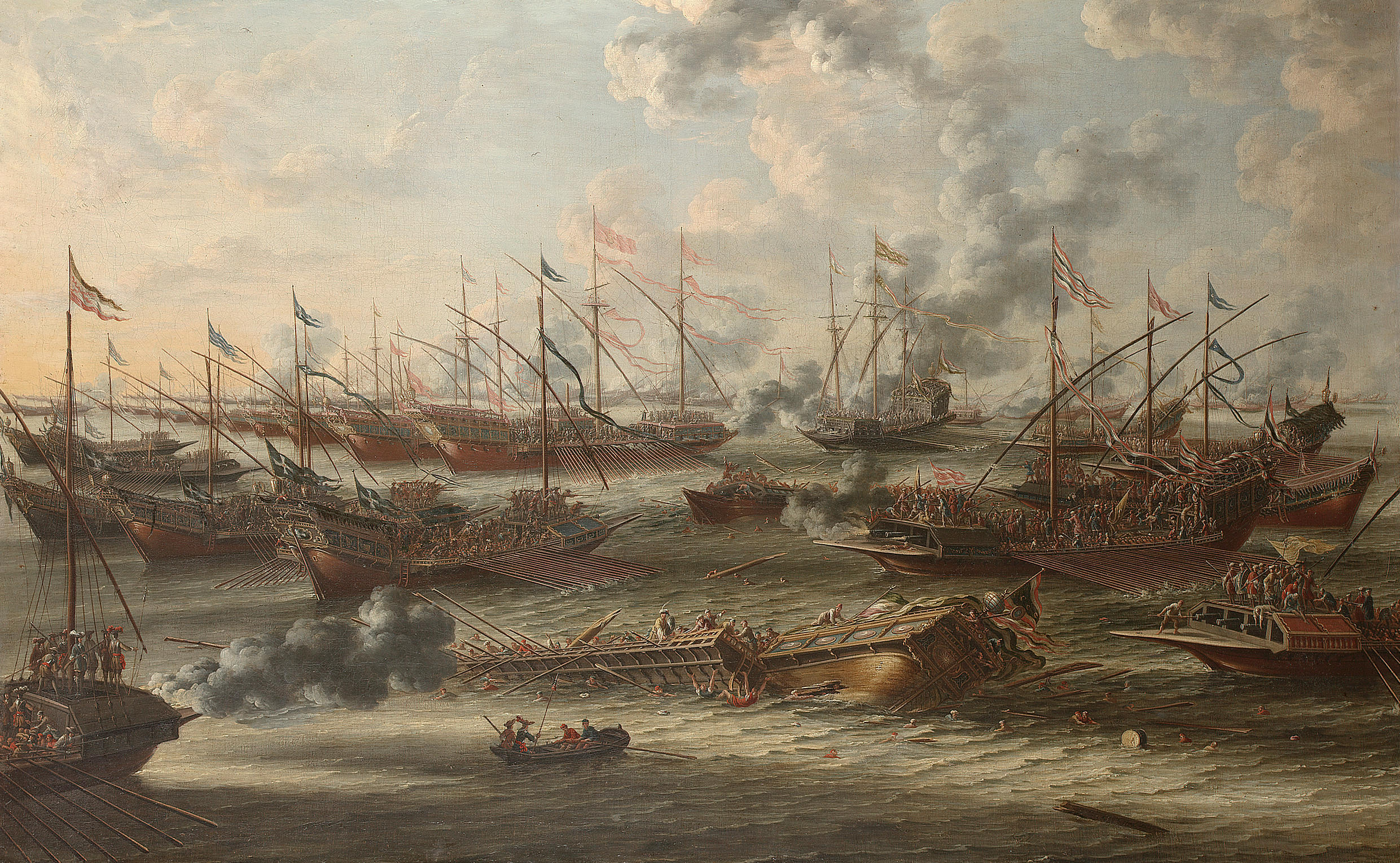
- 1683 painting of the battle
Date	7 October 1571
Location	Gulf of Patras, Ionian Sea 38°15′N 21°15′E
Result	Holy League victory

Belligerents
Holy League: Spanish Empire; Venice; Genoa; Savoy; Tuscany; Order of Saint Stephen; Order of Malta; Papal States	Ottoman Empire: Regency of Algiers

Commanders and leaders
(Spanish Empire) John of Austria (Spanish Empire) Álvaro de Bazán (Spanish Empire) Luis de Requesens (Republic of Venice) Sebastiano Venier (Republic of Venice) Agostino Barbarigo (DOW) (Republic of Genoa) Gianandrea Doria (Papal States) Marcantonio Colonna (Order of Knights of the Hospital of Saint John of Jerusalem) Pietro Giustiniani	Ali Pasha †; Mahomet Sirocco †; Occhiali; Caracossa

Strength
85,900 men (Note: Among them, 30,000 soldiers, 12,900 sailors and 43,000 oarsmen. Capponi also states 30,000 soldiers, while Nolan cites a similar figure of some 80,000 men total on the Christian side.); 212 ships (Note: Holy League ship count: 109 galleys and 6 galleasses of the Venetian republic; 49 galleys of the Spanish Empire; 27 galleys of the Geneose republic; 7 galleys of the Papal States; 5 galleys of the Order of Saint Stephen; 3 galleys of the Duchy of Tuscany; 3 galleys of the Duchy of Savoy; 3 galleys of the Order of Malta)	88,000 men (Note: Of the 88,000 total, 34,000 were soldiers, 13,000 were sailors, and 41,000 were oarsmen. Nolan also states up to 90,000 men for the Ottomans.); 274 ships (Note: 211 galleys and 63 galliots.)

Casualties and losses
7,500–10,000 killed 13 galleys sunk or destroyed	20,000–40,000 killed 200 galleys (117 captured, 83 sunk or destroyed)
- 15,000 Christian slaves freed 10,000 Christian slaves drowned
- Location within Greece Battle of Lepanto (Peloponnese)

The Battle of Lepanto was a naval engagement that took place on 7 October 1571 when a fleet of the Holy League, a coalition of Catholic states arranged by Pope Pius V and led by the navies of the Spanish Empire and the Republic of Venice, inflicted a major defeat on the fleet of the Ottoman Empire in the Gulf of Patras. The Ottoman forces were sailing westward from their naval station in Lepanto (the Venetian name of ancient Naupactus – Greek Ναύπακτος, Turkish İnebahtı) when they met the fleet of the Holy League which was sailing east from Messina, Sicily and used Kefalonia as its launching point.

Lepanto marks the last major engagement in the Western world to be fought almost entirely between rowing vessels, namely the galleys and galleasses, which were the direct descendants of ancient trireme warships. The battle was in essence an "infantry battle on floating platforms". It was the largest naval battle in Western history since classical antiquity, involving more than 450 warships. Over the following decades, the increasing importance of the galleon would displace the galley as the major warship of its era, marking the beginning of the "Age of Sail".

The victory of the Holy League is of great importance in the history of Europe and of the Ottoman Empire, with the Ottoman fleet almost completely destroyed. The Ottomans rapidly rebuilt their fleet, but the loss of qualified crews during the battle led to a sharp decrease of their naval initiative after 1580. The battle has long been compared to the Battle of Salamis, both for tactical parallels and for its crucial importance in the defense of Europe against imperial expansion. It was also of great symbolic importance in a period when Europe was torn by its own wars of religion following the Protestant Reformation. Pope Pius V instituted the feast of Our Lady of Victory, and Philip II of Spain used the victory to strengthen his position as the "Most Catholic King" and defender of Christendom against Muslim incursion. Historian Paul K. Davis writes that:

"More than a military victory, Lepanto was a moral one. For decades, the Ottoman Turks had terrified Europe, and the victories of Suleiman the Magnificent caused Christian Europe serious concern. The defeat at Lepanto further exemplified the rapid deterioration of Ottoman might under Selim II, and Christians rejoiced at this setback for the Ottomans. The mystique of Ottoman power was tarnished significantly by this battle, and Christian Europe was heartened."

== Background ==
Battle of Lepanto from Famous Sea Fights by John R. Hale

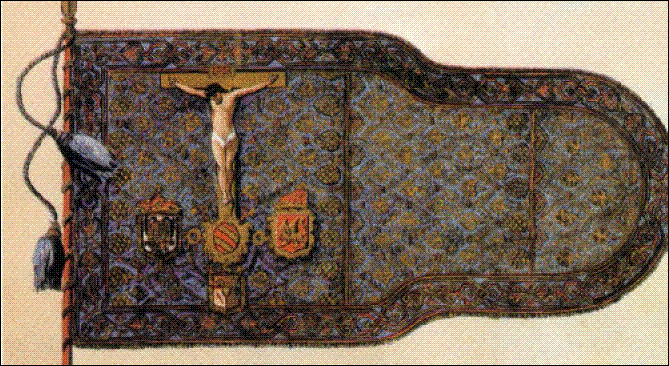
The banner of the Holy League, flown by John of Austria on his flagship Real. It is made of blue damask interwoven with gold thread, of a length of 7.3 m and a width of 4.4 m at the hoist. It displays the crucified Christ above the coats of arms of Pius V, of Venice, of Charles V, and of John of Austria. The coats of arms are linked by chains symbolizing the alliance.

The Christian coalition had been promoted by Pope Pius V to rescue the Venetian colony of Famagusta on the island of Cyprus, which was being besieged by the Turks in early 1571 subsequent to the fall of Nicosia and other Venetian possessions in Cyprus in the course of 1570. On 1 August the Venetians surrendered after being reassured that they could leave Cyprus freely. However, the Ottoman commander, Lala Kara Mustafa Pasha, had lost some 50,000 men in the siege and broke his word, imprisoning the Venetians, and had Marco Antonio Bragadin flayed alive.

The members of the Holy League were the Republic of Venice, the Spanish Empire (including the Kingdom of Naples, the Habsburg monarchy, the Kingdoms of Sicily and Sardinia as part of the Spanish possessions), the Papal States, the Republic of Genoa, the Duchies of Savoy, Urbino and Tuscany, the Knights Hospitaller, and others.

The banner for the fleet, blessed by the Pope, reached the Kingdom of Naples (then ruled by Philip II of Spain) on 14 August 1571, where it was solemnly consigned to John of Austria.

All members of the alliance viewed the Ottoman navy as a significant threat, both to the security of maritime trade in the Mediterranean Sea and to the security of continental Europe itself. Spain was the largest financial contributor, though the Spaniards preferred to preserve most of their galleys for Spain's own wars against the nearby sultanates of the Barbary Coast rather than expend its naval strength for the benefit of Venice. The combined Christian fleet was placed under the command of John of Austria with Marcantonio Colonna as his principal deputy. The various Christian contingents met the main force from Venice under Sebastiano Venier, later Doge of Venice, in July and August 1571 at Messina, Sicily.

== Deployment and order of battle ==
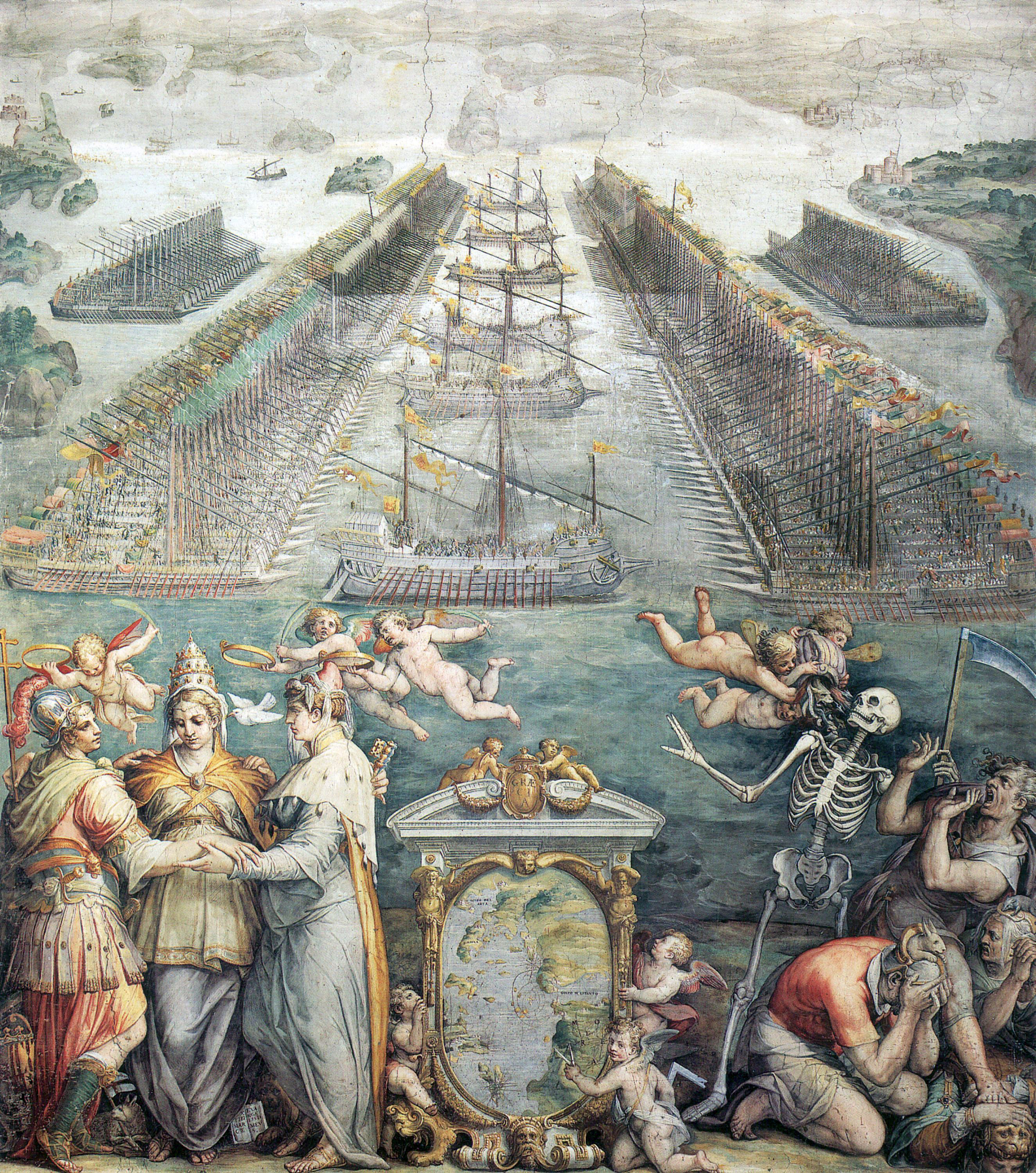
Order of battle of the two fleets, with an allegory of the three powers of the Holy League in the foreground, fresco by Giorgio Vasari (1572, Sala Regia) The six Venetian galleasses are shown between the two ranks of opposing galleys.

The Christian fleet consisted of 206 galleys and six galleasses (large new galleys with masts and sails in addition to their oars, and substantial artillery, developed by the Venetians). John of Austria, half-brother of Philip II of Spain, was named by Pope Pius V as overall commander of the fleet and led the centre division, with his principal deputies and counselors being the Roman Marcantonio Colonna and the Venetian Sebastiano Venier; the wings were commanded by the Venetian Agostino Barbarigo and the Genoese Gianandrea Doria. The reserve, meant to reinforce any necessary point of the line, was commanded by the Spanish Álvaro de Bazán.

Aside from the galleys and galleasses, the fleet included a division of galleons and carracks, composed by 24 from Spain and two Venetians. Not being rowing ships, they moved as an independent squad under the command of Carlo d'Avalos. There was also a squad of 76 galiots and fustas, including 50 from Spain, 20 from Venice and six from the Papal States, which would act as auxiliaries and messengers for the main fleet.

=== Holy League deployment ===
The Republic of Venice contributed 109 galleys and all six galleasses, 49 galleys came from the Spanish Empire (including 26 from the Kingdom of Naples, the Kingdom of Sicily, and other Italian territories), 27 galleys of the Genoese fleet, seven galleys from the Papal States, five galleys from the Order of Saint Stephen and the Grand Duchy of Tuscany, three galleys each from the Duchy of Savoy and the Knights of Malta, and some privately owned galleys in Spanish service. This fleet of the Christian alliance was manned by 40,000 sailors and oarsmen.

In addition, it carried approximately 30,000 fighting troops: 7,000 Spanish Empire regular infantry of excellent quality, belonging to the Tercios of Sicily, Naples, Sardinia and Figueroa, which comprised several units of Spanish Marine Infantry (4,000 of their troops were drawn from the Kingdom of Naples, mostly Calabria); 7,000 Germans landsknecht mercenaries and volunteers; 6,000 Italian mercenaries in Spanish pay, all good troops; all in addition to 5,000 professional Venetian soldiers. A significant number of Greeks also participated in the conflict on the side of the Holy League with three Venetian galleys commanded by Greek captains. The historian George Finlay estimated that over 25,000 Greeks fought on the side of the Holy League during the battle (both as soldiers and sailors/oarsmen) and stated that their numbers "far exceeded that of the combatants of any other nation engaged".

Oarsmen were mainly drawn from local Greek populations, particularly from the island of Kefalonia, who were experienced in maritime affairs, although there were some Venetian oarsmen as well. Free oarsmen were generally acknowledged to be superior to enslaved or imprisoned oarsmen, but the former were gradually replaced in all galley fleets (including those of Venice from 1549) during the 16th century by cheaper slaves, convicts, and prisoners-of-war owing to rapidly rising costs. The Venetian oarsmen were mainly free citizens and able to bear arms, adding to the fighting power of their ships, whereas convicts were used to row many of the galleys in other Holy League squadrons.

A heavy effort was done from the beginning to learn by past mistakes of the previous Holy League in the 1538 Battle of Preveza, where a similar alliance had been routed by an inferior Ottoman fleet. The new battle plan was heavily influenced by Viceroy of Sicily Garcia de Toledo, experienced in the Ottoman-Habsburg naval wars, who advised John of Austria that the fleet should adopt the battle plan used by the Ottomans themselves in Preveza. In order to prevent the infighting, John of Austria further ordered the fleet would not sail divided in national blocks as in Preveza, but in squads with galleys of all their nationalities intermixed, with the experienced Spanish and Italian infantry embarked in all of the vessels. He also arranged for the fleet to sail from Messina already in formation and maintain it up to the battle to earn cohesion and rowing experience. Gianandrea Doria also advised to saw off the long bow of the galleys so they could fire more easily their main guns at close range.

=== Turkish deployment ===
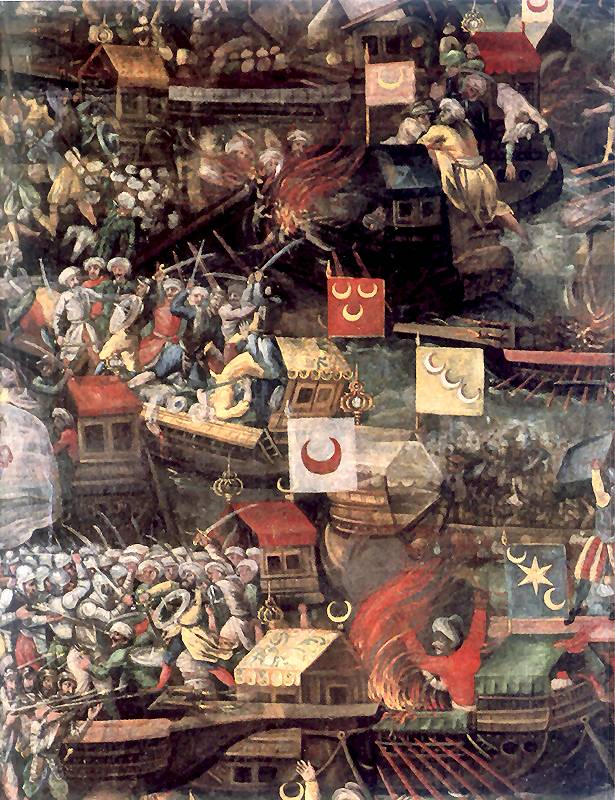
Depiction of the Ottoman Navy, detail from the painting by Tommaso Dolabella (1632)

Ali Pasha, the Ottoman admiral (Kapudan-i Derya), supported by the corsairs Mehmed Sirocco (Mehmed Şuluk) of Alexandria and Uluç Ali, commanded an Ottoman force of 211 war galleys, 63 galliots, and some smaller vessels. The Turks had skilled and experienced crews of sailors but were significantly deficient in their elite corps of janissaries. The number of oarsmen was about 37,000 to 41,000, virtually all of them slaves, many of them Christians who had been captured in previous conquests and engagements. The Ottoman galleys were manned by 13,000 experienced sailors—generally drawn from the maritime nations of the Ottoman Empire—mainly Greeks (according to Finlay, around 5,000), Berbers, Syrians, and Egyptians—and 25,000 soldiers from the Ottoman Empire as well as a few thousand from their North African allies. The number of soldiers within the Ottoman ranks may have well been up to 34,000 in total.

Ali Pasha is supposed to have told his Christian galley slaves, "If I win the battle, I promise you your liberty. If the day is yours, then God has given it to you." John of Austria, more laconically, warned his crew, "There is no paradise for cowards."

=== Comparison ===
While soldiers on board the ships were roughly matched in numbers, an advantage for the Christians was the numerical superiority in guns and cannon aboard their ships. It is estimated that the Christians had 1,815 guns, while the Turks had only 750 with insufficient ammunition. The Christians embarked with their much improved arquebusier and musketeer forces, while the Ottomans trusted in their greatly feared composite bowmen. Another differential factor was the Spanish experience at using marine infantry, adept at boarding enemy ships and fighting on their decks, even using pikes.

== Previous movements ==
=== Encounter of the fleets ===
An exploration party under Gil de Andrade warned the Holy League fleet about 150 Ottomans ships plundering the coast of Corfu, giving John of Austria the idea of catching and destroying them. The Christian fleet set off from Messina in two separate sections on 15 and 16 September, with d'Ávalos leading the sailing ships and Don John the rowing vessels. They crossed the Adriatic creeping along the coast, embarking reinforcements in Otranto and Corfu on the way, but failed to find the Ottomans, which were found out on September 29 to have moved to Lepanto. Serious conflict broke out between Venetians and Spaniards, and Venier offended John of Austria by hanging a Spanish soldier for killing a Venetian captain during a brawl. d'Ávalos also failed to rendezvous with the rest of the fleet due to unfavorable winds.

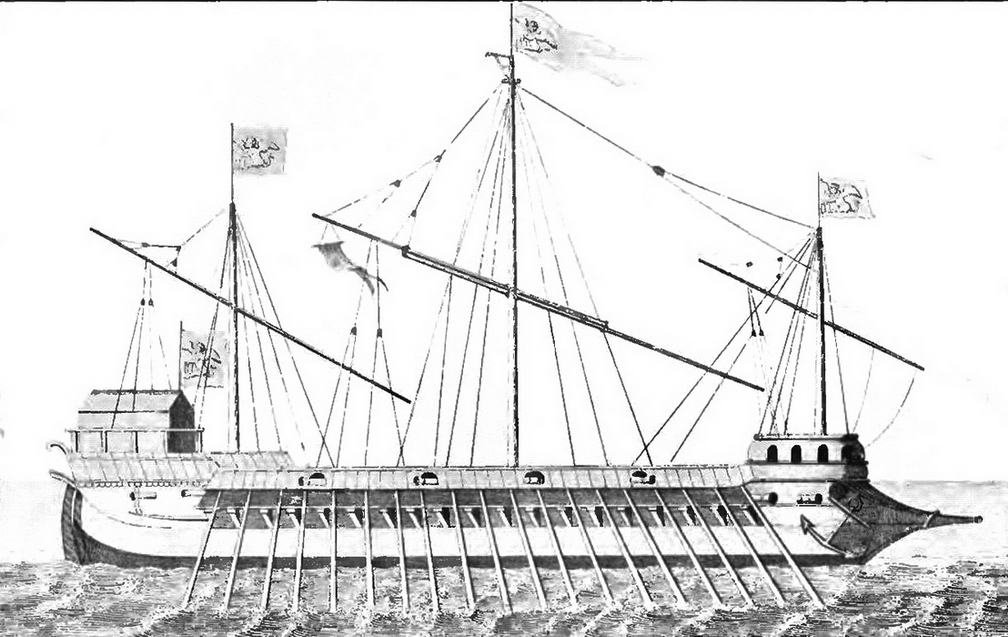
One of the Venetian Galleasses at Lepanto (1851 drawing, after a 1570s painting)

Eventually, and despite the weather, John of Austria and the fleet reached the rocky islets lying just north of the opening of the Gulf of Corinth on 6 October. After remaining for a while in the port of Val d'Alessandria, which is today known as the port of Sami in Kefalonia, early on 7 October they sailed toward the Gulf of Patras, where the Ottoman fleet remained. Christian parties discovered the Ottomans, while in turn Ali Pasha was warned of the oncoming fleet by two galleys, leading him to order a levy around Morea. Nevertheless, the two armadas ended up obtaining incorrect information about each other: the Christians were falsely reported that the Barbary squads had not joined the Ottoman fleet, while the Muslim explorers only got to see part of the Holy League fleet and underestimated its size.

Each fleet called a council. Although Doria and others recommended to avoid battle and not to risk the fleet, John of Austria pushed to engage, finding it necessary in order to maintain the integrity of the Holy League in the face of their disagreements. In the Ottoman fleet, Sirocco advised to take refuge under the fortress of Lepanto and wait for the Christians to be worn down by autumn, while Hasan Pasha and other officers called to fight, trusting their numbers and experience and noting that the Christian fleet was vulnerable without d'Ávalos' sailing ships. They also reminded that Selim II had issued express orders to destroy the Christian fleet. Eventually, Ali Pasha ordered to engage.

=== Holy League formation ===
On the morning of 7 October, after the decision to offer battle was made, the Christian fleet formed up in four divisions in a north–south line:

- At the northern end, closest to the coast, was the Left Division of 53 galleys (mainly Venetian) and 2 galleasses, led by Agostino Barbarigo, with Marco Querini and Antonio da Canale in support.
- The Centre Division consisted of 62 galleys (and 2 galleasses) under John of Austria himself in his galley La Real, along with Marcantonio Colonna (Duke of Tagliacozzo) commanding the papal flagship, Sebastiano Veniero commanding the Venetian flagship, Paolo Giordano I Orsini and Pietro Giustiniani, prior of Messina, commanding the flagship of the Knights of Malta. The central division of 16 Spanish and Neapolitan galleys, organized into squadrons surrounding John of Austria's flagship, was commanded by three captains. Among them, Captain Diego de Medrano led the Fortuna de Napoli galley, Captain Martino de Caide commanded the Mendoza de Naples, and Captain Diego López de Llanos helmed the Luna de España, each overseeing respective vessels within the formation.
- The Right Division to the south consisted of another 53 galleys (and 2 galleasses) under the Genoese Giovanni Andrea Doria, great-nephew of admiral Andrea Doria.
- A reserve division of 38 galleys was stationed behind (that is, to the west of) the main fleet, to lend support wherever it might be needed, commanded by Álvaro de Bazán, Marquis of Santa Cruz.

=== Turkish formation ===
The Ottoman fleet drew its own formation:

- 54 galleys and two galliots on its right under Mehmed Siroco.
- 88 galleys and eight galliots in the centre under Ali Pasha in the Sultana.
- 61 galleys and 32 galliots in the south offshore under Uluç Ali.
- A small reserve consisted of eight galleys and 21 galliots behind the centre body.

== Battle ==
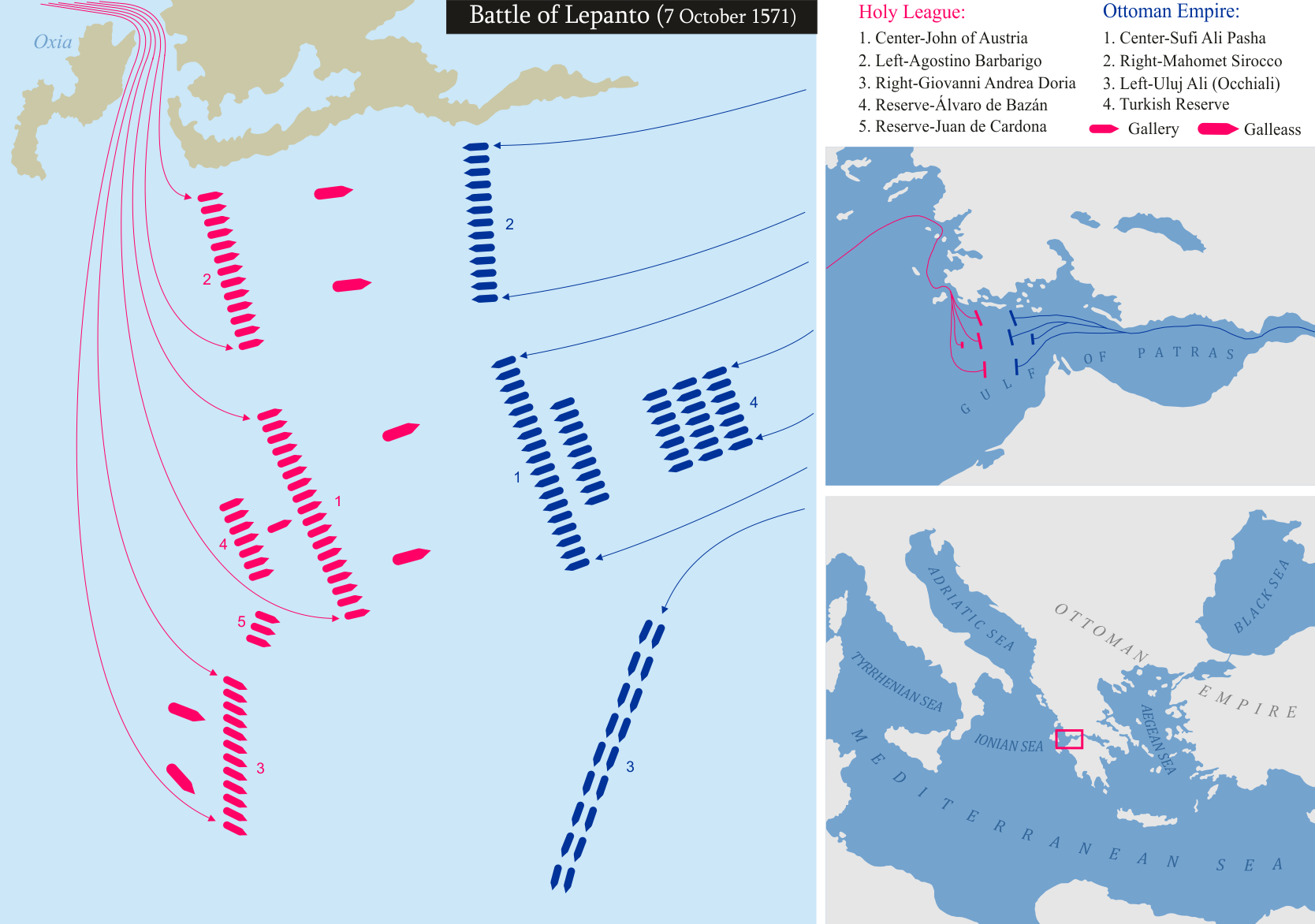
Plan of the Battle (formation of the fleets just before contact)

Preparing to give battle, John of Austria travelled through his fleet in a swift sailing vessel, exhorting his officers and men to do their utmost. The Sacrament was administered to all, the galley slaves were freed from their chains, and the standard of the Holy League was raised to the truck of the flagship.

The fleet of the Holy League consisted of 109 galleys and six galleasses from the Republic of Venice, 49 galleys from the Spanish Empire, 27 galleys from the Republic of Genoa, seven galleys from the Papal States, five galleys from the Order of Saint Stephen and the Grand Duchy of Tuscany, three galleys from the Duchy of Savoy, three galleys from the Knights of Malta and some private ships. There were also a total of 12 galleys from the Ionian Islands of Kefalonia, Corfu and Zakynthos. John of Austria, named overall commander of the fleet by Pope Pius V, led the centre division along with Papal captain Marcantonio Colonna and the Venetian Sebastiano Venier; the wings were commanded by the Venetian Agostino Barbarigo and the Genoese Gianandrea Doria. The Ottoman fleet consisted of 211 galleys and 63 galliots and was led by Müezzinzade Ali Pasha, Mahomet Sirocco and Occhiali.

The wind was at first against the Christians, and it was feared that the Turks would be able to make contact before a line of battle could be formed. But around noon, shortly before contact, the wind shifted to favour the Christians, enabling most of the squadrons to reach their assigned position before contact. Four galeasses stationed in front of the Christian battle line opened fire at close quarters at the foremost Turkish galleys, confusing their battle array in the crucial moment of contact. Around noon, first contact was made between the squadrons of Barbarigo and Sirocco, close to the northern shore of the Gulf. Barbarigo had attempted to stay so close to the shore as to prevent Sirocco from surrounding him, but Sirocco, knowing the depth of the waters, managed to still insert galleys between Barbarigo's line and the coast. In the ensuing mêlée, the ships came so close to each other as to form an almost continuous platform of hand-to-hand fighting. Barbarigo was killed by an arrow to the eye, but the timely arrival of Bazán with the reserve fleet balanced the situation, with Sirocco being eventually killed and beheaded. The Christian galley slaves freed from the Turkish ships were supplied with arms and joined in the fighting, turning the battle in favour of the Christian side.

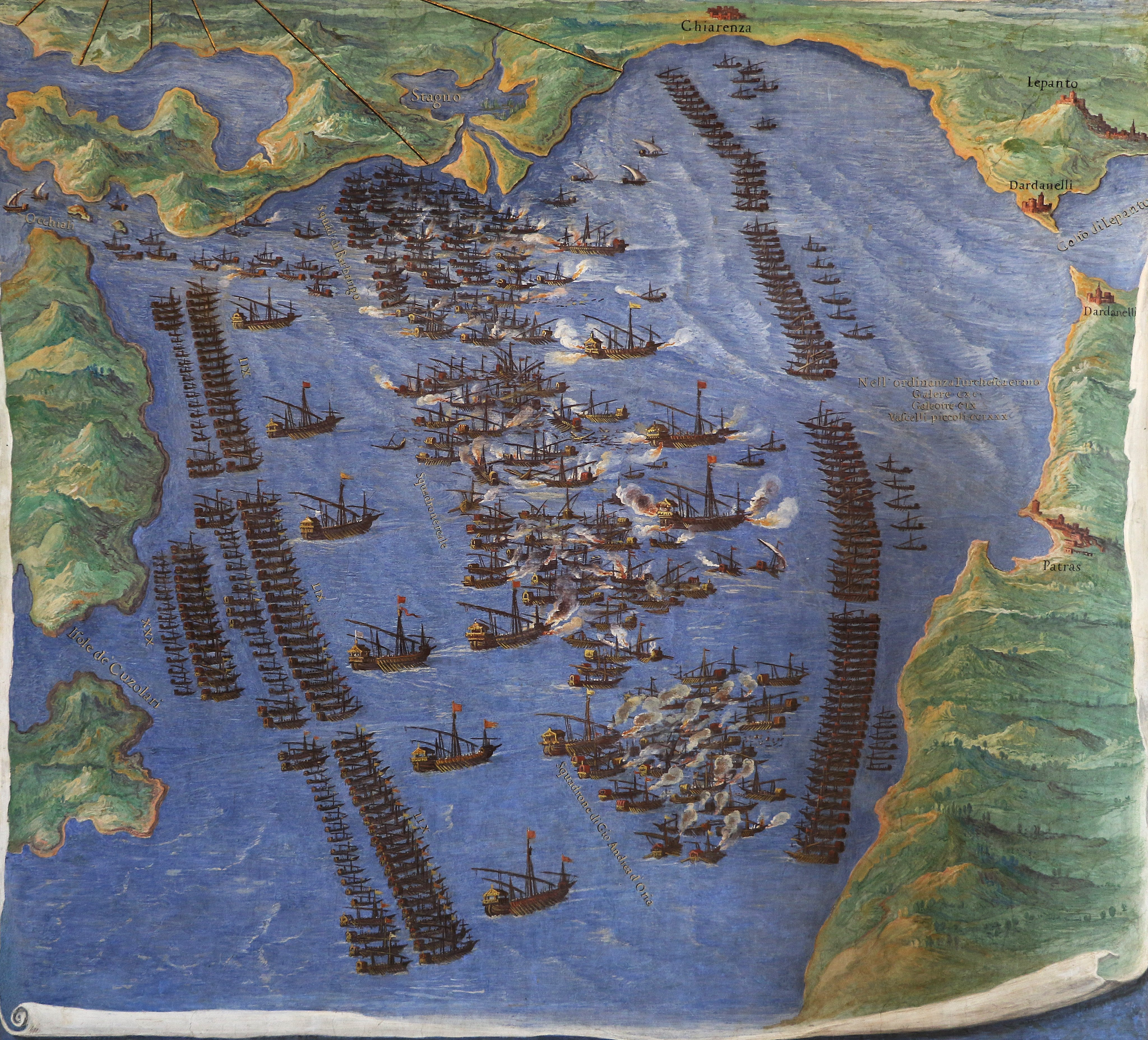
Fresco in the Vatican's Gallery of Maps

Meanwhile, the centres clashed with such force that Ali Pasha's galley drove into the Real as far as the fourth rowing bench, and hand-to-hand fighting commenced around the two flagships, between the Spanish Tercio infantry and the Turkish janissaries. When the Real was nearly taken, Colonna came alongside, with the bow of his galley, and mounted a counter-attack. With the help of Colonna, the Turks were pushed off the Real and the Turkish flagship was boarded and swept. The flagship's entire crew was killed, including Ali Pasha himself. The banner of the Holy League was hoisted on the captured ship, breaking the morale of the Turkish galleys nearby. After two hours of fighting, the Turks were beaten left and centre, although fighting continued for another two hours. A flag taken at Lepanto by the Knights of Saint Stephen, said to be the standard of the Turkish commander, is still on display at Santo Stefano dei Cavalieri church, the seat of the Order in Pisa.

On the Christian right, the situation was different, as Doria continued sailing towards the south instead of taking his assigned position. He would explain his conduct after the battle by saying that he was trying to prevent an enveloping manoeuvre by the Turkish left. But Doria's captains were enraged, interpreting their commander's signals as a sign of treachery. When Doria had opened a wide gap with the Christian centre, Uluç Ali swung around and fell on Colonna's southern flank, with Doria too far away to interfere. Ali attacked a group of some fifteen galleys around the flagship of the Knights of Malta, threatening to break into the Christian centre and still turn the tide of the battle. This was prevented again by the arrival of the reserve squadron commanded by Bazán. Uluç Ali was forced to retreat, escaping the battle with the captured flag of the Knights of Malta.

Isolated fighting continued until the evening. Even after the battle had clearly turned against the Turks, groups of janissaries kept fighting to the last. It is said that at some point the Janissaries ran out of weapons and started throwing oranges and lemons at their Christian adversaries, leading to awkward scenes of laughter among the general misery of battle. Many Greek rowers serving on Turkish galleys managed to seize them with mutiny and deliver them in time to the Christian allies. At the end of the battle, the Christians had captured 117 galleys and sunk or destroyed some 83 other. Around ten thousand Turks were taken prisoner, and many thousands of Christian slaves were rescued. The Christian side suffered around 7,500 deaths, the Turkish side about 30,000. Other sources place the losses higher, with 10,000 Christians and 40,000 Ottomans dead. (Note: Nolan also states the battle being the deadliest in history up until 1915.)

== Aftermath ==
=== Following operations ===
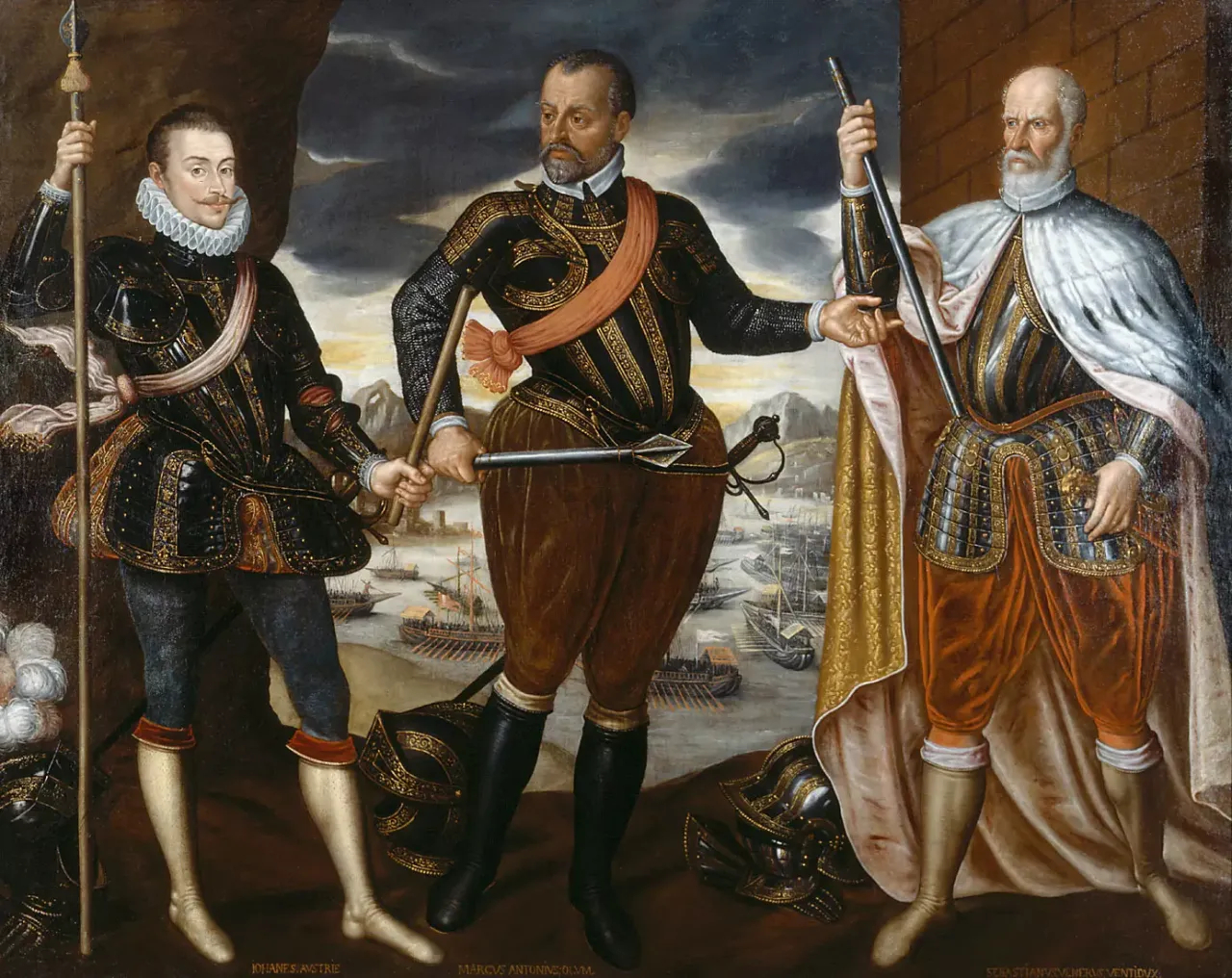
The Victors of Lepanto, John of Austria, Marcantonio Colonna and Sebastiano Venier (anonymous oil painting, c. 1575, formerly in Ambras Castle, now Kunsthistorisches Museum, Vienna)

The Ottomans were quick to rebuild their navy. About six months after the defeat, more than 150 galleys, 8 galleasses, and in total 250 ships had been built, including eight of the largest capital ships ever seen in the Mediterranean. Occhiali set off with 200 of the new ships in July 1572, eventually coming onto Marcantonio Colonna with 164 ships from the Holy League in the skirmish at Cerigo Channel. On August 4 Colonna looked for a battle in absence of John of Austria, arranging a line of twenty galleons and carracks and six galleasses to cover his outnumbered galleys, but Occhiali opted to withdraw after failing to outmaneuver them, not wanting to expose his fleet to their artillery. The Christians followed Occhiali to another brief clash in the channel on August 10, before Occhiali withdrew again with his left wing damaged.

The arrival of the Spanish squadron of 55 ships under John of Austria evened the numbers on both sides and opened the opportunity for a decisive blow. However, friction among the Christian leaders and the reluctance of John of Austria squandered the opportunity, and the subsequent attack on Occhiali's positions in Navarino was abandoned. This would be the last naval action of the Holy League.

With the death of Pius V on 1 May 1572, the diverging interests of the League members had begun to show, and the alliance now began to unravel. In 1573, the Holy League fleet failed to sail altogether; instead, John of Austria attacked and took Tunis. Venice, fearing the loss of its Dalmatian possessions and a possible invasion of Friuli, and eager to cut its losses and resume the trade with the Ottoman Empire, initiated unilateral negotiations with the Porte. The Holy League was disbanded with the peace treaty of 7 March 1573, which concluded the War of Cyprus. Venice was forced to accept loser's terms in spite of the victory at Lepanto. Cyprus was formally ceded to the Ottoman Empire, and Venice agreed to pay an indemnity of 300,000 ducats. In addition, the border between the two powers in Dalmatia was modified by the Turkish occupation of small but important parts of the hinterland that included the most fertile agricultural areas near the cities, with adverse effects on the economy of the Venetian cities in the region. Peace would hold between the two states until the Cretan War of 1645.

=== Consequences ===
The engagement was a significant defeat for the Ottomans, who had not lost a major naval battle since the fifteenth century. However, the Holy League failed to capitalize on the victory, and while the Ottoman defeat has often been cited as the historical turning-point initiating the eventual stagnation of Ottoman territorial expansion, this was by no means an immediate consequence. The Christian victory at Lepanto confirmed the de facto division of the Mediterranean, with the eastern half under firm Ottoman control and the western under the Spanish Crown and their Italian allies. The battle halted the Ottoman encroachment on Italian territories, but the Holy League did not regain any territories that had been lost to the Ottomans prior to Lepanto. Historian Paul K. Davis sums up the importance of Lepanto this way: "This Turkish defeat stopped Ottomans' expansion into the Mediterranean, thus maintaining Western dominance, and confidence grew in the West that Turks, previously unstoppable, could be beaten."

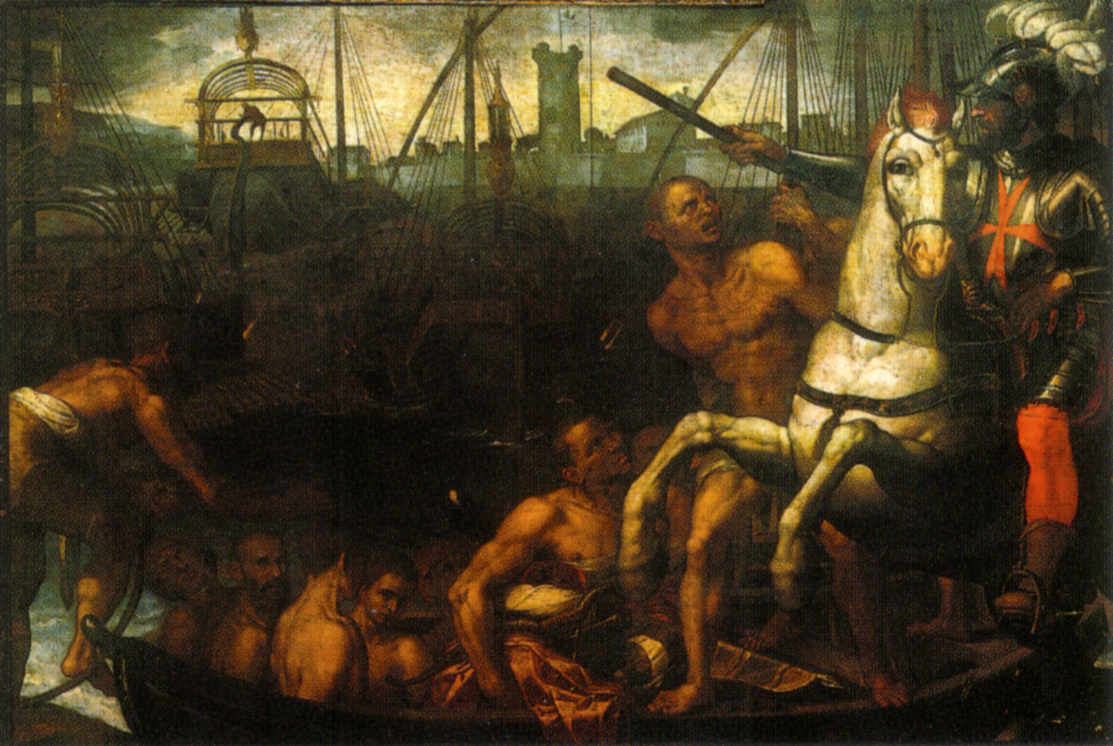
The Return of the Knights of Saint Stephen from the Battle of Lepanto, by Jacopo Ligozzi (c. 1610, Santo Stefano dei Cavalieri, Pisa).

With their rebuilt fleet the Ottoman Empire was able to reassert its supremacy in the Eastern Mediterranean. Sultan Selim II's Chief Minister, the Grand Vizier Sokollu Mehmed Pasha, even boasted to the Venetian emissary Marcantonio Barbaro that the Christian triumph at Lepanto caused no lasting harm to the Ottoman Empire, while the capture of Cyprus by the Ottomans in the same year was a significant blow, saying that:

You come to see how we bear our misfortune. But I would have you know the difference between your loss and ours. In wrestling Cyprus from you, we deprived you of an arm; in defeating our fleet, you have only shaved our beard. An arm when cut off cannot grow again; but a shorn beard will grow all the better for the razor.

In 1574, the Ottomans retook the strategic city of Tunis from the Spanish-supported Hafsid dynasty, which had been re-installed after John of Austria's forces reconquered the city from the Ottomans the year before. Thanks to the long-standing Franco-Ottoman alliance, the Ottomans were able to resume naval activity in the western Mediterranean. In 1576, the Ottomans assisted in Abdul Malik's capture of Fez – this reinforced the Ottoman indirect conquests in Morocco that had begun under Suleiman the Magnificent. The establishment of Ottoman suzerainty over the area placed the entire southern coast of the Mediterranean from the Straits of Gibraltar to Greece under Ottoman authority, with the exceptions of the Spanish-controlled trading city of Oran and strategic settlements such as Melilla and Ceuta. However, the loss of many experienced crews in Lepanto, including specialists difficult to replace, would make maritime ventures increasingly difficult and distasted in the Ottoman court after 1580.

A new factor emerged by the 1600s with the further development of western galleon tactics, after which the Ottoman Empire could no longer compete with the advance of European navies. Galleons were first deployed to destroy the Tunisian fleet in the raid on La Goulette of 1609, hailed back then as the biggest blow dealt to the Ottoman corsairs since Lepanto. It would be further demonstrated in the battle of Cape Gelidonya in 1616, also regarded as a "little Lepanto", where only six Spanish sailing ships under Francisco de Ribera defeated 55 Ottoman galleys near the Turkish coast. However, with Spain and the Ottoman Empire having turned their attention away from each other due to various conflicts, mainstream battles in the Mediterranean became largely confined to the following Ottoman–Venetian wars, which would start again in 1645 and end in 1715. Barbary corsairs would also continue living off the Barbary slave trade in low scale raids against western coasts until being uprooted in the 19th century.

== Legacy ==
=== Commemoration ===
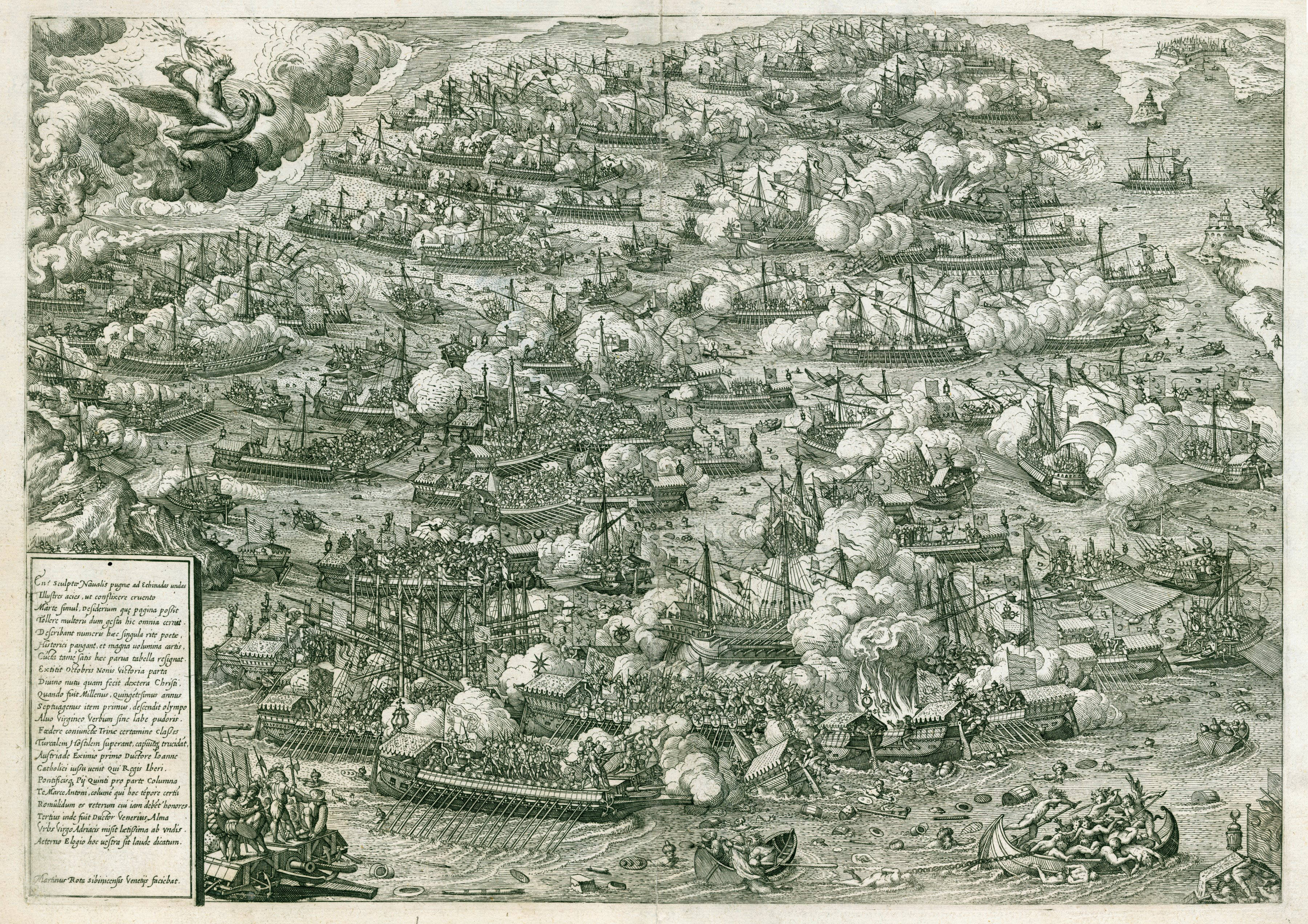
Battle of Lepanto by Martin Rota, 1572 print, Venice

The Holy League credited the victory to the Virgin Mary, whose intercession with God they had implored for victory through the use of the Rosary. Andrea Doria had kept a copy of the miraculous image of Our Lady of Guadalupe given to him by King Philip II of Spain in his ship's state room. This image is kept at the Shrine of Our Lady of Guadalupe in Santo Stefano d'Aveto, Italy. Pope Pius V instituted a new Catholic feast day of Our Lady of Victory to commemorate the battle, which is now celebrated by the Catholic Church as the feast of Our Lady of the Rosary. Dominican friar Juan Lopez in his 1584 book on the rosary states that the feast of the rosary was offered "in memory and in perpetual gratitude of the miraculous victory that the Lord gave to his Christian people that day against the Turkish armada". Greek Orthodox Christians living in Nafpaktos (Lepanto) credit the victory to the Panagia Nafpaktiotissa.

A piece of commemorative music composed after the victory is the motet Canticum Moysis (Song of Moses Exodus 15) Pro victoria navali contra Turcas by the Spanish composer based in Rome Fernando de las Infantas. The other piece of music is Jacobus de Kerle's "Cantio octo vocum de sacro foedere contra Turcas" 1572 (Song in Eight Voices on the Holy League Against the Turks), in the opinion of Pettitt (2006) an "exuberantly militaristic" piece celebrating the victory. There were celebrations and festivities with triumphs and pageants at Rome and Venice with Turkish slaves in chains.

=== Accounts ===
Giovanni Pietro Contarini's History of the Events, which occurred from the Beginning of the War Brought against the Venetians by Selim the Ottoman, to the Day of the Great and Victorious Battle against the Turks was published in 1572, a few months after Lepanto. It was the first comprehensive account of the war, and the only one to attempt a concise but complete overview of its course and the Holy League's triumph. Contarini's account went beyond effusive praise and mere factual reporting to examine the meaning and importance of these events. It is also the only full historical account by an immediate commentator, blending his straightforward narrative with keen and consistent reflections on the political philosophy of conflict in the context of the Ottoman–Catholic confrontation in the early modern Mediterranean.

=== Paintings ===
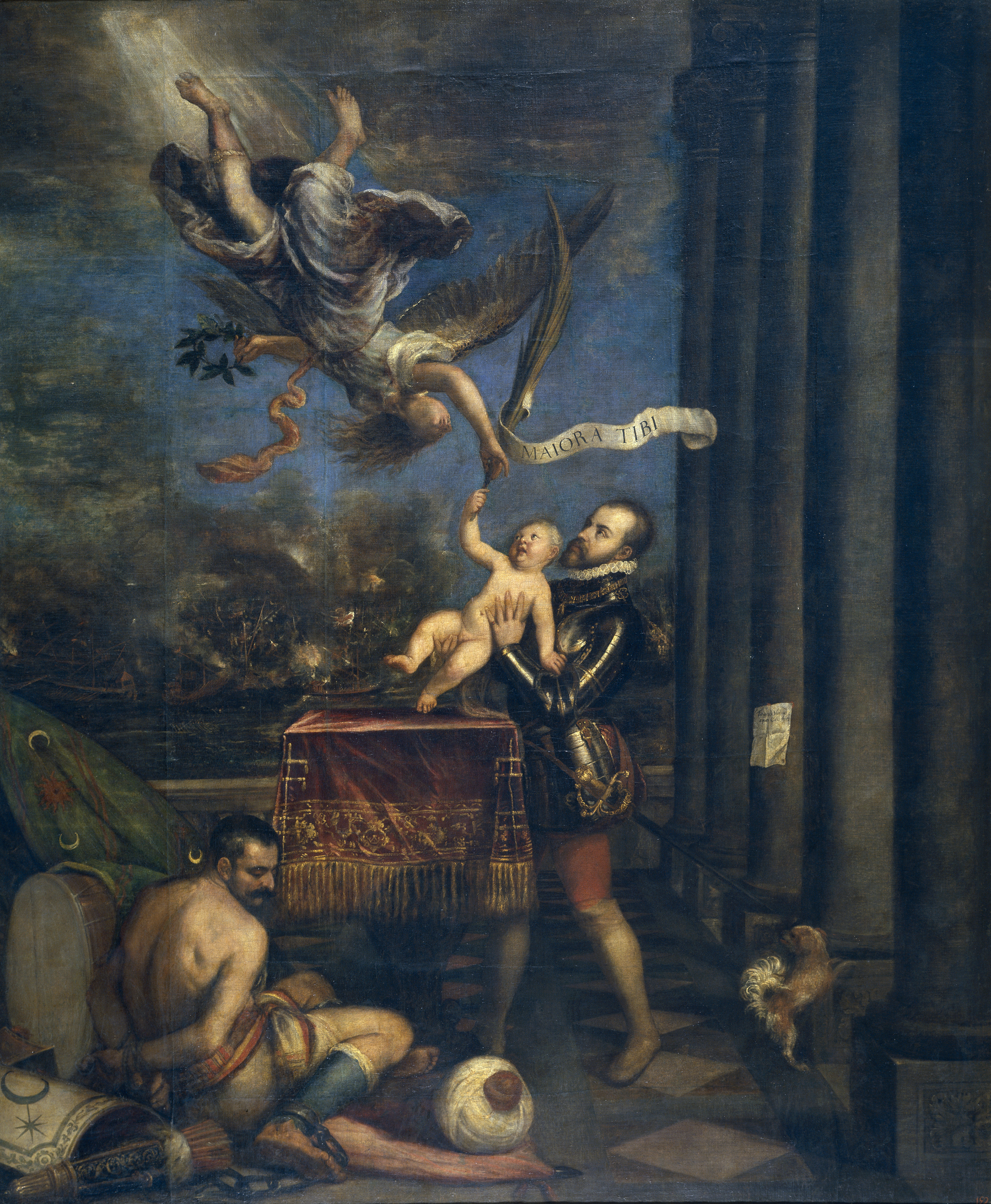
Felipe II offers Prince Fernando to Victory by Titian, c. 1572–1575, Museo del Prado, Madrid

There are many pictorial representations of the battle. Prints of the order of battle appeared in Venice and Rome in 1571. Numerous paintings were commissioned, including one in the Doge's Palace, Venice, by Andrea Vicentino on the walls of the Sala dello Scrutinio, which replaced Tintoretto's Victory of Lepanto, destroyed by fire in 1577. Titian painted the battle in the background of an allegorical work showing Philip II of Spain holding his infant son, Don Fernando, his male heir born shortly after the victory, on 4 December 1571. An angel descends from heaven bearing a palm branch with a motto for Fernando, who is held up by Philip: "Majora tibi" (may you achieve greater deeds; Fernando died as a child, in 1578).

The Allegory of the Battle of Lepanto (c. 1572, oil on canvas, 169 x 137 cm, Gallerie dell'Accademia, Venice) is a painting by Paolo Veronese. The lower half of the painting shows the events of the battle, whilst at the top a female personification of Venice is presented to the Virgin Mary, with Saint James Major (patron of Spain), Saint Peter (patron of the Papal States), Saint Justina (patron of Padua), Saint Mark (patron of Venice), and a group of angels in attendance.

A painting by Wenceslas Cobergher, dated to the end of the 16th century, now in San Domenico Maggiore, shows what is interpreted as a victory procession in Rome on the return of admiral Colonna. On the stairs of Saint Peter's Basilica, Pius V is visible in front of a kneeling figure, identified as Marcantonio Colonna returning the standard of the Holy League to the pope. On high is the Madonna and child with victory palms.

Tommaso Dolabella painted his The Battle of Lepanto in c. 1625–1630 on the commission of Stanisław Lubomirski, commander of the Polish left wing in the Battle of Khotyn (1621). The monumental painting (3.05 m × 6.35 m) combines the Polish victory procession following this battle with the backdrop of the Battle of Lepanto. It was later owned by the Dominicans of Poznań and since 1927 has been on display in Wawel Castle, Kraków.

The Battle of Lepanto by Juan Luna (1887) is displayed at the Spanish Senate in Madrid.

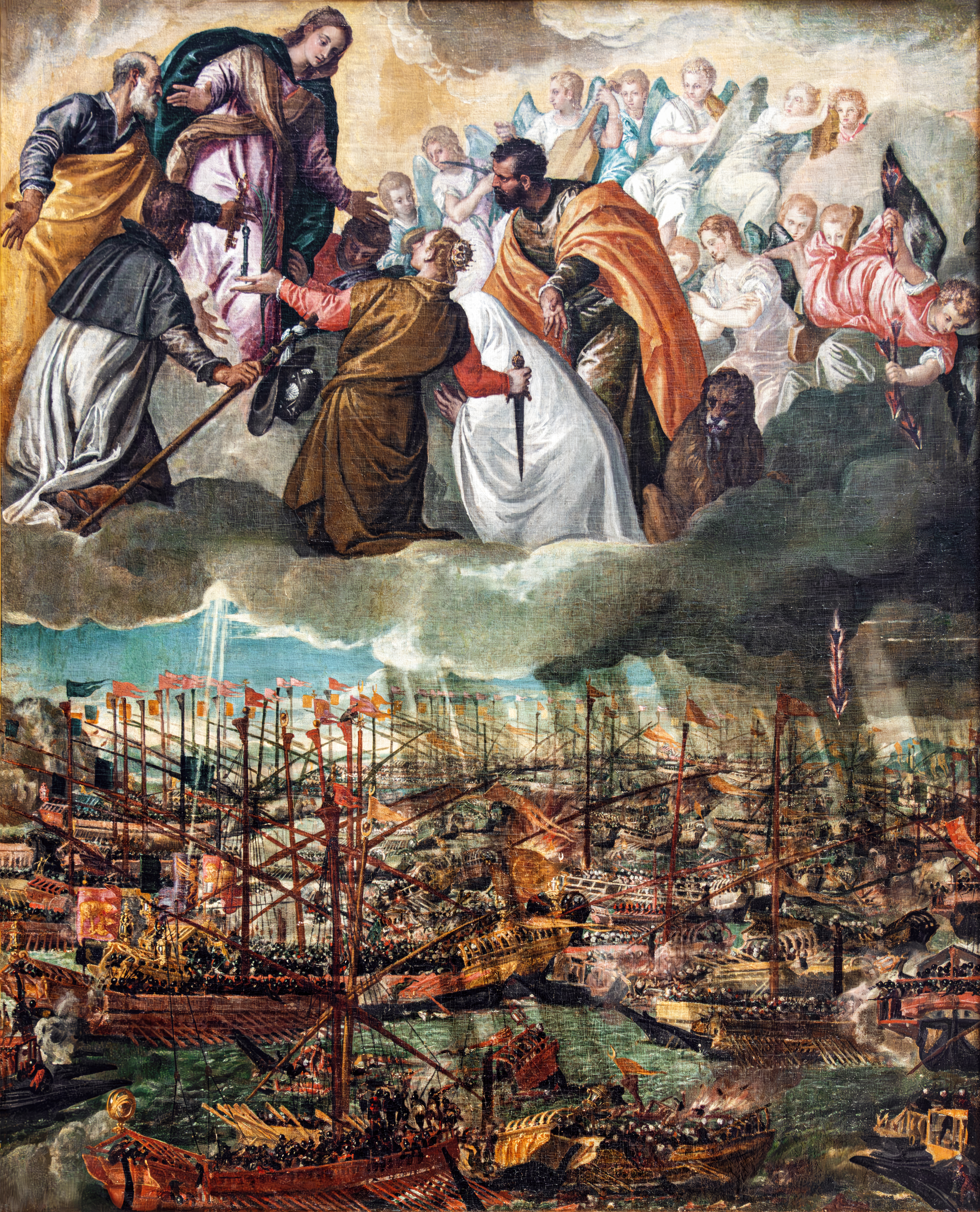
The Allegory of the Battle of Lepanto by Paolo Veronese (c. 1572, Gallerie dell'Accademia, Venice

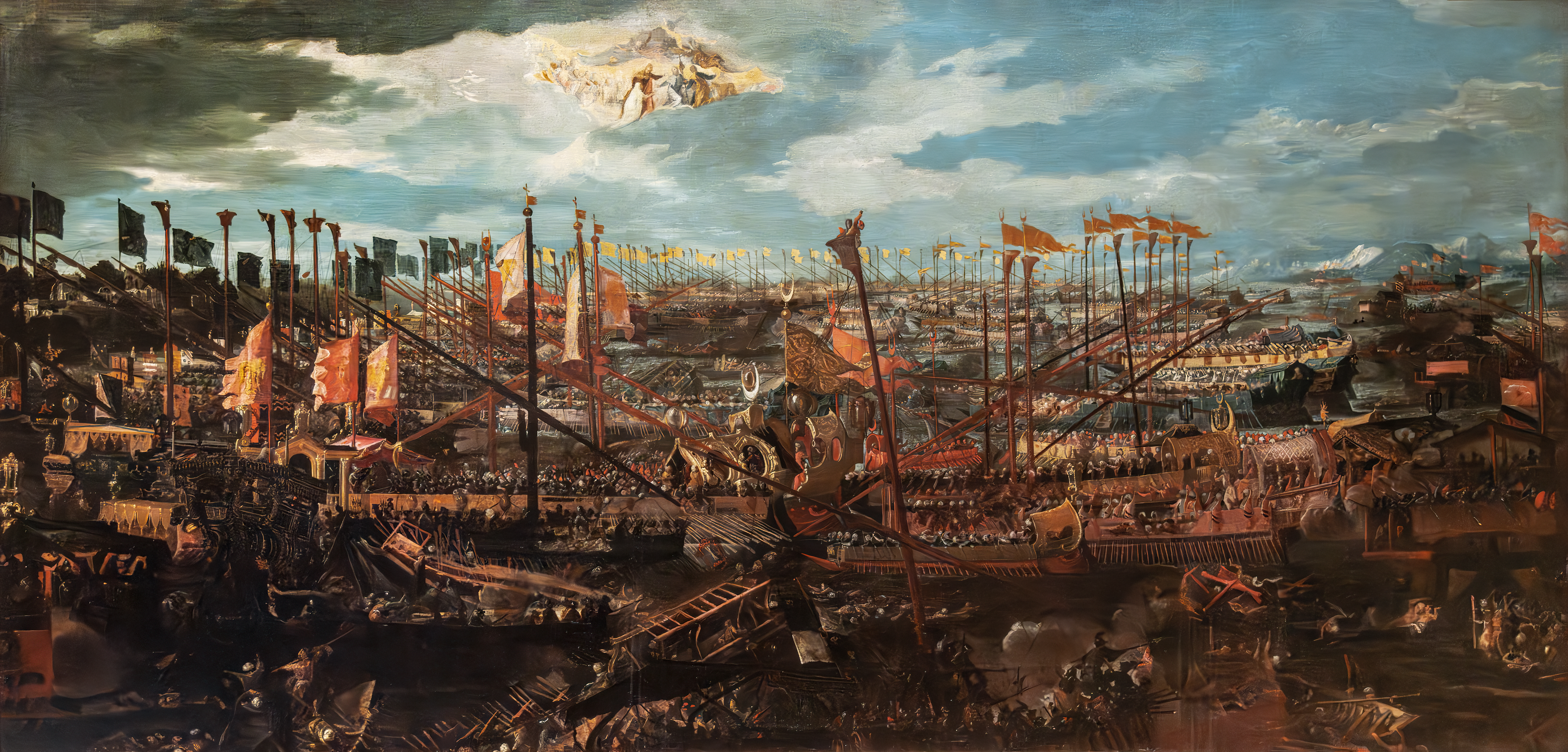
The Battle of Lepanto by Andrea Vicentino (c. 1571–1600), Museo Correr, Venice

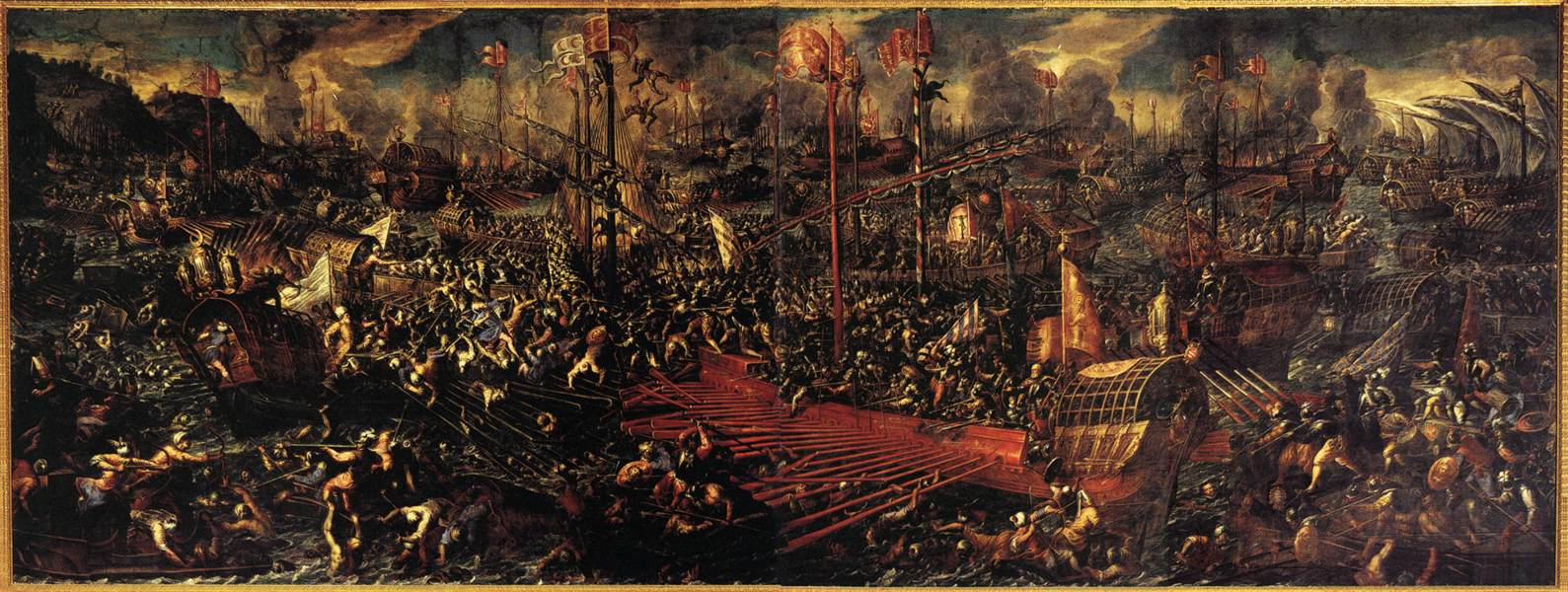
The Battle of Lepanto by Andrea Vicentino (c. 1600, Doge's Palace, Venice)

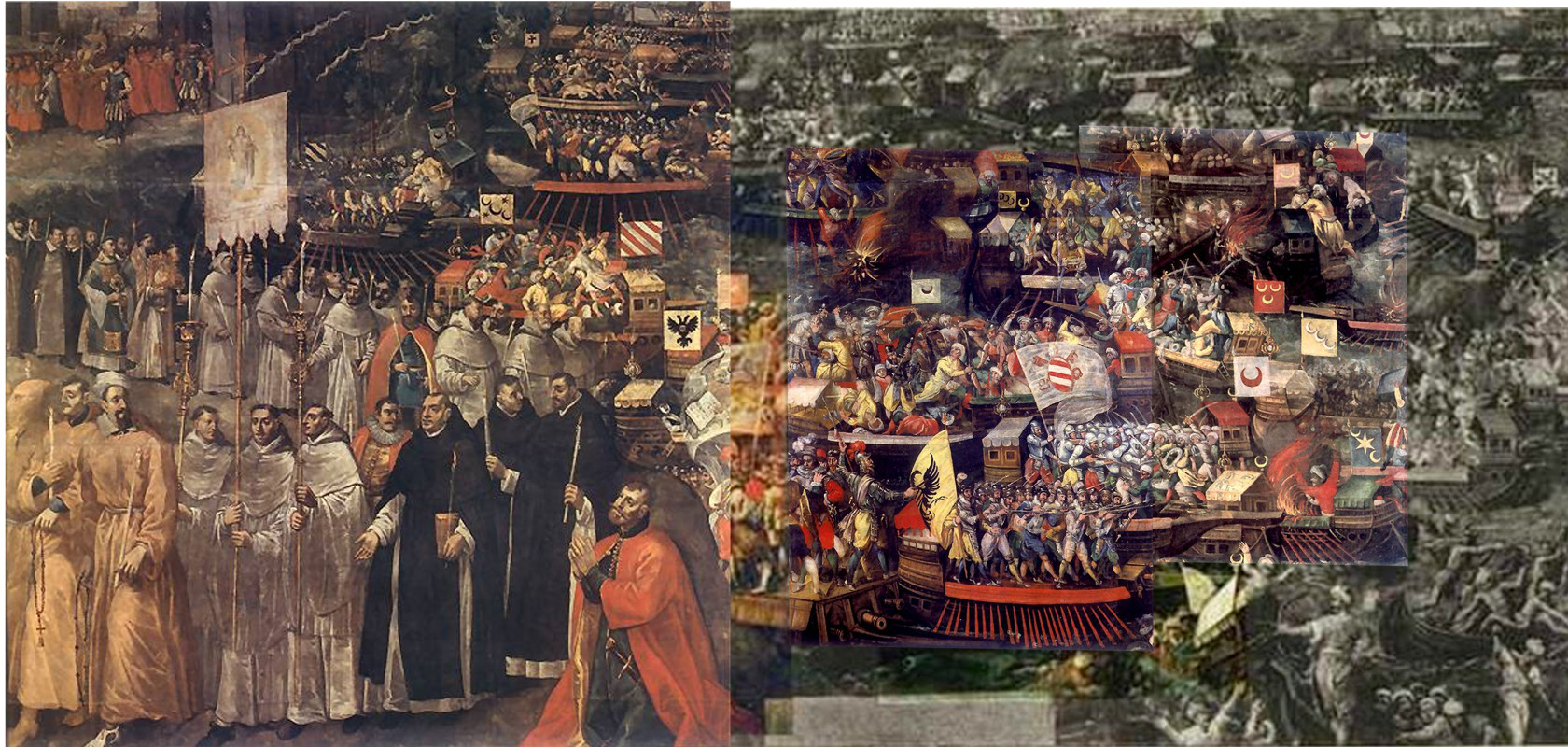
The Battle of Lepanto by Tommaso Dolabella (c. 1625–1630, Wawel Castle, Kraków)

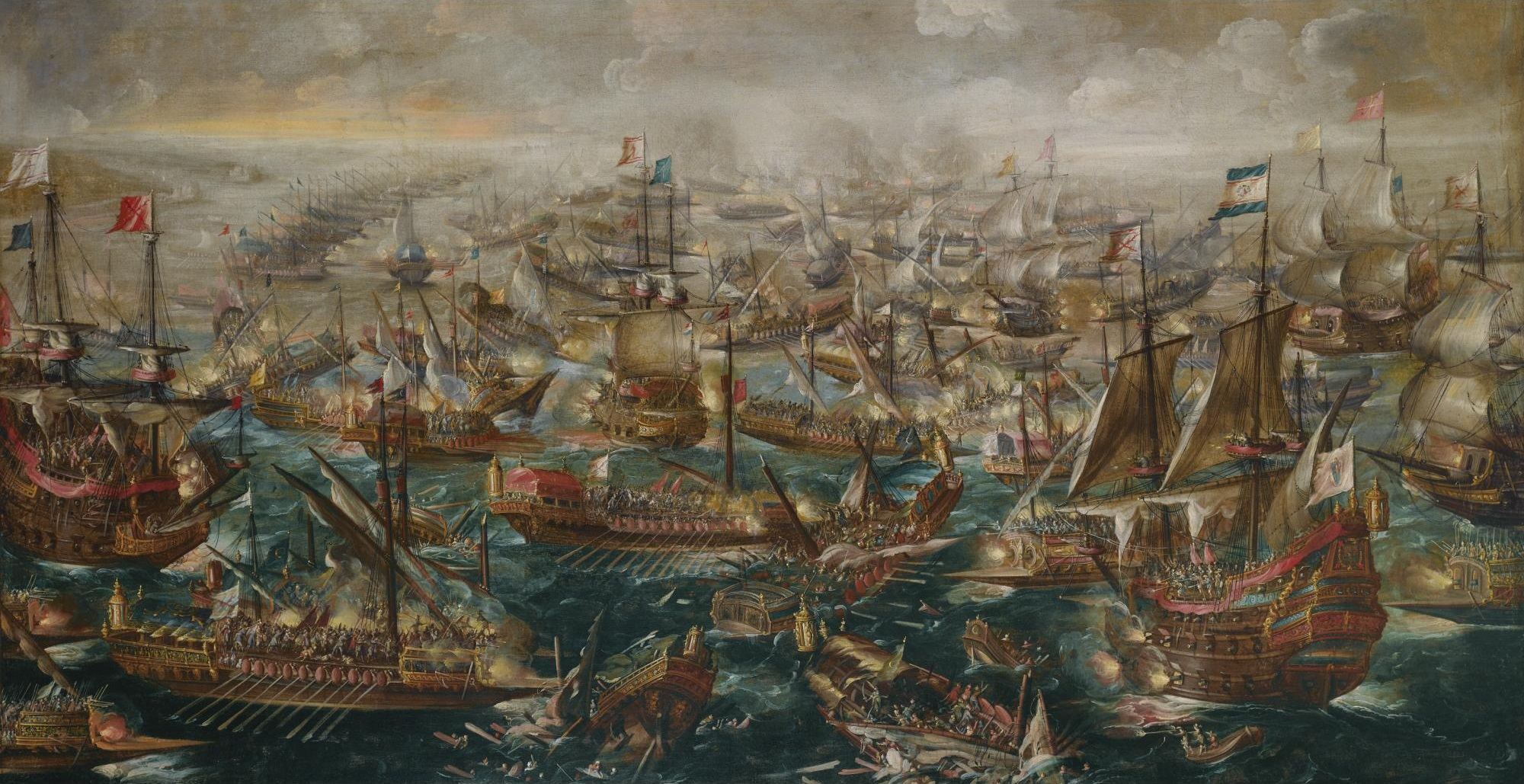
The Battle of Lepanto by Andries van Eertvelt (1640)

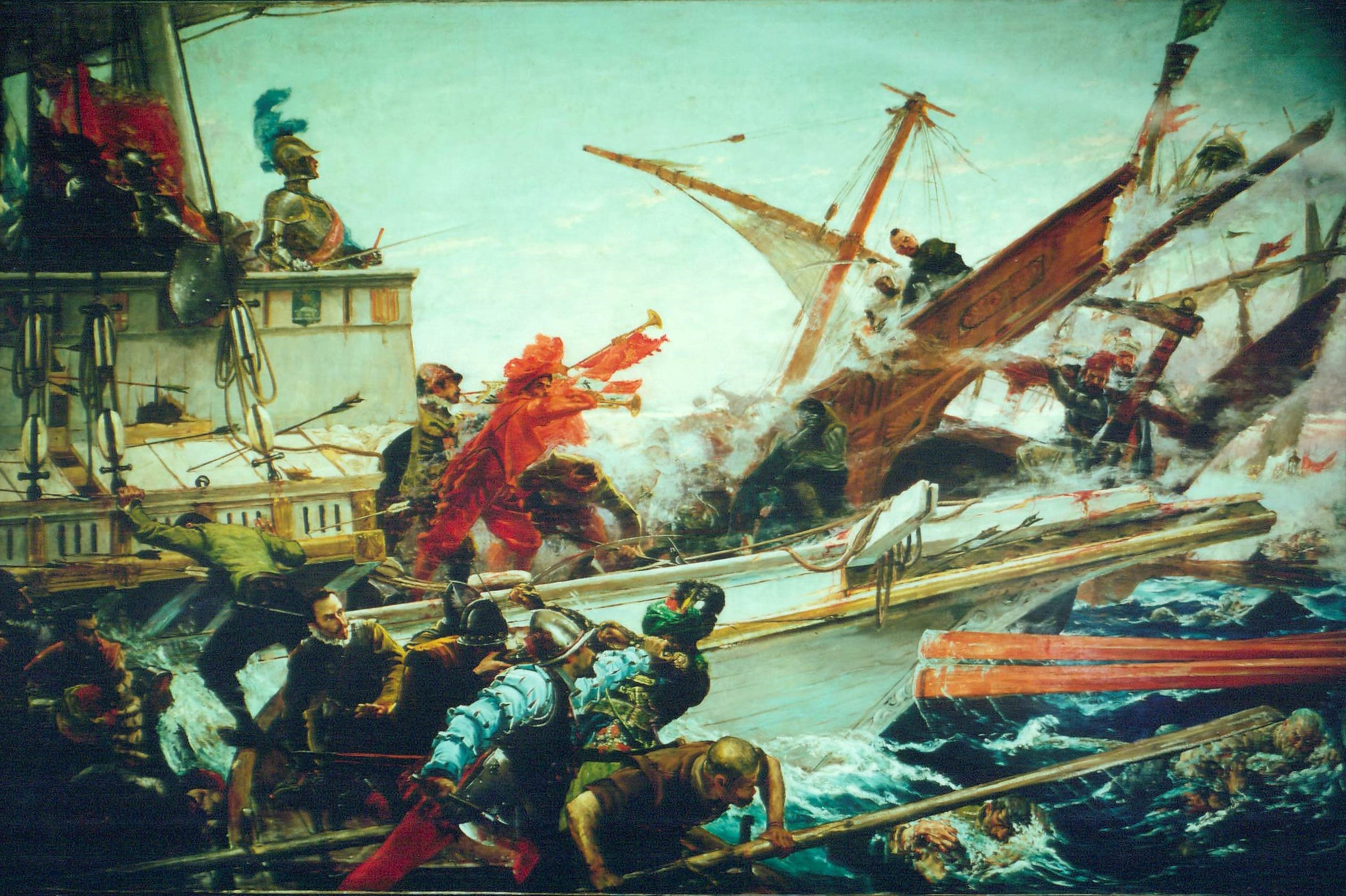
The Battle of Lepanto by Juan Luna (1887, Spanish Senate, Madrid)

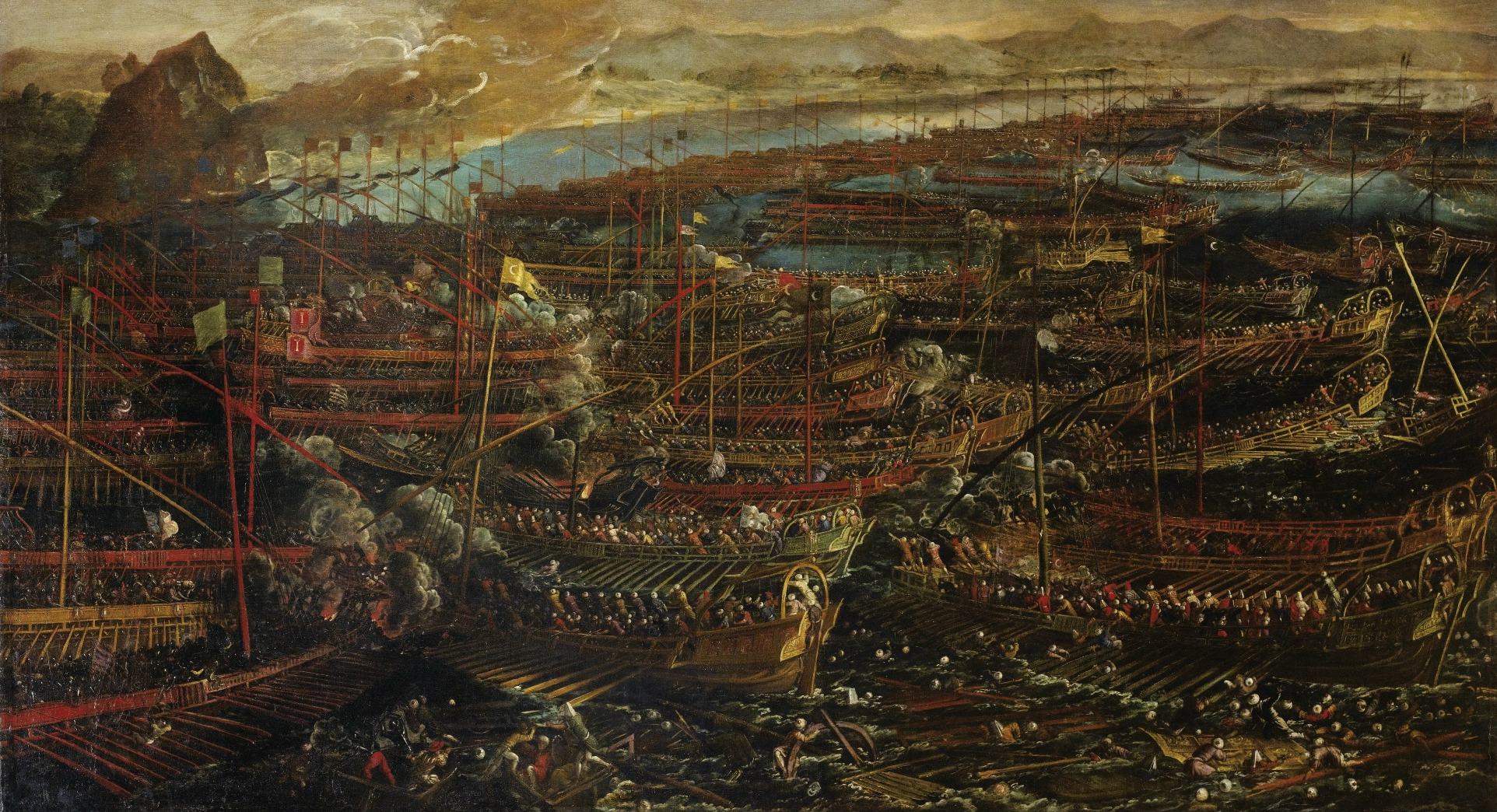
The Battle of Lepanto by Tintoretto

The Battle of Lepanto by anonymous

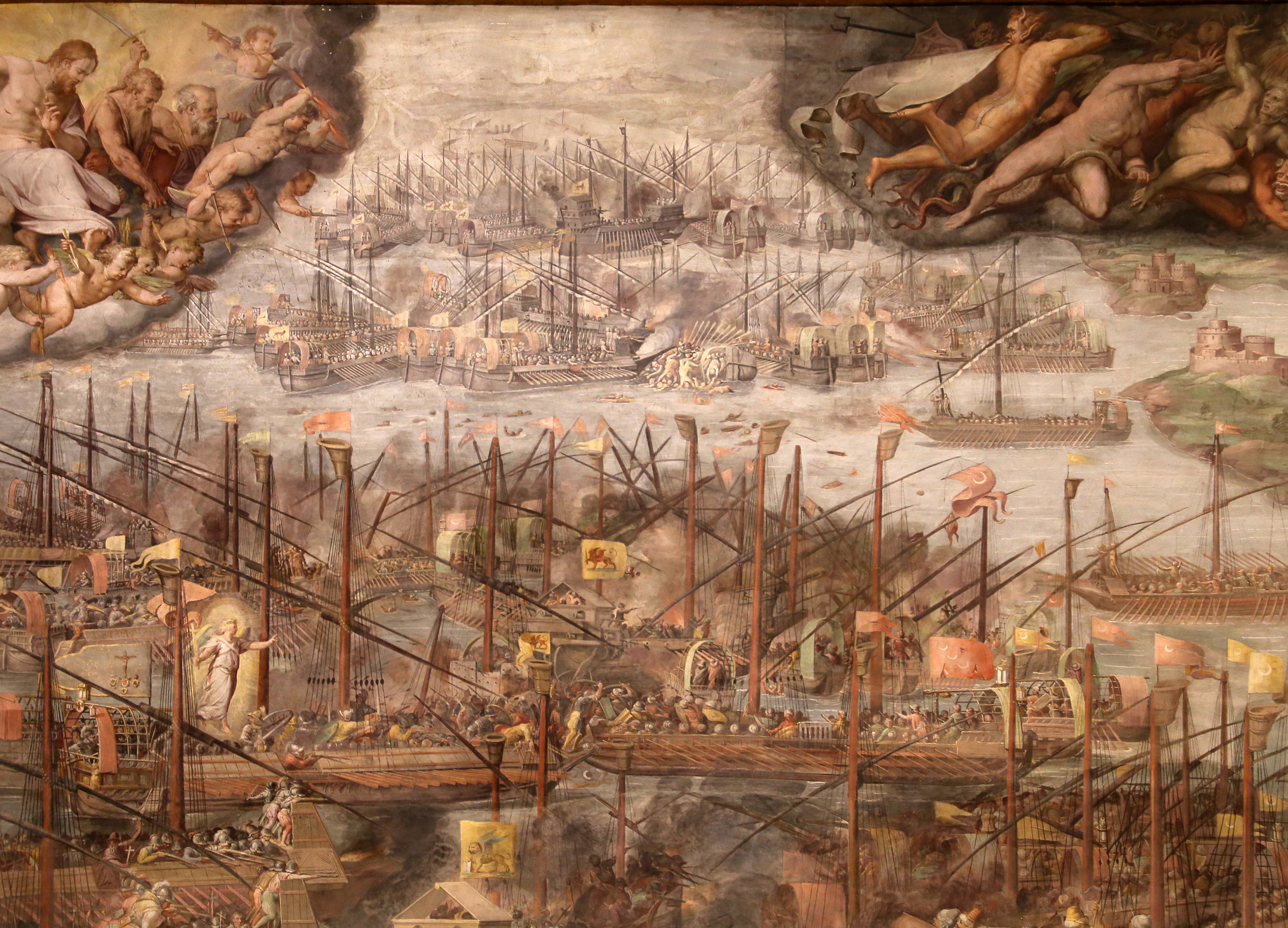
The Battle of Lepanto by Giorgio Vasari

=== Sculpture ===
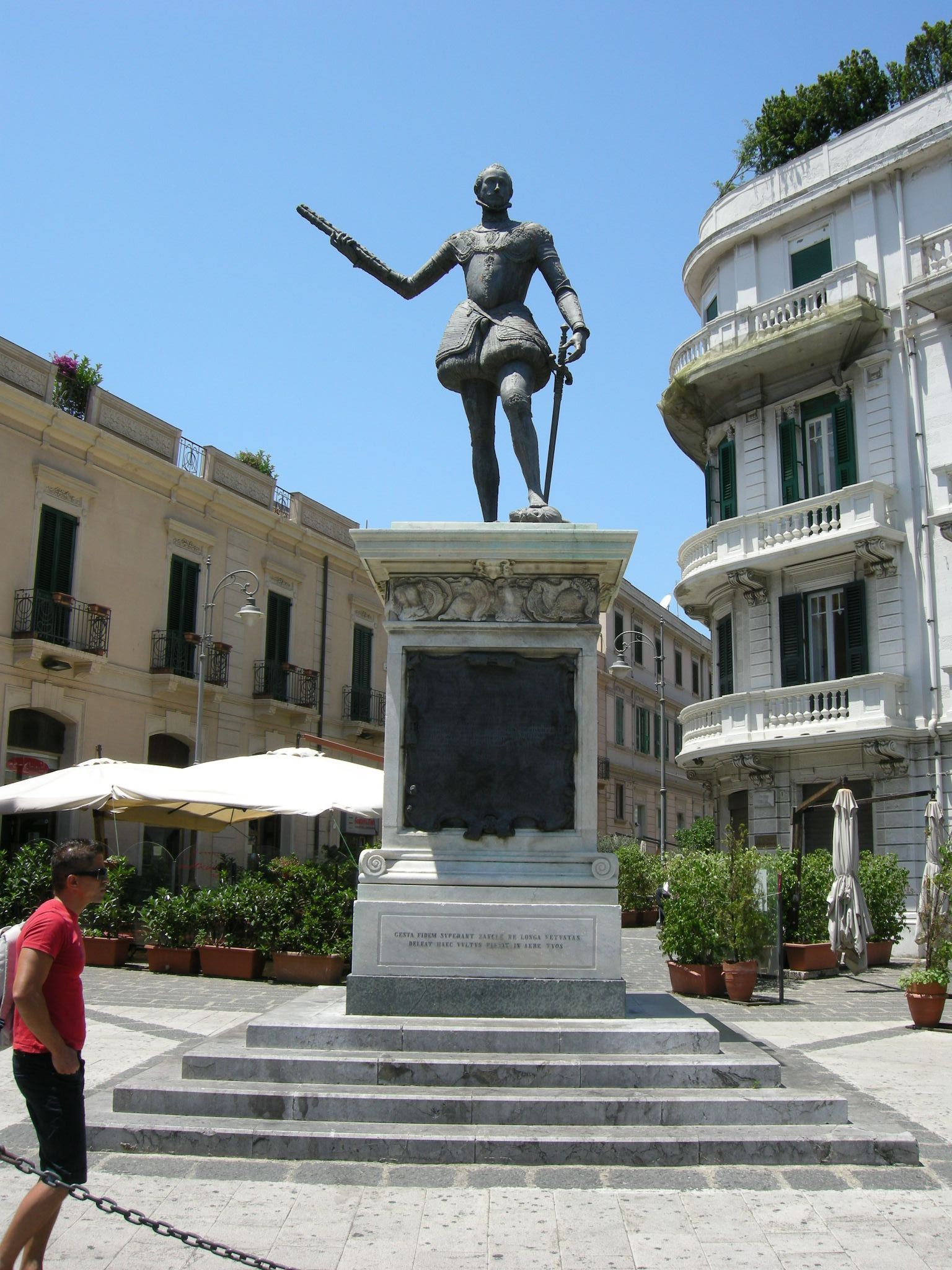
Monument to John of Austria in Messina

The statue of John of Austria in Messina was erected by decision of the city's Senate in 1571, as John had returned to Messina after the battle. It was sculpted by Andrea Calamech and dedicated in 1572.

=== Poetry and fiction ===
There was an immediate poetical response to the victory at Lepanto. In Italy alone 233 titles of sonnets, madrigals and poems were printed between 1571 and 1573, some of these including writing in dialect or Latin.

This was replicated by the Spanish response, with poems in Catalan and the Mallorcan dialect and full scale epics by Juan Latino (Austriados libri duo 1573), Jerónimo Corte-Real ( Austriada ou Felicissima Victoria, 1578) and es:Juan Rufo (La Austriada, 1586). Though these longer works have, in the words of a later critic, "not unjustly been consigned to that oblivion which few epics have escaped", there was also a Spanish ballad which retained its popularity and was translated into English by Thomas Rodd in 1818.

The most popular British poem on the subject was The Lepanto by King James VI of Scotland. Written in fourteeners about 1585, its thousand lines were ultimately collected in His Maiesties Poeticall Exercises at Vacant Houres (1591), then published separately in 1603 after James had become king of England too. There were also translations in other languages, including into Dutch as Den Slach van Lepanten (1593) by Abraham van der Myl, La Lepanthe, the French version by Du Bartas, accompanied James' 1591 edition; a Latin version, the Naupactiados Metaphrasis by Thomas Murray (1564–1623), followed a year after James' 1603 publication.

The royal connection ensured that the battle was featured in Stuart aquatic pageants representing sea battles between Christians and Turks well into the reign. In 1632, the story of the battle was retold in couplets in Abraham Holland's Naumachia.

Centuries later G. K. Chesterton revisited the conflict in his lively narrative poem Lepanto, first published in 1911 and republished many times since. It provided a series of poetic visions of the major characters in the battle, particularly the leader of the Christian forces, John of Austria, then closed with verses linking Miguel de Cervantes, who also fought in the battle, with the "lean and foolish knight" he would later immortalise in Don Quixote.

At the start of the 20th century too, Emilio Salgari devoted his historical novel, Il Leone di Damasco ("The Lion of Damascus", 1910), to the Battle of Lepanto, which was eventually to be adapted to film by Corrado D'Errico in 1942.

In 1942 as well, English author Elizabeth Goudge has a character in her war-time novel, The Castle on the Hill (1942), recall the leading role of John of Austria in the battle and the presence of Cervantes there. Much as combatants had appropriated Chesterton's poem to the circumstances of World War I, Goudge harnessed that ancient incident to British resistance to Nazi Germany during World War II.

== See also ==
- Papal Navy – Navy of the Papal States (c. 843–1870)
- Battle of Zonchio – 1499 naval battle of the Ottoman–Venetian War
- Battle of Preveza – 1538 battle of the Third Ottoman–Venetian War
- Battle of Djerba – 1560 naval battle
- Siege of Malta – Ottoman Empire's invasion of Malta in 1565
- Battle of Cape Gelidonya – 1616 Ottoman–Habsburg naval battle
- "Lepanto" – 1915 poem by G. K. Chesterton

== Bibliography ==
- Abulafia, David (2012). The Great Sea: A Human History of the Mediterranean. New York: Penguin Books. ISBN 978-0-19931-599-4.
- Anderson, Roger Charles (1952). Naval wars in the Levant, 1559-1853. Princeton University Press.
- Archer, Christon; Ferris, John R.; Herwig, Holger H.; Travers, Timothy H.E. (2002). World History of Warfare. Lincoln: University of Nebraska Press. ISBN 978-0-80321-941-0.
- Beeching, Jack (1982). The Galleys at Lepanto. London: Hutchingson. ISBN 0-09-147920-7.
- Bicheno, Hugh (2004). Crescent and Cross: The Battle of Lepanto 1571. London: Phoenix. ISBN 1-84212-753-5.
- Braudel, Fernand. The Mediterranean in the Age of Philip II. (vol 2 1972), the classic history by the leader of the French Annales School; excerpt and text search vol 2 pp 1088–1142
- Brewer, David (2012). Greece, the Hidden Centuries: Turkish Rule from the Fall of Constantinople to Greek Independence. Bloomsbury Publishing. p. 92. ISBN 978-0-85772-167-9.
- Capponi, Niccolò (2006). Victory of the West:The Great Christian-Muslim Clash at the Battle of Lepanto. New York: Da Capo Press. ISBN 0-306-81544-3.
- Chesterton, G. K. Lepanto with Explanatory Notes and Commentary, Dale Ahlquist, ed. (San Francisco: Ignatius Press, 2003). ISBN 1-58617-030-9
- Clissold, Stephen (1966). A short history of Yugoslavia. Cambridge: Cambridge University Press. ISBN 0-521-04676-9.
- Clodfelter, Micheal (2017). Warfare and Armed Conflicts: A Statistical Encyclopedia of Casualty and Other Figures, 1492-2015 (4 ed.). McFarland & Company. ISBN 978-0786474707.
- Cakir, İbrahim Etem, "Lepanto War and Some Informatıon on the Reconstructıon of The Ottoman Fleet", Turkish Studies – International Periodical For The Language Literature and History of Turkish or Turkic, Volume 4/3 Spring 2009, pp. 512–31
- Check, Christopher (March 2007). "The Battle that Saved the Christian West". This Rock. Vol. 18, no. 3. Catholic Answers. Archived from the original on 28 November 2016.
- Contarini, Giovanni Pietro. Kiril Petkov, ed and trans. From Cyprus to Lepanto: History of the Events, Which Occurred from the Beginning of the War Brought against the Venetians by Selim the Ottoman, to the Day of the Great and Victorious Battle against the Turks. Italica Press, 2019. ISBN 978-1-59910-381-5 ISBN 978-1-59910-382-2
- Cook, M.A. (ed.), "A History of the Ottoman Empire to 1730", Cambridge University Press, 1976; ISBN 0-521-20891-2
- Corbett, Julian (2007). England in the Mediterranean: A Study of the Rise and Influence of British Power Within the Straits, 1603-1713. Cosimo. ISBN 9781602062672.
- Crowley, Roger (2008). Empires of the Sea: The siege of Malta, the battle of Lepanto and the contest for the center of the world. Random House. ISBN 978-1-4000-6624-7.
- Currey, Hamilton (1910). Sea-Wolves of the Mediterranean. John Murrey.
- Davis, Paul K. (1999). 100 Decisive Battles: From Ancient Times to the Present. New York: Oxford University Press. ISBN 978-0-19514-366-9.
- Davis, Robert C. (2009). Holy War and Human Bondage. Santa Barbara: ABC-CLIO. ISBN 978-0-27598-950-7.
- Fernández Duro, Cesáreo (1896). Armada Española, desde la unión de los reinos de Castilla y Aragón, tomo II. Madrid: Instituto de Historia Naval.
- Finkel, Caroline (2006). Osman's Dream: The Story of the Ottoman Empire 1300–1923. London: John Murray. p. 161.
- George-Tvrtković, Rita (2020). "Our Lady of Victory or Our Lady of Beauty?: The Virgin Mary in Early Modern Dominican and Jesuit Approaches to Islam". Journal of Jesuit Studies. 7 (3): 403–416. doi:10.1163/22141332-00703003.
- Guilmartin, John F. (1974). Gunpowder & Galleys: Changing Technology & Mediterranean Warfare at Sea in the 16th Century. Cambridge University Press. ISBN 0-521-20272-8.
- Guilmartin, John F. (2003). Galleons and Galleys: Gunpowder and the Changing Face of Warfare at Sea, 1300–1650. Cassell. ISBN 0-304-35263-2.
- Hanson, Victor D. Carnage and Culture: Landmark Battles in the Rise of Western Power, Anchor Books, 2001. Published in the UK as Why the West has Won, Faber and Faber, 2001. ISBN 0-571-21640-4. Includes a chapter about the battle of Lepanto
- Hanson, Victor Davis (2010). The Father of Us All: War and History, Ancient and Modern. New York: Bloomsbury Press. ISBN 978-1-60819-410-0.
- Hattendorf, John B., ed. (2013). Naval Policy and Strategy in the Mediterranean: Past, Present and Future. Frank Cass.
- Hess, Andrew C. "The Battle of Lepanto and Its Place in Mediterranean History", Past and Present, No. 57. (Nov., 1972), pp. 53–73
- Hopkins, T.C.F. (2006). Confrontation at Lepanto: Christendom vs. Islam. New York: Forge Books. ISBN 978-0-76530-539-8.
- Keegan, John (1993). A History of Warfare. Cambridge University Press. ISBN 0-521-47426-4.
- Konstam, Angus (2003). Lepanto 1571: The Greatest Naval Battle of the Renaissance. United Kingdom: Osprey Publishing. pp. 20–23. ISBN 1-84176-409-4.
- Korpas, Zoltan (2022). "History is Written by Victorious Battles: Glorious Lepanto (1571) and Forgotten Preveza (1538)". Turkish Journal of History (76). Istanbul University: 63–94. doi:10.26650/iutd.202204.
- Stevens, William Oliver; Westcott, Alan F. (1942). A History of Sea Power. Doubleday.
- Harbottle's Dictionary of Battles, third revision by George Bruce, 1979
- Parker, Geoffrey (1996). The Military Revolution: Military Innovation and the Rise of the West, 1500–1800. Cambridge University Press. ISBN 0-521-47426-4.
- Rodríguez González, Agustín Ramón (2021). Lepanto, la batalla decisiva (in Spanish). Spain: Sekotia Ediciones. ISBN 978-84-1675-090-0.
- Setton, Kenneth M. (1984). The Papacy and the Levant (1204–1571), Vol. IV: The Sixteenth Century. Memoirs of the American Philosophical Society. pp. 1093–1095. ISBN 9780871691149.
- Spielvogel, Jackson J. (2012). Western Civilization: A Brief History, Volume II: Since 1500 (8th ed.). Cengage Learning. p. 253. ISBN 9781133607939.
- Stouraiti, Anastasia, 'Costruendo un luogo della memoria: Lepanto', Storia di Venezia – Rivista 1 (2003), 65–88.
- Tucker, Spencer C. (2010). "Battle of Lepanto". Battles that Changed History: An Encyclopedia of World Conflict. ABC-CLIO. pp. 175–178.
- Nolan, Cathal J. (2006). The Age of Wars of Religion, 1000-1650 [2 volumes]: An Encyclopedia of Global Warfare and Civilization. Greenwood Press. ISBN 978-0313330452.
- Warner, Oliver Great Sea Battles (1968) has "Lepanto 1571" as its opening chapter. ISBN 0-89673-100-6
- The New Cambridge Modern History, Volume I – The Renaissance 1493–1520, edited by G. R. Potter, Cambridge University Press 1964
- Wheatcroft, Andrew (2004). Infidels: A History of the Conflict between Christendom and Islam. Penguin Books.
- J. P. Jurien de la Gravière, La Guerre de Chypre et la Bataille de Lépante (1888).
- Luis Coloma, The Story of Don John of Austria, trans. Lady Moreton, New York: John Lane Company, 1912 (online transcription of pp. 265–71 Archived 2012-06-18 at the Wayback Machine).
- Lepanto – Rudolph, Harriet, "Die Ordnung der Schlacht und die Ordnung der Erinnerung" Archived 2020-11-16 at the Wayback Machine in: Militärische Erinnerungskulturen vom 14. bis zum 19. Jahrhundert (2012), 101–128.
- Guilmartin, John F. "The Tactics of the Battle of Lepanto Clarified: The Impact of Social, Economic, and Political Factors on Sixteenth Century Galley Warfare", in Craig L. Symonds (ed.), New Aspects of Naval History: Selected Papers Presented at the Fourth Naval History Symposium, United States Naval Academy 25–26 October 1979, Annapolis, Maryland: the United States Naval Institute (1981), 41–65.
