= Kara Hoja =

Kara Hoja, Kara Khoja, or Kara Hoca may refer to:

- Caracossa, 16th-century Ottoman-Italian corsair
- Gaochang, ancient oasis city in modern-day Xinjiang, China
- Karahoca, Haymana, village in Ankara Province, Turkey
- Qocho, kingdom in modern-day Xinjiang, China from 843 to 1353
