= Caracossa =

16th-century Barbary corsair

Kara Hoja (lit. 'black priest'), known as Caracossa, Ali Fartax or Candelissa in Europe, was an Italian Barbary corsair and defrocked Dominican friar allied with the Ottoman Empire. He is reputed to be from Chioggia, Fano, or Calabria. In June–July 1571, he led the blockade of the San Marco basin in Venice, which was the first ever direct nautical threat that the capital of the Republic of Venice faced in its history. He was present at the Battle of Lepanto later that year and was shot by a soldier with an arquebus. According to Antonio Bosio, he was killed in the Great Siege of Malta, although it is probably inaccurate.

== Bibliography ==
- Allen, Bruce Ware (6 June 2017). The Great Siege of Malta: The Epic Battle Between the Ottoman Empire and the Knights of St. John. University Press of New England. ISBN 9781512601169. OCLC 907190310.
- Zuidhoek, Arne (18 July 2022). The Pirate Encyclopedia: The Pirate's Way. Brill. ISBN 9789004515673.
