= Andrea Vicentino =

Italian painter

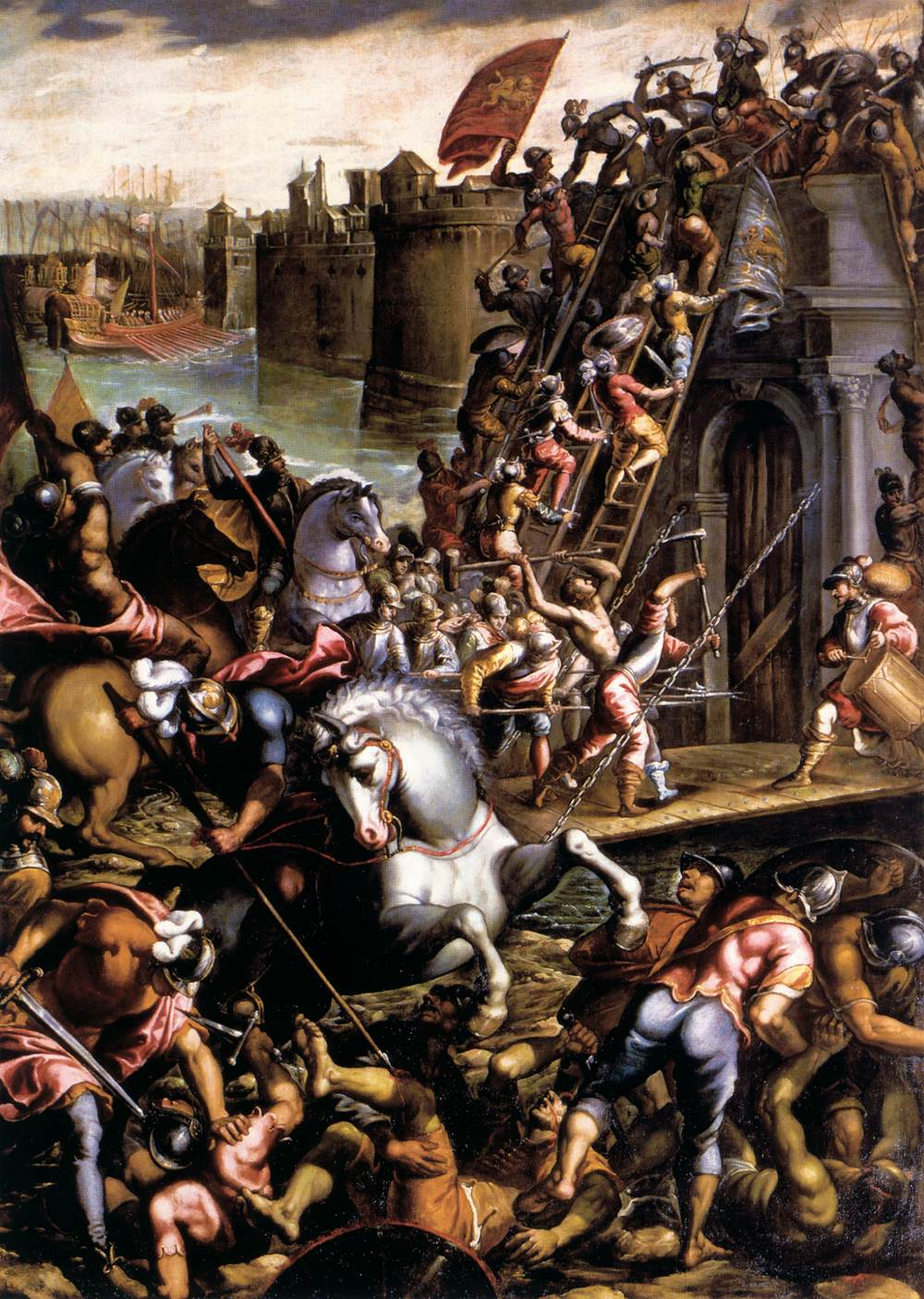
The crusaders conquering the City of Zara, painted by Andrea Vicentino.

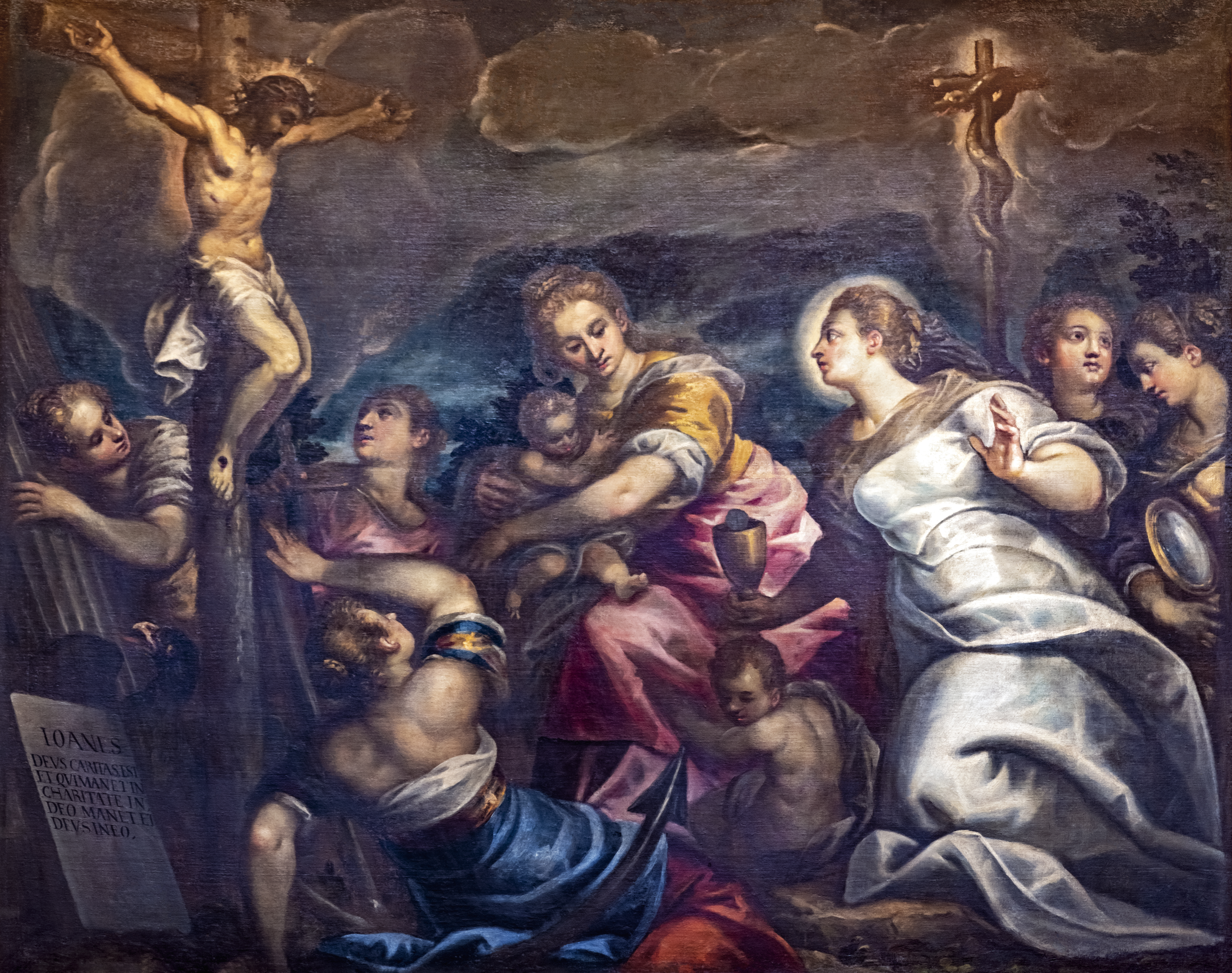
"Il serpente di bronzo innalzato da Mosè nel deserto".

Andrea Vicentino (c. 1542 – 1617) was an Italian painter of the late-Renaissance or Mannerist period. He was a pupil of the painter Giovanni Battista Maganza. Born in Vicenza, he was also known as Andrea Michieli or Michelli. He moved to Venice in the mid-1570s and registered in the Fraglia or guild of Venetian painters in 1583. He worked alongside Tintoretto at the Palazzo Ducale in Venice, helping paint The Arrival of Henry III at Venice (c. 1593) at the Sala delle Quattro Porte as well as works in the Sala del Senato and the Sala dello Scrutinio. He also painted the altarpiece Madonna of the Rosary (c. 1590) for the Treviso Cathedral, God the Father with Three Theological Virtues (1598) for the church in Gambara, and St Charles Borromeo (c. 1605) for a church in Mestre. Paintings by him exist in a number of galleries including the Raising of Lazarus at the National Museum of Fine Arts, Malta.
