= Panagia Nafpaktiotissa =

Icon of the Virgin Mary

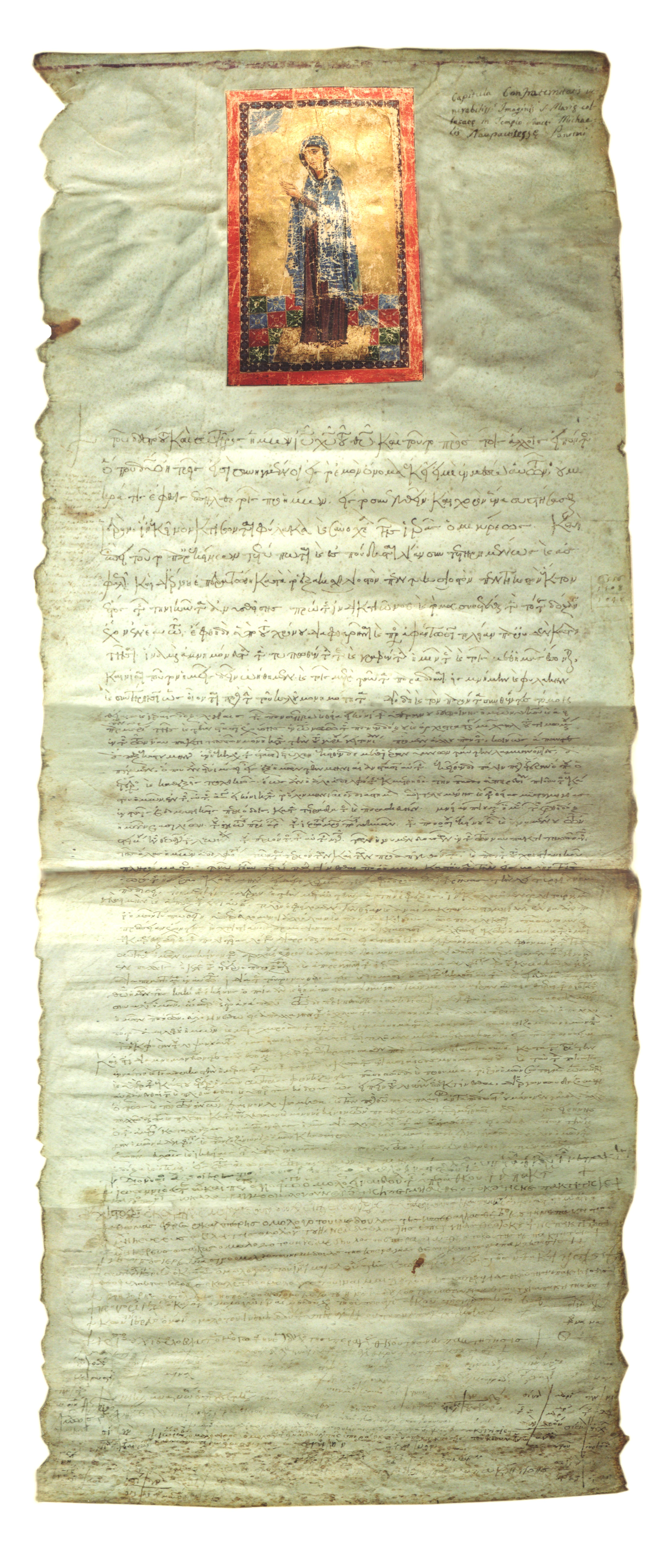
The Palermo Parchment

Panagia Nafpaktiotissa also known as Panagia tis Nafpaktos or Madonna di Lepanto is an icon of the Virgin Mary and a temple closely connected with the history of Nafpaktos, possibly as early as the 5th century AD.

== The Palermo Parchment ==
The case of the Virgin of Nafpaktos is inextricably linked to the historical Byzantine parchment kept in Palermo, Sicily, specifically in the archive of the Regia Cappella Palatina (State Museum of the Palace Chapel). This parchment is a copy of the charter of a religious brotherhood of the 10th century, which was active in the region of Thebes and whose center of honor and worship was the icon of the "Most Holy Theotokos of Nafpaktitis" which was kept in the Monastery of Nafpaktitis. The parchment was probably found in Palermo after and because of the Norman raid on the city of Thebes in 1147.

== The religious Brotherhood of Panagia Nafpaktiotissa ==
According to the testimony of the charter, the brotherhood was founded in 1048 AD. The statute is signed by 19 clergy and 30 lay people, including women. The purposes of the fraternity are primarily spiritual in nature. The form and honor of the Virgin and her icon dominates. Every month the Virgin visited the homes of the members and was honored with sacred rituals. The brotherhood also dedicated its prayers to the health of its members and to their general good condition here and beyond the grave.

== The picture ==
At her head, the parchment bears a miniature of the Virgin Mary standing on a marble floor and wearing a blue mantle and a purple tunic. Panagia is in prayer position. The specific iconographic type of the Virgin Mary was established from the middle of the 1st century. In all probability, this particular miniature is a copy of the icon of the Virgin of Nafpaktiotissa which was either brought to Thebes from Nafpaktos, or was a copy of the original. However, the cult of this particular image so far from its headquarters is evidence of its widespread honor.

== The temple and worship of Panagia in Nafpaktos ==
The temple probably dates from the 5th century. This pilgrimage was famous during the years of the Byzantine Empire and the Frankish rule and enjoyed privileges and donations from kings and emperors as the learned Metropolitan of Nafpaktos Ioannis Apokaykos (1217 AD) saves us. Among them are the emperors Alexios I Komnenos (1081-1118) and Michael I Komnenos (1143-1180). In Chrysoboulos of Theodoros Angelos Komnenos Doukas, Despot of Epirus, issued in May 1228, at the request of Apokaukos, his decision to help the metropolitan temple of Nafpaktos as a dedication to the city's patroness Theotokos is mentioned.

== The Virgin Mary of Nafpaktos and the historical Naval Battle of Nafpaktos ==
When the time came for the infamous Naval Battle of Nafpaktos, Pope Pius V ordered for the first time the use of the rosary with the request to the Virgin Mary to bring victory to the allied Christians against the Turks, who until then were invincible in sea. When victory unexpectedly came, it was attributed to the intervention of the Virgin Mary. Our Lady of Nafpaktos has since been called Santa Maria del Rozario or Madonna di Lepanto del Rozario in the West. The Pope designated October 7 as a feast day for the Virgin Mary of Nafpaktos for the entire Christian West. The Battle of Nafpaktos inspired many artists including the great Tisianos, Vicentinos and Domenikos Theotokopoulos. In many similar paintings, the Virgin Mary is depicted blessing and giving victory to Christians. Piemonte Chilardi wrote that, not the valor, nor the weapons, nor the leaders, but the Virgin gave the victory. The Venetian Republic wrote the same in the Palazzo Ducale: Non virtus, non arma, non duces, sed Maria Rozarii vit ores nos feces.
