= William Oliver Stevens =

American writer and professor for the United States Naval Academy

William Oliver Stevens (October 7, 1878 - January 15, 1955) was an American writer and Professor for the United States Naval Academy.

Stevens was born in Yangon. His grandfather was Francis Mason a famous missionary. He moved to the United States and graduated from Colby College in 1899 with a B.A. in English literature. In 1903 he received a Ph.D. from Yale University.

He taught at the United States Naval Academy (1905–1924) as Senior Professor and Executive of the English Department.

Stevens was also interested in ghost hunting and psychical research.

== Publications ==
- Nantucket: The Far-Away Island (1936)
- Old Williamsburg and Her Neighbors. New York: Dodd, Mead & Company. 1938.
- Charleston: Historic City of Gardens (1939)
- Discovering Long Island (1939)
- Pistols at Ten Paces (1940)
- Washington, the Cinderella City (1943)
- Unbidden Guests: A Book of Real Ghosts (1945)
- A History of Sea Power (1947)
- The Mystery of Dreams (1949)
- Psychics and Common Sense (1953)
