= Holy League (1535) =

Ad hoc coalition of Catholic states

The Holy League of 1535 was an ad hoc coalition of Catholic states arranged by Pope Paul III at the urging of Charles V.

In 1533, Suleiman the Magnificent ordered Hayreddin Barbarossa, whom he had summoned from Algiers, to build a large war fleet in the arsenal of Constantinople. Altogether 70 galleys were built during the winter of 1533–1534, manned by slave oarsmen, including 2,000 Jewish ones. With this fleet, Barbarossa conducted aggressive raids along the coast of Italy, until he conquered Tunis on 16 August 1534, ousting the local ruler, theretofore subservient to the Spanish, Muley Hasan.

Barbarossa thus established a strong naval base in Tunis, which could be used for raids in the region, and on nearby Malta. The implications were dramatic for Madrid. Tunis would have also provided a springboard for raids and invasions of Habsburg controlled Sicily and Naples, providing a permanent presence in the western Mediterranean, which could have threatened Rome itself. It was also feared in Madrid that Tunis might be exploited by a Franco-Ottoman coalition thus tilting the balance of power in Italy in favour of Paris

Charles V, one of the most powerful men in Europe at the time, assembled a large army of some 30,000 soldiers, 74 galleys (rowed by chained Protestants shipped in from Antwerp), and 300 sailing ships, including the carrack Santa Anna and the Portuguese galleon São João Baptista, also known as Botafogo (the most powerful ship in the world at the time, with 366 bronze cannons) to drive the Ottomans from the region. The expense involved for Charles V was considerable, and at 1,000,000 ducats was on par with the cost of Charles' campaign against Suleiman on the Danube. Unexpectedly, the funding of the conquest of Tunis came from the galleons sailing in from the New World, in the form of a 2 million gold ducats treasure extracted by Francisco Pizarro in exchange for his releasing of the Inca king Atahualpa (whom he nevertheless executed on 29 August 1533).

== See also ==
- Ottoman–Venetian War (1537–1540)
- Siege of Castelnuovo
- Conquest of Tunis (1535)
- Ottoman–Portuguese confrontations
