= Sack of Rethymnon (1567) =

Invasion of Crete, 1567

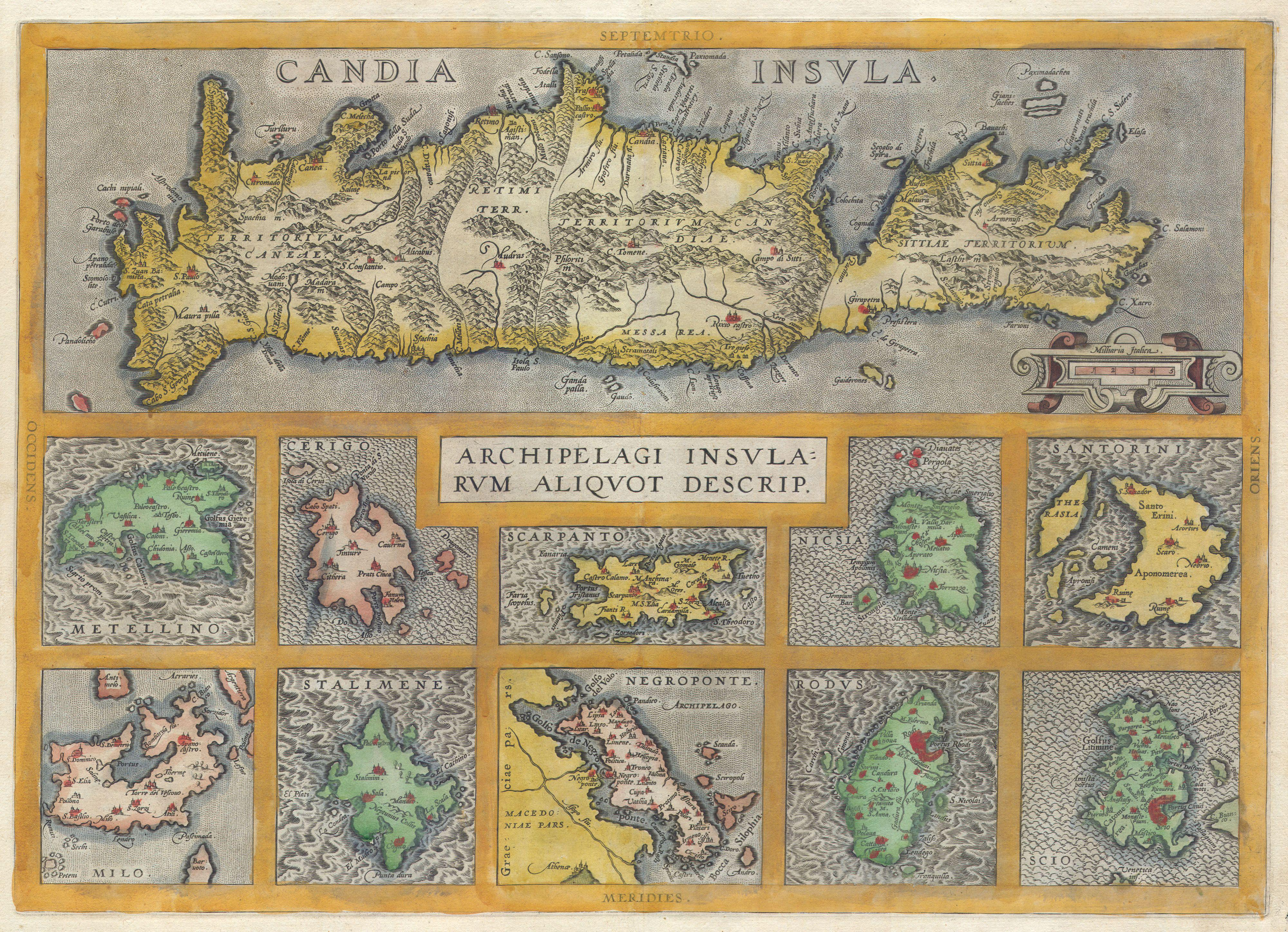
- Map of Crete and other Greek islands (1584)
Date	1567
Location	Crete
Result	Algerian Victory

Belligerents
Regency of Algiers	Republic of Venice; Knights of Malta

Commanders and leaders
Euldj Reis	Unknown

Casualties and losses
None	Many Captured

The Sack of Rethymnon was an Algerian raid in Crete that took place in 1567.

== Raid ==
Euldj Reis, an Ottoman naval commander and Pasha for the Ottoman Province of Tripoli, conducted numerous raids off the coast of Italy. Eventually, Reis raided Crete, where he and his crew defeated the town of Rethymno's defense of 7,000 men and burned the town down. Rethymno's riches were then plundered and its people captured by Barbary pirates. The raid was one of the many raids done on the island of Crete by Ottoman pirates.
