= Battle of Gozo (1570) =

Naval battle between Malta and Ottoman Empire

Naval battle of Gozo (1570)
- Part of Ottoman–Venetian War (1570–1573)
Date	15 July 1570
Location	Gozo
Result	Ottoman victory

Belligerents
(Sovereign Military Order of Malta) Order of Saint John	Ottoman Empire

Commanders and leaders
(Sovereign Military Order of Malta) Francesco St Clement	Uluj Ali

Strength
4 galleys	19 galleons

Casualties and losses
3 galleys lost 80 knights captured	Unknown

The battle of Gozo was a naval battle between forces of Malta, then under the protection of the Order of Saint John, and the Ottomans. The battle took place on July 15, 1570, after four Maltese galleys encountered an Ottoman fleet under Uluj Ali. Three Maltese galleys were captured by the Ottomans, and one fled.

== Background ==
With the beginning of the Ottoman-Venetian War in 1570, the Knights of Malta prepared to send their fleet to the Eastern Mediterranean to help Venice. When the Maltese fleet under the command of Francesco St Clement arrived in Messina, he learned that Giovanni Andrea Doria had gone to Tunis with 50 ships to block the fleet of Algerian Governor Uluj Ali Pasha. However, Uluj Ali Pasha had already passed through the strait between Tunis and Sicily. Thereupon, the Maltese fleet returned to Malta and aimed to resupply. However, Uluj Ali Pasha was waiting for them in Gozo with his 19 galleons.

== Battle ==
Both fleets sighted each other on July 15. The Maltese were taken by surprise, and their leader, Francesco, ran away without keeping his ships together. His flagship, the Capitana, and the ship St Giovanni went north for the Sicilian coast, while the other two ships, St Maria de la Victoria and St Anna went in a north-west direction. Uluj divided his ships; 12 of them would chase the first pair, while 7 of them would chase the second. St Giovanni was captured without resistance, and the Capitana headed to Palma di Montechiaro, where Francesco took refuge there and left his ships for the Ottomans, which they captured.

Meanwhile, St Maria de la Victoria and St Anna, seeing the Ottomans split up, attempted to take out the leader of these ships before they could meet up; however, St Anna eventually got surrounded by the Ottomans. After fierce resistance by the Maltese knights, the ship was eventually taken, and St Maria de la Victoria eventually escaped to Agrigento. The Maltese lost their 3 ships, and 80 knights were captured in this disastrous battle.

== Aftermath ==
Francesco and his two officers on his ship were condemned to death for their cowardice. Uluj Ali returned to Algiers with his prizes on July 20. He learned from his prisoners that the Ottoman sultan and the Christians were preparing a large fleet between him and the Levant. At this moment, he made no further movement until the next year.

== Sources ==
- Dennis Angelo Castillo, The Maltese Cross: A Strategic History of Malta, 2006.
- Anderson, R.C, Naval Wars in the Levant, 1559–1853.
