= Kılıç Ali Pasha Complex =

Mosque in Istanbul, Turkey

Kılıç Ali Pasha Mosque
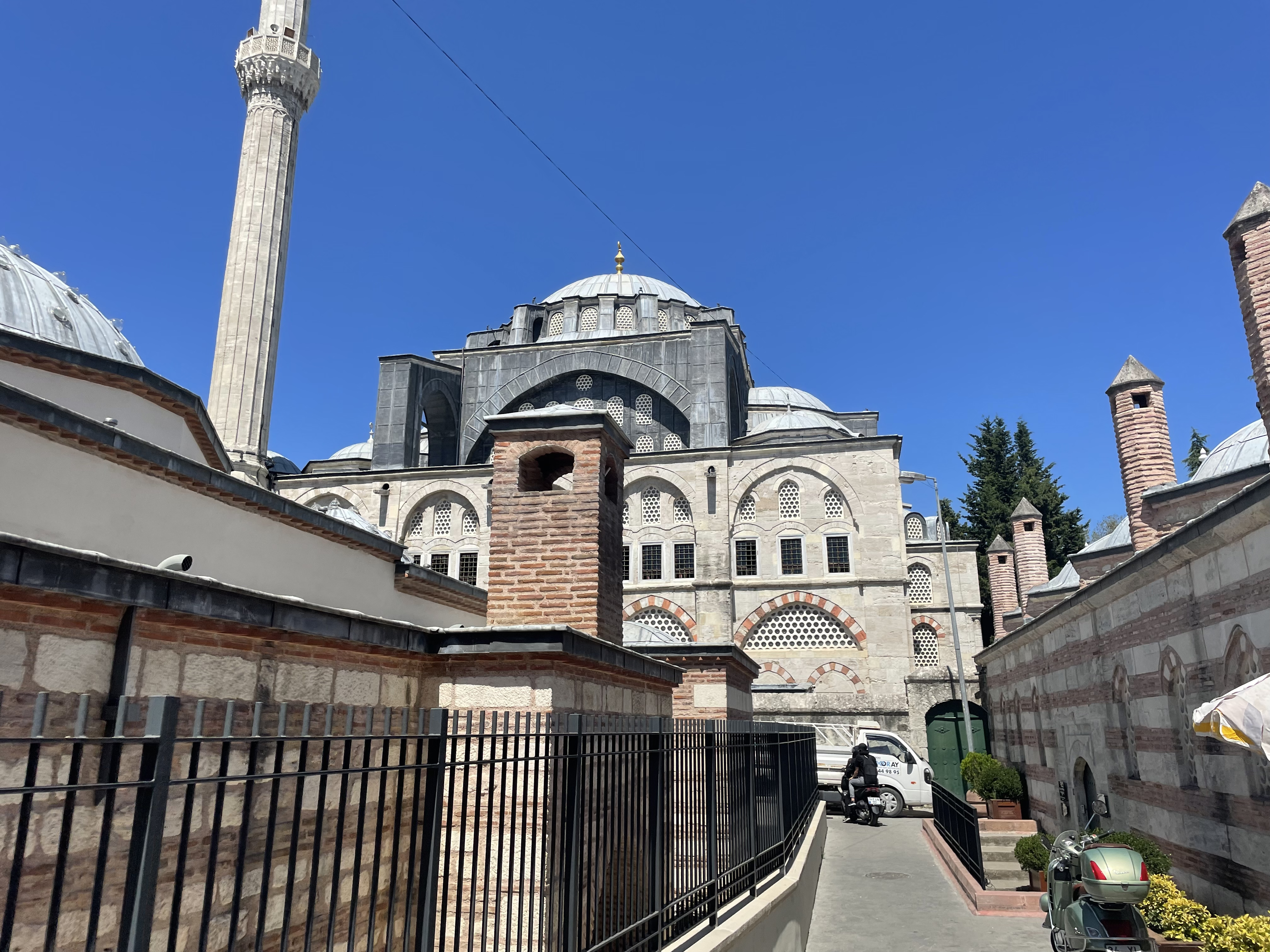

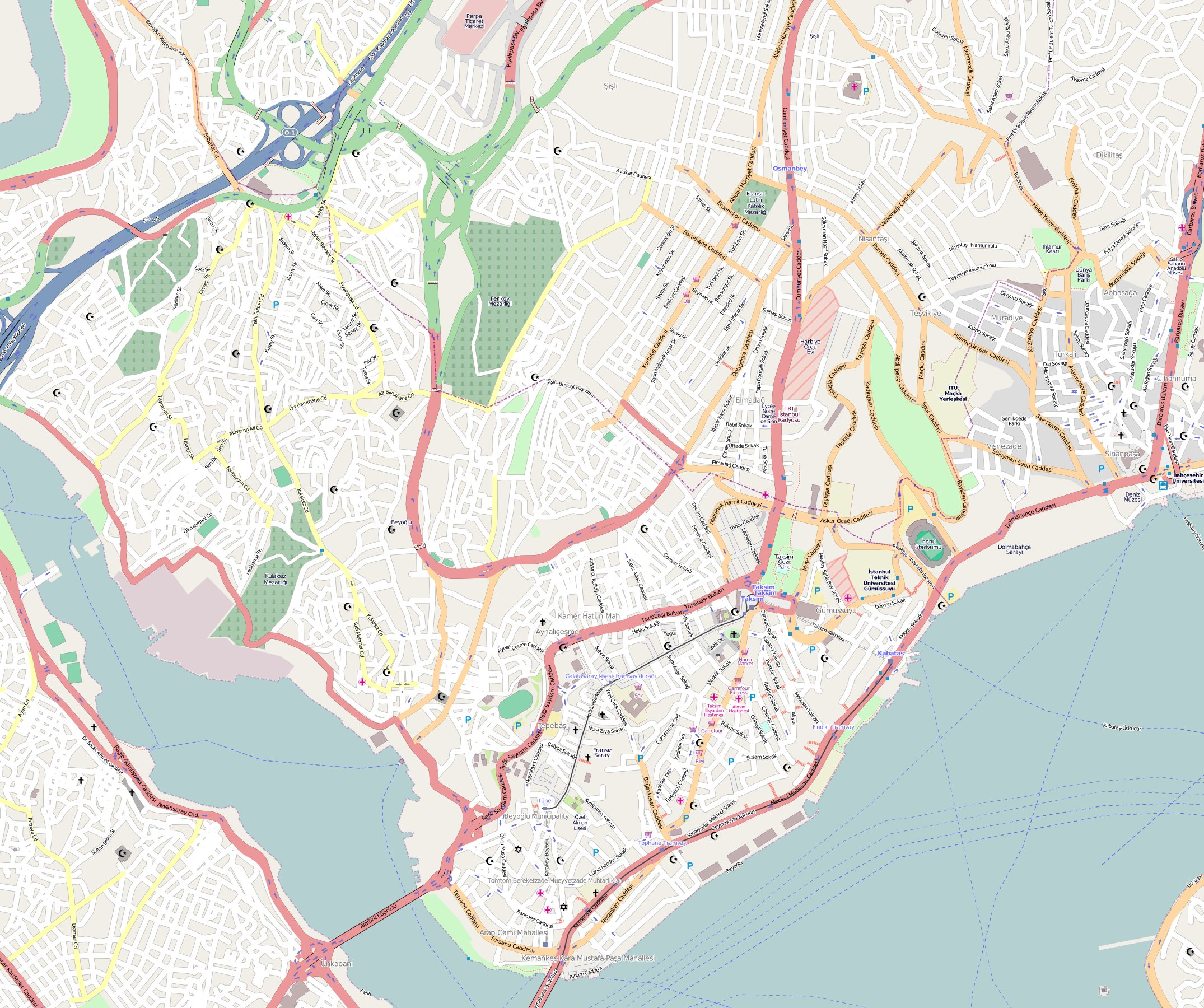
- Location within the Beyoglu district of Istanbul

Religion
- Affiliation: Sunni Islam

Location
- Location: Istanbul, Turkey
- Coordinates: 41.026373°N 28.980928°E

Architecture
- Architect: Mimar Sinan
- Type: Mosque
- Style: Ottoman architecture
- Groundbreaking: 1578
- Completed: 1580

Specifications
- Dome dia. (outer): 12.7 m (42 ft)
- Minaret: 1

The Kılıç Ali Pasha Mosque (Turkish: Kılıç Ali Paşa Cami) is a mosque at the heart of a complex designed and built between 1580 and 1587 by Mimar Sinan, who at the time was in his 90s. The mosque itself was constructed in 1578–1580.

The complex is located in the Tophane neighbourhood of the Beyoğlu district of Istanbul, Turkey. It was built for the Kapudan-i Derya (Grand Admiral) Kılıç Ali Pasha who was told to build it beside the sea because he was an admiral. The complex consists of a mosque, a medrese, a hamam, a türbe, and a fountain.

The Kılıç Ali Pasha Mosque originally stood right beside the Bosphorus, but since the water in front of it has since been filled in, it is now surrounded by other buildings (in particular it now faces the Galataport cruise terminal).

== Architecture ==
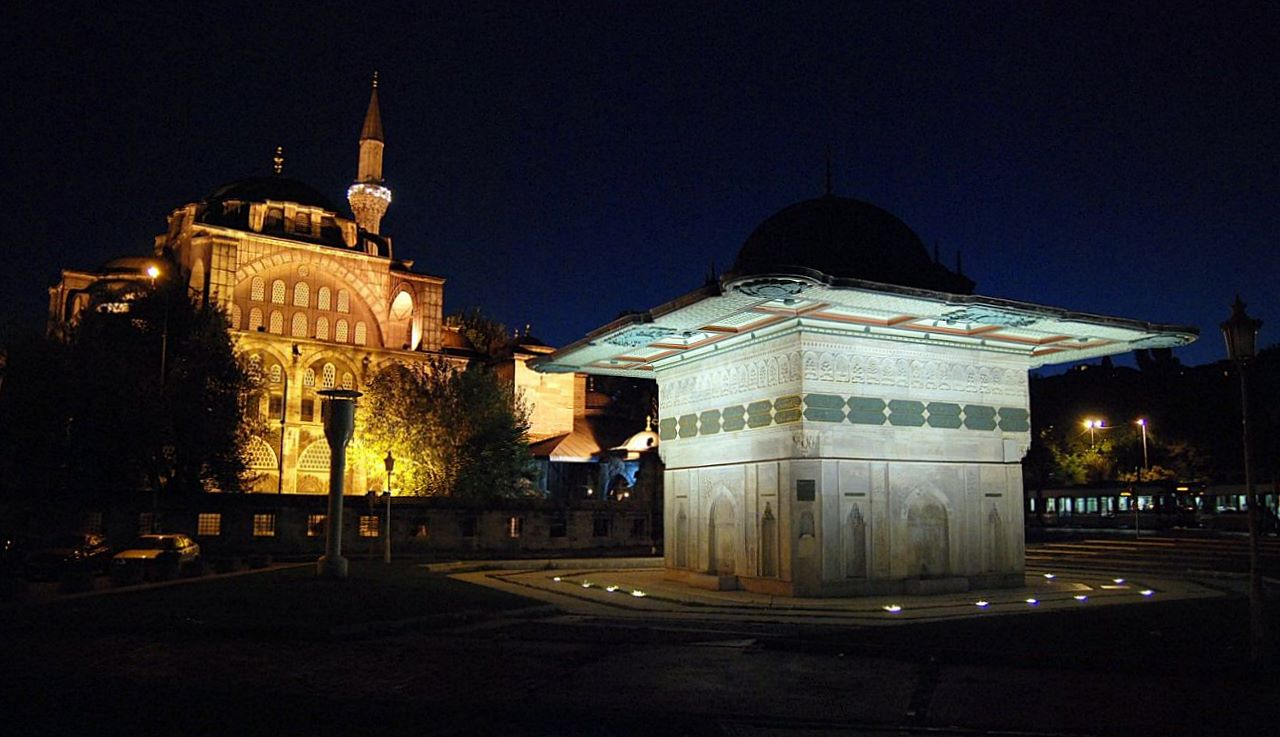
Kılıç Ali Paşa mosque and Tophane fountain

=== Mosque ===
The central dome of the mosque is 12.70 metres (41.7 ft) in diameter, carried on pendentives on granite piers and two half-domes on the Qibla axis. Towards the entrance, on two sides, there is a two-storey gallery. The dome is placed at the center with two exedrae rather like a Byzantine basilica, thus the resemblance to Hagia Sophia.

Above the prayer hall are five small domes carried on six marble columns. The tile panels placed high up in the prayer hall are inscribed with ayats (verses) from the Quran. The mosque has only one minaret with one gallery but there are 247 windows including the twenty-four of the central dome. The mihrab is in a square projecting apse.

A 16th-century ship lamp that used to hang from the central dome was removed to the Museum of Ottoman and Turkish Naval History (now the Istanbul Naval Museum/Deniz Müzesi) in 1948.

Two chronograms in the mosque both date it to 988 in the Hijri (Islamic) calendar (1580 in the Julian calendar).

One of the two inscriptions, at the outer entrance of the complex, features a four-verse poem in jali thuluth calligraphic script in Ottoman Turkish by the poet Ulvî and written by calligrapher Demircikulu Yusuf:

Mîr-i bahr â’nî Kılıç Paşa Kapudan-ı zemân

Yaptı çün bu camii ola yeri Darüsselâm
Hâtif-i kudsî görüp Ulvî dedi tarihini

Ehl-i imâna ibâdetgâh olsun bu makam

The letters in the final line - 'May this be a house of worship for people of the faith' - add up to the number 988.

=== Courtyard ===
The courtyard contains a marble fountain for ablutions before prayer with eight columns and a dome. The outer porch has a sloping roof supported by twelve columns on the west façade and three at each end, all with rhombus-shaped capitals. In the center a marble portal leads into the mosque.

The graveyard contains the octagonal türbe of Kılıç Ali Pasha with a dome designed by Mimar Sinan. Its wooden doors are inlaid with mother-of-pearl.

=== Medrese ===
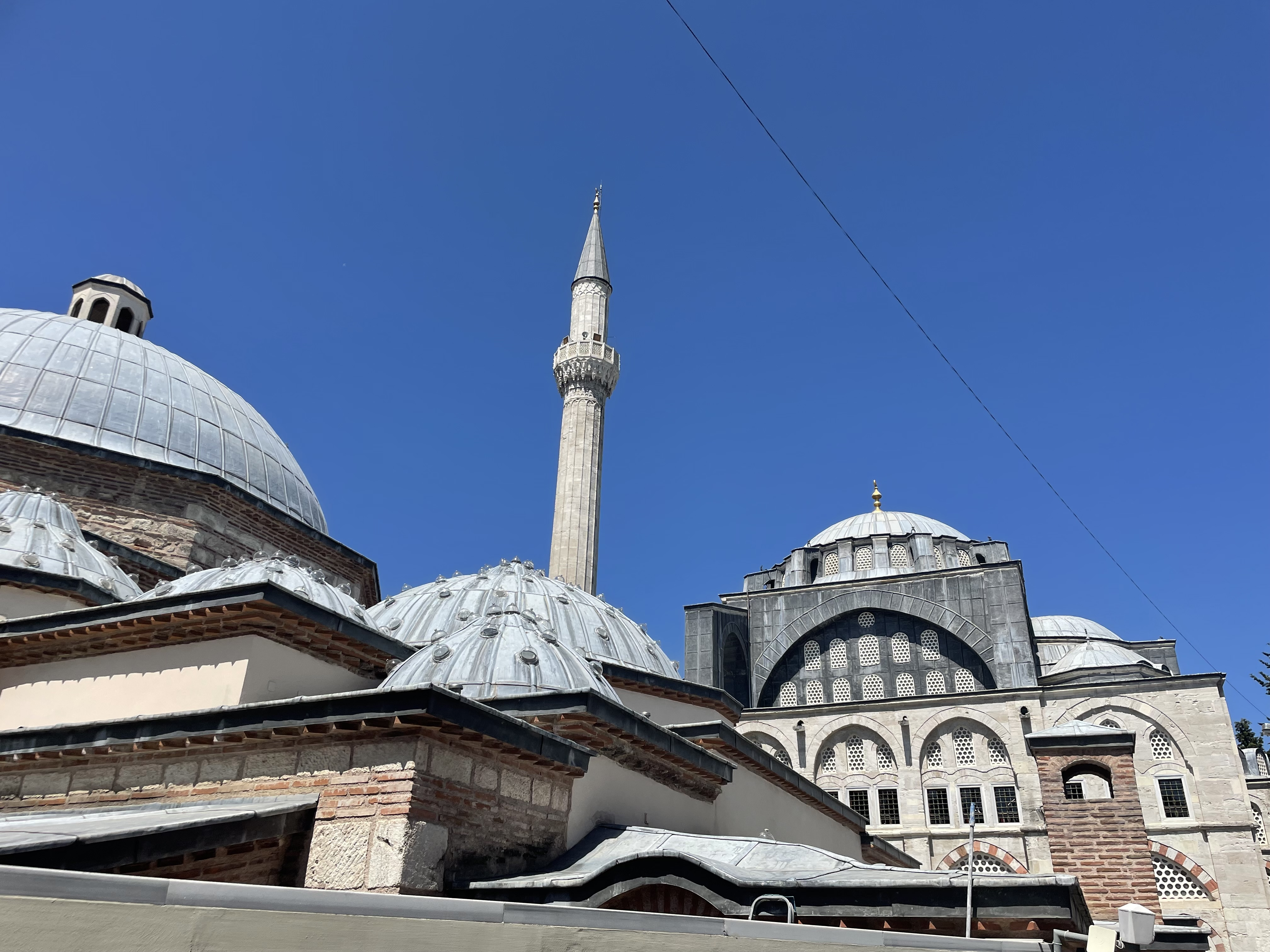
Domes of the hamam complex (on the left) and the mosque (on the right)

The medrese, opposite the southeast corner of the mosque, is almost square. It is possible that it was not designed by Mimar Sinan since it does not appear in the official list of his works, the Tazkirat-al-Abniya.

=== Hamam ===
To the right of the mosque is the hamam, completed in 1583. The glass doors lead into two separate soğukluks (cool rooms) on either side of the hararet (caldarium - hot room) which is hexagonal in plan with open bathing places in four of its six arched recesses, the other two opening on to the soğukluks. The placement of the soğukluks and the plan of the hararet differ from the usual layout used by Sinan in other surviving hamams.

== Gallery ==
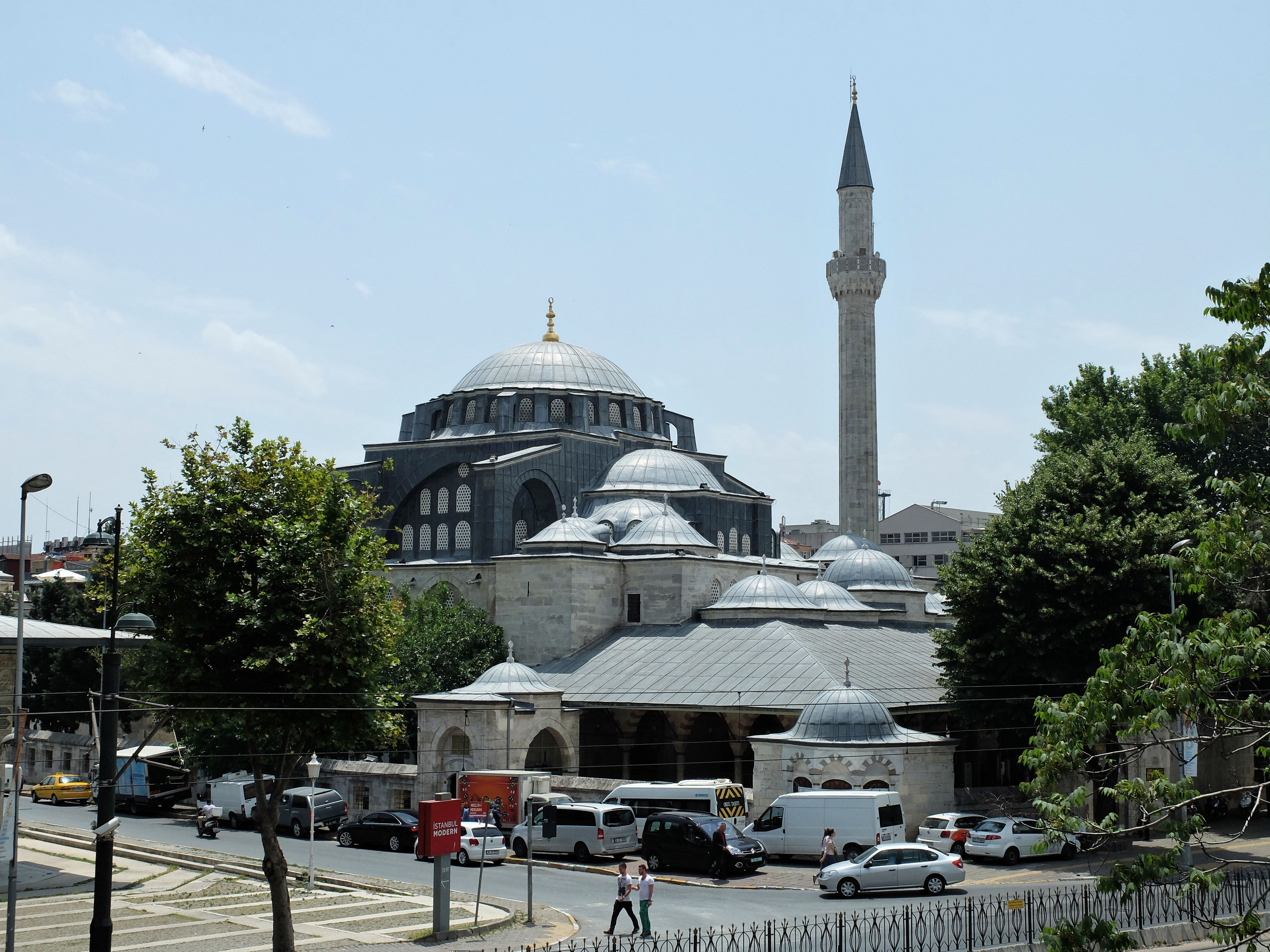
Kilic Ali Pasa Mosque view from Tophane

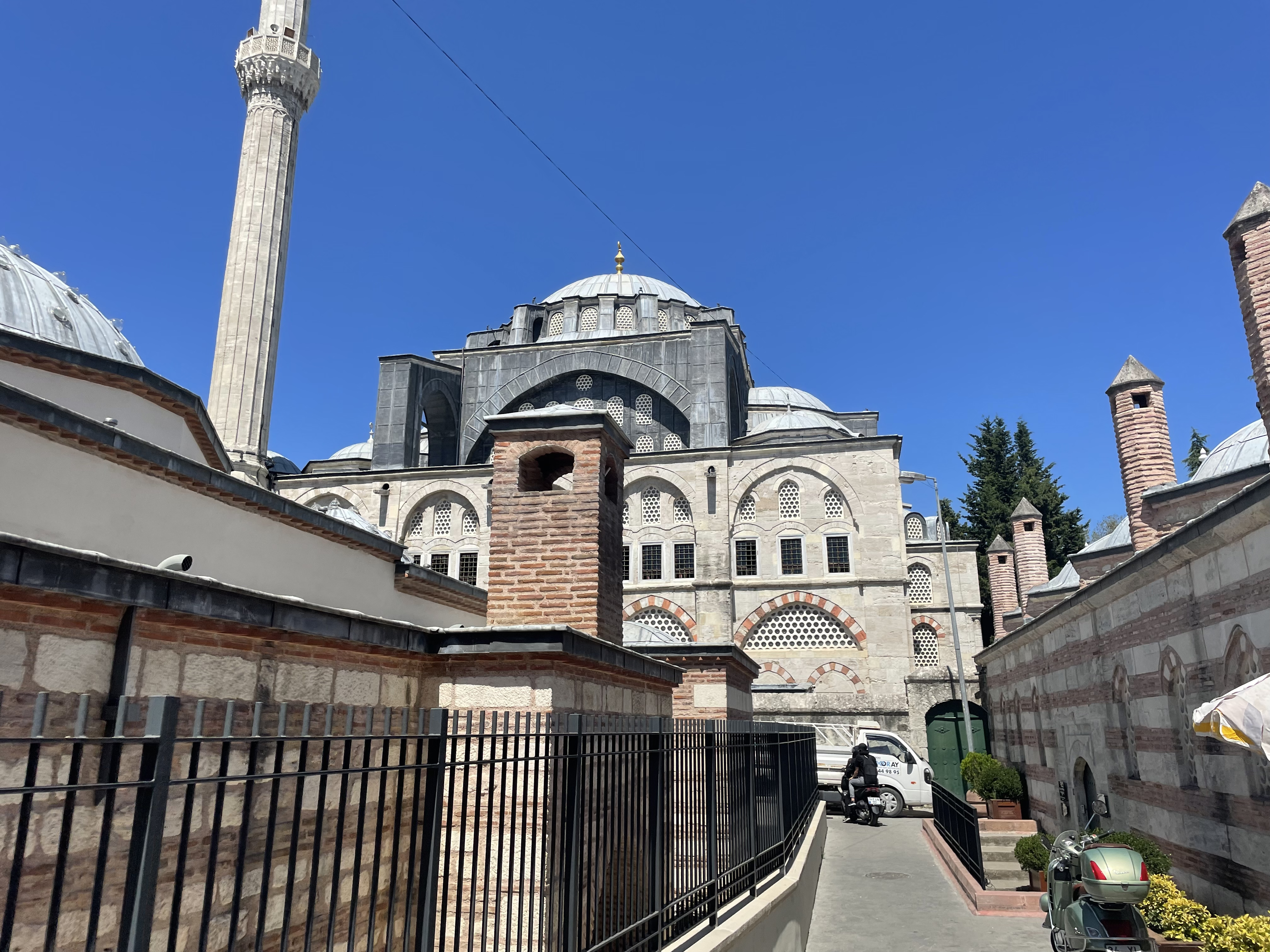
Kilic Ali Pasha Mosque from hamam side

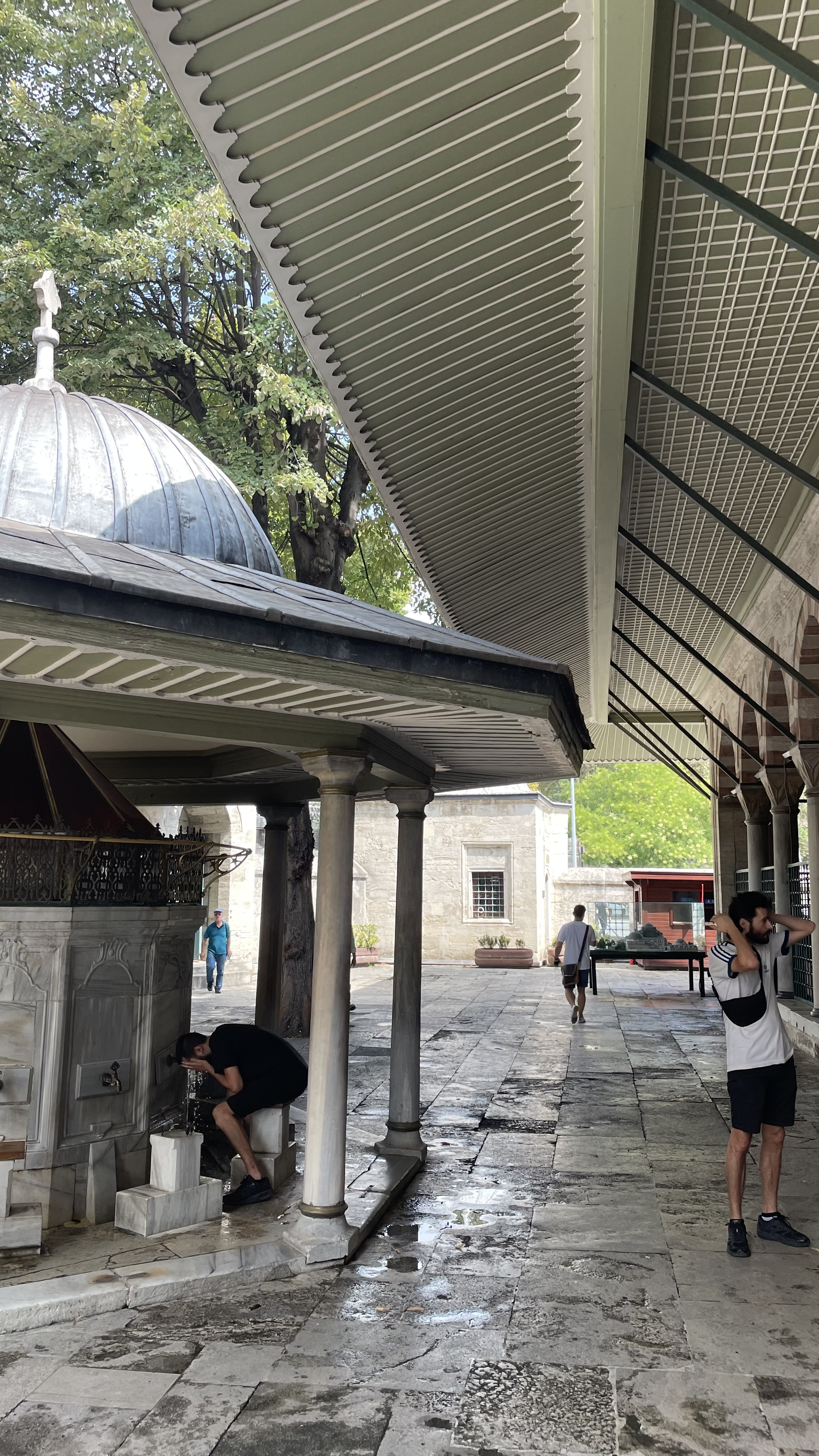
Kilic Ali Pasha Mosque courtyard and ablutions fountain

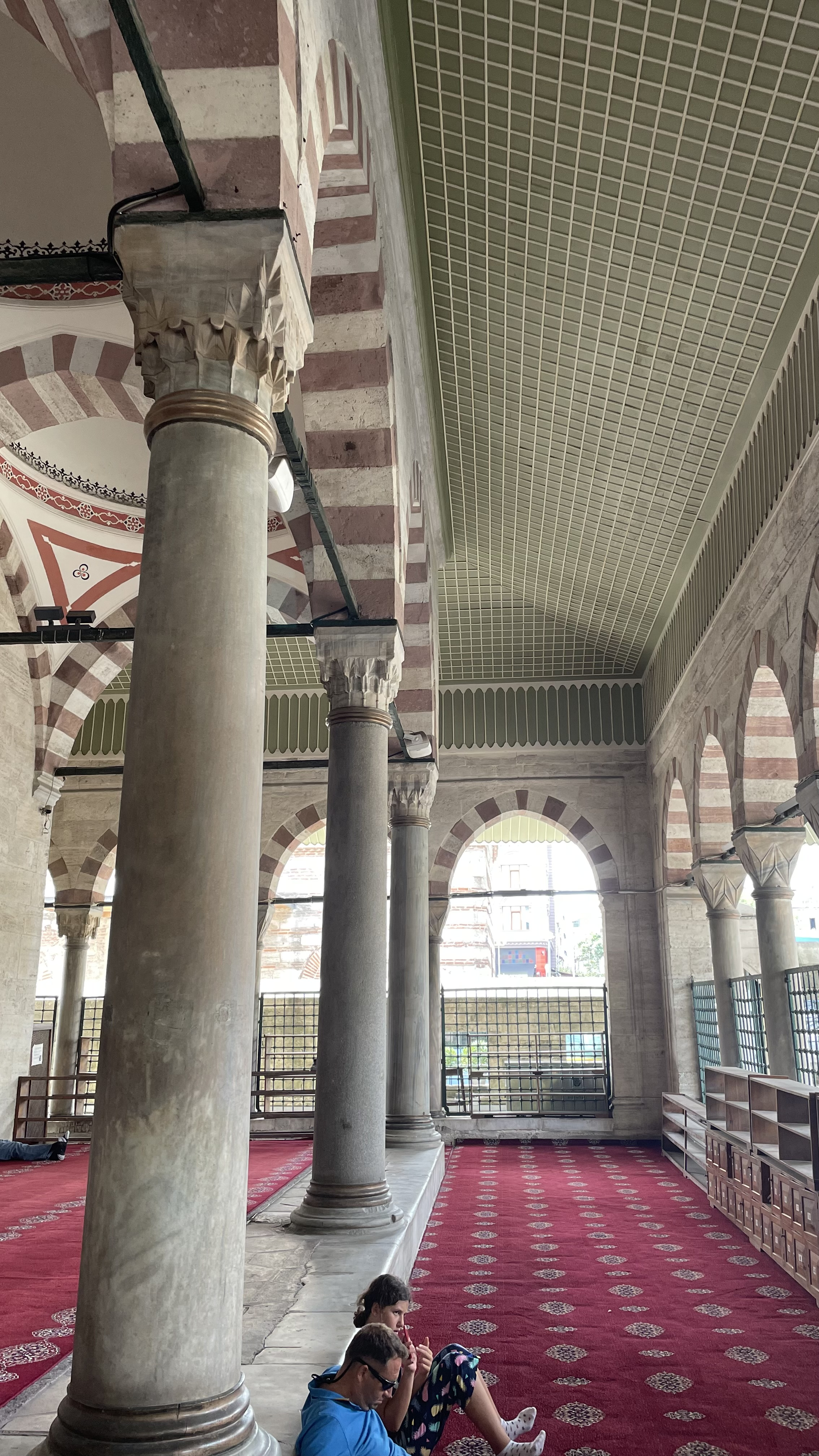
Entrance of the Kilic Ali Pasa Mosque

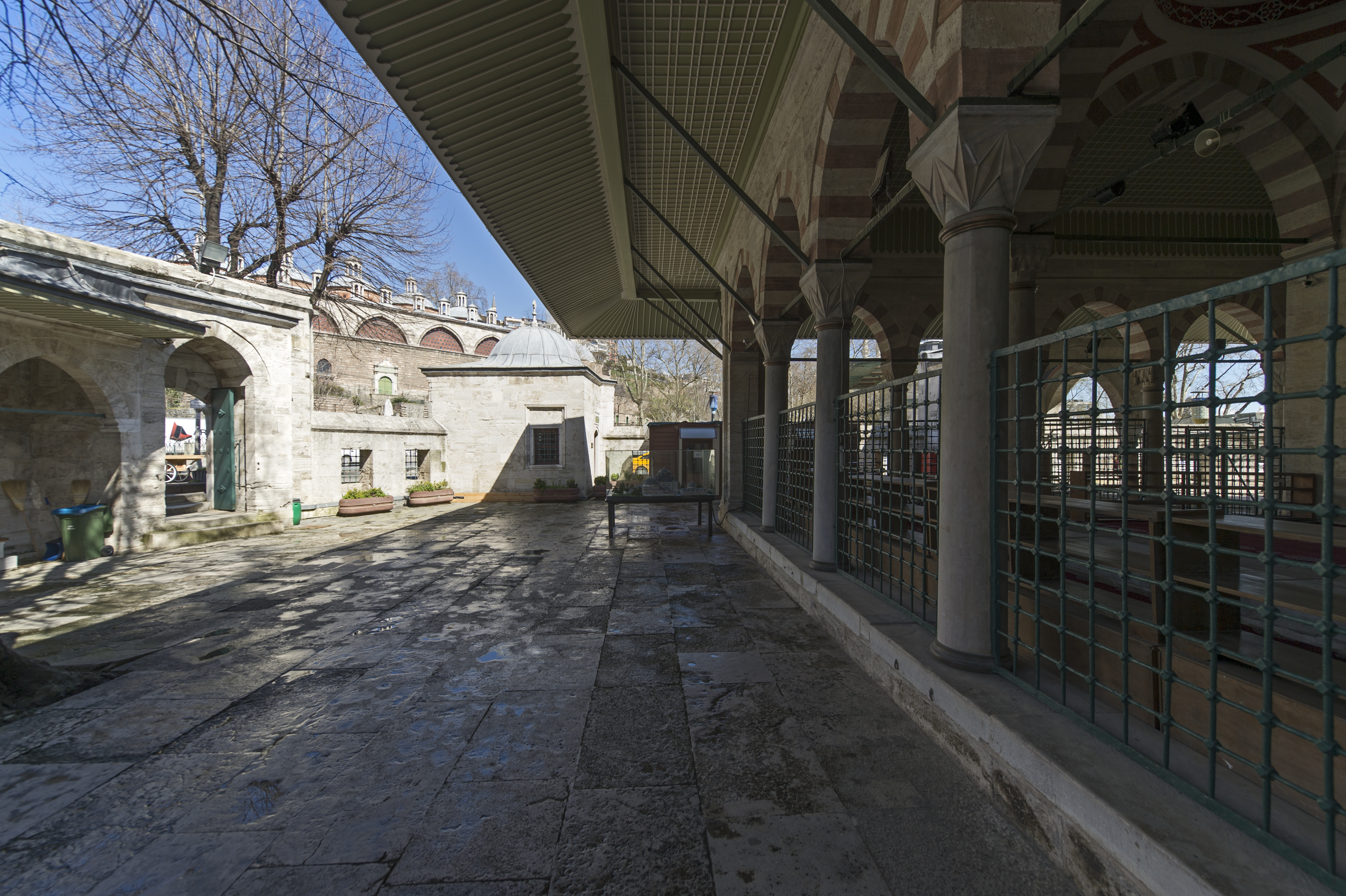
Kilic Ali Pasa Mosque courtyard

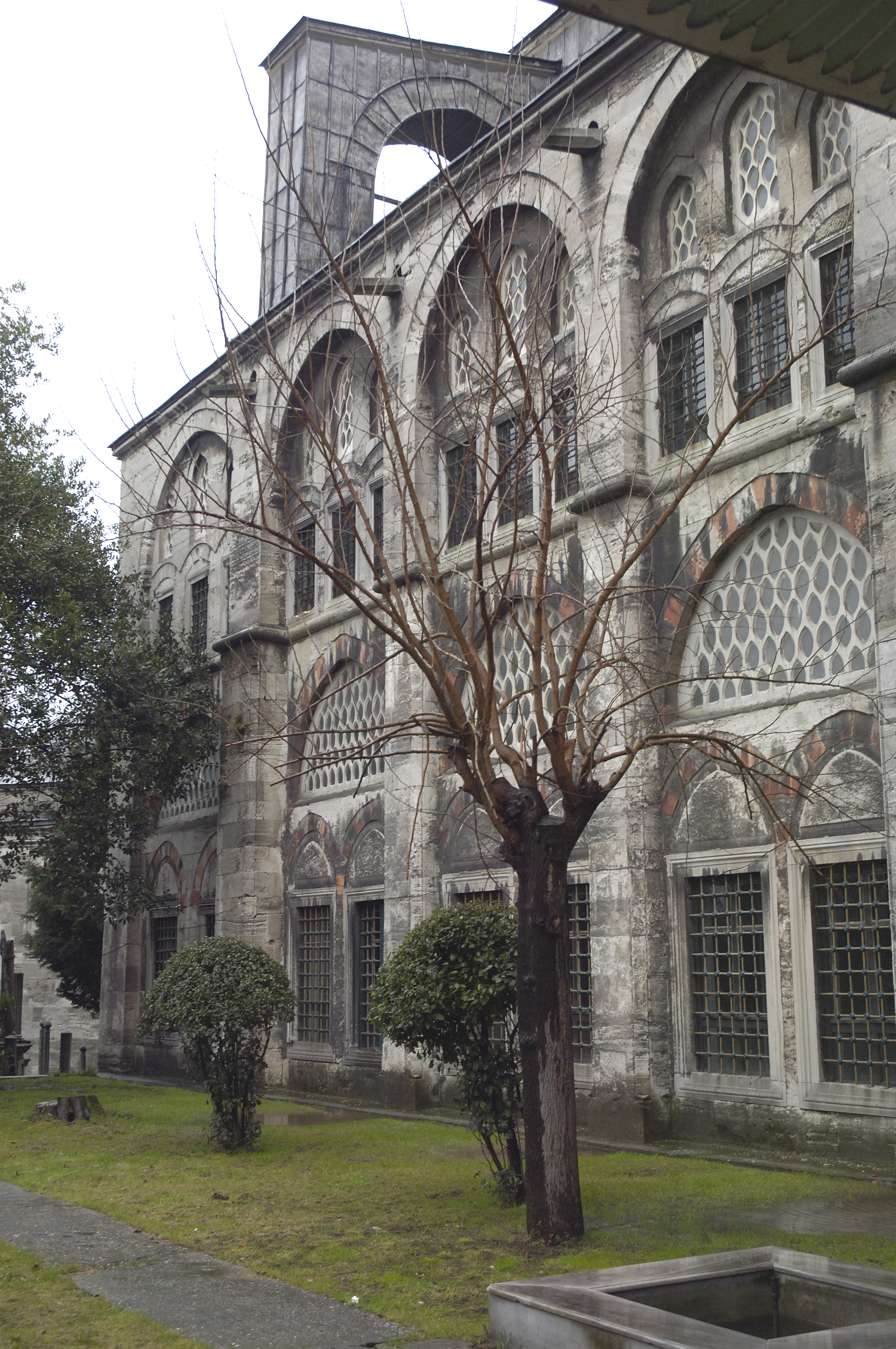
Kilic Ali Pasha Mosque east side

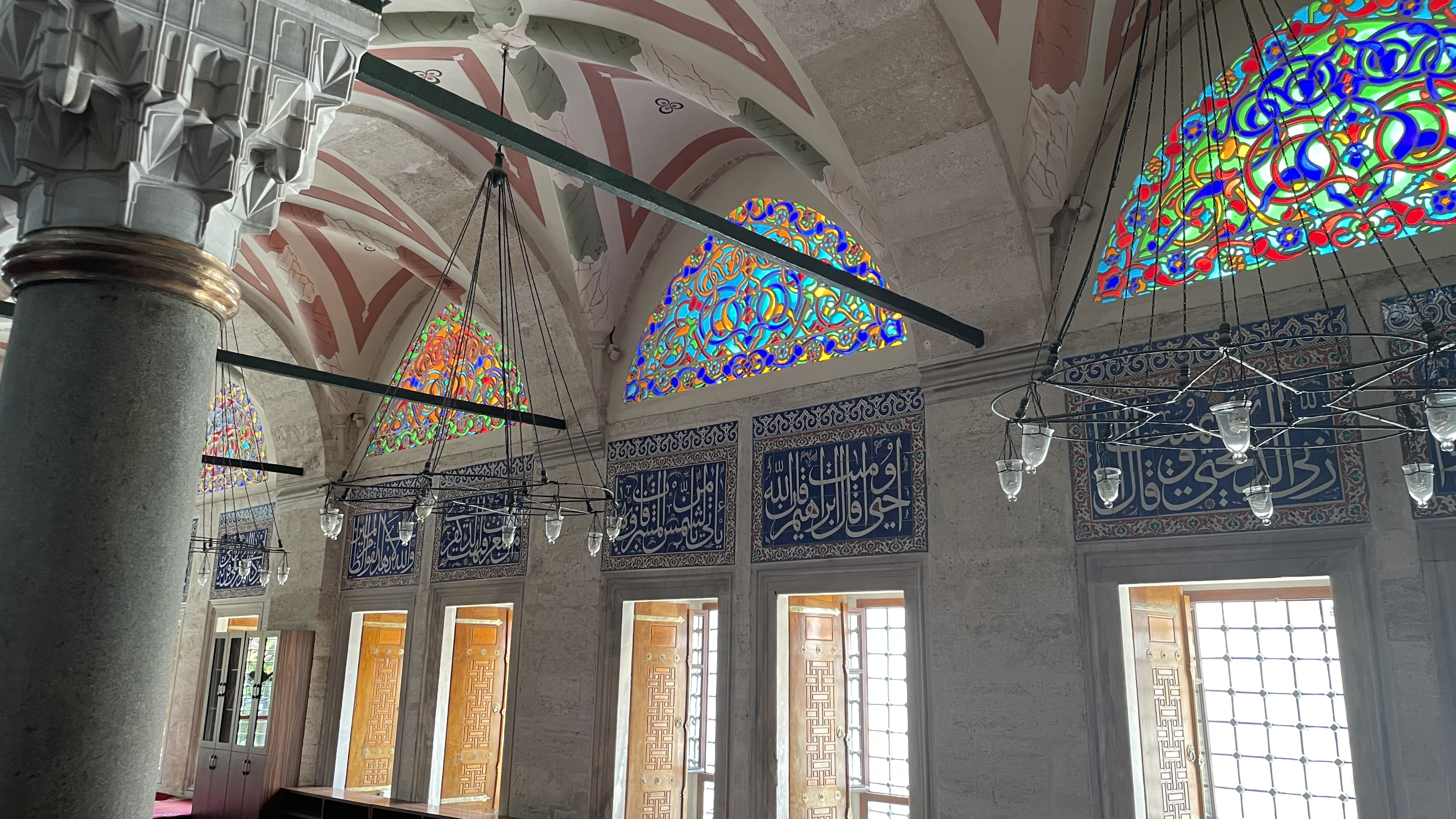
Kilic Ali Pasha Mosque interior

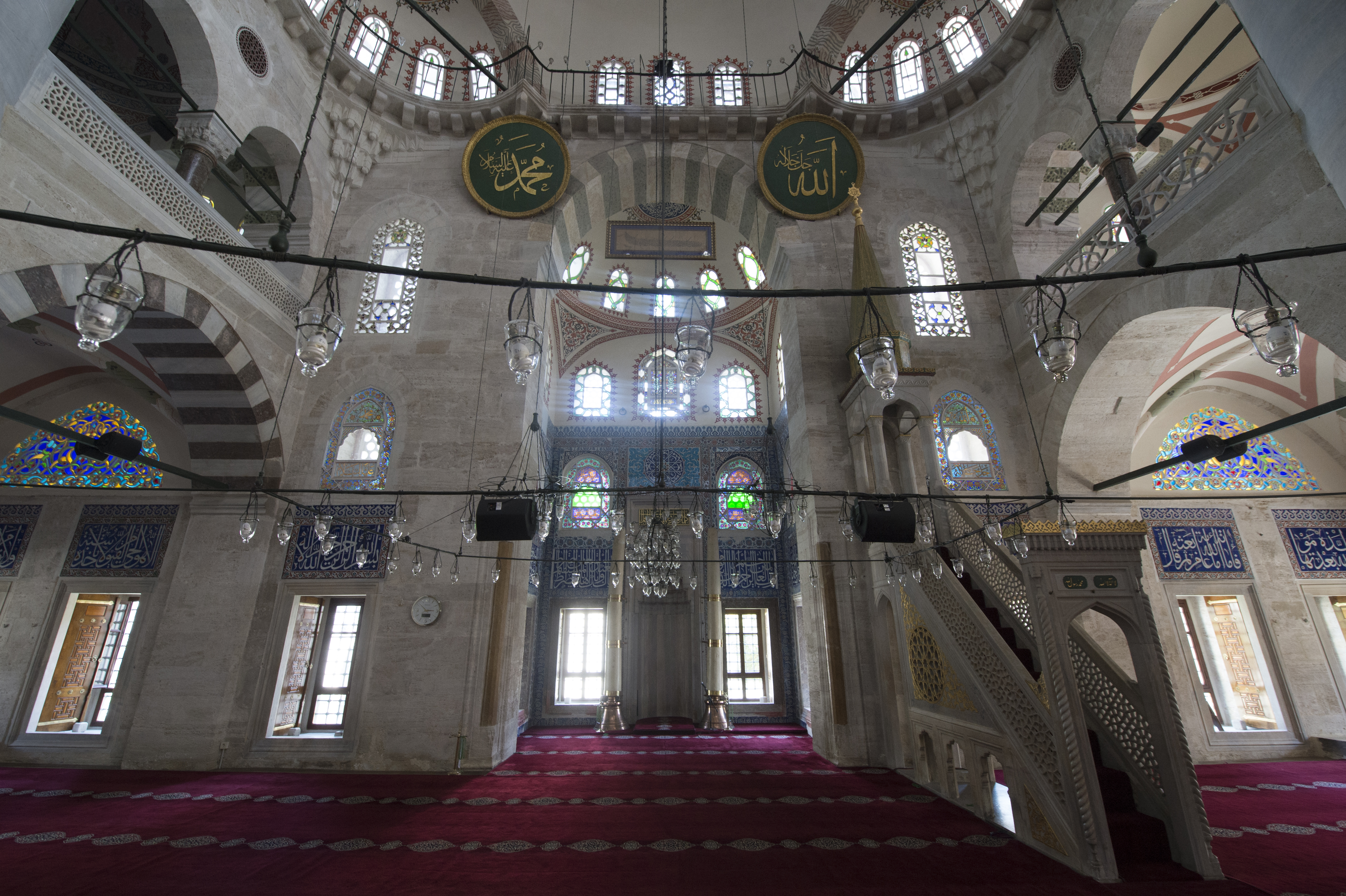
Kilic Ali Pasha Mosque looking towards mihrab and minber

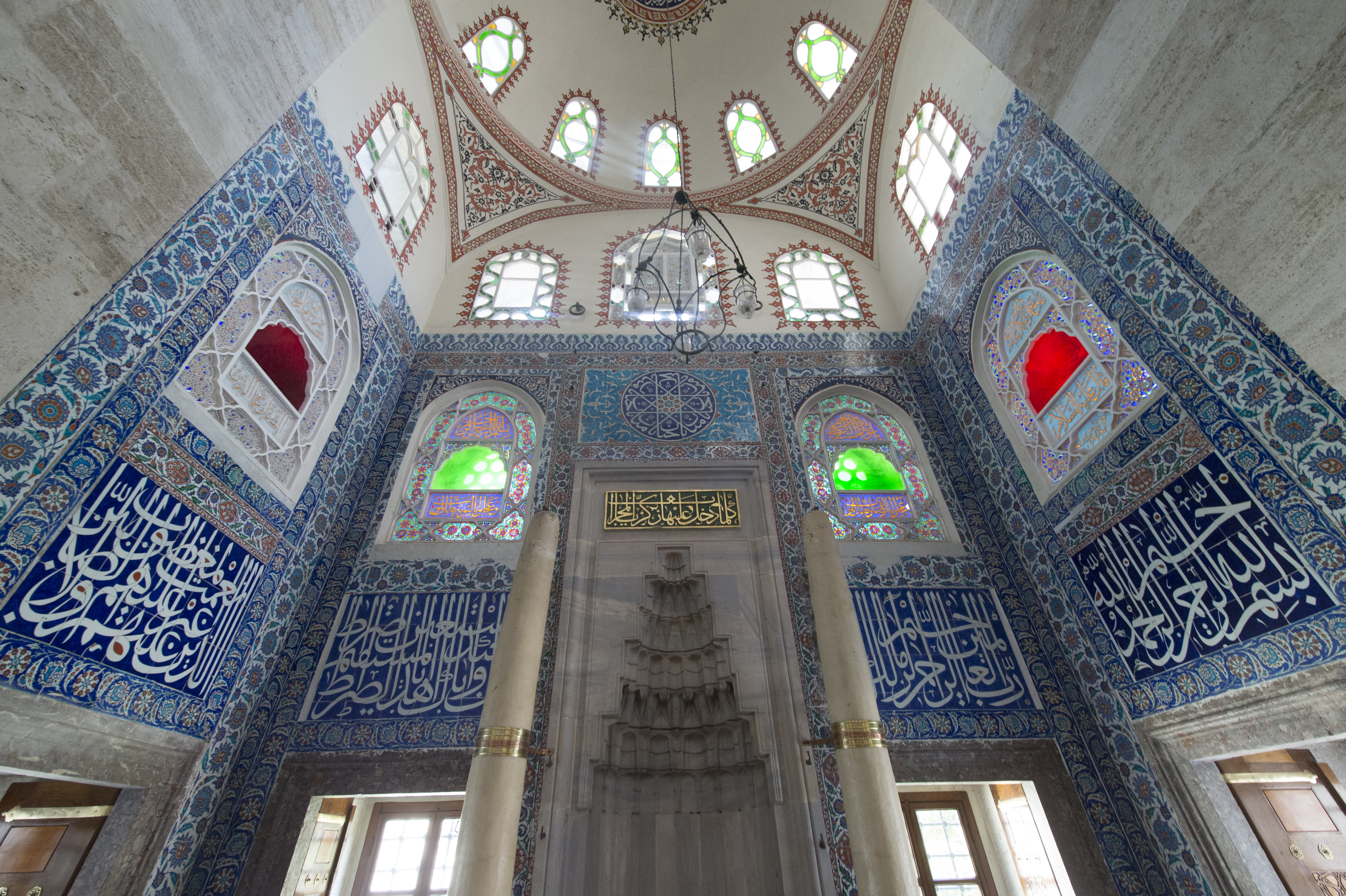
Kilic Ali Pasha Mosque mihrab

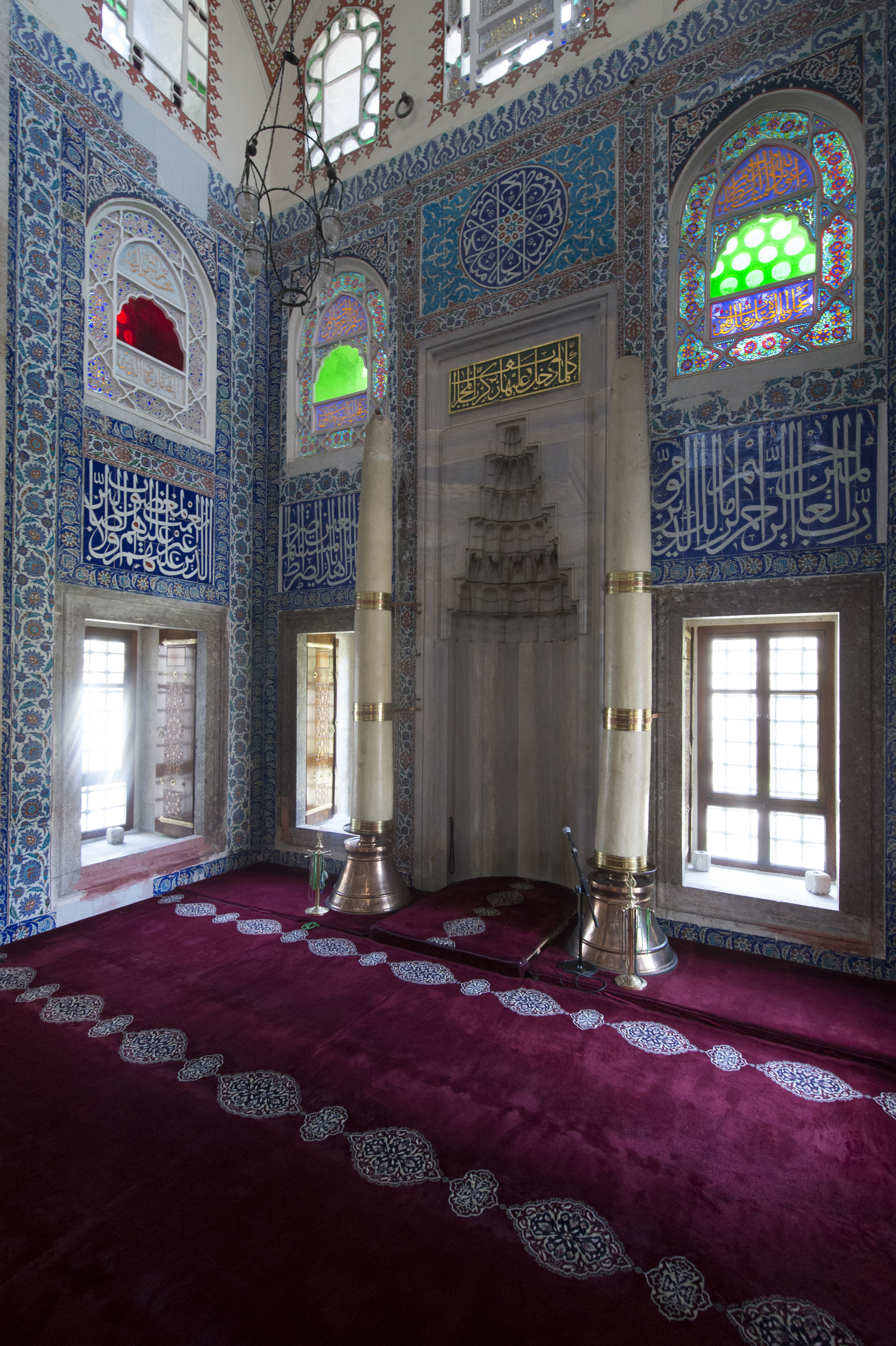
Kilic Ali Pasha Mosque mihrab from side

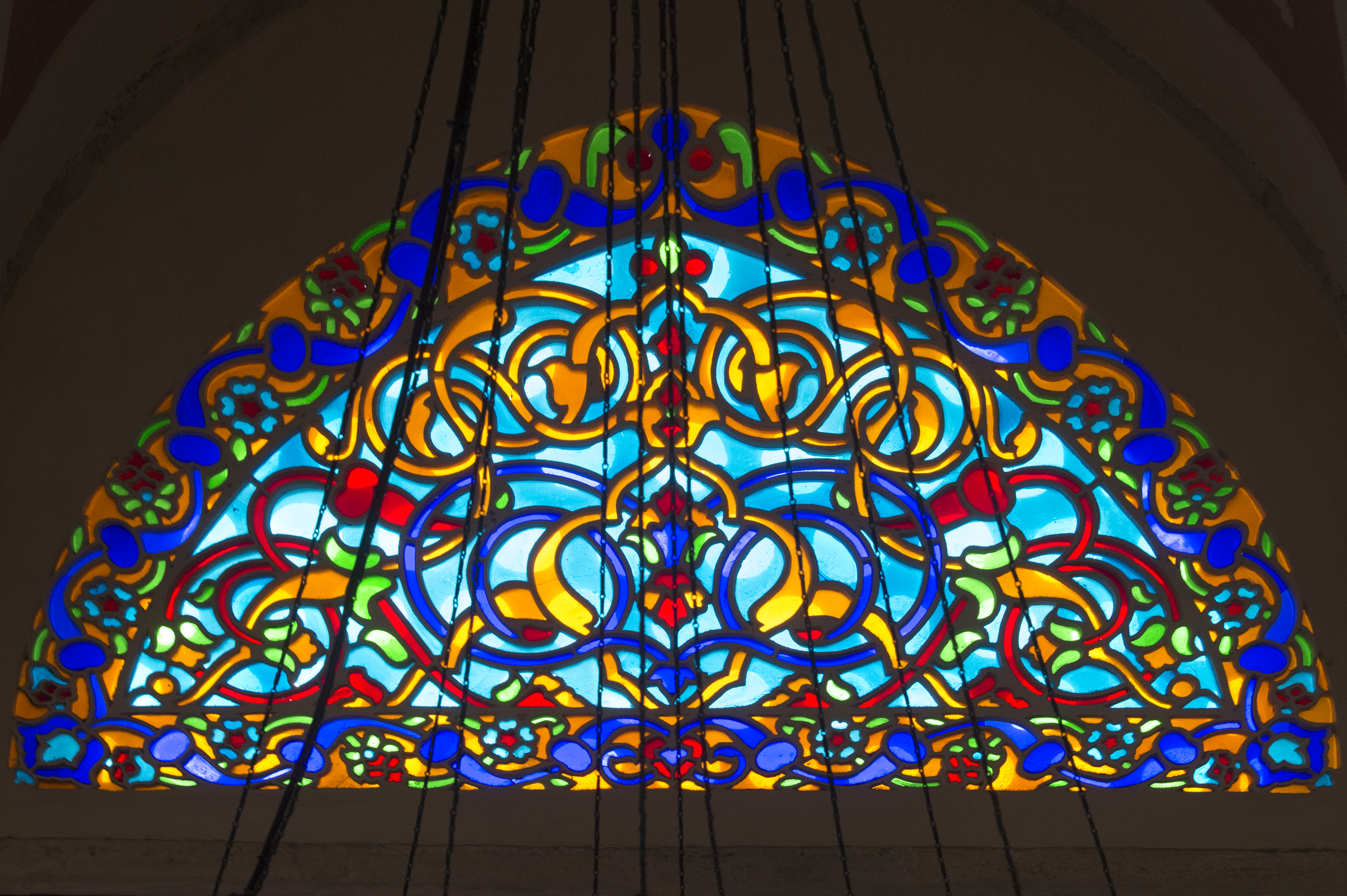
Kilic Ali Pasha Mosque window

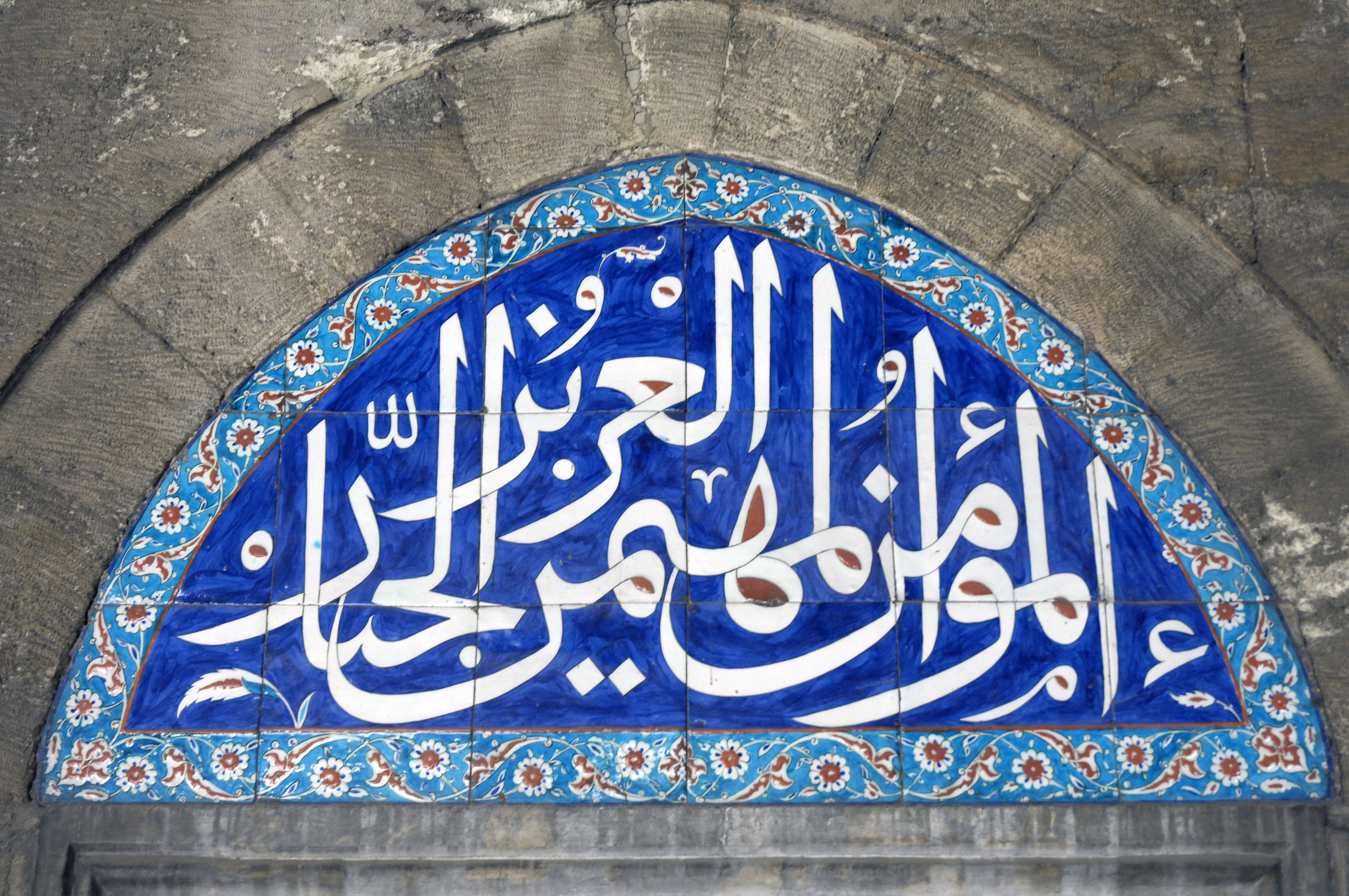
Kilic Ali Pasha Mosque calligraphic tiles

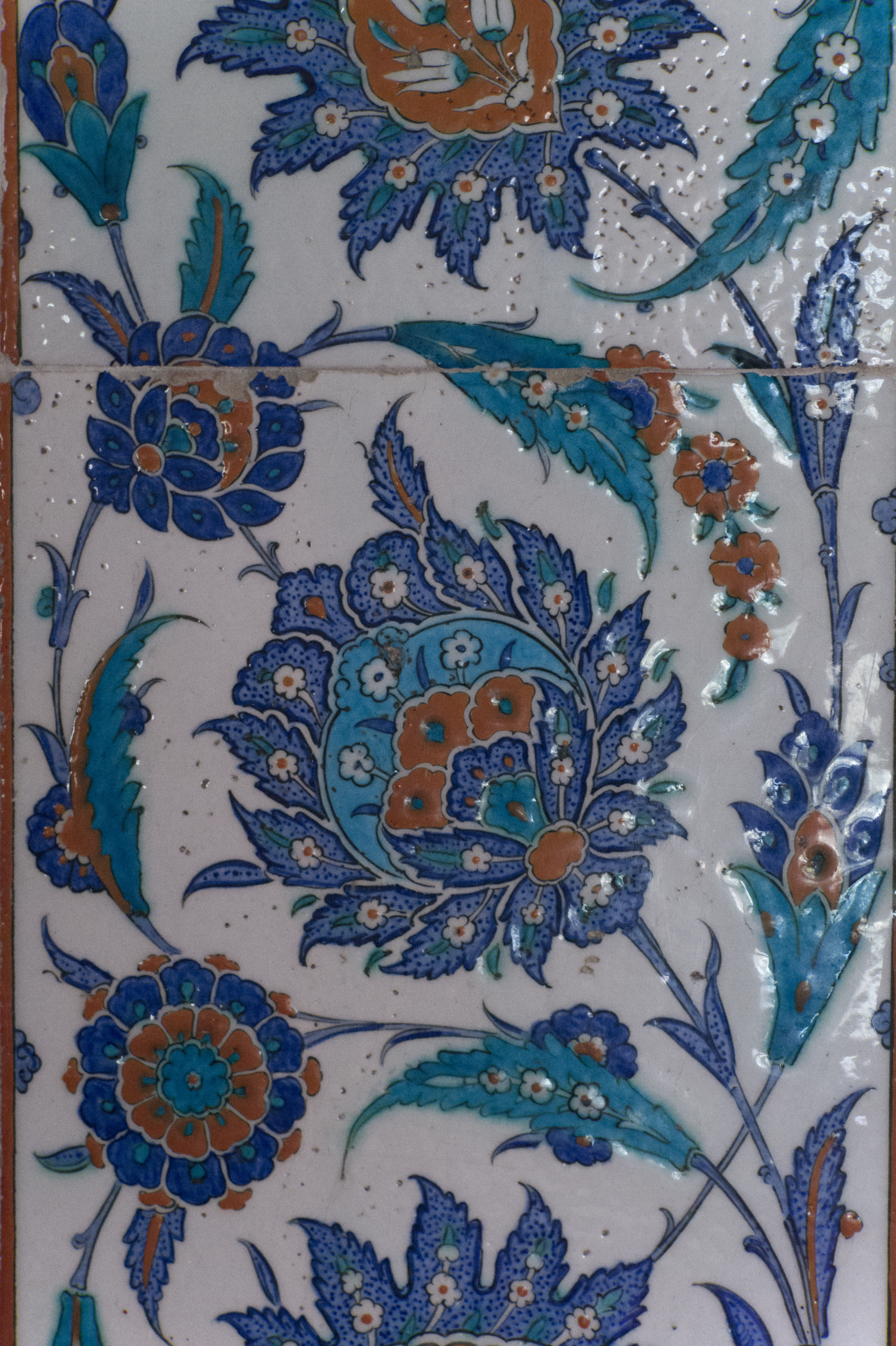
Kilic Ali Pasha Mosque tiles

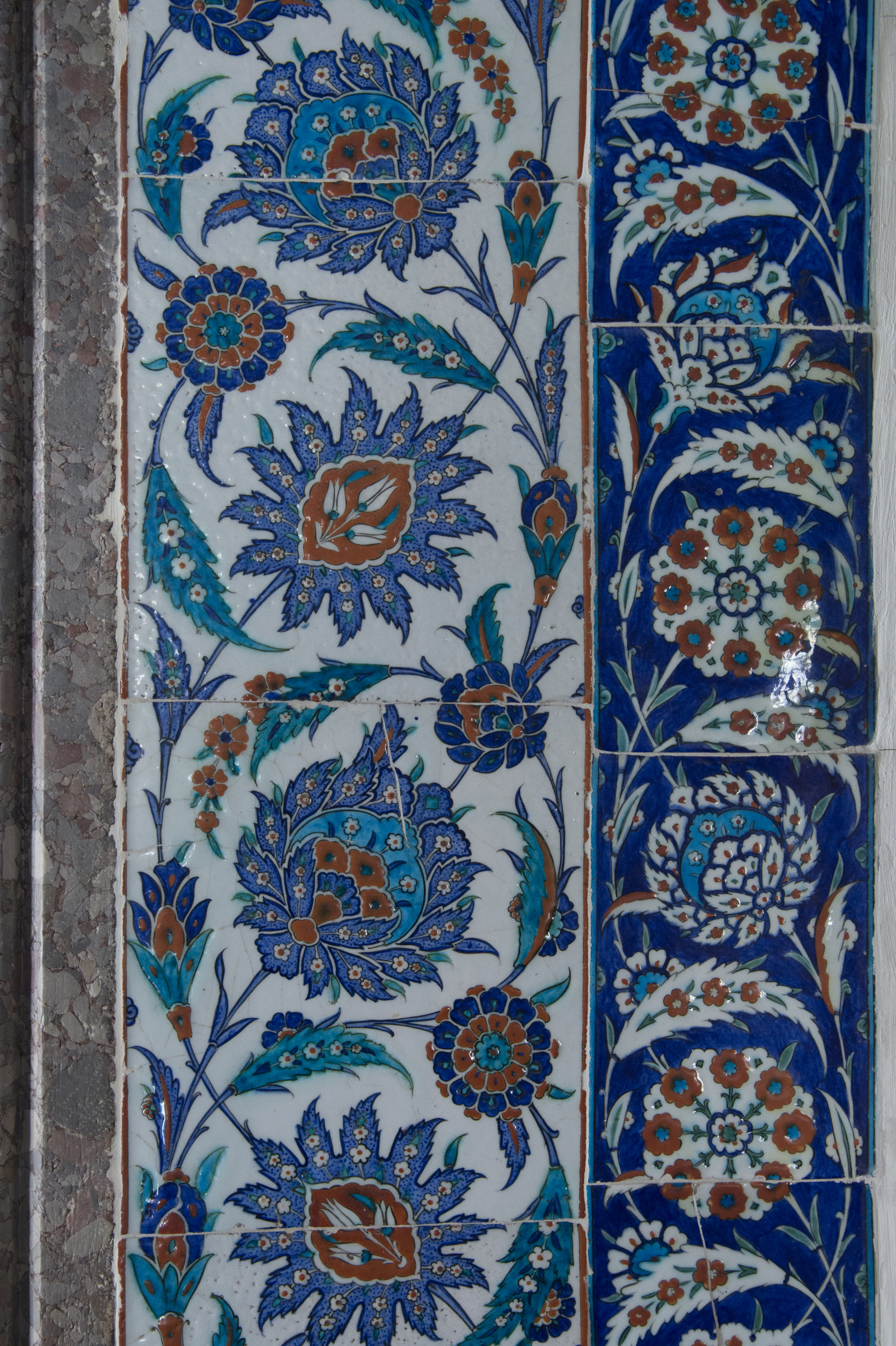
Kilic Ali Pasha Mosque tiles

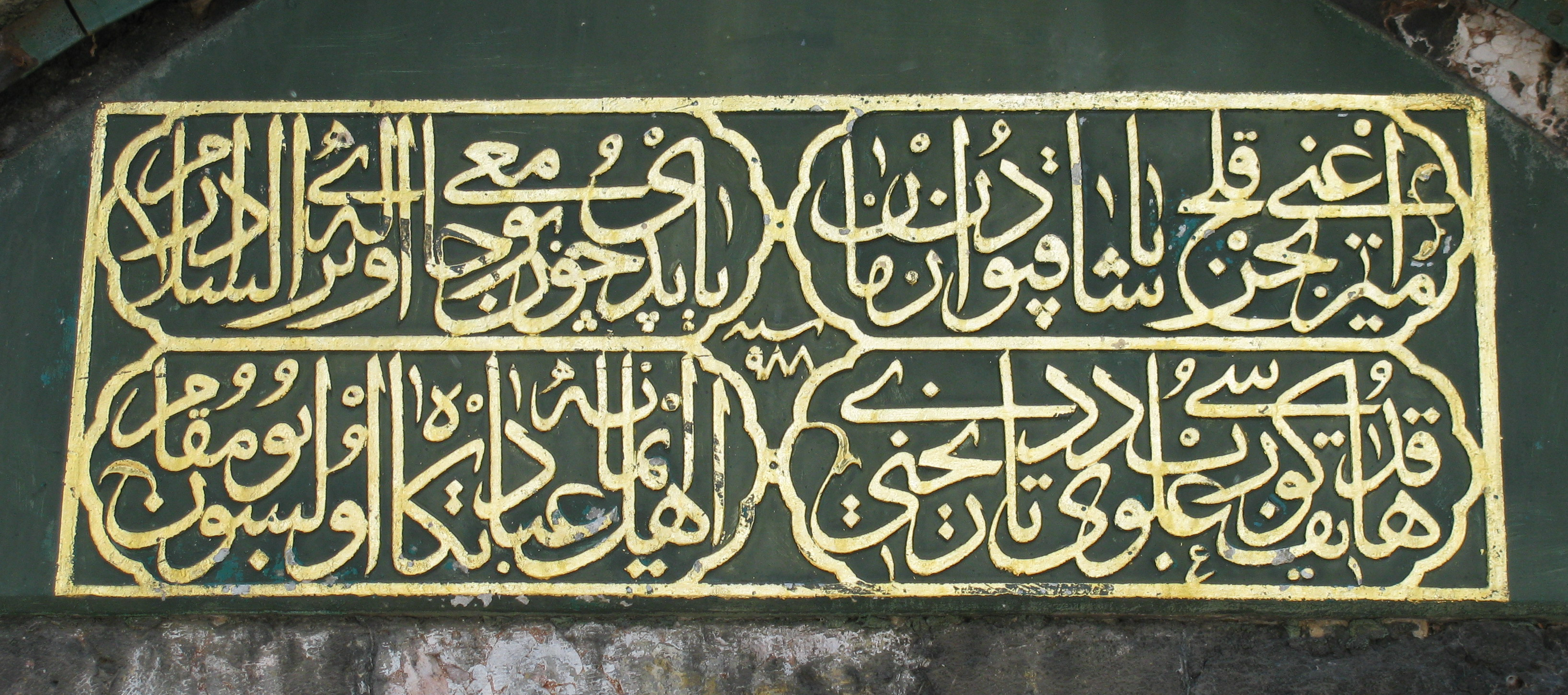
Kılıç Ali Paşa chronogram

== Stories associated with the mosque ==
After an examination of the complex's foundation documents, the Turkish researcher Rasih Nuri İleri claimed that the Spanish writer Miguel de Cervantes had been a slave during its construction, like the captive character in his novel Don Quixote.

When Kılıç Ali Pasha decided to endow a mosque toward the end of his life, he applied to the state for a grant of land (all land in the Ottoman Empire belonged to the state). He and the Grand Vizier Rüstem Pasha disliked each other intensely, so the Vizier is reported to have said: "Since he is the admiral, let him build his mosque on the sea." Undeterred, Kılıç Ali Pasha had rocks brought from all over the region and built the mosque on an artificial island connected to the mainland by a narrow causeway. The mosque is now well inland, since the water was filled in during the construction of a modern port.

== See also ==
- List of Friday mosques designed by Mimar Sinan
