= Samson Rowlie =

Chief Eunuch and Treasurer of Algiers during Ottoman rule

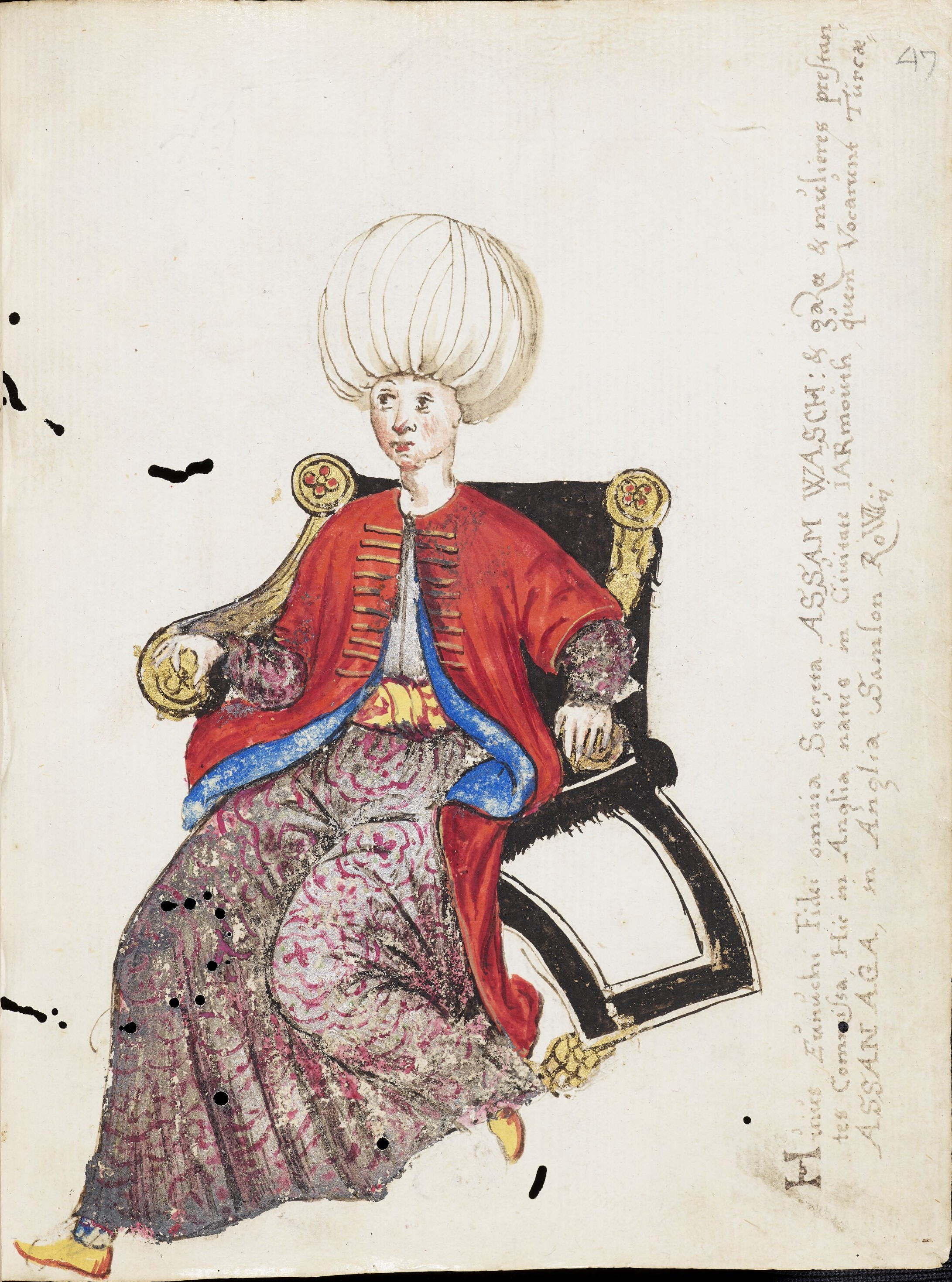
Portrait of Samson Rowlie/Hassan Aga

Samson Rowlie (died after 1588) was Chief Eunuch and Treasurer of Algiers during Ottoman rule. Born in Norfolk, England, the son of a Bristol merchant, Francis Rowlie, he was captured aboard of the Swallow and castrated by the Ottomans in 1577. He converted from Christianity to Islam and took the name Hassan Aga. He served the Beylerbey of Algiers, Uluç Ali Pasha.

Richard Hakluyt's 1589 collection, The Principal Navigations, included a 1586 letter from William Harborne, England's ambassador to the Ottoman court, addressed to Hassan Aga, for the purpose of negotiating prisoner release. A 1588 watercolor portrait depicts Hassan Aga with white skin and rosy cheeks, wearing a large turban. He was reported to have been murdered.
