= Occhiali =

Italian-born Ottoman privateer and admiral (1519–1587)

Uluj Ali Pasha
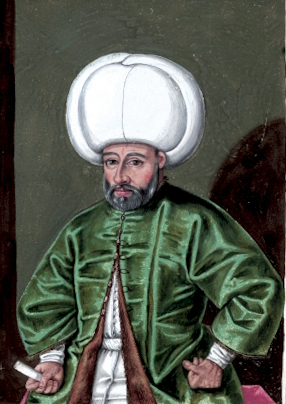
- Giovan Dionigi Galeni, alias Ali Kilic Pasha (1519-1587), by Johannes Leunclavius in 1586. Oesterreichische Nationalbibliothek

Grand Admiral of the Ottoman Fleet
- In office 28 October 1571 – 25 June 1587
- Monarchs: Selim II and Murad III
- Preceded by: Müezzinzade Ali Pasha
- Succeeded by: Damad Ibrahim Pasha

Beylerbey of Algiers
- In office June 1568 – May 1577
- Monarch: Selim II
- Preceded by: Mehmed Pasha
- Succeeded by: Hassan Veneziano

Beylerbey of Tripoli
- In office 1565–1568
- Monarchs: Suleiman I and Selim II
- Preceded by: Dragut
- Succeeded by: Yahya Pasha

Personal details
- Born: Giovanni Dionigi Galeni c. 1519 Le Castella, Isola di Capo Rizzuto, Kingdom of Naples, Crown of Aragon (present-day Italy)
- Died: 25 June 1587 (aged 67–68) Istanbul, Ottoman Empire (present-day Turkey)
- Resting place: Kılıç Ali Pasha Complex
- Citizenship: Ottoman
- Spouse: Selime Hatun
- Occupation: Mariner and Sailor
- Ethnicity: Calabrian
- Nickname(s): Uluj Ali, Uluç Ali, Ulucciali, Uccialì, Occhiali, Occhialì, Luccialì, Uluch-Alì, Uchali, Euldj Ali, Ali Pasha

Military service
- Allegiance: Ottoman Empire; Regency of Algiers; Ottoman Tripolitania
- Branch/service: Ottoman Navy
- Years of service: c. 1536–1587
- Rank: Grand Admiral
- Battles/wars: Siege of Tripoli; Battle of Djerba; Action of 1570; Ottoman–Venetian War • Battle of Gozo • Battle of Lepanto • Skirmish at Cerigo Channel • Siege of Navarino; Conquest of Tunis; Battle of Goleta

Occhiali (Note: Italian: Occhialì [okkjaˈli], Uccialì [uttʃaˈli] or Luccialì.) (born Giovanni Dionigi (Note: Also Giovan Dionigi o Gian Dionigi.) Galeni; c. 1519 – 21 June 1587), also known as Uluj Ali, was an Italian privateer and admiral who served as the commander of the Regency of Algiers and Grand Admiral (Kapudan Pasha) of the Ottoman fleet.

Born Giovanni Dionigi Galeni, he was also known by several other names in the Christian countries of the Mediterranean and in the literature also appears under various names. Miguel de Cervantes called him Uchali in chapter XXXIX of his Don Quixote de la Mancha. Elsewhere he was simply called Ali Pasha. John Wolf, in his The Barbary Coast, refers to him as Euldj Ali.

== Early life ==
Giovanni Dionigi Galeni was born to the seaman Birno Galeni and his wife Pippa de Cicco, in the village of Le Castella (near modern Isola di Capo Rizzuto) in Calabria, Kingdom of Naples. His father wanted him to receive a religious education, but on 29 April 1536, when he was about 17, Giovanni was captured by Ali Ahmed, one of the corsair captains of Barbarossa Hayreddin Pasha, and was forced to serve as a galley slave. As an oar slave in an Ottoman galley, he participated in the Battle of Preveza in 1538. Within a few years, he converted to Islam and became a corsair in the fleet of Turgut Reis by 1541. This was not unusual at the time as many Muslim corsairs (privateers) were captured slaves who converted to Islam.

He was a very able mariner and soon rose in the ranks, gaining sufficient prize booty to buy a share in a corsair brigantine sailing out of Algiers. Further success soon enabled him to become the captain and owner of a galley, and he gained a reputation as one of the boldest corsair reis on the Barbary Coast. Uluj Ali was in the fleet of Turgut Reis, one of the most famous corsairs in the Mediterranean, as well as an Ottoman admiral and Bey of Tripoli. Sailing with Turgut Reis, he also impressed the Ottoman admiral Piyale Pasha, with whom Turgut joined forces on a number of occasions. Due to his success in battles, the administration of the island of Samos in the Aegean Sea was awarded to him in 1550. In 1560, he was among the forces of Turgut Reis and Piyale Pasha during the Battle of Djerba. In 1565 he was promoted to the rank of Beylerbey (Chief Governor) of Alexandria. The same year he joined the Siege of Malta with the Ottoman Egyptian fleet, and when Turgut Reis was killed during the siege, Piyale Pasha appointed Uluj Ali as Turgut's successor as Bey of Tripoli. Uluj took Turgut's body to Tripoli for burial, assumed control of the province, and was subsequently confirmed as Pasha of Tripoli by Sultan Suleiman I. In the following years he conducted numerous raids on the coasts of Sicily, Calabria and Naples.

== Pasha of Algiers ==
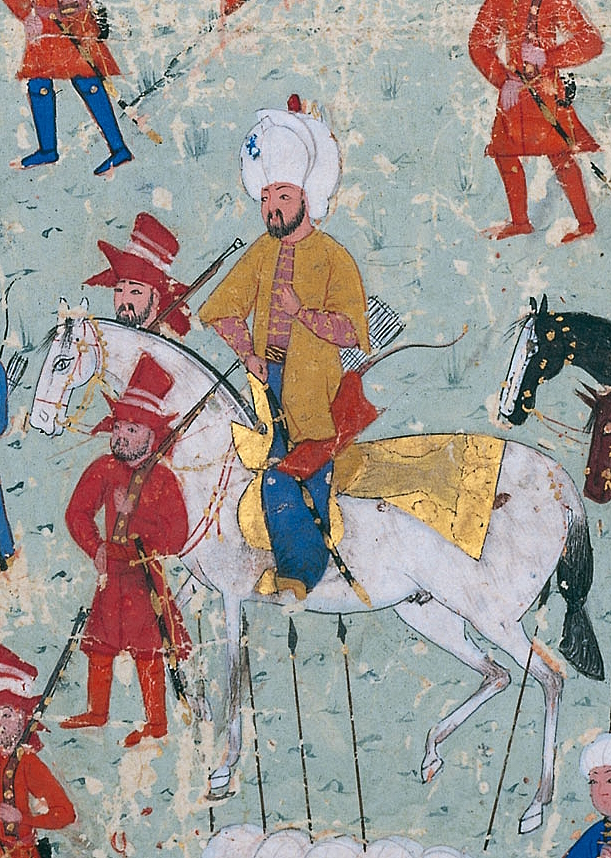
Uluç Ali,Pasha of Algiers, leading troops in the Capture of Tunis (1569). Şahname-ı Selim Han, 1581

In March 1568, the vice-regency of Algiers fell vacant, and upon the recommendation of Piyale Pasha, Sultan Selim II appointed Uluj Ali to become the Pasha and Beylerbey of Algiers, the most powerful of the increasingly autonomous Ottoman eyalets in North Africa, which were governed by the corsair-admirals appointed by the Sultan. In October 1569 he turned upon the Hafsid Sultan Moulay Ahmad of Tunis, who had been restored to his throne by Spain. Marching overland with an army of some 5000, he quickly sent Hamid and his forces fleeing and made himself ruler of Tunis. Hamid found refuge in the Spanish fort at La Goulette outside Tunis.

In July 1570, while ostensibly en route to Constantinople to ask the Sultan for more ships and men in order to evict the Spaniards from all of North Africa, Uluj Ali encountered five Maltese galleys, commanded by Francisco de Sant Clement, then the captain-general of the Order's galleys, near Cape Passaro in Sicily and captured four of them in the action of 1570. (Sant Clement escaped, but on returning to Malta was condemned, strangled and his body put in a sack and dumped into the harbor.) This victory caused Uluj to change his mind and return to Algiers in order to celebrate. There, in early 1571, he was faced with a mutiny of the janissaries who demanded overdue pay. He decided to put to sea, leaving the mutinous soldiers to take their pay from anyone they could find and rob. Having learned of the presence of a large Ottoman fleet at Coron in the Morea, he decided to join it. It was the fleet commanded by Müezzinzade Ali Pasha that was to meet disaster at Lepanto a few months later.

the remaining Muslims of southern Spain, whether those who remained faithful to their religion or those who outwardly converted to Christianity, to prepare to revolt against Spanish rule. They wrote to Kilic Ali seeking aid and support. They set a date for declaring the revolution on the Day of the Synod of Saints (November 1). Kilic Ali Pasha assembled a great army of 14,000 men of riflemen, along with sixty thousand Algerian mujahideen, from kilic Ali pasha resolved to send new reinforcements to the Muslims of Andalusia, and managed to land four thousand Algerian mujahideen during October of that year, including riflemen, and a large quantity of ammunition. Some of the veteran Ottoman mujahideen also died, to serve as cadres in managing the battles. In the following year, 1570, the Algerians sent new reinforcements of men and weapons to aid the Andalusian revolt. Kilij Ali Pasha wanted to go himself to lead the jihad there. However, the widespread news of the Christian fleets gathering and preparing for a decisive battle against the Muslims, and the Sultan's order for him to prepare to participate in this great epic, forced him to remain in Algiers, awaiting developments.

== Lepanto ==
On 7 October 1571, Uluj Ali commanded the left flank of Ali Pasha's fleet in the Battle of Lepanto. He kept his squadron together in the melee, outmaneuvered his direct opponent, Giovanni Andrea Doria, and captured the flagship of the Maltese Knights with its great banner. When the Ottoman defeat became obvious, he succeeded in extricating his ships, and gathered up the scattered remaining ships of the Ottoman fleet (some forty galleys and fustas) and others along the way to Constantinople, where he arrived with 87 vessels. There he presented the great flag of the Knights of Malta to Sultan Selim II, who gave him the honorary title of Kılıç ("Sword") and on 29 October 1571 appointed him as Kapudan Pasha (Grand Admiral) and Beylerbey of the Isles. He was subsequently known as Kılıç Ali Pasha.

== Kapudan Pasha (1572–1587) ==
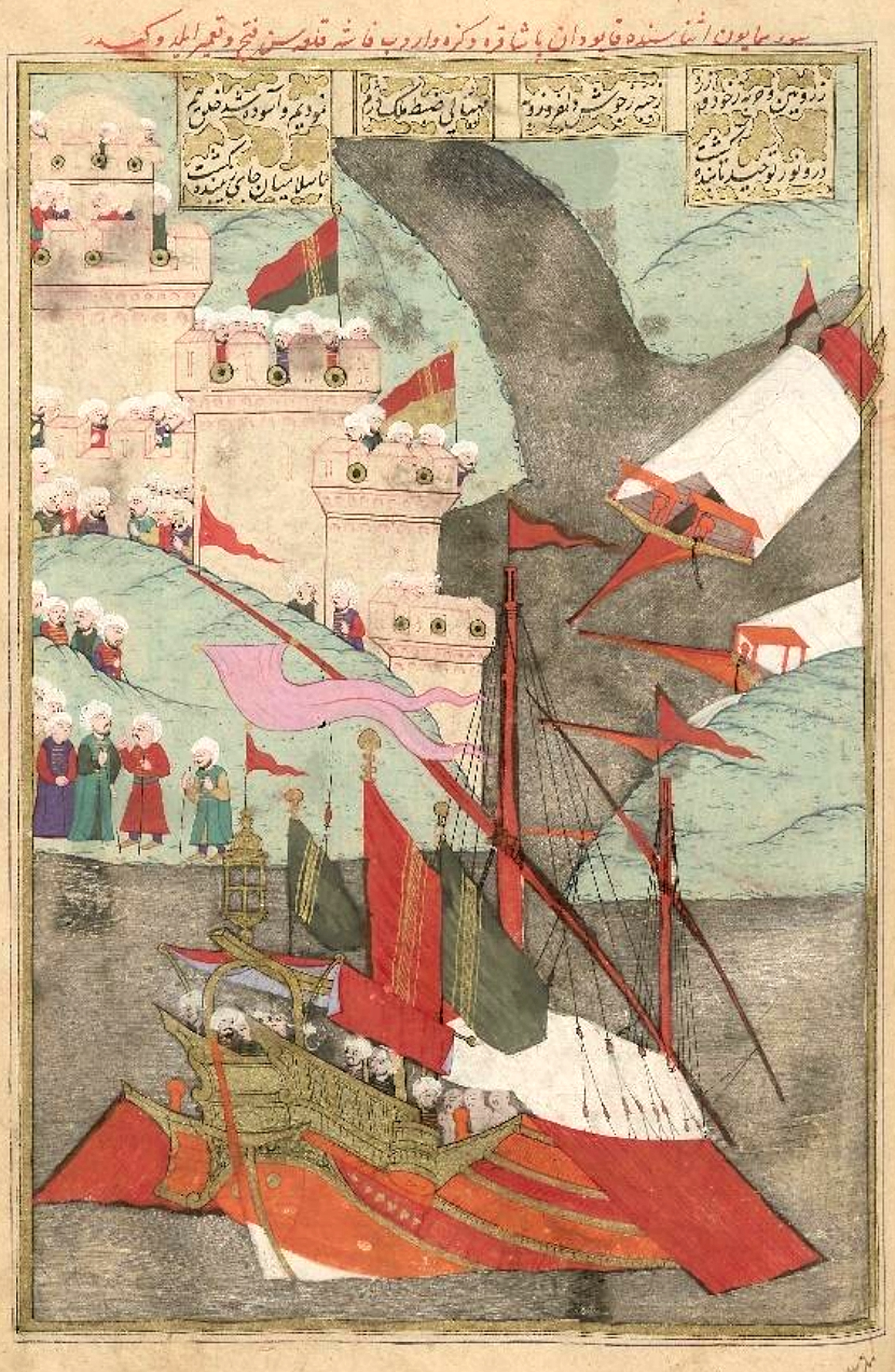
Ali Pasha's conquest of Faş Castle and repair of the castle in 1578-1579. Şahanşahname (TSKM B.200, 1592)

Piyale Pasha and Kılıç Ali Pasha immediately began to rebuild the Ottoman fleet. Kılıç Ali Pasha placed special emphasis on the construction of a number of heavier ships modeled upon the Venetian galleasses, heavier artillery for the galleys, and firearms for the soldiers on board. In June 1572, now Kapudan Pasha, he set out with 250 galleys and a large number of smaller ships to seek revenge for Lepanto. He found the Christian fleet anchored in an inlet of Morea, but his strategy of trying to lure the enemy out and inflicting damage through repeated quick thrusts meant that a full-fledged battle never materialized because the Christian fleet was too cautious to be trapped and encircled.

In 1573 Kılıç Ali Pasha commanded the naval campaign on the coasts of Italy. In that same year, the regency of Algiers was transferred to Arab Ahmed, and Don Juan of Austria, the victor of Lepanto, recaptured Tunis. In July 1574, Kılıç Ali Pasha sailed to Tunis with a fleet of 250 galleys and a large army under the command of Cığalazade Yusuf Sinan Pasha, captured the port fortress of La Goulette on 25 August 1574, and the city of Tunis on 13 September 1574. During this expedition, on 26 July 1574, the forces of Kılıç Ali Pasha constructed an Ottoman fortress on the coastline of Morocco, facing Andalusia in mainland Spain.

In 1576 he raided Calabria and in 1578 put down another mutiny of the janissaries in Algiers who had assassinated Arab Ahmed.

In 1578-79, Ali Pasha participated to the offensive of the Ottoman–Safavid War (1578–1590), capturing and reinforcing the Georgian fortress of Farş.

In 1584 he commanded a naval expedition to Crimea for the Crimean campaign (1584).

In 1585 he put down revolts in Syria and Lebanon with the Ottoman Egyptian fleet based in Alexandria.

Kılıç Ali Pasha died on 21 June 1587 in Constantinople (Istanbul). He is buried at the Kılıç Ali Paşa Mosque (1580), designed by the Ottoman chief architect Mimar Sinan.

== Legacy ==
- He built the Kılıç Ali Paşa Mosque (1580) and Baths (1583) in Istanbul.
- Several warships and submarines of the Turkish Navy have been named after him (see Kılıç class fast attack missile boat and Oruç Reis-class submarine).
- His statue is in the center square of Le Castella in Calabria, Italy, where he was born.
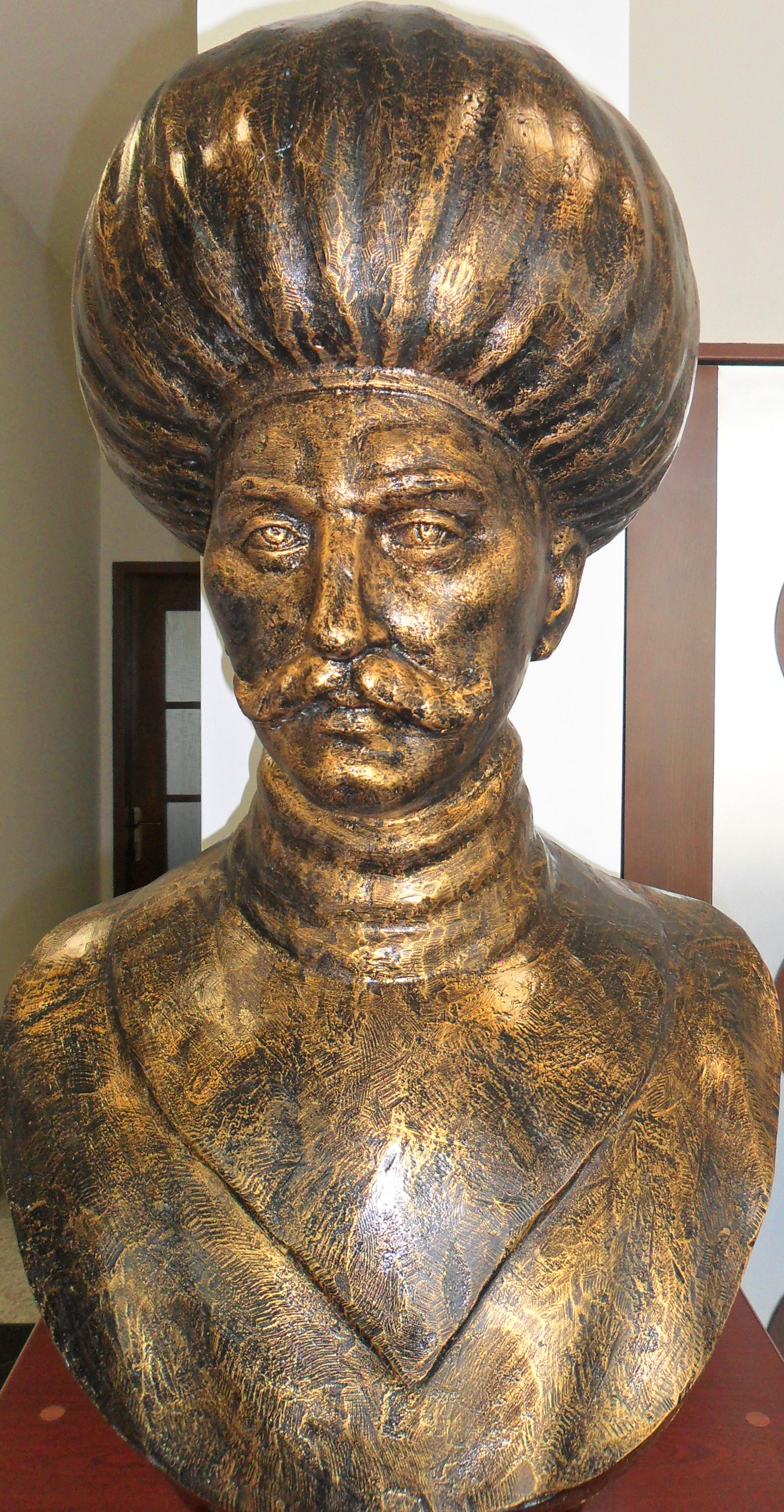
Uluç Ali Reis bust at the Mersin Naval Museum.

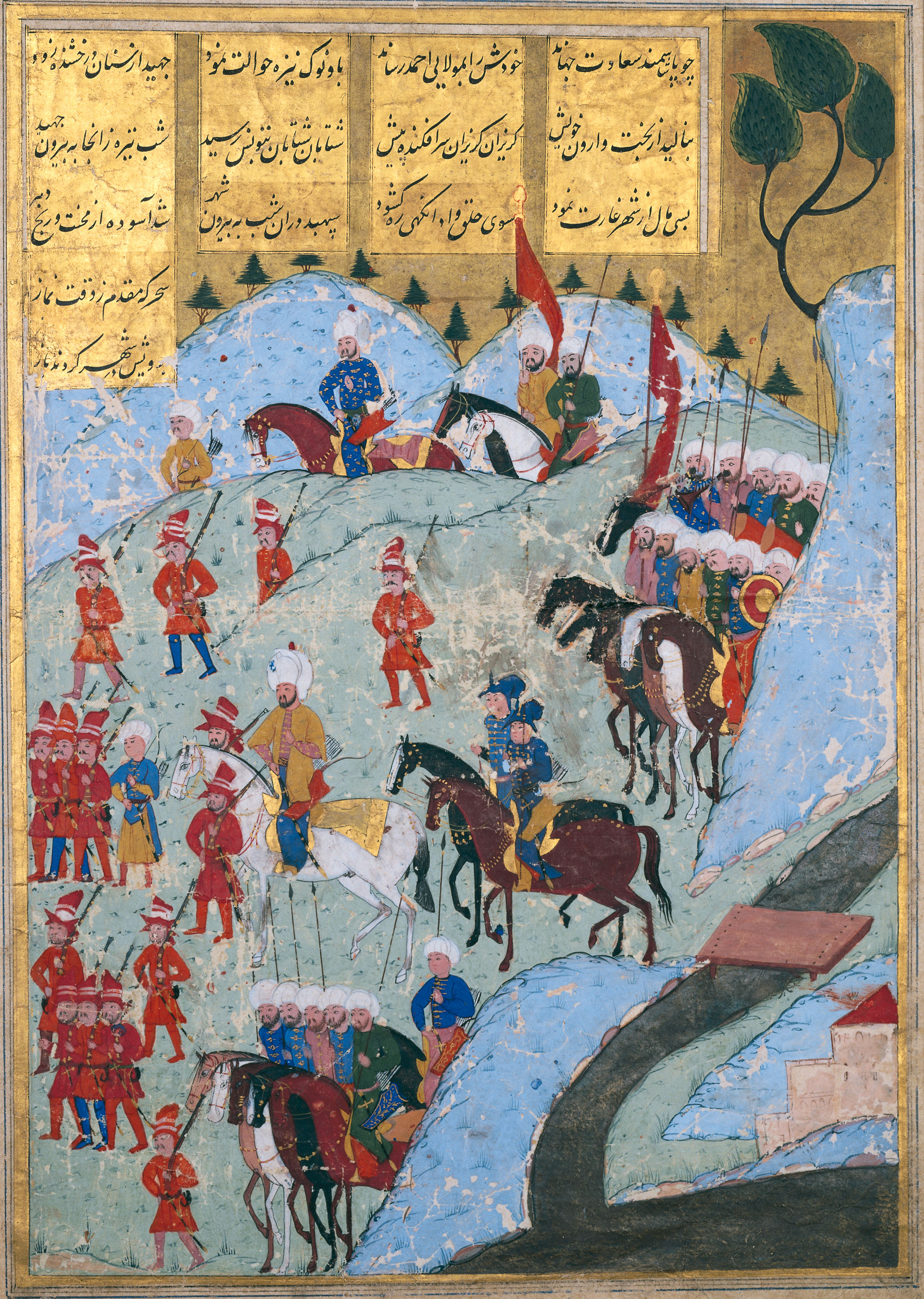
Ottoman troops (about 5,000 janissaries) led by Uluj Ali, then Pasha of Algiers, marching on Tunis in 1569.

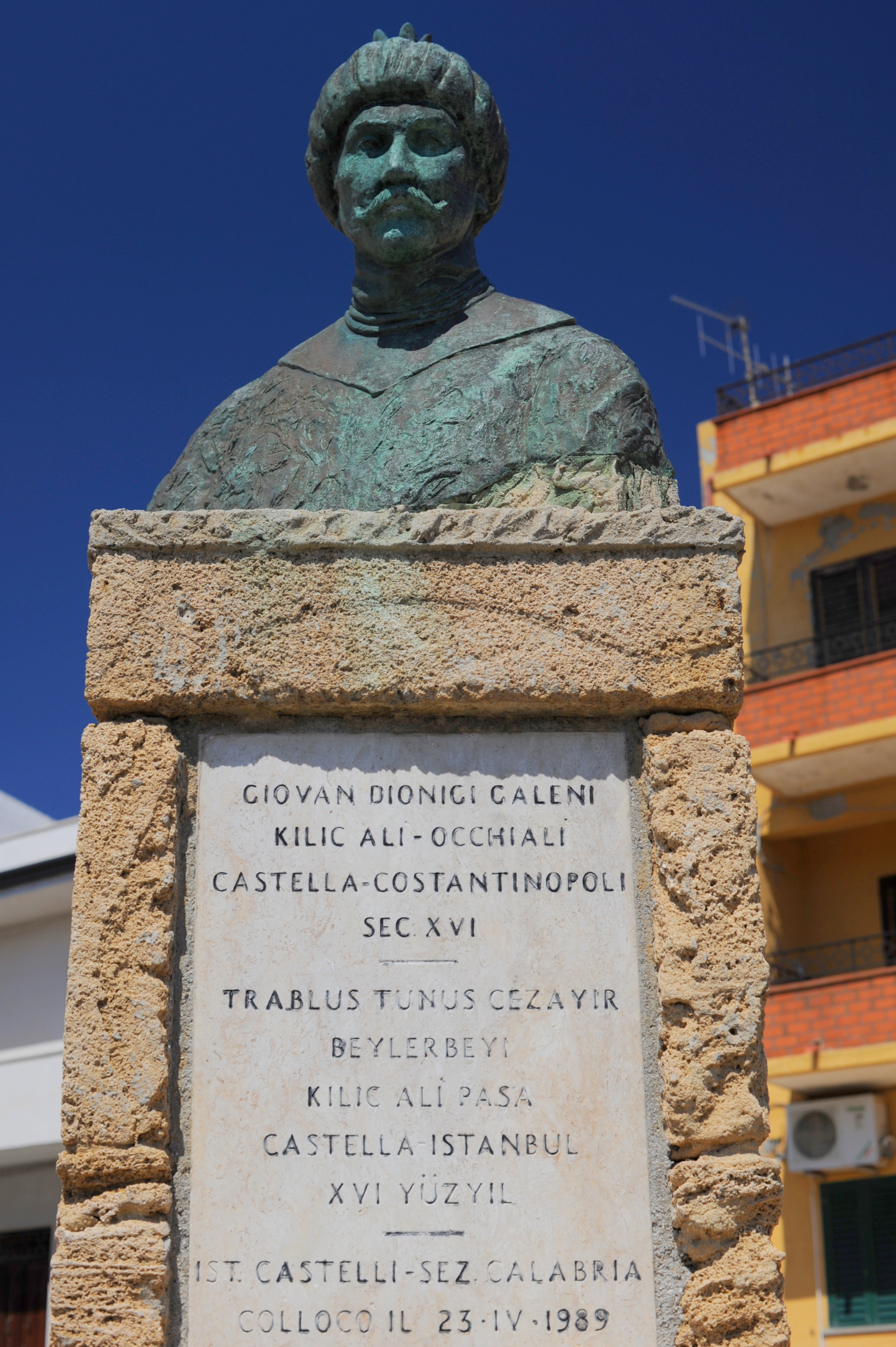
Statue of Uluj Ali in his hometown of Le Castella, Italy.

== See also ==
- Ottoman Navy
- Samson Rowlie (Hassan Aga), a captured Englishman who served as a eunuch for Occhiali

== Sources ==
- Miguel de Cervantes, in chapter XXXIX of his classic El Ingenioso Hidalgo Don Quijote de la Mancha, mentions Uluç Ali under the name of "Uchali", describing briefly his rise to the regency of Algiers.
- John B. Wolf, The Barbary Coast: Algeria under the Turks, W.W. Norton, New York/London, 1979, ISBN 0-393-01205-0.
- Hugh Bicheno, Crescent and Cross: The Battle of Lepanto 1571, Phoenix Paperback, 2004, ISBN 1-84212-753-5
- E. Hamilton Currey, Sea-Wolves of the Mediterranean, London, 1910
- Bono, Salvatore: Corsari nel Mediterraneo (Corsairs in the Mediterranean), Oscar Storia Mondadori. Perugia, 1993.
- Corsari nel Mediterraneo: Condottieri di ventura. Online database in Italian, based on Salvatore Bono's book.
- Bradford, Ernle, The Sultan's Admiral: The life of Barbarossa, London, 1968.
- The Ottomans: Comprehensive and detailed online chronology of Ottoman history in English.
- Turkish Navy official website: Historic heritage of the Turkish Navy (in Turkish)

Preceded by Muhammad I Pasha	Pasha of Algiers; 1568–1571	Succeeded by Arab Ahmed Pasha
