= Sirocco (disambiguation) =

The Sirocco is a hot, fast Mediterranean wind.

Sirocco or Siroco may also refer to:

== Arts and entertainment ==
- Sirocco (1938 film), a French drama film directed by Pierre Chenal
- Sirocco (1951 film), an American war film starring Humphrey Bogart
- Sirocco (play), a play by Noël Coward
- Sirocco (band), an Australian band
- Sirocco (album) by Australian Crawl
- Siroco (album) by Paco de Lucia

== Naval vessels ==
- French ship Siroco, several ships
- HMAS Sirocco, a Royal Australian Navy patrol boat
- Spanish submarine Siroco (S-72), a Spanish Navy submarine
- USS Sirocco, a United States Navy patrol ship

== Transportation ==
- Aviasud Sirocco, a French ultra-light aircraft
  - AC Sirocco nG, an updated model
- Sirocco, the name of a Lackawanna Railroad train car involved in the Rockport train wreck

== Other uses ==
- Mahomet Sirocco (1525–1571), Ottoman bey and admiral
- Sirocco (parrot), a famous kākāpō
- Sirocco (restaurant), atop the State Tower in Bangkok, Thailand
- Sirocco, codename for the S1 Core, an open source hardware microprocessor design
- Sirocco, a model of the Nokia 8800 mobile phone and revived more recently for the Nokia 8 Sirocco
- Sirocco Works, an engineering, ropeworks, and ventilation company in Northern Ireland
- Sirocco Works F.C., a football club in Northern Ireland
- SIROCCO, abbreviation for the academic conference International Colloquium on Structural Information and Communication Complexity
- Sirocco, a type of forward curved centrifugal fan developed by Samuel Cleland Davidson

== See also ==
- Scirocco (disambiguation)
- Shirocco, a German thoroughbred racehorse
