= Portrait of Agostino Barbarigo =

Painting by Paolo Veronese

- Year: c. 1571
- Medium: Oil on canvas
- Dimensions: 102.2 cm (40.2 in) × 104.2 cm (41.0 in)

Portrait of Agostino Barbarigo is an oil painting on canvas by Paolo Veronese, from 1571-1572. It is held in the Cleveland Museum of Art, which bought it in 1928 from Italico Brass.

Its subject is Agostino Barbarigo, admiral of the Venetian fleet in Lepanto. In the famous naval battle, Barbarigo was killed by an arrow, an event alluded to by the dart that the Venetian admiral is holding in his hand. He wears an armor and appears in a thoughtful pose. The red drapery behind him can be interpreted as an allusion to his death,

== Bibliography ==
- Cocke, Richard (2017-10-05). Paolo Veronese: Piety and Display in an Age of Religious Reform. Routledge. ISBN 978-1-351-80573-5.
- Pignatti, Terisio (1979). The golden century of Venetian painting. Los Angeles County Museum of Art. ISBN 9780875870885.
- Art, Cleveland Museum of (1974). Catalogue of Paintings: European paintings of the 16th, 17th, and 18th centuries. The Museum. ISBN 978-0-910386-66-1.
