= Aviasud Mistral =

Mistral
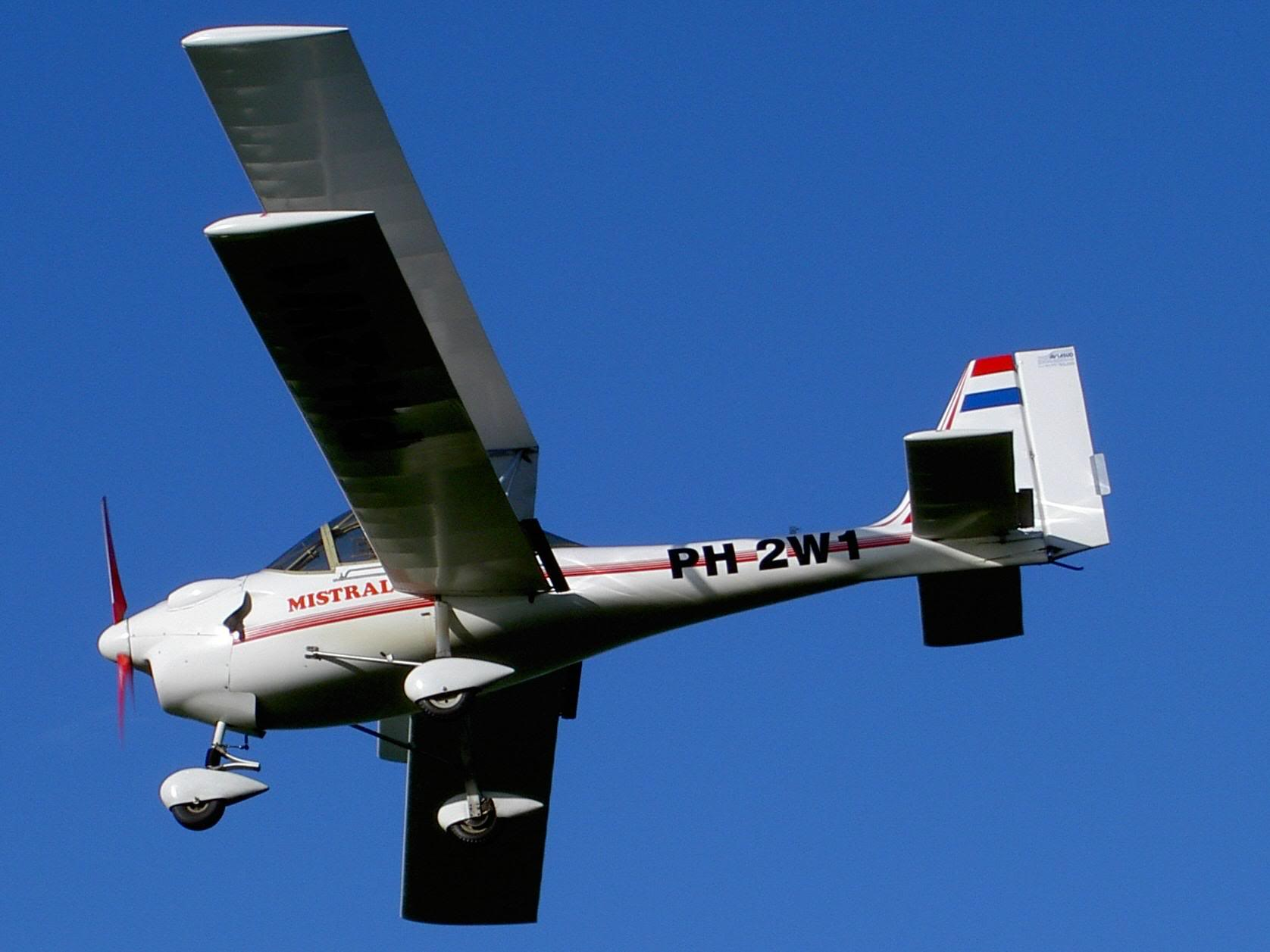

General information
- Type: Ultralight biplane
- National origin: France
- Manufacturer: Aviasud Engineering
- Number built: 250+ (1999)

History
- Introduction date: 1986
- First flight: 1985

The Aviasud Mistral is a French two-seat ultralight biplane built by Aviasud Engineering. This plane is notable as it has forward swept wings and side-by-side seating. The lower wings are movable and are used as the roll control (wing leveler).

The aeroplane (along with the Sirocco) was taken over, and is still supported by, Aériane in 1989.

== Design and development ==
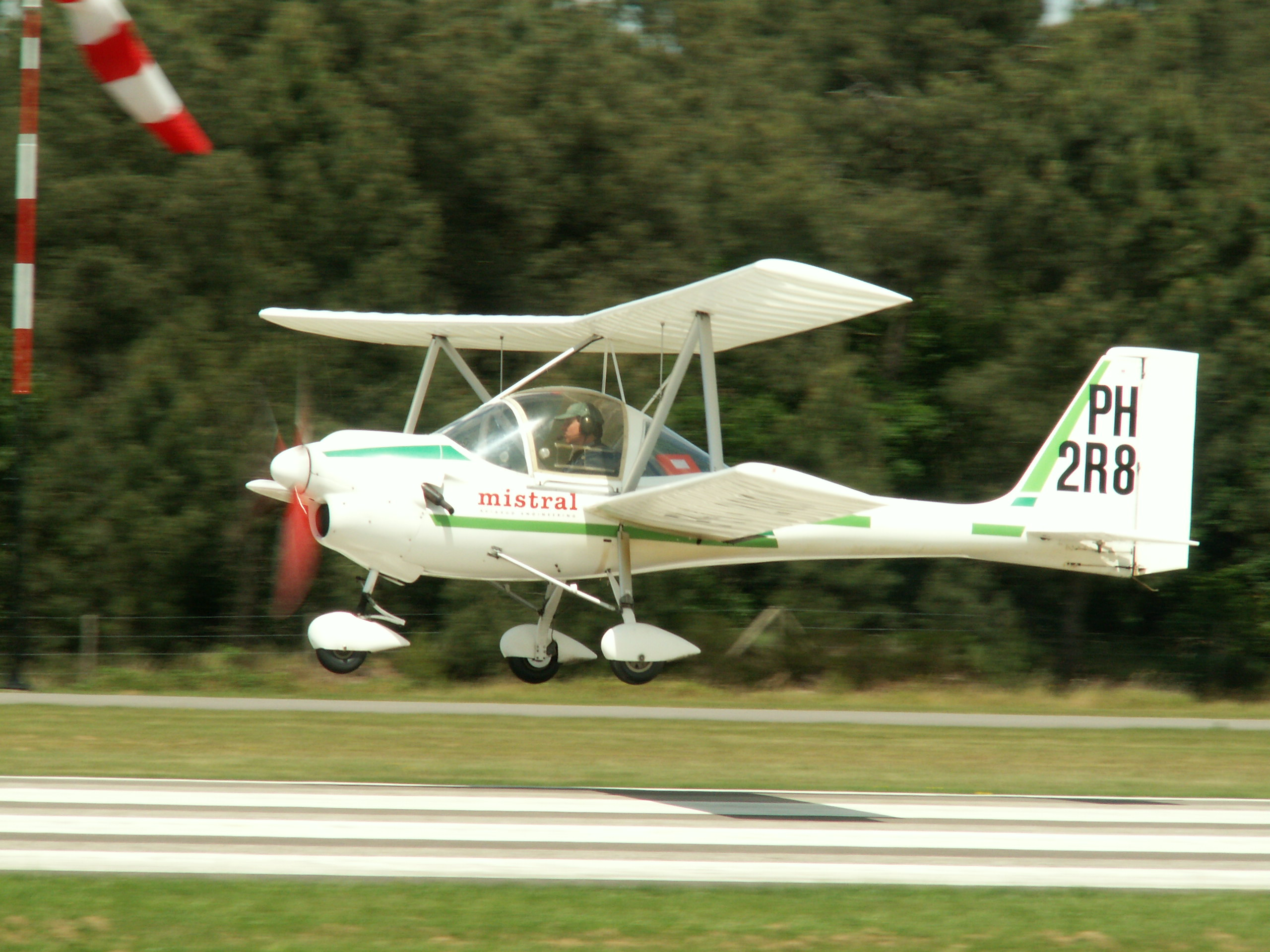
The Aviasud Mistral has a biplane configuration

The Aviasud Mistral was designed by two Belgian engineers, Francois Goethals and Bernard d'Otreppe.

The prototype first flew in May 1985, and the aircraft entered production with AviaSud engineering in Fréjus, with the first production model having its maiden flight in February 1986. Aviasud has built more than 200 Mistrals, it has also been built by Ultraleger Industria Aeronáutica Ltda in Brasil.

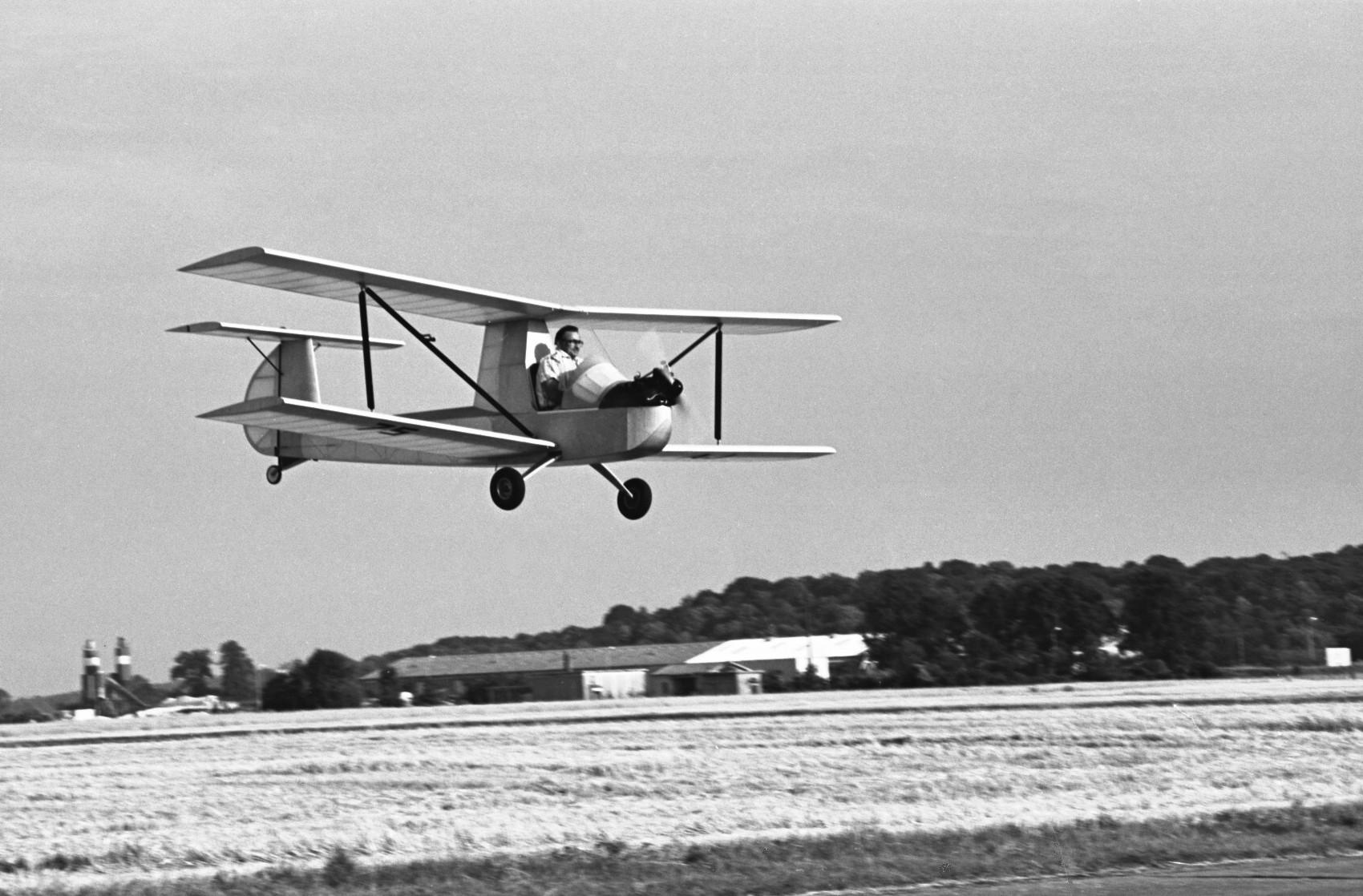
The unidentified 3-axis ULM which was the basis for the Mistral

The Mistral is a biplane of mixed wooden and composite construction, with forward swept wings, with the all-moving lower wings used as large ailerons, and a conventional, all-moving tailplane. It has a fixed tricycle landing gear and a nose-mounted Rotax piston engine. The Mistral has an enclosed cockpit with two side-by-side seats forward of the wings.

On May 4, 1987, an Aviasud Mistral was flown to the geographic North Pole by Nicolas Hulot, a world first for this type of aircraft.

== Variants ==
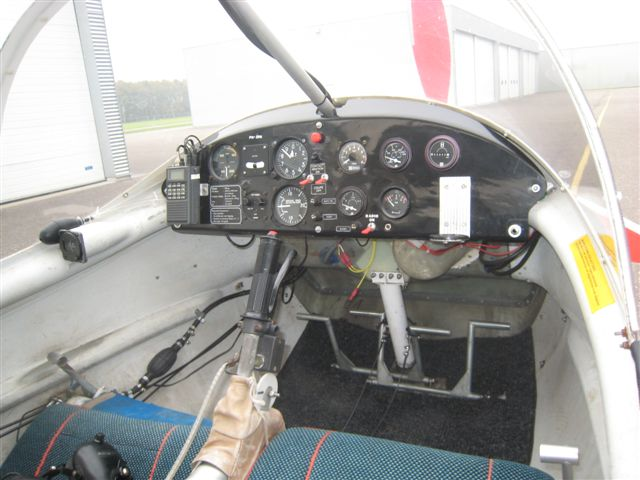
Cockpit of the Aviasud Mistral

Mistral
Original version with 47 kW Rotax 532 engine.
Mistral 503
Low powered, economy version with 37 kW (50 hp) Rotax 503 engine.
AE 206 Mistral
Basic version, powered by 48 kW (64 hp) Rotax 582 engine.
AE 206 US
"Ultra Silent" version with larger, lower geared propeller.
AE 207 Mistral Twin
Twin engined version for advertising and surveillance work, with additional, pusher Rotax 503 engine above wing. 30 built by 1999.

== Specifications (AE 206) ==
Data from Jane's All The World's Aircraft 1993-94

General characteristics

- Crew: 1
- Capacity: 1 passenger
- Length: 5.66 m (18 ft 7 in)
- Wingspan: 9.40 m (30 ft 10 in)
- Height: 2.25 m (7 ft 5 in)
- Wing area: 16.39 m^{2} (176.4 sq ft)
- Airfoil: NACA 23012
- Empty weight: 205 kg (452 lb)
- Max takeoff weight: 390 kg (860 lb)
- Fuel capacity: 60 L (16 US gal; 13 imp gal)
- Powerplant: 1 × Rotax 582 two-stroke, two-cylinder water-cooled piston engine, 48 kW (64 hp)

Performance

- Maximum speed: 155 km/h (96 mph, 84 kn)
- Cruise speed: 90 km/h (56 mph, 49 kn) (econ. cruise)
- Never exceed speed: 165 km/h (103 mph, 89 kn)
- Range: 530 km (330 mi, 290 nmi)
- Service ceiling: 4,575 m (15,010 ft) (at least)
- Rate of climb: 3.9 m/s (760 ft/min)
- Takeoff distance to 15 m (50 ft): 200 m (656 ft)
- Landing distance from 15 m (50 ft): 225 m (738 ft)
