= ACLA =

Acla was a Spanish colonial town of the early 16th century.

ACLA may refer to:

- Anti-cardiolipin antibodies
- Allegheny County Library Association, a library association in Western Pennsylvania
- American Coalition of Life Activists, an anti-abortion activist group
- All China Lawyers Association, the bar association of the People's Republic of China
- Aero Consult Light Aircraft, an aircraft manufacturer in the Netherlands
