= Battle of Lepanto order of battle =

List of warships in 1571 battle

This is the order of battle during the Battle of Lepanto on 7 October 1571 in which the Holy League deployed 6 galleasses and 206 galleys, while the Ottoman forces numbered 216 galleys and 56 galliots.

== Fleet of the Holy League¹ ==
The combined Christian fleet was placed under the command of John of Austria (Don Juan de Austria) with Marcantonio Colonna as his principal deputy.

=== Left Wing ===
Commanded by Agostino Barbarigo (53 galleys, 2 galleasses)

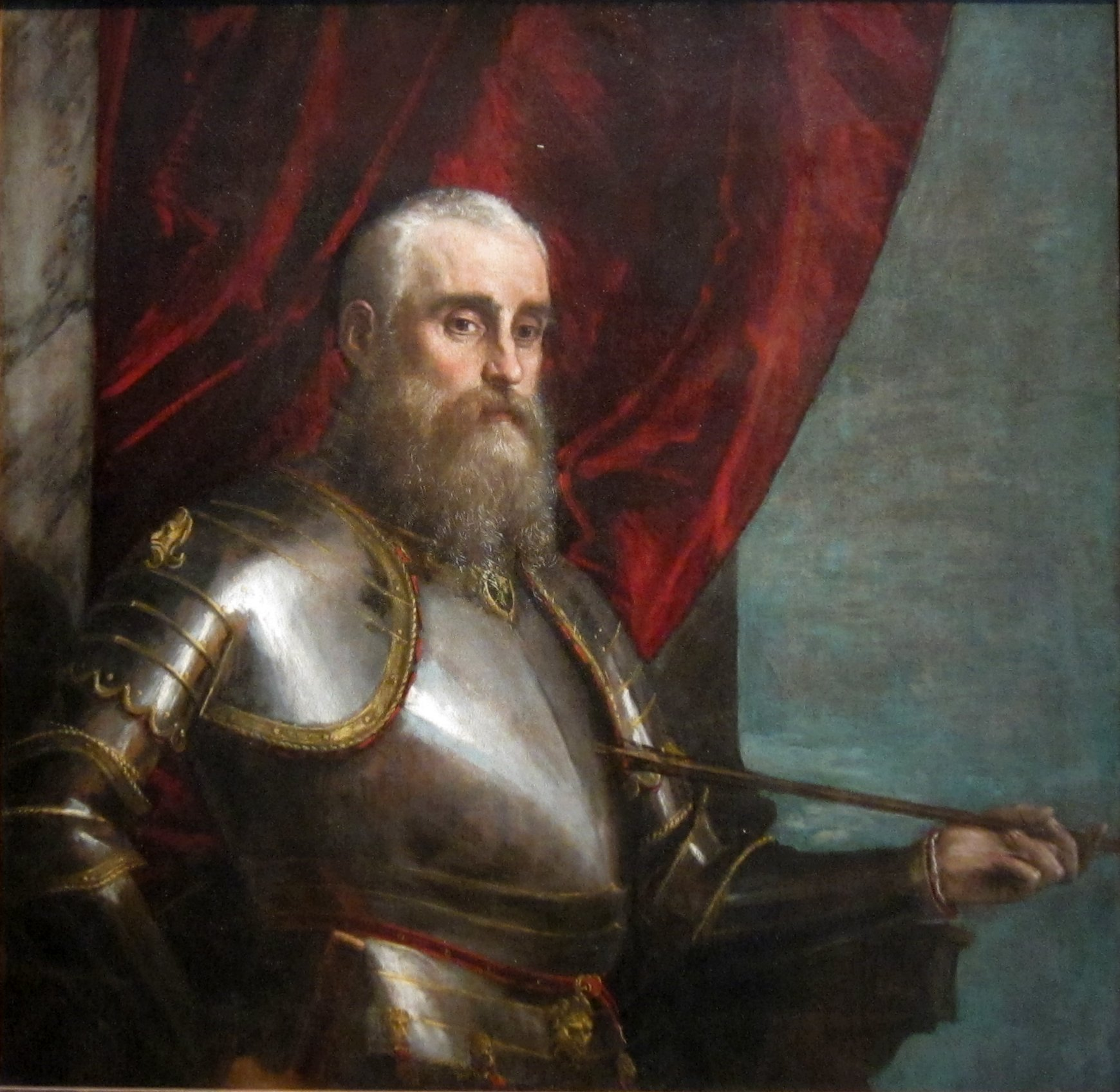
Agostino Barbarigo

- Venetian Galleasses (2)
  - Galleass of Ambrogio Bragadin
  - Galleass of Antonio Bragadin
- Venetian Galleys (39)
  - Capitana Lanterna (flagship lantern) of Venice (L) – Agostino Barbarigo †, provveditore generale
  - Capitana (flagship) of Venice (L) – Marco Querini, provveditore of the Fleet
  - Fortuna (Fortune) of Venice – Andrea Barbarigo †
  - Tre Mani (Three Hands) of Venice – Giorgio Barbarigo
  - Due Delfini (Two Dolphins) of Candia – Francesco Zen
  - Leone e Fenice (Lion & Phoenix) of Candia – Francesco Mengano
  - Madonna (Milady) of Candia – Filippo Polani
  - Cavallo Marino (Seahorse) of Candia – Antonio De Cavalli
  - Due Leoni (Two Lions) of Candia – Nicolò Fradello
  - Leone (Lion) of Candia – Francesco Bonvecchio
  - Cristo (Christ) of Candia I – Andrea Corner
  - Angelo (Angel) of Candia – Giovanni Angelo
  - Piramide (Pyramid) of Candia – Francesco Bono †
  - Cristo Risorto (Risen Christ) of Venice I – Simon Guoro
  - Cristo Risorto (Risen Christ) of Venice II – Federico Renier
  - Cristo (Christ) of Corfu – Cristoforo Condocolli
  - Cristo Risorto (Risen Christ) of Candia I – Francesco Zancaruol
  - Cristo (Christ) of Venice I – Bartolomeo Donato
  - Cristo (Christ) of Candia II – Giovanni Corner
  - Christo Risordo (Risen Christ) of Candia II
  - Rodi (Rhodes) of Candia – Francesco Molini (Konstam gives Kodus)
  - Sant'Eufemia (St. Euphemia) of Brescia – Orazio Fisogni
  - Bravo (Skillful) of Candia – Michele Viramano (Konstam gives Blessed)
  - Cavallo Marino (Seahorse) of Venice
  - Cristo (Christ) of Candia III – Danielo Calefatti
  - Braccio (Arm) of Venice – Nicolò Lippomano (Konstam gives "of Candia")
  - Nostra Signora (Our Lady) of Zante – Nicolò Mondini
  - Christo Risordo (Risen Christ) of Candia III – Giorgio Calergi
  - Nostra Signora (Our Lady) of Venice I – Marcantonio Pisani
  - Dio Padre e Santa Trinità (God, Father & Holy Trinity) of Venice – Giovanni Marino Contarini †
  - Cristo Risorto (Risen Christ) of Venice III – Giovanni Battista Querini
  - Angelo (Angel) of Venice – Onfre Giustiniani
  - Santa Dorotea (St. Dorothy) of Venice – Polo Nani
  - Ketianana of Retimo – Nicolò Avonal
  - Lion's Head of Istria
  - Croce (Cross) of Cefalonia – Marco Cimera
  - Vergine Santa (Virgin Saint) of Cefalonia – Cristoforo Criffa
  - Cristo Risorto (Risen Christ) of Veglia – Lodovico Cicuta (Konstam gives "of Vegia")
  - San Nicolò (St. Nicholas) of Cherso – Colane Drascio
  - Some sources include:
    - Dama a cavallo (Lady on Horseback) of Candia – Antonio Eudomeniani
    - Leone (Lion) of Capodistria – Domenico Del Taco
- Spanish Galleys (12)
  - Lomellina of Naples – Agostino Cancuale (Konstam gives "of Spain")
  - Fiamma (Flame) of Naples – Juan de las Cuevas
  - San Giovanni (St. John) of Naples – Garcia de Vergara
  - Invidia (Envy) of Naples – Teribio de Accaves
  - Brava (Skillful) of Naples – Miguel Quesada (Konstam gives Blessed)
  - San Jacopo (St. James) of Naples – Moferat Guardiola
  - San Nicola (St. Nicholas) of Naples – Cristobal de Mongiu (Konstam gives San Nicolò)
  - Vittoria (Victory) of Naples – Occava of Rocadi
  - Fortuna (Fortune) of Gio Andrea Doria – Giovanni Alvigi Belvi (Konstam gives "of St. Andrew")
  - 3 other unnamed galleys, given by some sources as:
    - Sagittaria (Archer) of Naples – Martino Pirola
    - Idra (Hydra) of Naples – Luigi Pasqualigo
    - Santa Lucia (St. Lucy) of Naples – Francesco Bono
- Papal Galley (1)
  - Regina (Queen) – Fabio Valicati (Konstam gives Reign)
- Genoese Galley (1)
  - Marchesa (Marquise) of Gio Andrea Doria – Francesco San Fedra (Konstam gives Marchessa)

=== Center Division ===
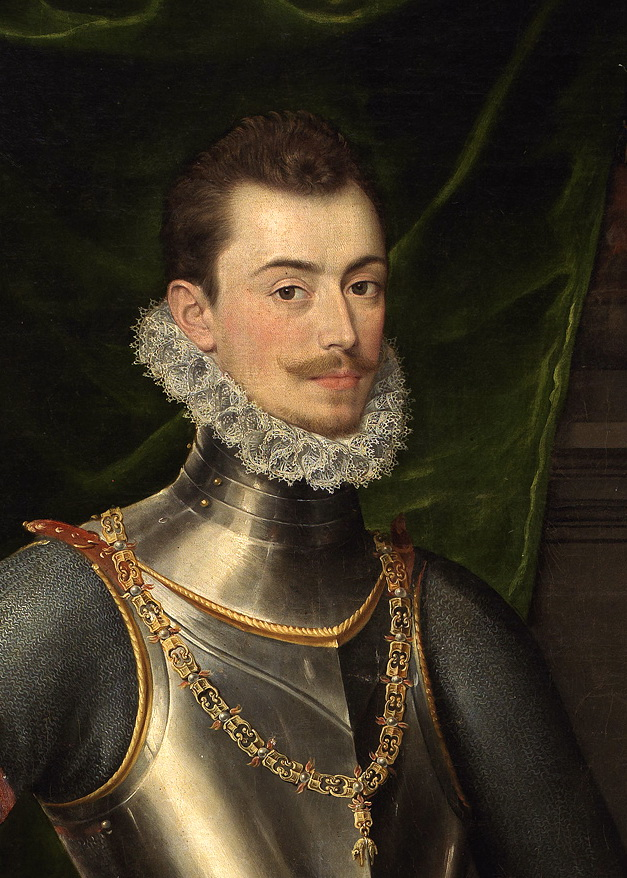
John of Austria

Commanded by Don John of Austria (62 galleys, 2 galleasses)

- Venetian Galleasses (2)
  - Galleass of Francesco Duodo (overall commander of the 6 Venetian Galleasses)
  - Galleass of Jacopo Guoro
- Spanish Galleys (15)
  - Real (royal flagship) – Don John of Austria, admiral of the navy
  - Capitana (flagship) of Castille – Luis de Requesens
  - Capitana (flagship) of Savoy – Andrea Provana of Leinì (Konstam gives Prince of Urbino, admiral of Savoy)
  - Patrona Real (royal squadron flagship) (Spain) – Juan Bautista Cortés or Luis de Requesens
  - Capitana (flagship) of Bandinelli (Naples) – Bandinelli Sauli (Konstam gives Bandinella & Bendinelli)
  - Capitana (flagship) of Grimaldi (Naples) – Giorgio Grimaldi
  - Padrona (squadron flagship) of Spain – Francesc de Benavides (Konstam gives Bonavides)
  - Roccaful of Spain – Roccaful (Konstam gives Fortress)
  - San Francisco (St. Francis) of Spain
  - Granada of Spain – Paolo Bottino (Konstam gives Granata)
  - Figiera of Spain – Diego Lopez de Ilianos
  - Luna (Moon) of Spain – Manuel de Aguilar
  - Fortuna (Fortune) of Naples – Diego de Medrano
  - Mendoza of Naples – Álvaro de Bazán (Konstam gives Mendozza)
  - San Giorgio (St. George) of Naples – Eugenio de Vargas
  - Another unnamed galley, given by some sources as:
    - Piramide con cane (Pyramid & Dog) of Spain (?) – Marcantonio Uliana

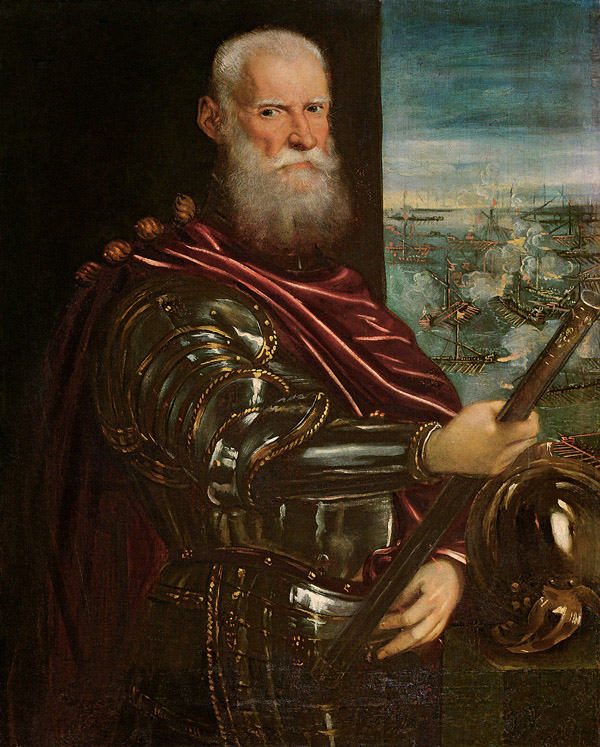
Sebastiano Venier

- Venetian Galleys (29)
  - Capitana (flagship) of Venice (L) – Sebastiano Venier, Captain-General of the Sea
  - Capitana (flagship) of Lomellini – Paolo Orsini
  - Padrona (squadron flagship) of Lomellini – Pier Battista Lomellini
  - Capitana (flagship) of Mari – Giorgio d'Asti
  - San Giovanni (St. John) of Venice I – Pietro Badoaro
  - Tronco (Trunk) of Venice – Girolamo Canale
  - Mongibello (Mt. Gibel) of Venice – Bertucci Contarini
  - Vergine (Virgin) of Candia
  - Nostra Signora (Our Lady) of Venice II – Giovanni Zeni
  - Cristo (Christ) of Venice II – Girolamo Contarini
  - Ruota con Serpente (Wheel & Serpent) – Gabrio da Canale
  - Piramide (Pyramid) of Venice
  - Palma (Palm) of Venice – Girolamo Venier †
  - San Teodoro (St. Theodore) of Venice – Teodoro Balbi
  - Montagna (Mountain) of Candia – Alessandro Vizzamano
  - San Giovanni Battista (St. John the Baptist) of Venice – Giovanni Mocenigo
  - Cristo (Christ) of Venice III – Giorgio Pisani
  - San Giovanni (St. John) of Venice II – Daniele Moro
  - Passaro (Sparrow) of Venice – Nicolò Tiepolo
  - Leone (Lion) of Venice – Pietro Pisani
  - San Girolamo (St. Jerome) of Venice – Gasparo Malipiero
  - Giuditta (Judith) of Zante – Marino Sicuro
  - San Cristoforo (St. Christopher) of Venice – Alessandro Contarini
  - Armellino (Ermine) of Candia – Marco Quirini (Konstam gives Armelino)
  - Mezza Luna (Half Moon) of Venice – Valerio Valleresso
  - Uomo di Mare (Man of the Sea) of Vicenza – Jacopo Draffano
  - Sant'Alessandro (St. Alexander) of Bergamo – Giovanni Antonio Colleoni
  - San Girolamo (St. Jerome) of Hvar – Giovanni Balsi
  - Another unnamed Venetian galley
- Genoese Galleys (8)
  - Capitana (flagship) of Genoa (L) – Ettore Spinola †
  - Capitana (flagship) of Gil d'Andrada (L) – Bernardo Cinoguera
  - Padrona (squadron flagship) of Genoa (L) – Pellerano
  - Padrona Imperiale (squadron flagship) of Davide Imperiali (Sicily) – Nicolò da Luvano
  - Perla (Pearl) of Gio Andrea Doria – Giovanni Battista Spinola
  - Temperanza (Temperance) of Gio Andrea Doria – Cipriano De Mari
  - Vittoria (Victory) of Gio Andrea Doria – Filippo Doria
  - Doria of Gio Andrea Doria – Jacopo of Casale (Konstam gives Piramide, Pyramid)
- Papal Galleys (6) (including Tuscan contingent)
  - Capitana (flagship) of His Holiness – Marcantonio Colonna, flagship of the papal contingent
  - Toscana (Tuscany) of Tuscany – Metello Caracciolo
  - Pisana (Pisa) of Tuscany – Ercole Lotta
  - Firenze (Florence) of Tuscany – Tommaso De' Medici
  - Pace (Peace) of His Holiness – Jacopo Antonio Perpignano
  - Vittoria (Victoria) of His Holiness – Baccio of Pisa
  - Some sources also include
    - Grifona (Gryphon) of His Holiness – Alessandro Negrone
- Galleys of the Knights of Malta (3)
  - Capitana (flagship) of Malta – Pietro Giustiniani, prior of Messina; flagship of the Maltese contingent (Konstam gives "Justin, the Prior of Messina")
  - San Pietro (St. Peter) – Roquelare St.-Aubin (Konstam gives The Order of St. Peter)
  - San Giovanni (St. John) – Alonso de Texada (Konstam gives The Order of St. John)

=== Right Wing ===
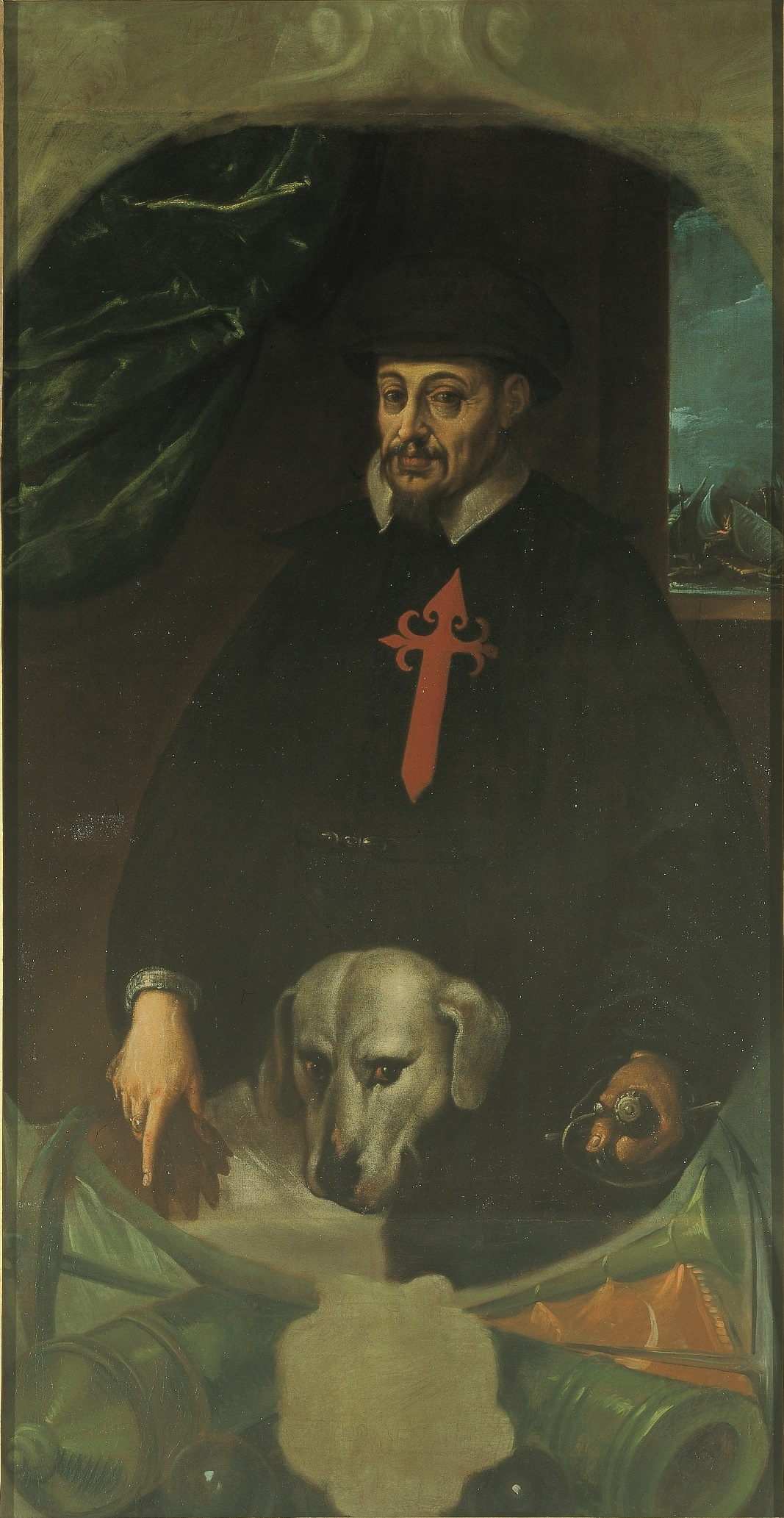
Giovanni Andrea Doria

Commanded by Giovanni Andrea Doria (53 galleys, 2 galleasses)

- Venetian Galleasses (2)
  - Galleass of Andrea da Cesare
  - Galleass of Pietro Pisani
- Genoese Galleys (16)
  - Capitana (flagship) of Giovanni Andrea Doria – Giovanni Andrea Doria
  - Capitana (flagship) of Negroni – Gio Ambrogio Negroni
  - Padrona (squadron flagship) of Grimaldi – Lorenzo Treccia
  - Padrona (squadron flagship) of Nicolò Doria – Giulio Centurione (Konstam gives "of Andrea Doria")
  - Padrona (squadron flagship) of Negroni – Luigi Gamba
  - Padrona (squadron flagship) of Lomellini – Giorgio Greco
  - Swordsman of Rethymno/Retimo
  - San Vittorio (St. Victor) of Crema
  - Furia (Fury) of Lomellini – Jacopo Chiappe
  - Negrona (Negress) of Negroni – Nicolo da Costa
  - Bastarda (Bastard) of Negroni – Lorenzo da Torre
  - San Tritone of Cataro
  - Monarca (Monarch) of Gio Andrea Doria – Nicolò Garibaldo
  - Donzella (Maid) of Gio Andrea Doria – Nicolò Imperiale
  - Diana of Genoa – Giovanni Giorgio Lasagna
  - Another unnamed Genoese galley, given by some sources as
    - Urania of Genoa
  - Other sources include
    - Capitana (flagship) of Nicolò Doria – Pandolfo Polidoro
    - Padrona (squadron flagship) of Mari – Antonio Corniglia
- Spanish Galleys (10)
  - Sicilia (Sicily) – Francesco Amodei
  - Piemontese (Savoyard) – Ottavio Moretto †
  - Margherita (Margaret) – Battaglino
  - Cingana – Gabriel de Medina
  - Luna (Moon) – Julio Rubio
  - Speranza (Hope) – Pedro de Busto
  - Gusmana – Francesco de Osedo
  - 3 other unnamed galleys, given by some sources as
    - Fortuna (Fortuna) – Diego de Medrano
    - Determinada (Determined) – Juan de Angustina Carasa
    - Turca (Turk) – Simone Goto
- Venetian Galleys (25)
  - Padrona (squadron flagship) of Mari (Parini) – Antonio Corriglia
  - Forza (Force) of Venice – Rinieri Zeni
  - Regina (Queen) of Candia – Giovanni Barbarigo (Konstam gives Rema)
  - Nino (Boy) of Venice – Paulo Polani
  - Cristo Risorto (Risen Christ) of Venice IV – Benedetto Soranzo
  - Palma (Palm) of Candia – Jacopo di Mezzo †
  - Angelo (Angel) of Corfu – Stelio Carchiopulo
  - Nave (Ship) of Venice – Antonio Pasqualigo
  - Nostra Signora (Our Lady) of Candia – Marco Foscarini
  - Cristo (Our Lady) of Candia IV – Francesco Cornero
  - Fuoco (Flame) of Candia – Antonio Boni
  - Aquila (Eagle) of Candia – Girolamo Zorzi
  - San Cristoforo (St. Christopher) of Venice – Andrea Tron
  - Cristo (Christ) of Venice IV – Marcantonio Lando †
  - Speranza (Hope) of Candia – Girolamo Cornaro †
  - San Giuseppe (St. Joseph) of Venice – Nicolò Donato
  - Torre (Tower) of Vicenza – Lodovico da Porto
  - Aquila (Eagle) of Corfu – Pietro Bua †
  - Aquila (Eagle) of Retimo – Pietro Pisano
  - San Giovanni (St. John) of Arbe – Giovanni de Dominis
  - La Donna (The Lady) of Friuli/Traù – Luigi Cippico
  - Re Attila (King Attila) of Padua – Pataro Buzzacarini (Konstam gives Reality)
  - 3 other unnamed galleys, given by some sources as
    - Uomo Armato (Armed Man) of Retimo – Andrea Calergi, signore of Candia
    - San Vittorio (St. Victor) of Crema – Evangelista Zurla
    - San Trifone (St. Tryphon) of Cattaro/Kotor – Girolamo Bisante or Bizanti
- Papal Galleys (2)
  - Santa Maria (St. Mary) of His Holiness – Pandolfo Strozzi
  - San Giovanni (St. John) of His Holiness – Angelo (or Antonio) Bifali

=== Rearguard ===
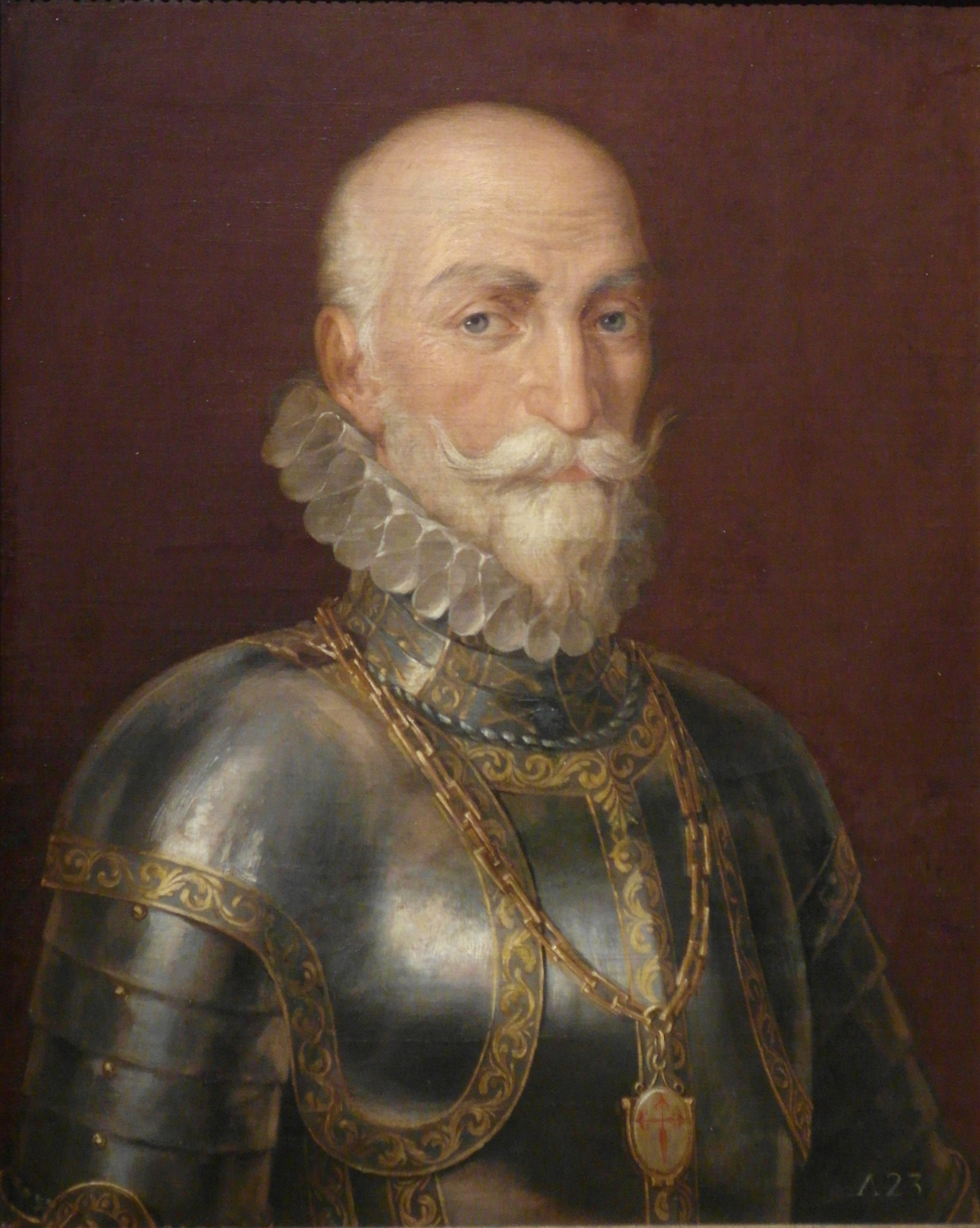
Álvaro de Bazán

Commanded by Don Álvaro de Bazán (38 galleys, including 8 galleys of the Advance Guard)

- Spanish Galleys (13)
  - Lupa (Wolf) (flagship) – Don Alvaro de Bazan, Marchese of Santa Cruz
  - Capitana (flagship) of Vasquez (Spain) – Juan Vasquez de Coronado
  - San Giovanni (St. John) of Sicily – David Imperiale
  - Gru (Crane) of Spain – Luis Heredia
  - Leona (Lioness) of Spain
  - Costanza of Naples – Pietro Delagia
  - Marchesa (Marquise) of Spain – Juan de Machado †
  - Santa Barbara (St. Barbara) of Naples – Giovanni de Ascale
  - Sant'Andrea (St. Andrew) of Naples
  - Santa Caterina (St. Catherine) of Naples – Juan Ruiz de Velasco
  - Sant'Angelo of Naples - Don Alonso de Bazán
  - Terana of Naples – Giovanni de Riva of Neillino
  - Another unnamed Spanish or Neapolitan galley, given by some sources as
    - Ocasión (Occasion) of Spain – Pere de Roig
- Venetian Galleys (12)
  - Cristo (Christ) of Venice V – Marco da Molino
  - Due Mani (Two Hands) of Venice – Giovanni Loredano †
  - Fede (Faith) of Venice – Giovanni Battista Contarini
  - Pilastro (Pillar) of Venice – Caterino Malipiero
  - Maddalena (Magdalene) of Venice – Alvigi Balbe
  - Signora (Lady) of Venice – Giovanni Bembo
  - Mondo (World) of Venice – Filippo Leoni
  - Speranza (Hope) of Cipro – Giovanni Battista Benedetti † (Konstam gives "of Venice")
  - San Pietro (St. Peter) – Marco Fiumaco
  - Sibilla (Sibyl) of Venice – Danielo Troni
  - San Giorgio (St. George) of Sebenico – Cristoforo Lucio
  - San Michele (St. Michael) – Giorgio Cochini
- Papal Galleys (3)
  - Padrona (squadron flagship) of His Holiness – Alfonso d'Appiano
  - Suprema (Supremacy) – Antonio da Ascoli
  - Serena (Serenity)
- Genoese Galleys (2)
  - Baccana – Giovanni Pietro de Morilo
  - Another unnamed Genoese galley, given by some sources as
    - San Bartolomeo (St. Bartholomew)

=== Vanguard ===
Commanded by Juan de Cardona y Requesens (8 galleys attached to the Reserve force)

  - Capitana (flagship) of Sicilia – Joan Antoni de Cardona
  - Padrona (squadron flagship) of Sicily
  - San Giovanni (St. John) of Sicily – Davide Imperiale
  - San Ionica of Sicily
  - Santa Maddalena (St. Magdalene) of Venice – Marino Contarini
  - Sole (Sun) of Venice – Vincenzo Quirini †
  - Santa Caterina (St. Catherine) of Venice – Marco Cicogna
  - Nostra Donna (Our Lady) of Venice – Pier Francesco Malipiero (Konstam gives "Our Woman")

== Ottoman Fleet² ==
Supreme command of the Ottoman Fleet was held by Müezzinzade Ali Pasha

=== Left Wing ===
Commanded by Uluç Ali Reis (61 galleys, 32 galliots)

- Turkish (Constantinople) Galleys (14)
  - Nasur Ferhad
  - Kasam Reis
  - Osman Reis
  - Kiafi Hajji
  - Ferhad Ali
  - Memi Bey
  - Piri Osman
  - Piri Reis
  - Selim Basti
  - Talatagi Reis
  - Celebi Reis
  - Tartar Ali
  - Kafir Hajji
  - Karaman Pasha
- Barbary (Algerian) Galleys (14)
  - Uluç Ali Reis – Wing commander
  - Karl Ali
  - Karaman Ali
  - Alemdar Pasha
  - Sinian Celebi
  - Amdjazade Mustafa
  - Dragud Ali
  - Seydi Ali
  - Peri Selim
  - Murad Darius
  - Uluj Reis
  - Macasir Ali
  - Ionas Osman
  - Salim Deli
- Syrian Galleys (6)
  - Kara Bey
  - Dermat Bey
  - Osman Bey
  - Iusuf Ali
  - Kari Alemdar
  - Murad Hasan
- Anatolian Galleys (13)
  - Karali Reis
  - Piriman Reis
  - Hazuli Sinian
  - Chios Mehemet
  - Hignau Mustafa
  - Cademly Mustafa
  - Uschiufly Memy
  - Kari Mora
  - Darius Pasha
  - Piali Osman
  - Tursun Osman
  - Iosul Piali
  - Keduk Seydi
- Greek (Negropont) Galleys (14)
  - Seydi Reis
  - Arnaud Ali
  - Chendereli Mustafa
  - Mustafa Hajji
  - Sali Reis
  - Hamid Ali
  - Karaman Hyder
  - Magyar Fehrad
  - Nasur Ferhad
  - Nasi Reis
  - Kara Rhodi
  - Kos Hajji
  - Kos Mend
  - Karam Bey (Albanian)
- Turkish (Constantinople) Galliots (19)
  - Uluj Piri Pasha
  - Karaman Suleiman
  - Haneshi Ahmed
  - Hyder Enver
  - Nur Memi
  - Karaman Reis
  - Kaleman Memi
  - Guzman Ferhad
  - Hunyadis Hasan
  - Kemal Murad
  - Sarmusal Reis
  - Tursun Suleiman
  - Celebi Iusuf
  - Hascedi Hassan
  - Sian Memi
  - Osman Dagli
  - Karaman Reis
  - 2 unnamed Turkish galiots
- Albanian Galiots (8)
  - Deli Murad
  - Alemdar Reis
  - Sian Siander
  - Alemrdar Ali
  - Hasan Omar
  - Seydi Aga
  - Hasan Sinam
  - Jami Fazil
- Anatolian Galiots (5)
  - Kara Alemdhar
  - Suzi Memi
  - Nabi Reis
  - Hasan Osman
  - Hunyadi Iusuf

=== Centre Division ===
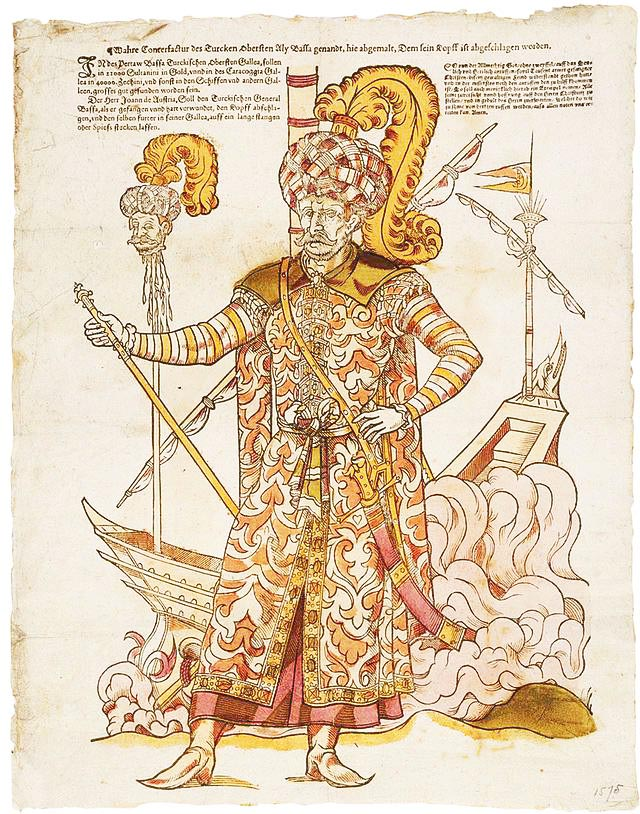
Müezzinzade Ali Pasha

Commanded by Müezzinzade Ali Pasha (87 galleys divided into the First Line (among which are the fittest and newest galleys of the fleet) and the Second Line)

First Line

- Turkish (Constantinople) Galleys (22)
  - Müezzinzade Ali Pasha, Sultana – Fleet flagship
  - Osman Reis – Wing commander
  - Portasi Pasha – Commander, embarked troops
  - Hasan Pasha (son of Barbarossa)
  - Hasan Reis
  - Kos Ali
  - Kilik Reais
  - Uluj Reis
  - Piri Uluj Bey
  - Dardagan Reis – Governor of the Arsenal
  - Deli Osman
  - Piri Osman
  - Demir Celebi
  - Darius Haseki
  - Sinian Mustafa
  - Heseki Reis
  - Hasan Uluj
  - Kosem Iusuf
  - Aga Ahmed
  - Osman Seydi
  - Darius Celebi
  - Kafar Reis
- Rhodes Galleys (12)
  - Hasan Rey – Governor of Rhodes (L)
  - Deli Chender – Warden of Rhodes (L)
  - Osa Reis
  - Postana Uluj
  - Khalifa Uluj
  - Ghazni Reis
  - Dromus Reis
  - Berber Kali
  - Karagi Reis
  - Occan Reis
  - Deli Ali
  - Hajji Aga
- Black Sea (Bulgarian and Bithynian) Galleys (13)
  - Prauil Aga
  - Kara Reis
  - Arnaud Reis
  - Jami Uluj
  - Arnaud Celebi
  - Magyar Ali
  - Kali Celebi
  - Deli Celebi
  - Deli Assan
  - Kamen Aga
  - Sinian Reis
  - Kari Mustafa
  - Seydi Arnaud
- Gallipoli Galleys (4)
  - Piri Hamagi
  - Ali Reis
  - Iusuf Ali
  - Sinian Bektashi
- Greek (Negropont) Galleys (11)
  - Osman Reis
  - Mehmed Bey – Governor of Metelina
  - Baktashi Uluj
  - Baktashi Mustafa
  - Sinian Ali
  - Agdagi Reis
  - Deli Iusuf
  - Orphan Ali
  - Cali Celebi
  - Bagdar Reis
  - Hanyadi Mustafa

Second Line

- Constantinople Galleys (12)
  - Tramontana Reis
  - Murad Reis
  - Suleiman Celebi
  - Deli Ibrahim
  - Murad Korosi
  - Darnad Ali
  - Kari Reis
  - Darius Sinian
  - Dardagi Ali
  - Hyder Carai
  - Darius Ali
  - Kan Ali
- Barbary (Tripoli) Galleys (6)
  - Hyder Aga
  - Kari Hamat
  - Husam Kahlim Ali
  - Deram Uluj
  - Deydi Ali
  - Mohammed Ali
- Gallipoli Galleys (7)
  - Aziz Khalifa – Governor of Gallipoli
  - Selim Sahi
  - Seydi Pasha
  - Hasan Mustafa
  - Hasseri Ali
  - Hassan Deli
  - Iusuf Seydi

=== Right Wing ===
Commanded by Mehmed Siroco (60 galleys and 2 galiots)

- Turkish (Constantinople) Galleys (20)
  - Suleiman Bey
  - Kara Mustafa
  - Ibrahim Reis
  - Suleiman Reis
  - Karaman Ibrahim
  - Chender Sinian
  - Hasan Nabi
  - Ali 'Genoese'
  - Hali Reis
  - Seydi Selim
  - Kumar Iusuf
  - Bardas Celebi
  - Bardas Hasan
  - Fazil Ali Bey
  - Drusari Piri
  - Koda Ali
  - Sinaman Mustafa
  - Caracoza Ali
  - Mustafa Alendi
  - Marmara Reis
- Babary (Tripoli) Galleys (5)
  - Arga Pasha
  - Arnaut Ferhad
  - Darnad Iusuf
  - Suleiman Reis
  - Fazil Memi
- Anatolian Galleys (13)
  - Mehemet Bey
  - Maysor Ali
  - Amurat Reis
  - Kalifi Memi
  - Murad Mustafa
  - Hyder Mehmet
  - Sinian Darius
  - Mehmet Darius
  - Amdjazade Simian
  - Adagi Hasan
  - Sinjji Musafa
  - Hajji Cebebi
  - Tursan Mustafa
- Egyptian (Alexandrian) Galleys (22)
  - Mehmed Siroco (wing commander)
  - Kari Ali
  - Herus Reis
  - Karas Turbat
  - Bagli Serif
  - Hasan Celebi
  - Osman Celebi
  - Dink Kasai
  - Osman Occan
  - Darius Aga
  - Drazed Sinian
  - Osman Ali
  - Deli Aga
  - Dardagut Bardabey
  - Kasli Khan
  - Iusuf Aga
  - Iusuf Magyar
  - Khalifa Hyder
  - Mustafa Kemal
  - Dernadi Piri
  - Memi Hasan
  - Kari Ali
- Egyptian (Alexandrian) Galiots (2)
  - Abdul Reis
  - Piali Murad

=== Rearguard ===
Commanded by Amuret Dragut Rais (8 galleys and 22 galiots)

- Greek (Negropont) Galleys (4)
  - Amuret Dragut Reis
  - Kaidar Memi
  - Deli Dori
  - Hasan Sinian
- Anatolian Galleys (4)
  - Deli Suleiman
  - Deli Bey
  - Kiafar Bey
  - Kasim Sinian
- Mixed Squadron of Galiots (22)
  - Ali Uluj
  - Kara Deli
  - Ferhad Kara Ali
  - Dardagud Reis
  - Kasim Kara
  - Hasan Reis
  - Alemdar Hasan
  - Kos Ali
  - Hajji Ali
  - Kurtprulu Celebi
  - Setagi Meni
  - Setagi Osman
  - Hyder Ali
  - Hyder Deli
  - Armad Memi
  - Hasan Reis
  - Jami Naser
  - Nur Ali
  - Kari Ali
  - Murad Ali
  - Iumaz Ali
  - Haneschi Murad

== Notes on ship nomenclature ==
1. Several vessels among the fleet of the Holy League bore the same name. Whilst this is not unheard of among ships belonging to different nationalities, some of the said ships belong to the same nation. These did not seem to be of great importance to Christian commanders at that time. In order to avoid confusion, those vessels bearing the same name were suffixed with ordinal number according to nationality (i.e. Christ of Candia I, Christ of Candia II; Christ of Venice I, Christ of Venice II, etc.).

2. In contrast to their Western contemporaries, Turkish records only show the names of commanders of the ships instead of the names of the ship themselves.

3. In Italian use, various flagships were called by the rank of their commander. A reale ("royal") was personally commanded by a king or his agent; a capitana ("captainess") by a captain general; a padrona ("master") by a padrone.
