= Aviasud Engineering =

Aircraft manufacturer in France

Aviasud Engineering was a French aviation company that specialized in composite lightweight aircraft.

From 1980, it produced:

- The Mistral was chosen by Nicolas Hulot for his first ULM flight at the North Pole, with Hubert de Chevigny. The 1983 Aviasud Sirocco (Cruise speed: 80 km/h, Empty weight: 131 kg); single-seat parasol monoplane.
- The 1985 Aviasud Mistral AE 206 (Cruise speed: 72 kt | 83 mph | 133 km/h, Empty weight: 215 kg | 474 lb); biplane (also a twin version).
- The Mistral was chosen by Nicolas Hulot for his first ULM flight at the North Pole, with Hubert de Chevigny.
- In the meantime, Aviasud has distinguished itself in competitions. The Sirocco won the world championship in its category in 1985, and the Mistral in 1990; many international records have been broken by these two devices.
- The 1991 Aviasud Albatros AE 209 (Cruise speed: 67 kt | 78 mph | 125 km/h, Empty weight: 230 kg | 507 lb); two-seat ultralight. Three versions with different engines. In 1991, the first flight of the Albatros was made, the wings of which can be folded in one minute. It went into production in September 1992. Its success is greater than the two previous Aviasud microlights. Shortly after, Aviasud took a 24% stake in the Indian company Raj Hamsa Ultralights (PVT) Ltd.
- The first is the XPair, introduced on the market from 1994. The second is between the XPAIR and the Aviasud range, and was to be put on the market in 1995. The aim was to cover a large part of the demand.
- A joint venture agreement is concluded to have two ranges of low-cost microlights manufactured in India.

Address (1986): Aviasud Engineering, z.i.la palud-83600, Frejus, France; tel: 94 53 94 00, tx 461172 F aviasud.

In 1994, Aviasud employed 29 employees, including 19 in manufacturing and 10 in management, marketing, management, etc. 65% of production was exported to 27 countries. Following financial difficulties, the Aviasud company had to cease its activity in 2008.
