= Aériane =

Belgian engineering company

Aériane is a Belgian engineering firm based in Gembloux that manufactures aircraft and other structures from composite materials. Currently concentrating on the Aériane Swift, they also built and supported the Aviasud Sirocco before this was taken over by Aero Consult Light Aircraft. The company also supports the Aviasud Mistral.
