= Scirocco (disambiguation) =

Scirocco is an alternate spelling of Sirocco, a significant Mediterranean wind.

Scirocco may also refer to:

== Arts and entertainment ==
- Scirocco (film), a 1987 French-Italian film directed by Aldo Lado
- Paptimus Scirocco, a character from the anime series Mobile Suit Zeta Gundam
- Scirocco, a character in the Silverwing series of books
- "Scirocco," a song by Italian singer-songwriter Francesco Guccini on his album Signora Bovary
- Scirocco, a vessel of the Martian Congressional Republic Navy in The Expanse TV series

== Cars ==
- Volkswagen Scirocco, a sport compact car
- Scirocco, a 1970 Chevrolet concept car

== Ships ==
- Italian destroyer Scirocco, launched in 1934 and sunk in 1942
- Italian frigate Scirocco, launched in 1982

== See also ==
- Scirocco-Powell, a former racing car constructor
- Sirocco (disambiguation)
