= AC Sirocco nG =

Dutch ultralight aircraft

Sirocco nG

General information
- Type: Ultralight aircraft
- National origin: Netherlands
- Manufacturer: AC Light Aircraft
- Status: In production (2015)

History
- Manufactured: 2009-present
- Introduction date: 2009
- First flight: May 2009
- Developed from: Aviasud Sirocco

The AC Sirocco nG is a Dutch ultralight aircraft based upon the 1983 Aviasud Sirocco and produced by AC Light Aircraft of Voorschoten. The aircraft is supplied as a kit for amateur construction or as a complete ready-to-fly-aircraft.

== Design and development ==
The Sirocco nG features a V-strut-braced high-wing, a single-seat open cockpit, fixed tricycle landing gear and a single engine in pusher configuration.

The aircraft is made from composites. The nG model, which first flew in May 2009, has an all-new composite wing of shorter span, 9 m (29.5 ft) and an area of 12.15 m^{2} (130.8 sq ft), with ailerons that replace the earlier spoilers. The fuselage is all composite. The standard engine used is the 33 hp (25 kW) B&S V-2 four-stroke powerplant. Electric power has also been an option since 2012/13.

The design rights to the Sirocco series are currently held by Evert Cornet of AC Light Aircraft.

== Operational history ==
The original Sirocco was the first ultralight aircraft flown around the world, completing the flight in the 1980s.

Reviewer Marino Boric wrote about the nG design in a 2015 review, saying, "the cockpit offers good crash safety. Very low stall speed, short take-off and landing and efficient controls all contribute to the Sirocco's appeal."

== Specifications (Sirocco nG) ==
Data from Tacke

General characteristics

- Crew: one
- Wingspan: 9 m (29 ft 6 in)
- Wing area: 12.15 m^{2} (130.8 sq ft)
- Aspect ratio: 6.67
- Empty weight: 115 kg (254 lb)
- Gross weight: 250 kg (551 lb)
- Fuel capacity: 20 litres (4.4 imp gal; 5.3 US gal)
- Powerplant: 1 × B&S V-2 two cylinder, four stroke aircraft engine, 25 kW (33 hp)

Performance

- Maximum speed: 120 km/h (75 mph, 65 kn)
- Cruise speed: 90 km/h (56 mph, 49 kn)
- Stall speed: 55 km/h (34 mph, 30 kn)
- Rate of climb: 5 m/s (980 ft/min)
