= Aero Consult Light Aircraft =

Aircraft manufacturer in the Netherlands

Logo

Aero Consult Light Aircraft (ACLA) is an aircraft manufacturer based in the Netherlands.

In 2007, they acquired the rights to the Aviasud Sirocco from Aériane, who wished to concentrate on the Swift glider and PAS. ACLA redesigned the tailplane and wings and re-launched the aircraft as the Sirocco nG, first flown in May 2009.
