= Agostino Barbarigo (admiral) =

Italian nobleman (1516–1571)

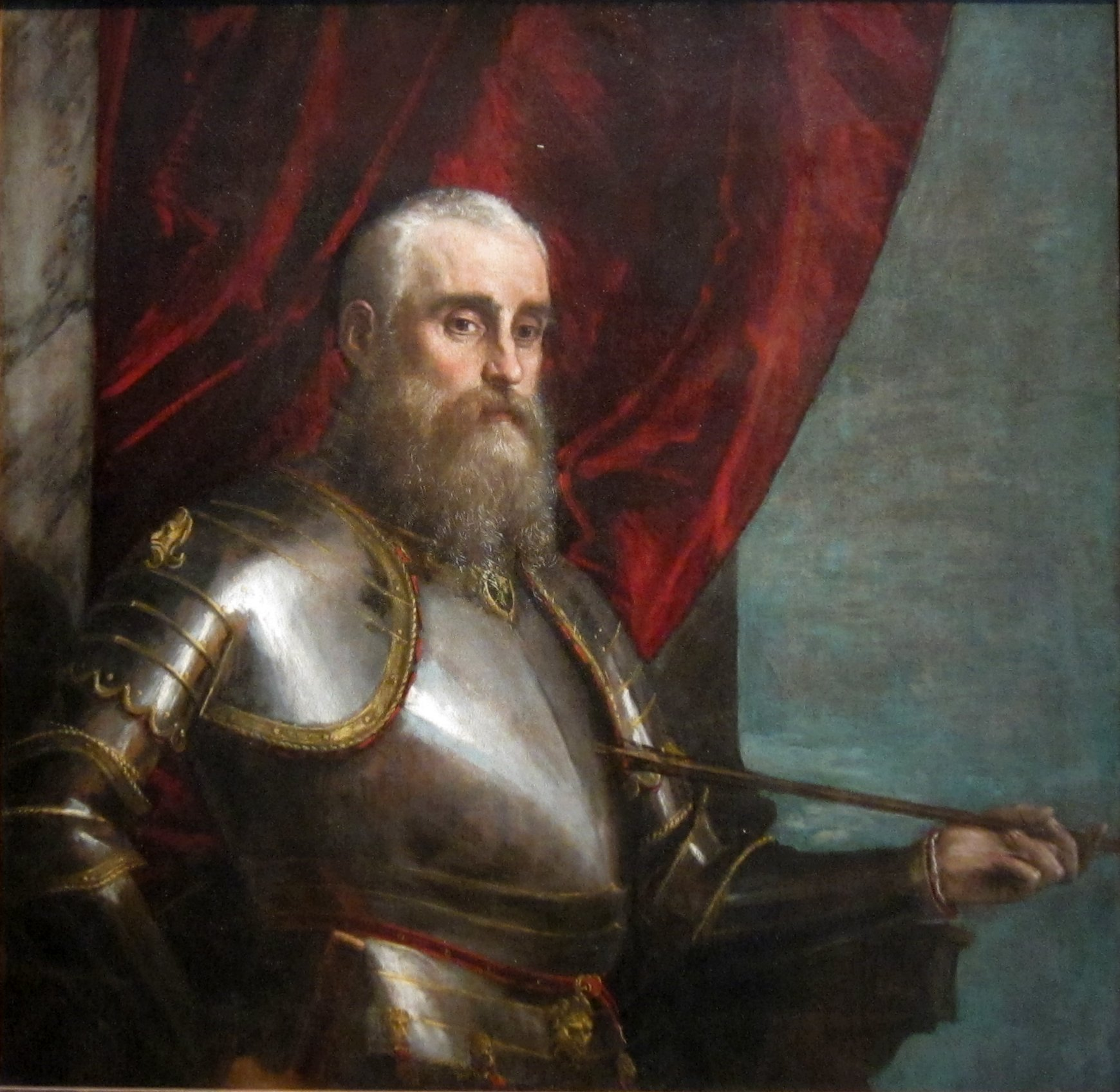
- Agostino Barbarigo in a portrait by Paolo Veronese
- Born: January 22, 1516
- Died: October 9, 1571 (aged 55); Gulf of Patras, Ionian Sea
- Military career
- Allegiance: Republic of Venice
- Rank: Admiral
- Conflicts: War of Cyprus: Battle of Lepanto †
- Other work: Venetian Ambassador in France

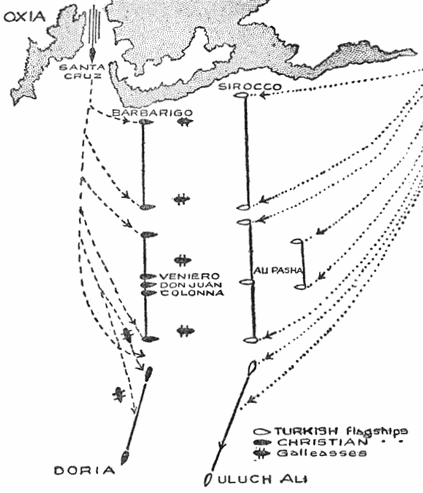
Barbarigo headed the Holy League left wing (at top left) during the 1571 Battle of Lepanto, where both he and the commander of the opposing Turkish right wing, Mehmed Siroco, were killed in action.

Agostino Barbarigo (January 22, 1516 – October 9, 1571) was a Venetian nobleman who served numerous administrative and military assignments for Venice, including Venetian Ambassador in France (1554-1557).

== Career and early life ==
Barbarigo was a Venetian noble of the Barbarigo family.

In 1567 Barbarigo was elected lieutenant of Cyprus but opted 2 months later for a different post.

=== Lepanto ===
As an experienced commander and second in command of the Venetian contingent, he led the Christian left wing, during the Battle of Lepanto. Although his galleys were victorious, he was mortally wounded by an arrow in the eye. The leader of the Turkish right wing and Barbarigo's tactical opponent, Mehmed Siroco, was also killed in the battle.

== See also ==
- Battle of Lepanto order of battle
