= Mahomet Sirocco =

Ottoman Admiral and Bey of Alexandria

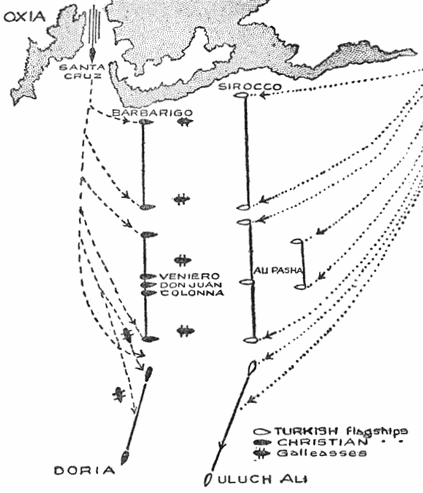
Mehmed Siroco headed the Turkish right wing (at top right) during the 1571 Battle of Lepanto, where both him and the commander of the opposing Holy League left wing, Agostino Barbarigo, were killed in action. This diagram labels him as Sirocco.

Şuluk Mehmed Pasha (1525 – 7 October 1571), better known in Europe as Mehmed Siroco or Mahomet Sirocco, and also spelled Sulik, Chulouk, Şolok, Seluk, or Suluc and known with the titles Pasha, Reis, or Bey, was the Ottoman bey (regional governor) of Alexandria in the mid-16th century. Both the foreign and the Turkish nicknames (and their various spellings) were derived from the name of the southern Mediterranean wind Sirocco, from Greek σιρόκος sirokos and the hence derived Levantine Arabic شلوق shlūq, respectively.

Mehmed Siroco was appointed admiral in command of the Turkish right at the Battle of Lepanto (1571). Fighting the Lega Santa led by Admiral Agostino Barbarigo, he was known as the most aggressive attacker of the battle. He was wounded and killed in action when he struggled against Venetians at the Battle of Lepanto, as was Barbarigo. Mehmed Siroco was beheaded by the sword of Giovanni Contarini the Venetian.

== See also ==
- Battle of Lepanto order of battle
