= Aviasud Sirocco =

Sirocco
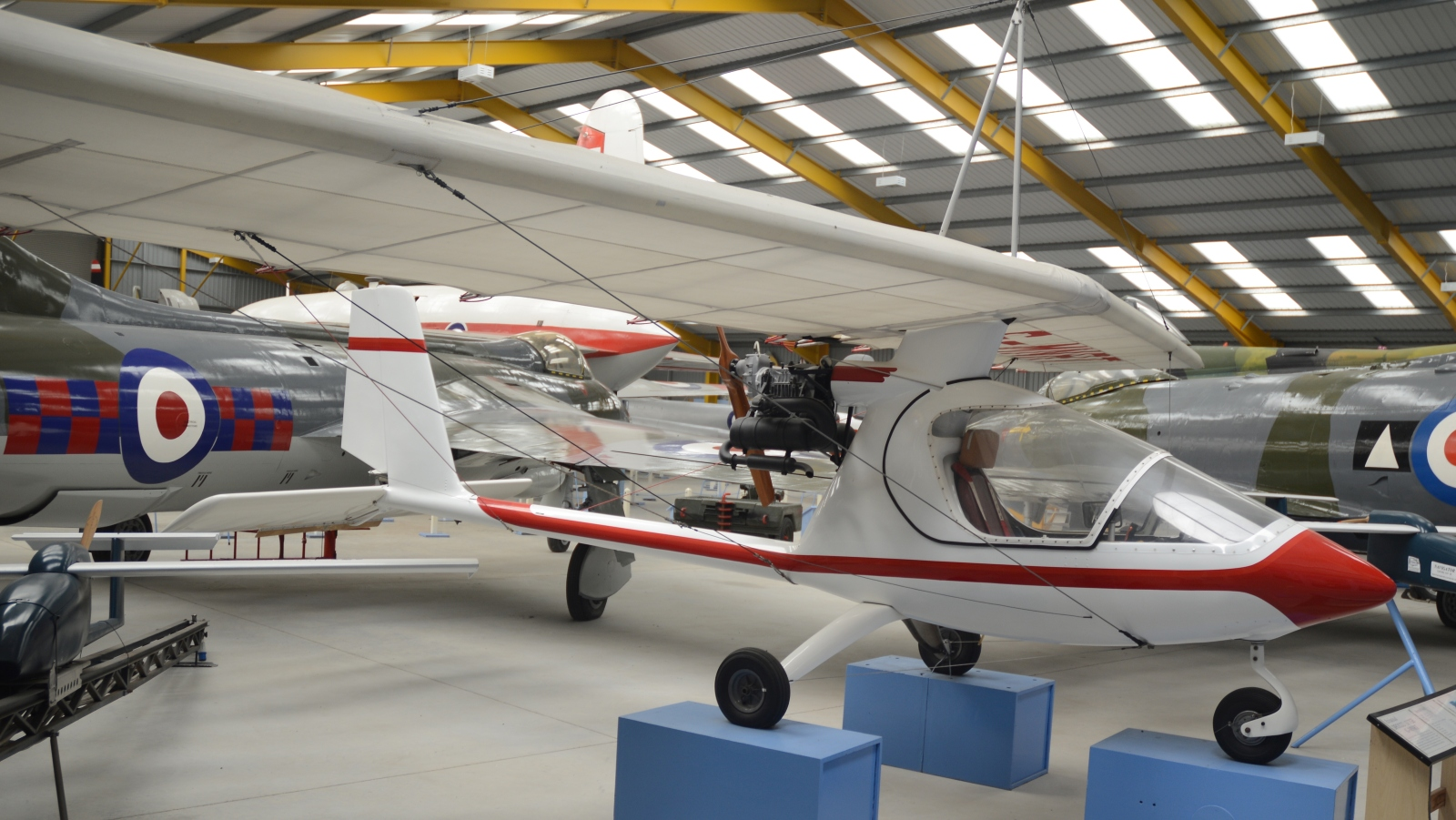

General information
- Type: single-seat ultralight aircraft
- National origin: France
- Manufacturer: Aviasud Engineering / Aériane
- Number built: more than 200

History
- Variant: AC Sirocco nG

The Aviasud Sirocco is a single-seat ultralight available in kit or fully assembled form and originally produced by Aviasud Engineering in 1983. It is of pod-and-boom design with tricycle undercarriage and pusher configuration. The fuselage is of composite construction. In 1984, one was flown by Patrice Franceschi in a circumnavigation of the earth.

In 1989, manufacture transferred to Aériane in Belgium. In 2007, the rights to the Sirocco were acquired by Aero Consult Light Aircraft, who have redesigned the tailplane and wings and who re-launched the aircraft as the AC Sirocco nG. The first flight of the nG prototype for this was in May 2009. The Sirocco NG is available as a kit, or in its lighter version (FAR 103/SSDR) fully built.

== Description ==
The aircraft has two wings which can be dismounted for transport. The leading edge box consists of a spar and fibreglass leading edge, supplemented by an alloy rear strut. The wing profile is defined by preformed aluminum ribs. The trailing edge spar is laminated fiberglass. These three elements are interconnected by compression rods, cables and ribs, and ensure the shape and tension of the fabric coating for good aerodynamic efficiency. The coating is "Bainbridge" Dacron, 170 gr/m^{2}. Once in place on the fuselage, cables and a kingpost stay the two wings.

The fuselage and vertical fin are made of a fiberglass-polyester structure consisting of 2 half shells molded and stiffened by frames and smoothed to have a lightweight structure with an aerodynamic shape. Once completed they are assembled by gluing, which ensures rigidity.

The landing gear is made from glass-epoxy. The main gear is flexible; the front axle is steerable and has a brake drum. The steering control is a lever on the right of the cockpit, with locking in a neutral position.

The two stroke-type engine may have a power ranging from 24 hp (18 kW) König SC 430RD to 40 hp (30 kW) Rotax 447, and is mounted on the rear of the central mast. Starting is manual.

The pilot is in a recumbent position in the cockpit. The canopy is removable; flights are possible without the canopy in hot weather. For the winter there is an electric heater. The pilot is kept in his seat by a 3-point belt; the seat is fixed, but the rudder pedals are adjustable (3 positions) depending on the size of the pilot. The mini control stick is central.

One-piece tailplane (fully mobile/all-flying) controlled by rigid rods and ball joints. A trim tab helps balance the machine at all speeds, to improve comfort for long flights.

== Specifications (Sirocco) ==
General characteristics

- Crew: 1
- Length: 5.08 m (16 ft 8 in)
- Wingspan: 10.06 m (33 ft 0 in)
- Height: 2.8 m (9 ft 2 in)
- Wing area: 13.1 m^{2} (141 sq ft)
- Empty weight: 131 kg (289 lb)
- Gross weight: 248 kg (547 lb)
- Powerplant: 1 × Rotax 447 2-cyl. two-stroke air-cooled in-line piston engine, 26 kW (35 hp)

Performance

- Cruise speed: 80 km/h (50 mph, 43 kn)
- Stall speed: 43 km/h (27 mph, 23 kn)
- Never exceed speed: 118 km/h (73 mph, 64 kn)
- Rate of climb: 5.08 m/s (1,000 ft/min)

== See also ==
- E-Go
