= Orsini =

Orsini is a surname of Italian origin, originally derived from Latin ursinus ("bearlike") and originating as an epithet or sobriquet describing the name-bearer's purported strength. Notable people with the surname include the following:

- Aaron Paul Orsini, American researcher on the intersection of psychelics and neurodivergence
- Alessandro Orsini, Italian sociologist
- Andrew L. Orsini, Northern Mariana Islander politician
- Angel Orsini, American wrestler and bodybuilder
- Felice Orsini (1819–1858), Italian revolutionary who attempted to assassinate Napoléon III
- Francesca Orsini, Italian scholar of South Asian literature
- Giambattista Orsini (d. 1503), Italian Catholic cardinal
- Marina Orsini (born 1967), Canadian actress
- Nicolás Orsini (born 1994), Argentine footballer
- Richard Orsini, 13th-century ruler in Italy and the Balkans
- Umberto Orsini (born 1934), Italian stage, television, and film actor
- Valentino Orsini (1927–2001), Italian film director
- Orsini family, Italian noble family, including:
  - Alessandro Orsini (cardinal) (1592–1626), cardinal
  - Clarice Orsini (1453–1488), wife of Lorenzo de' Medici, mother of Pope Leo X
  - Fulvio Orsini (1529–1600), Italian historian
  - Giordano Orsini (died 1438) (died 1438), 15th-century Italian cardinal
  - Giordano Orsini (died 1173) (died 1173), Catholic prelate
  - Giorgio Orsini (1410–1475), architect and sculptor
  - Pope Nicholas III, born Giovanni Gaetano Orsini
  - Giovanni Gaetano Orsini (cardinal) (c.1285–1335), nephew of Pope Nicholas III
  - John II Orsini (died 1335), known as the Despot of Epirus
  - Latino Orsini (1411–1477), Catholic cardinal
  - Latino Malabranca Orsini (d. 1294), Catholic prelate
  - Matteo Orsini (d. 1340), Catholic prelate
  - Napoleone Orsini (1420–1480), condottiero and papal commander
  - Paolo Orsini (1369-1416), condottiero
  - Paolo Orsini (1450-1503), condottiero
  - Paolo Giordano I Orsini (1541–1585), first duke of Bracciano
  - Paolo Giordano II Orsini (1591–1656), nobleman
  - Pope Benedict XIII, born Pietro Francisco Orsini
  - Rinaldo Orsini (d. 1450), Lord of Piombino
  - Virginio Orsini (1434–1497), Lord of Bracciano
  - Domenico Napoleone Orsini (b. 1948), Duke of Gravina

== See also ==
- Ursini (disambiguation)
- Orsoni, people with this surname
