= Duchy of Bracciano =

Former fief of the Papal States

The Duchy of Bracciano was a fief of the Papal States, centred on lago di Bracciano and the town of Bracciano itself and ruled by a branch of the Orsini family with the title of Lord (from 1417) and Duke (1560–1696).

== History ==
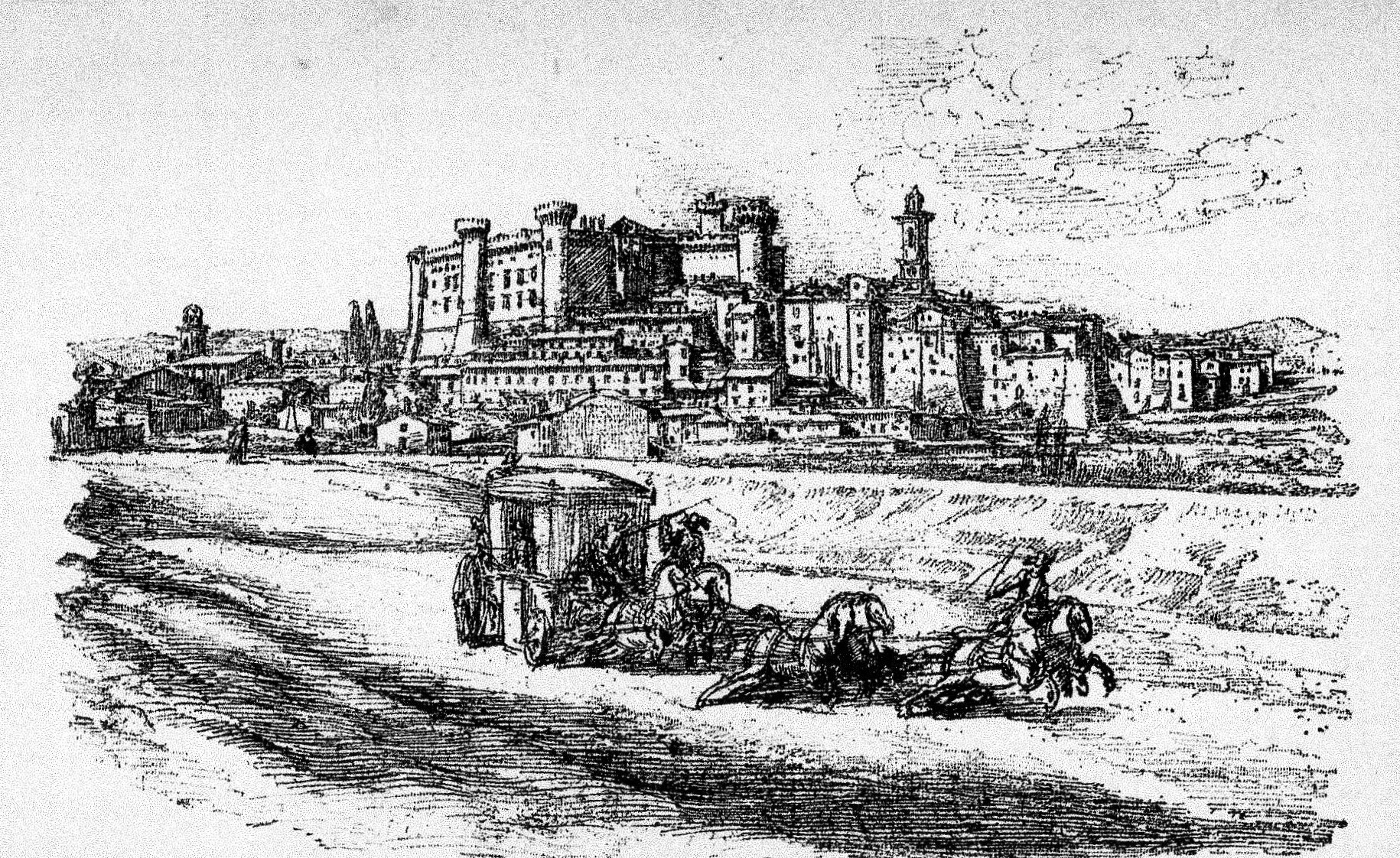

The Orsini ruled Bracciano from 1417, when Charles, a descendant of Napoleone Orsini (died c. 1267), was made lord of Bracciano by Pope Martin V. On Charles' death in 1445 the lordship was inherited by Napoleone Orsini (also count of Tagliacozzo), Gentile Virginio, Gian Giordano, Girolamo and Paolo Giordano I Orsini. In 1558 Paolo Giordano I married Cosimo I de' Medici's daughter Isabella de' Medici. To gain the Medici's consent to the match, Pope Pius IV promoted Bracciano to a dukedom and added to its territories, giving the Orsini greater financial resources. The Orsini took full advantage of this, building a new aqueduct and using its water to mine sulphur and iron and manufacture tapestries. After church power had been consolidated, the new duke moved against the barons and gradually placed all the fiefdoms under his complete control.

The classic feudal rights were conferred on the new duke - imposing tribute, minting coins (a right he did not take up), political asylum, the so-called 'mero et mixto imperio' (i.e. exercising judicial power in civil and penal law). The duchy was made up of seven main lands - Bracciano, Anguillara (linked to the Orsini by personal union; technically an autonomous county, than a marquisate, ruled by the duke's eldest son), Cerveteri, Trevignano, Monterano, Campagnano and Formello, as well as twenty-five other estates, such as Palo and Viano.

Vassals of the pope and the king of Spain, the various Orsini branches had accumulated a vast set of lands, reaching from the counties of Tagliacozzo (origin of the Bracciano line), Alba and Carsoli, through the viceregality of Naples and the areas around Subiaco and Lake Bracciano and ending at the Tyrrhenian Sea near castello di Palo, watching over the most important main roads into Rome. Napoleone I Orsini had chosen Bracciano as his capital and turned it into a major military stronghold and an elegant lordly court. The family used Monte Giordano as their palace in Rome and were buried in the collegiate church of Santo Stefano in Bracciano.

After the tragic events surrounding the marriages of Paolo Giordano I, Isabella de' Medici and Vittoria Accoramboni, the most notable duke was his grandson Paolo Giordano II, who became a prince of the Holy Roman Empire (1623) and prince-consort of Piombino through his marriage to the art-lover Isabella Appiani. However, the duchy started to fall into a decline since its ruling family now lived so far away and showed so little interest in it. The final duke, Flavio, was short of money and little by little sold off the duchy's lands to the Chigi and del Grillo families. He finally sold Bracciano itself and the title of duke to the Odescalchi in 1696 - they still own the castle. After his death his widow Marie Anne de La Trémoille moved to Madrid, where Philip IV of Spain made her camarera mayor to queen Maria Luisa of Savoy. However, in 1714, Marie Anne was dismissed by Elisabetta Farnese for her continued interference in Spanish politics and returned to Rome, where she died in 1722. The inalienable lands and ducal rank were thus transferred to the Odescalchi before finally being re-absorbed into the Papal States by Pope Innocent XII. In 1803 the Torlonia family bought the ducal title and the castle but later the Princes Odescalchi bought back them.

== List of lords and dukes of Bracciano ==
=== Lords ===
Name	Period	Wife	Notes
Carlo Orsini	1417–1445	Paola Gironima Orsini di Tagliacozzo	
Napoleone	1445–1480	Francesca Orsini di Monterotondo	Also count of Tagliacozzo
Gentile Virginio	1480–1497	Isabella Orsini di Salerno	
Gian Giordano	1497–1517	Maria Cecilia d'Aragona-Napoli; Felice della Rovere (illegitimate daughter of pope Julius II	Bought castello di Palo
Girolamo	1517–1545	Francesca Sforza di Santa Fiora	
Paolo Giordano I	1545–1560	Isabella de' Medici; Vittoria Accoramboni (several attempts made to annul the marriage)	

=== Dukes ===
Name	Period	Wife	Notes
Paolo Giordano I	1560–1585	Isabella de' Medici; Vittoria Accoramboni (several attempts made to annul the marriage)	
Virginio	1585–1615	Flavia Peretti Damasceni	
Paolo Giordano II	1615–1646	Isabella Appiani, princess of Piombino	Made a prince of the Holy Roman Empire by Ferdinand II on 18 July 1623
Ferdinando	1646–1660	Giustiniana Orsini	
Flavio	1660–1696	Ippolita Ludovisi; Marie Anne de La Trémoille	Last sovereign duke, died 1698

== General sources ==
- Bandinelli, Angela Carlino, Bracciano negli occhi della memoria, Mediterranee, Roma, 2004 (in Italian).
- Carla Michelli Giaccone, Bracciano e il suo castello, Palombi, Roma, 1998 (in Italian).
- Celletti, Vincenzo, Gli Orsini di Bracciano, Palombi, Roma, 1963 (in Italian).
- Colonna, Gustavo Brigante, Gli Orsini, Ceschina, Milano, 1955 (in Italian).
- Sigismondi, Francesca, Lo Stato degli Orsini. Statuti e diritto proprio nel Ducato di Bracciano, Viella, Roma, 2004 (in Italian).
- Siligato, Anna Cavallaro-Almamaria Mignosi Tantillo-Rosella (a cura di), Bracciano e gli Orsini. Tramonto di un progetto feudale, De Luca, Roma, 1981 (in Italian).
