= Gian Giordano Orsini =

Italian nobleman and soldier (c. 1460–1517)

- IV Lord of Bracciano
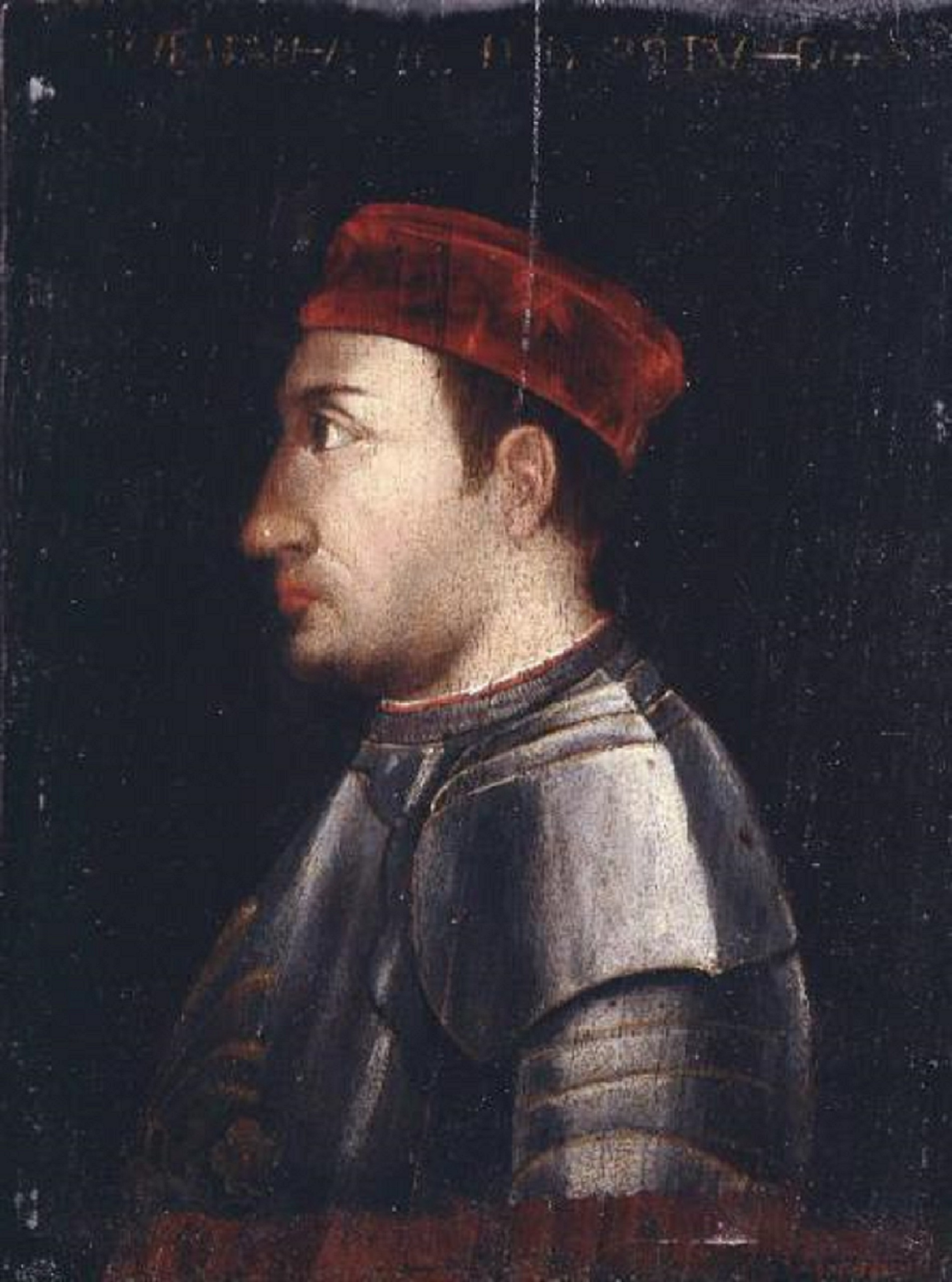
- Arms of Orsini of Bracciano family
- Reign: 8 January 1497–12 October 1517
- Predecessor: Gentile Virginio Orsini
- Successor: Girolamo Orsini
- Born: c. 1460; Bracciano
- Died: 1517; Vicovaro
- Noble family: Orsini
- Spouses: Maria Cecilia of Naples (m. 1486) Felice della Rovere (m. 1506)
- Issue: First marriage Napoleone Orsini; Francesca Orsini; Carlotta Orsini; Second marriage Giulia Orsini; Giulio Orsini; Francesco Orsini; Girolamo Orsini, V Lord of Bracciano; Clarice Orsini
- Father: Gentile Virginio Orsini
- Mother: Isabella Orsini

Gian Giordano Orsini, IV Lord of Bracciano (c. 1460–1517) was an Italian nobleman and condottiero. He married Felice della Rovere and was the son-in-law of Pope Julius II.

== Biography ==
Gian Giordano Orsini was born around 1460 in Bracciano. He was the son of Gentile Virginio Orsini, III Lord of Bracciano, and of his wife Isabella Orsini.

In 1482 he was captain of the papal army of Sixtus IV against the Duke of Calabria Alfonso II of Naples. He participated in the Battle of Campomorto alongside the famous Roberto Malatesta.

In 1495 he was captain of King Charles VIII of France against the Kingdom of Naples of King Ferrante and his son Alfonso. He was captured and released only after two years. In this period, some possessions of the Orsini family were assigned to the rival Colonna family.

Once free, he escaped an attack ordered by the Colonnas and took refuge in France, at the court of Louis XII.

In 1511 his father-in-law, Pope Julius II, negotiated a peace with the Colonnas and recalled Gian Giordano to Italy.

He died in Vicovaro on 12 October 1517.

== Issue ==
Gian Giordano Orsini married twice. In 1486 he married Maria Cecilia of Naples, an illegitimate daughter of King Ferrante of Naples by Eulalia Ravignani. They had one son and two daughters:

- Napoleone (1500–17 February 1534), condottiero, killed by his half-brother Girolamo.
- Francesca, who married Giovanni Cardona and later, in 1516, Lorenzo dell’Anguillara.
- Carlotta, who married Giantommaso Pico della Mirandola on 28 October 1519. They had three sons, Girolamo, Virginio and Giovanni Antonio, and a daughter, Maddalena.

In 1506 he married Felice della Rovere, illegitimate daughter of Cardinal Giuliano della Rovere (from 1513 Pope Julius II)

They had three sons and two daughters:

- Giulia Orsini (1507–1537). She married Pietro Antonio Sanseverino, IV prince of Bisignano, and had two daughters, Eleonora "Dianora", poet and wife of Ferdinando de Alarcón y Mendoza; and Felicia, who married Antonio Orsini, V Duke of Gravina.
- Giulio Orsini (August 1508–1508). He lived only few months.
- Francesco Orsini (17 May 1512–April 1560). Bishop of Tricarico between 1539 and 1544.
- Girolamo Orsini (7 July 1513–3 November 1540), V Lord of Bracciano. He married Francesca Sforza di Santa Fiore, daughter of Bosio II Sforza, XI Count of Santa Fiora, and his wife Costanza Farnese, natural daughter of Pope Paulus III. They had a daughter, Felicia (1535–1596), who married Marcantonio II Colonna and had with him seven children, and a son, Paolo Giordano I Orsini, who married first Isabella de' Medici and had with her a daughter, Francesca Eleonora, and a son, Virginio; and later married Vittoria Accoramboni, without issue.
- Clarice Orsini (1514–before 1562). She married Luigi Carafa della Stadera and had a son, Antonio.

== Honours ==
- Order of the Ermine - 1487
- Order of Saint Michael

== Sources ==
- Murphy, Caroline P. (2005). The Pope's Daughter: The Extraordinary Life of Felice della Rovere. New York: Oxford University Press. ISBN 978-0-19-518268-2.
- Pompeo Litta, Orsini di Roma, in Famiglie celebri italiane, Torino, 1846.
