= Felice della Rovere =

Illegitimate daughter of Pope Julius II

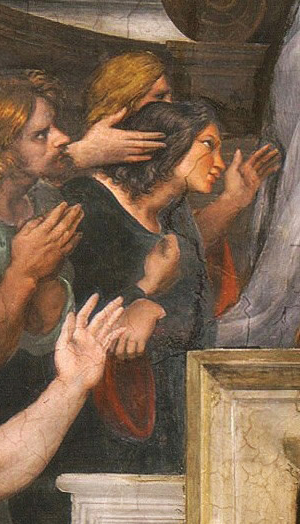
- Felice portrayed by Raphael in The Mass at Bolsena (1511), as identified by Murphy
- Born: c. 1483; Rome, Papal States
- Died: 27 September 1536 (aged 52–53); Rome, Papal States
- Spouse: Gian Giordano Orsini (m. 1506; died 1517)
- Children: Giulia; Giulio; Francesco; Girolamo; Clarice
- Parents: Pope Julius II (father); Lucrezia Normanni (mother)

Felice della Rovere (c. 1483 – 27 September 1536), also known as Madonna Felice, was the illegitimate daughter of Pope Julius II. One of the most powerful women of the Italian Renaissance, she was born in Rome around 1483 to Lucrezia Normanni and Cardinal Giuliano della Rovere (later Pope Julius II). Felice was well educated, became accepted into close courtly circles of aristocratic families, and formed friendships with scholars and poets through her education and genuine interest in humanism. Through the influence of her father, including an arranged marriage to Gian Giordano Orsini, she wielded extraordinary wealth and influence both within and beyond the Roman Curia. In particular, she negotiated peace between Julius II and the Queen of France, and held the position of Orsini Signora for over a decade following the death of her husband in 1517. Felice further increased her power through a castle that she bought with money received from her father, the Castle at Palo, and through her involvement in the grain trade.

Felice gave birth to two surviving sons, Francesco and Girolamo, choosing the second as the heir to the Orsini fortune (and thus ensuring a rivalry with her stepson, Napoleone), as well as two daughters, Giulia and Clarice; another child died during infancy. Felice's children married into prominent families: the Colonna, Sforza, Borghese, Gonzaga, and Appiani. Her Orsini offspring became the dukes of Bracciano and their lines maintained this role until 1699, when the family line became extinct. Felice's legacy lasts to this day, as the scholar Caroline Murphy has identified her in two artworks: Raphael's The Mass at Bolsena, and a portrait of an unknown woman by Sebastiano del Piombo. Felice had an influence on other Renaissance icons as well, evident from her correspondences with figures such as Catherine de' Medici.

== Early life ==
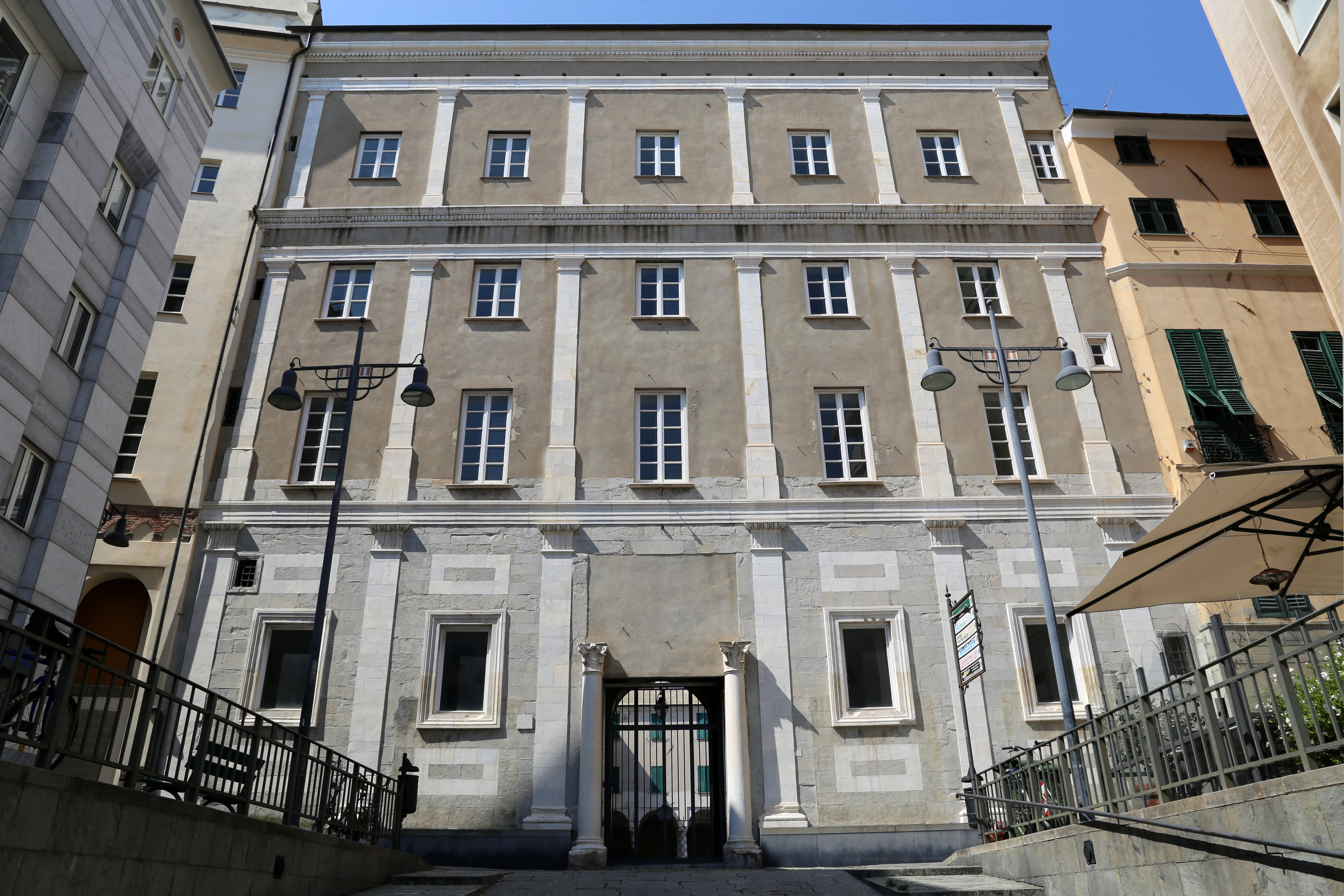
Palazzo della Rovere in Savona, where Felice spent her young adult years

The exact date of Felice della Rovere's birth is not known. She is believed to have been born in Rome, most likely in the year 1483. Felice's mother, Lucrezia Normanni, was born in Trastevere in Rome. Felice's maternal lineage can be traced back to the 11th century, which, at the time of Felice's birth, would have made the Normanni one of Rome's oldest families. Felice's father, Giuliano della Rovere, was born in the coastal village of Albissola in Liguria. In his youth, Giuliano was a member of the Franciscan order before being made Archbishop of Avignon by his uncle, Pope Sixtus IV. It is likely that Giuliano and Lucrezia had a brief relationship after meeting in Trastevere, where Giuliano was known to visit. Felice grew up alongside two siblings, a half-brother named Gian Domenico and a half-sister, Francesca, both of whom were born after her mother's marriage to Bernardino de Cupis. Felice's stepfather was employed by Cardinal Girolamo Basso della Rovere as a maestro di casa, and oversaw the cardinal's servants. Bernardino was well-rewarded by the della Rovere family and his earnings comfortably supported Felice and her family. Felice spent her early years in the de Cupis Palace in the Piazza Navona in Rome. After her father attempted to have the Borgia pope, Alexander VI, deposed in 1494, Felice was taken away from Rome and brought to the Palazzo della Rovere in Savona where she would be safe from Borgia retaliation.

== Education ==
Growing up in the Palazzo de Cupis in the Piazza Navona, a lively societal centre of Rome, meant that Felice was likely surrounded by important businessmen, merchants, lawyers, and apostolic secretaries who often visited her home. As she grew older, Felice was genuinely interested in humanist scholarship and formed friendships with scholars and poets who visited the Vatican. Giovanni Filoteo Achillini, an Italian philosopher and poet, described Felice in his poem Viridario, calling her honourable and worthy of praise. She also became close with Scipione Carteromacho, a humanist scholar whose ties to a well-known publisher allowed Felice to acquire many books in both Latin and Italian. Felice was an enthusiastic reader, evidenced by her large book collection. Through her relationships with both Italian and visiting scholars, she came to own a collection of manuscript books by ancient authors as well as many unnamed books, although they had little monetary value. It is speculated that she used her interests in education and humanism to gain acceptance into the close courtly circles of the wealthy and powerful Medici and Gonzaga families.

== First marriage ==
Felice's father arranged a marriage for her when she was 14 or 15 years old. The identity of her first husband is unknown, but he was probably from Savona or Genoa and likely had strong political ties to his community that would have benefited Giuliano.

Not much information is available about this brief marriage (denied by some historians), except that the man died in early 1502 due to unknown circumstances, and the experience probably caused Felice to be hesitant to remarry. Following the death of her first husband, Felice rejected many prospective husbands and refused to marry Roberto Sanseverino, Prince of Salerno, a man favoured by her father.

Upon her husband's death, Felice likely received the dowry that was given on her marriage and this share of money would only be available to her while she remained unmarried. It is likely that Felice did not want to give up the financial independence this dowry provided her, and this was possibly a contributing factor as to why she was reluctant to remarry.

== Second marriage ==
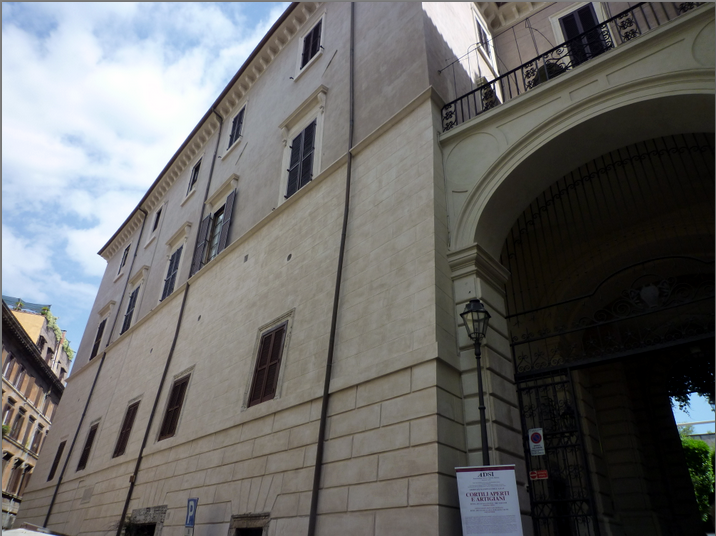
The Orsini palace of Monte Giordano in Rome

After becoming pope in 1503, Pope Julius II aimed to find Felice a second husband. This was a difficult task because Felice was not a popular choice for marriage: she was the illegitimate daughter of a pope and did not appear to be beloved by him, and she was 20, rendering her an unappealing match due to her older age. A match was eventually made with Gian Giordano Orsini, son of Gentile Virginio Orsini, Lord of Bracciano, and the leader of two of Rome's most powerful aristocratic families. This was an excellent match for Felice as it allowed her to stay in Rome. This match was also very beneficial for Pope Julius II, who wanted to end the bloody feud between the Orsini and Colonna families. He accomplished this by gaining influence in both families by marrying his niece, Lucrezia, into the Colonna family, and Felice into the Orsini family. Gian Giordano was 20 years Felice's senior, and worked as a condottiere. He had previously been married to king Ferdinand I of Naples' illegitimate daughter, Maria D'Aragona of Naples, who had born him three children: Napoleone, Carlotta, and Francesca, before dying in 1504. Felice's dowry was 15,000 ducats, which was worth less than the dowry given to Lucrezia, who had received 10,000 ducats, but also a palace at the church of Dodici Apostoli, and the town of Frascati. Scholars believe that Pope Julius II's unfriendly treatment of Felice was due to his desire to differentiate himself from his predecessor and rival, Pope Alexander VI, who had practised extreme nepotism, particularly by parading his daughter around Rome. Felice's father further humiliated her by forbidding any major festivities for her wedding and by not attending. The wedding took place on the 24 and 25 May 1506, and was held at the Cancelleria (modern: Palazzo Sforza Cesarini), a palace then in disrepair.

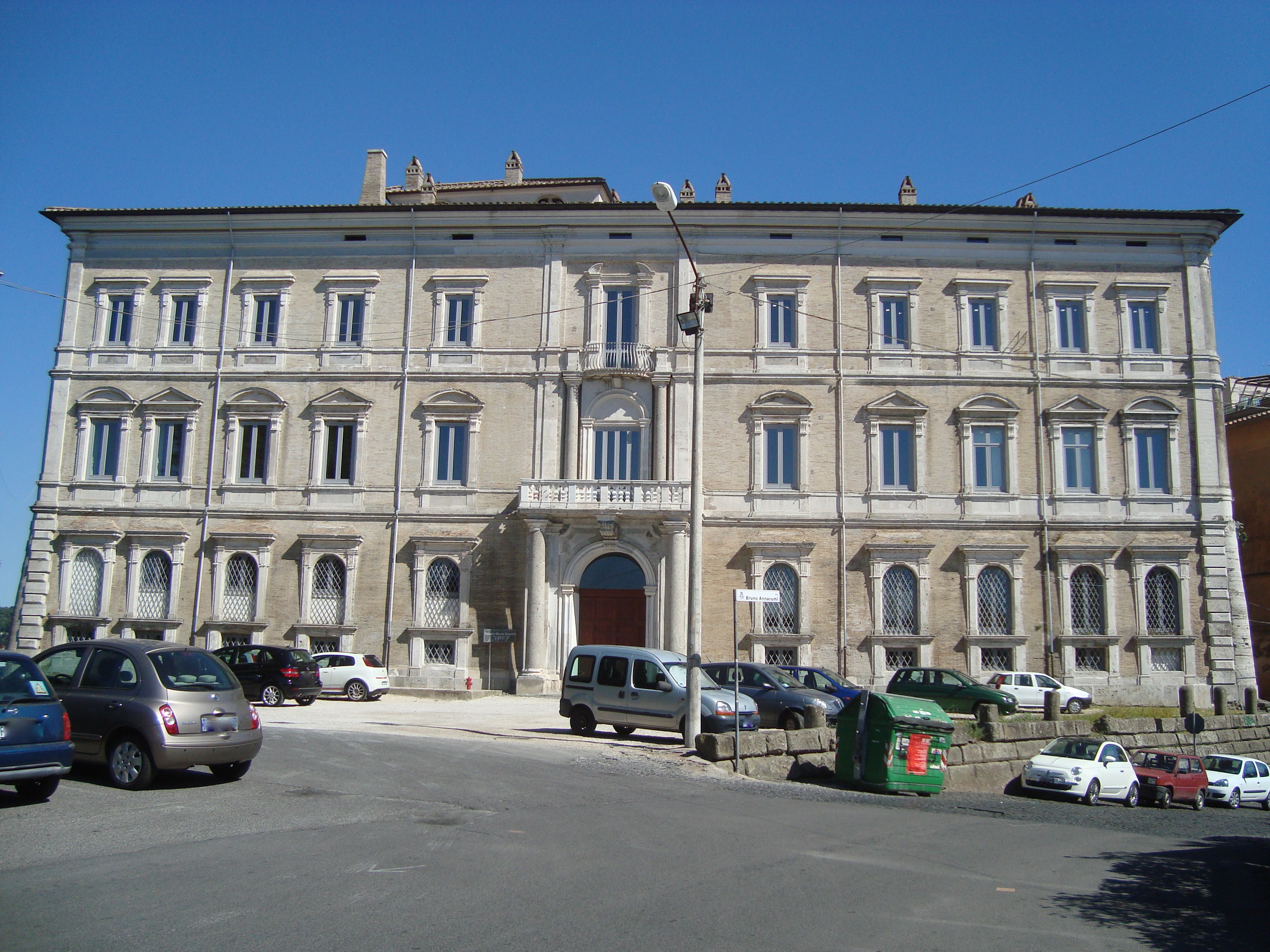
Cancelleria (modern: Palazzo Sforza Cesarini) the location of Felice's marriage to Gian Giordano in 1506

Some scholars have hypothesised the marriage as an unhappy one, claiming that Gian Giordano mocked Felice for being the bastard daughter of a pope, but evidence suggests that Gian Giordano came to like Felice's "managerial qualities and diplomatic skills", and encouraged Felice to pursue her ambitions. In the first two years of marriage Felice's main objective was to give birth to a son, who would guarantee her security within the Orsini family, exclude her stepson, Napoleone Orsini, from receiving the Orsini lordship, and make her the regent of the family should Gian Giordano die while her son was a minor. Without a son, Felice risked losing the power and wealth gained from her marriage.

=== Reconciliation with her father ===
When Pope Julius II refused to attend the wedding he arranged for his daughter and Gian Giordano, it is believed that Felice interpreted this as a lack of respect on the part of her father and was resentful towards him. These feelings created a rift between Felice and her father that lasted for a few months. In an effort to reconcile, Julius II invited Felice and her new husband to the Vatican in late June 1506 and held a lavish banquet in their honour.

Following this reconciliation, Julius II frequently made Felice the guest of honour at various parties in Rome, where oftentimes she was the only woman present. Felice's presence at various events in Rome throughout this period helped elevate her to a position of power within the Vatican court. In addition, the Pope gifted Felice with extravagant jewellery and significant sums of money, including an item that would become one of her most prized possessions: a diamond cross originally given to her father from the Republic of Venice.

=== Economic activities ===
==== Castle at Palo ====
During her marriage, Felice was given her own personal assets, which allowed her to become a wealthy woman in her own right. Her main source of income was the estate and castle at Palo, a pre-existing property in modern-day Ladispoli. Acquired in 1509, this castle provided both income and a method through which to increase both her influence and her family's power. She did this primarily by establishing the estate as a papal residence. The castle was granted this status by her father when he was pope, and continued on after his pontificate ended. This prior use of the estate as a papal residence led to subsequent papal figures such as Pope Leo X being hosted at the castle. The grounds around Palo were suitable for hunting, which helped to attract these prominent guests, and eventually led to the property also being recognized as an official papal hunting lodge. Felice was able to set up the residence as a hunting lodge by brokering a deal with Leo X. He agreed to pay for the necessary repairs and upgrades the castle would need to turn it into a luxury property, and in exchange, Felice allowed Leo X to stay at Palo for free. By employing the castle as a financial asset and opening it up to high-ranking guests, Felice was able to promote both the image of the della Rovere family as a whole, as well as her own image.

==== Grain trade ====
Besides property-owning, Felice also used the grain trade as a source of income. This involvement in business gave Felice experience that would help to support her both during her marriage and after her husband's death. The fields on her Palo property were well-suited for growing grain, and could produce a significant amount of wheat, as attested to by the entries written by Felice's servants in the account books for the estate. However, during the 1533–1534 grain crisis in Rome, Felice's revenue suffered. The reasons for the crisis were mainly a bout of poor weather conditions and an underdeveloped transportation system. As a result, Rome had to import grain from other areas of Italy, and this often led to the price of grain being doubled. As Felice's property was located close to Rome itself, she mainly sold her grain directly to people in and around the city and was therefore affected by the bad harvest. As well, grain suppliers located in Northern Italy were able to abuse the system during this time because the supply of grain in Rome itself was so poor, allowing them to charge steep prices. This left local suppliers such as Felice in a dire situation. During this crisis, Felice had to resort to bargaining to get a better price for her grain. Felice's individuality is revealed through actions such as these, as haggling was not something upper-class women were supposed to do. Ultimately, despite these struggles, Felice was able to use the grain trade to increase her wealth.

== Role in peace negotiations between the Papal States and France ==
In 1510, in the midst of the Italian Wars, Pope Julius II wanted to eliminate France's presence in Northern Italy. In order to accomplish this, the Pope dissolved the League of Cambrai, originally established in 1508 as an anti-Venetian alliance between France and the Papal States. In place of the League of Cambrai, the Pope established the Holy League, forming an alliance between the Papal States and Venice. The exclusion of France from the Holy League caused tension to escalate between Julius II and Louis XII. After the Papal States lost Bologna to France, Julius II agreed to negotiate with Louis XII. Negotiations were held between Bishop Andrew Forman and others, including Felice's husband, Gian Giordano Orsini. Julius II sent Felice to accompany Gian Giordano to France in July 1511 where she was involved in negotiations with Queen Anne of Brittany for two years.

== Issue ==
Felice and Gian Giordano had five children, four of whom survived into adulthood. Felice was a very involved mother: she named her children, a task typically given to the godparents at baptism, hired their wetnurses, and managed their financial affairs. She was also primarily responsible for the upbringing of her surviving sons, Francesco and Girolamo, who were ages four and five when their father died in 1517.

Felice had three sons and two daughters:

- Giulia Orsini (1507–1537). In 1521 she married Pietro Antonio Sanseverino, IV prince of Bisignano, and had two daughters, Eleonora "Dianora", poet and wife of Ferdinando de Alarcón y Mendoza; and Felicia, who married Antonio Orsini, V Duke of Gravina.
- Giulio Orsini (August 1508–1508). He lived only a few months.
- Francesco Orsini (17 May 1512– April 1560). Bishop of Tricarico between 1539 and 1544. He married in articulo mortis his lover Faustina de Bilizone, with whom he had issue.
- Girolamo Orsini (7 July 1513– 3 Novembre 1540), V Lord of Bracciano. On 14 October 1547 He married Francesca Sforza di Santa Fiore (c. 1522 - 1548), daughter of Bosio II Sforza, XI Count of Santa Fiora, and his wife Costanza Farnese, natural daughter of Pope Paulus III. They had a daughter, Felicia (February 1540 - 25 July 1596), who married Marcantonio II Colonna and had with him seven children, and a son, Paolo Giordano I Orsini, who married first Isabella de' Medici and had with her a daughter, Francesca Eleonora, and a son, Virginio; and later married Vittoria Accoramboni, without issue. On 22 May 1534 he saw his assets confiscated and sentenced to death by Pope Clement VII for the murder of his half-brother, but he was pardoned and rehabilitated by Pope Paul III the following year. He died from the consequences of injuries sustained in an ambush.
- Clarice Orsini (1514–before 1562). She married Luigi Carafa della Stadera and had a son, Antonio.

=== Relationship with her stepson Napoleone ===
Some of the Orsini family viewed Felice as an evil stepmother because her sons displaced Napoleone's claims to inheritance. Under his father, Felice appointed Napoleone abbot through an endowment of the Abbey of Farfa, an estate over 200 square kilometres in size, and had Napoleone granted an additional income of 1,000 ducats a month under Pope Leo X. Felice believed Napoleone to be an aggressive boy and feared that he would hurt her sons in an attempt to regain the inheritance. To protect herself and her sons, Felice kept Napoleone at a distance and ensured that he did not receive a cardinal's hat under Pope Leo X. Napoleone would later be killed by his half-brother Girolamo, who had inherited the father's titles, in 1534.

=== Marriages ===
As the Orsini Signora, Felice had a role in orchestrating the marriages of her stepchildren and her children. In October 1519, Felice secured her stepdaughter Carlotta's marriage to Giantommaso Pico, lord of Mirandola. Because Felice was not Carlotta's mother, she required the approval of Napoleone and other Orsini males. Felice then married her daughter Giulia to Pietro Antonio di Sanseverino, the ruler of Bisignano. They agreed upon a dowry of 40,000 ducats and a cardinal's hat to a member of Pier Antonio's family in exchange for 24,000 ducats: 8,000 for Pope Leo X and 16,000 for Felice. This marriage benefitted Felice by providing her with funds and a strong ally in the South, but it also came with consequences: the union angered members of the Orsini family because it involved a Southern family, the dowry was twice the size of Carlotta's, and it angered Napoleone who felt that the cardinal's hat given away was rightfully his.

Napoleone forfeited his claim to the Abbey of Farfa to Francesco when he married Claudia Colonna. After the Sack of Rome, Felice married Clarice to Don Luigi Carafa, the Prince of Stigliano, whose family was on good terms with the Spanish, providing Felice an Imperial ally. Francesco had many illegitimate children and married in articulo mortis his lover Faustina di Bilizone. Felice arranged for Girolamo to marry Francesca Sforza, daughter of Count Bosio of Santa Fiora, but this union did not occur until October 1537, a year after Felice's death.

== Widowhood ==
Gian Giordano became ill in September 1517 and made a living will bestowing the authority to act as Orsini regent to Felice after his death while their sons were still minors. Giovanni Roberta della Colle, one of Gian Giordano's chiefs of staff, was present when the living will was made, and records that Gian Giordano said: "I shall leave my wife, that is Madonna Felice, named as Lady and Guardian of the children and of the estate because she has been such a woman and such a wife, and so rightly she merits such an honour." This announcement was very publicly made to ensure that the Orsini family would have no grounds to oppose Felice becoming the Lady and Guardian of the estate because she was a woman, not an Orsini by blood, or not of Roman nobility. Gian Giordano died on 11 October at his castle in Vicovaro and left all of his worldly possessions to his sons Francesco, Girolamo, and Napoleone. His appointment of Felice made her one of the most powerful figures in Rome, a position scholars note she was well prepared for due to her humanist education. Pope Leo X ratified this position by writing a bull stating that Felice would be the guardian and caretaker of Gian Giordano Orsini's children as long as she remained a widow.

There were some rumours surrounding Gian Giordano's death, as Marino Sanuto recorded that Gian Giordano had died without receiving confession or communion because doctors did not think he was ill, indicating that Felice may have been responsible for his death, rendering her fortuitous appointment as the head of the Bracciano Orsini clan unlawful. Some members of the Orsini household rallied behind the 17-year-old Napoleone as the rightful leader, but this did not gain power as Leo X had proclaimed his support for Felice, and there was no additional proof of any suspicious activity surrounding Gian Giordano's death.

== Sack of Rome ==
In 1527, Felice was not staying in the Orsini Palace at Monte Giordano when the Sack of Rome began, and this likely saved her life, as it was one of the first palaces to be attacked. She and her children were with her mother, Lucrezia, and half-siblings Gian Domenico and Francesca at the De Cupis palace when the Sack began. They decided that it would be safest to divide by gender and flee Rome. The women dressed in plain clothes, hid their jewels underneath their dresses and went to Isabella d'Este's rented castle, Dodici Apostoli, which provided refuge to 1200 noblewomen and 1000 noblemen and was one of the only palaces not attacked because Isabella's son was a chief lieutenant leading the attack. The palace was soon put under ransom. Felice paid for herself and a few others, including 2000 ducats for her nephew Cristofano. Felice and her family then fled Rome for Ostia where they took a boat to Civitavecchia and were united with the rest of Felice's family. The family split up again because Felice wanted to be far from Rome to protect her children from Napoleone, who was stationed at Felice's Bracciano estate with some followers. Felice feared that Napoleone might use the chaos of the sack as an opportunity to kill his half-siblings and reclaim what he believed to be his rightful inheritance of the Orsini lordship. Felice and her children went to stay with her cousins in the Duchy of Urbino, where she received a palace in the hillside town of Fossombrone. In Fossombrone, Felice helped noblemen and women in Rome, sending money and coordinating supplies.

The Sack of Rome ended in 1528, but Felice did not immediately return to Rome because Napoleone had set up a force fighting against the Imperial attackers in Bracciano. Soon after, the Imperial forces dispelled Napoleone, and Felice felt safe returning. Once in Rome, Felice had the Orsini estate of Monte Giordano rebuilt for the sake of her sons and the family's reputation. Her property near Trinità dei Monti had also been ransacked and destroyed, so she had it rebuilt. The Sack of Rome had significantly changed Felice's life, and for the first time in her life she was poor.

It is presumed she died on 27 September 1536 because there is no mention about her later on that date.

== Presence in art ==
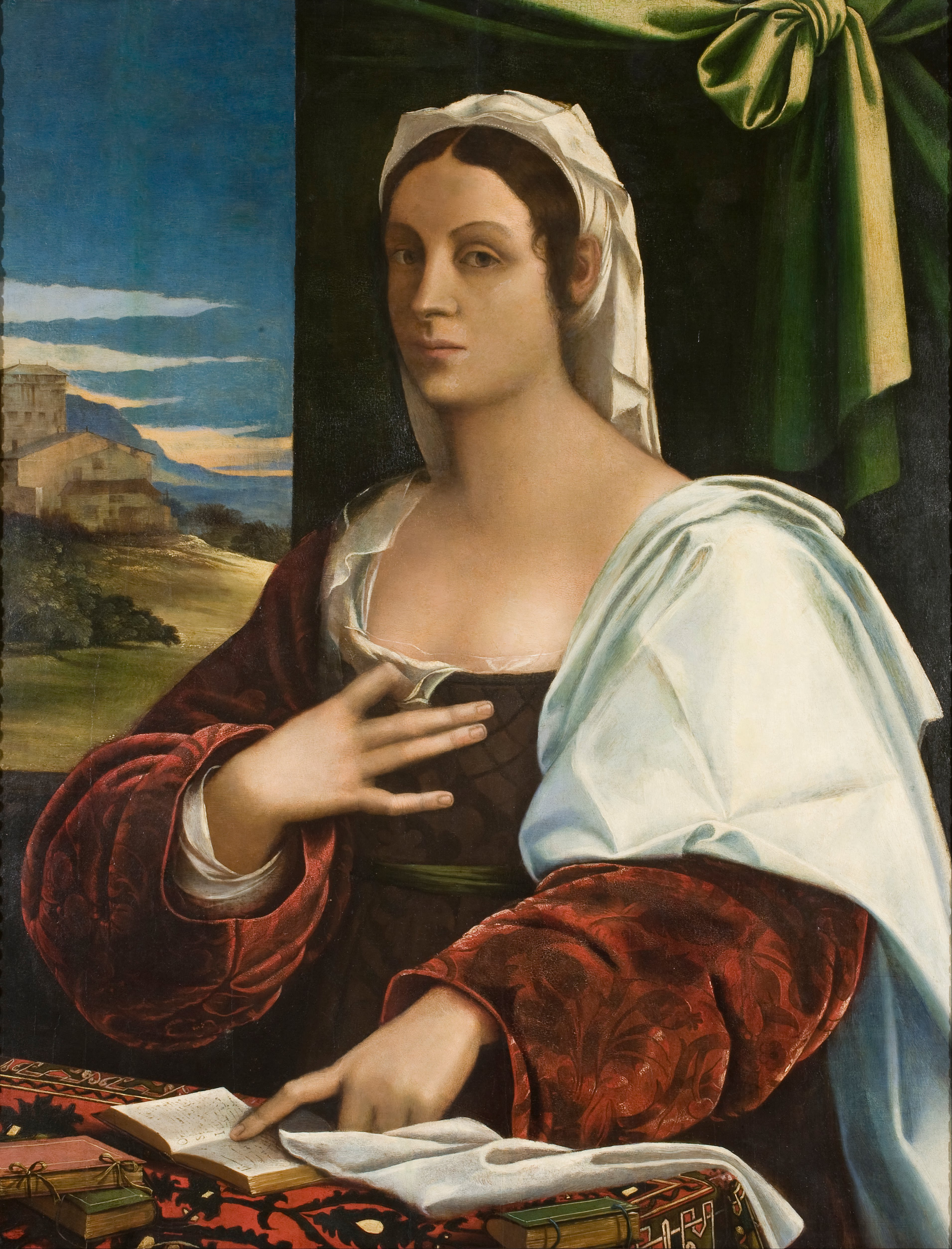
Portrait of an unknown woman by Sebastiano del Piombo, possibly Felice, as suggested by Murphy.

Though no official portraiture of Felice has been identified, Caroline Murphy has suggested two works might be depictions of Felice. These are Raphael's The Mass at Bolsena and Sebastiano del Piombo's portrait of an unknown woman. The Mass at Bolsena was commissioned by Julius II in 1512, and depicts the miracle of Bolsena. As Julius II was Raphael's patron, he would have influenced who exactly appeared in the painting. Both clergy and male members of the della Rovere family appear in the painting, as well as a few female figures. The figure Murphy identifies as Felice is dressed in black, kneeling, and gazing up at Julius II. She argues that this is possibly Felice because she is depicted differently from all the other female figures, who appear to be stylized. Sebastiano del Piombo was another painter who completed many works in this period, including portraiture. The fact that he was personally known to Felice, and the similarities in dress between this piece and The Mass at Bolsena, led Murphy to suggest that Sebastiano del Piombo's portrait of an unknown woman is also a depiction of Felice. Felice's presence cannot be fully confirmed as she was never properly identified in these art pieces. However, as Julius II was a patron of the arts it is likely he included his daughter in some of the paintings he commissioned.

== Legacy ==
Though Felice is less well-known than her female contemporaries such as Lucrezia Borgia and Isabella d'Este, she was a respected figure in her own time. She was acquainted with other 16th-century figures such as Catherine de' Medici and Pope Leo X, and it is clear that despite the lack of documentation on her life, she was corresponding with various important people. Catherine de' Medici, queen of France, had stayed with Felice for a short period of time as a young child and later wrote a letter thanking Felice for the care she had received. Though this letter was written long before Catherine became an important figure, Felice's good reputation can be discerned from the letter Catherine wrote to her. Another figure Felice corresponded with was Pope Leo X, who succeeded Felice's father as pope. Her reputation among high-ranking figures is reflected through her business dealings with Leo X and her hosting of him and his guests at her residence. Her reputation is also apparent in Francesco Sansovini's History of the House of Orsini, which states that Felice's granddaughter shared both her grandmother's name and good manners.

== Sources ==
- Bedini, Silvio A.; Fundação Calouste Gulbenkian (1997). The Pope's Elephant. Manchester: Carcanet Press Ltd. ISBN 978-1-85754-277-6.
- Bullard, Melissa Meriam (1982). "Grain Supply and Urban Unrest in Renaissance Rome: The Crisis of 1533–1534". In P. A. Ramsey (ed.). Rome in the Renaissance: The City and the Myth. Binghamton, New York: Center for Medieval and Early Renaissance Studies. pp. 279–292. ISBN 978-0-86698-057-9.
- Chamberlin, E. R. (1979). The Sack of Rome. London: B.T. Batsford. ISBN 0-7134-1645-9.
- Chambers, David (2006). Popes, Cardinals, and War: The Military Church in Renaissance and Early Modern Europe. New York: I. B. Tauris. ISBN 978-1-84511-178-6.
- Clough, Cecil H. (2007). "Review:The Pope's Daughter". Renaissance Studies. 21 (5): 758–760. doi:10.1111/j.1477-4658.2007.00448.x.
- Cummings, Anthony M. (2012). Pope Leo X, the Renaissance Papacy, and Music. Ann Arbor: University of Michigan Press. ISBN 978-0-472-11791-8.
- Hirst, Michael (1981). Sebastiano del Piombo. Oxford: Clarendon Press. ISBN 978-0-19-817308-3.
- Hook, Judith (1972). The Sack of Rome: 1527. London: Palgrave MacMillan. ISBN 0-333-13272-6.
- Jones, Roger; Penny, Nicholas (1983). Raphael. New Haven and London: Yale University Press. ISBN 978-0-300-04052-4.
- Meek, Christine (2007). "Review of The Pope's Daughter: The Extraordinary Life of Felice della Rovere". The Sixteenth Century Journal. 38 (3): 866–867. doi:10.2307/20478564. JSTOR 20478564.
- Murphy, Caroline P. (2005). The Pope's Daughter: The Extraordinary Life of Felice della Rovere. New York: Oxford University Press. ISBN 978-0-19-518268-2.
- Murphy, Caroline P. (2007). "Felice della Rovere and the Castello at Palo". Patronage and Dynasty: The Rise of the della Rovere in Renaissance Italy. Kirksville: Truman State University Press. pp. 112–121. ISBN 978-1-931112-60-4.
- Shaw, Christine (1993). Julius II, The Warrior Pope. Cambridge, USA: Blackwell. ISBN 978-0-631-16738-9..
- Williams, George L. (1998). Papal Genealogy: The Families and Descendants of the Popes. Jefferson: McFarland. ISBN 0-7864-0315-2.
