= Castello Orsini-Odescalchi =

Castle in Bracciano, Lazio, Italy

Castello Orsini-Odescalchi Castle Bracciano
- Bracciano, Lazio, Italy
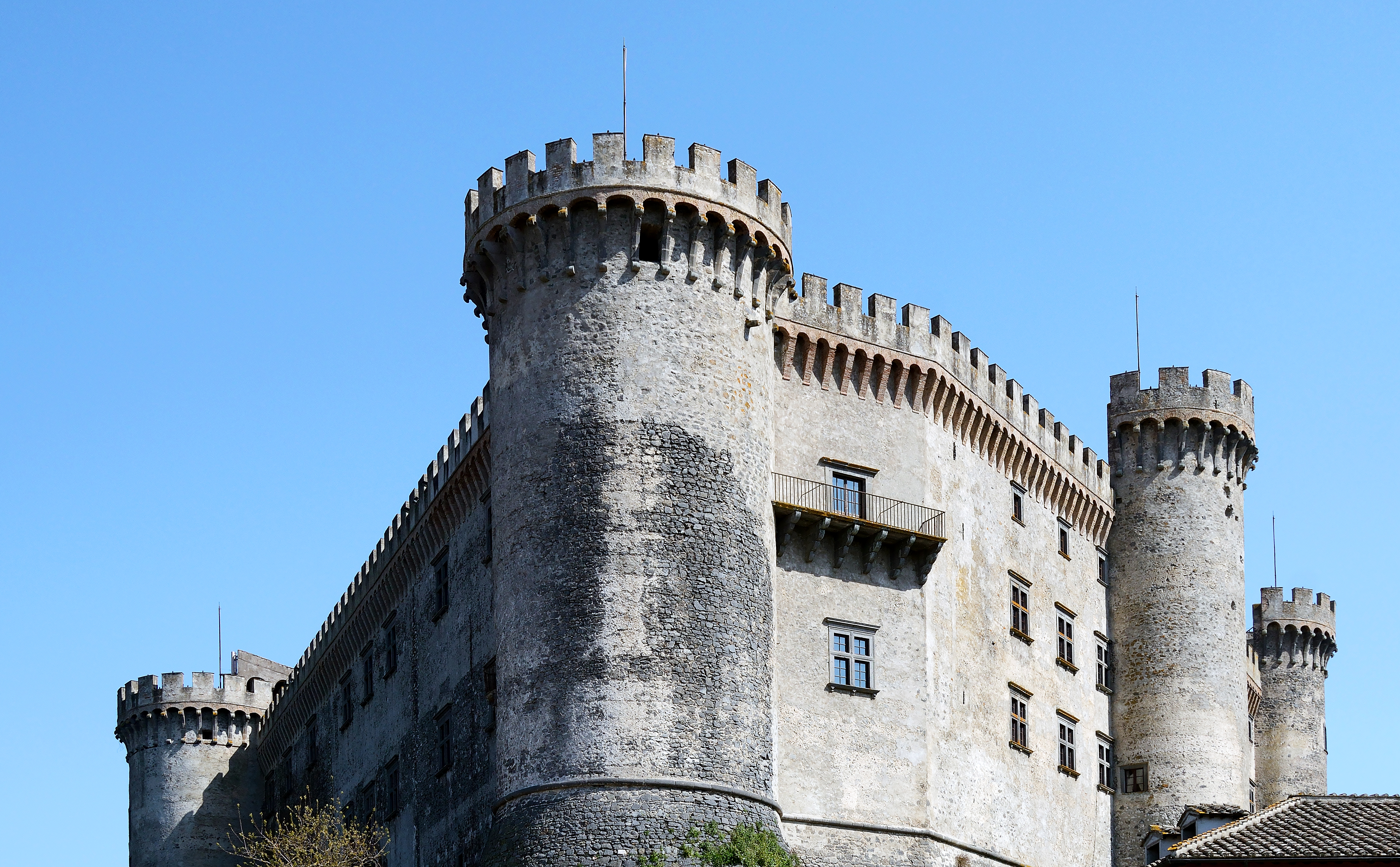
- Castello Orsini-Odescalchi

Location
- Location of Castello Orsini-Odescalchi
- Coordinates: 42.1044°N 12.1778°E

Site history
- Built: 1470–1485

Castello Orsini-Odescalchi is a castle in Bracciano, Italy. It is located on the southern shore of Lake Bracciano. It was built in the 15th century, and combines the functions of a military defence structure and a civilian residence of the feudal lords of the period, the Orsini and Borgia, both papal families. As one of the largest and best-maintained castles in Italy, it also houses a museum; as a centre of cultural events, the Castello has hosted several high-profile weddings such as those of Tom Cruise/Katie Holmes, Eros Ramazzotti/Michelle Hunziker, and Petra Ecclestone/James Stunt.

== Geography ==
The well-preserved medieval castle Castello Orsini-Odescalchi is located in the city of Bracciano, 30 km away from Rome. It is located near the western shore of the volcanic lake (Lago di Bracciano or "Sabatino", the eighth largest lake in Italy). The railway line FR3 connects it with Rome (stations of Ostiense and Valle Aurelia) in about 55 minutes. Close to it lie the two medieval towns of Anguillara Sabazia and Trevignano Romano.

== History ==
=== Early history ===
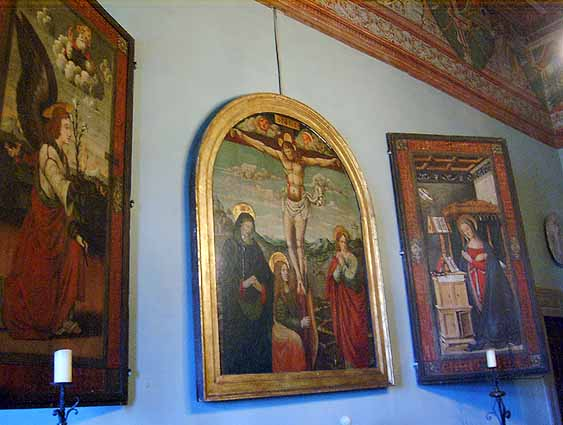
Artwork

The castle's earliest history is inferred to be linked to one of the numerous towers built in the tenth century as a defence against the Saracen attacks, as implied by the ancient name of Castrum Brachiani. In the eleventh century the neighbouring territory was acquired by the Prefetti di Vico family, who turned the tower into a castle. Ferdinand Gregorovius dated the possession of Bracciano by the Orsini to 1234. From 1375, it was a Papal possession.

In 1419, the Colonna Pope Martin V confirmed the fiefdom of Bracciano in the Orsini family branch of Tagliacozzo. Under this powerful family, Bracciano developed into a flourishing town, famous in the whole of Italy for its castle, which was enlarged, starting from 1470, by Napoleone Orsini and his son Virginio. In 1481 it was host to Pope Sixtus IV, who had fled from the plague in Rome; the Sala Papalina in one of the corner towers commemorates the event. Four years later, however, the city and the castle were ravaged by Papal troops under Prospero Colonna, and subsequently, a new line of walls was built.

The construction of the Orsini-Odescalchi Castle was started by Napoleon Orsini of the Orsini family in 1470. It was completed by his son Virginio Gentil, in 1485. Francesco di Giorgio Martini was the architect. Over the centuries of its existence, the castle has been the venue of many a conflict between Colonna and Borgia noble families. In 1494, Charles VIII of France and his troops marching against Rome stopped at Bracciano. This act led to the ex-communication of the Orsini. In 1496, the castle which was under the Orsini family who were politically well connected and prosperous, attracted the ire of Pope Alexander VI whose son Giovanni di Candia led a papal army and tried to capture it. However, the Orsinis successfully resisted the attack. Cesare Borgia, another of Alexander's natural sons, was unsuccessful in his attempt to take the Orsini stronghold a few years later. During this time the castle underwent modifications with many interior decorations created in the form of paintings and frescoes by Antoniazzo Romano, a Roman painter and sculptor of the 15th century. Pope Sixtus IV, born Francesco della Rovere, had shifted from Rome to this castle during the plague epidemic. At this time, the rooms where the Pope stayed were decorated with frescoes by the Taddeo Zuccari and Federico Zuccari brothers.

=== 16th century and later ===
The sixteenth century was a period of splendour for Bracciano and the castle. In 1558, the notorious Paolo Giordano I Orsini, marrying Isabella de' Medici, daughter of Cosimo I, Grand Duke of Tuscany, received the title of duke of Bracciano. However, the lavish life of the greedy Orsini family eventually affected the economic conditions of the city. The last great ruler was probably Paolo Giordano II, a patron of arts and literature which made Bracciano a centre of culture in Italy. The decline culminated in 1696 when the castle was sold to Livio Odescalchi, nephew of Pope Innocent XI; the Odescalchi family still retain the castle.

Emperor Leopold I, as recognition for services rendered in the war against the Turks, gave Livy, nephew of the Pope, the honorific of the Prince of the Holy Roman Empire. Subsequent to the French occupation, the castle was looted of its valuable furniture. The castle and the estate were under Duke Marino Torlonia of the Torlonia family until 1848 when it was sold to Prince Livio Odescalchi III.

== Architecture ==
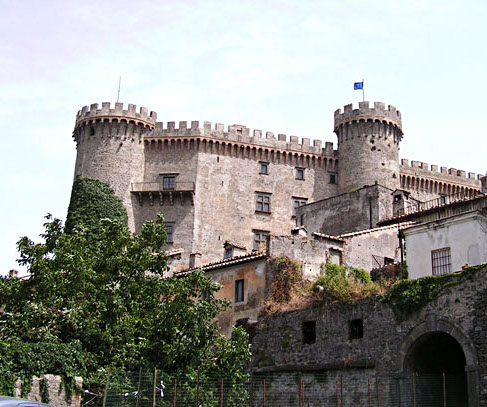
Full view of the Castle Bracciano

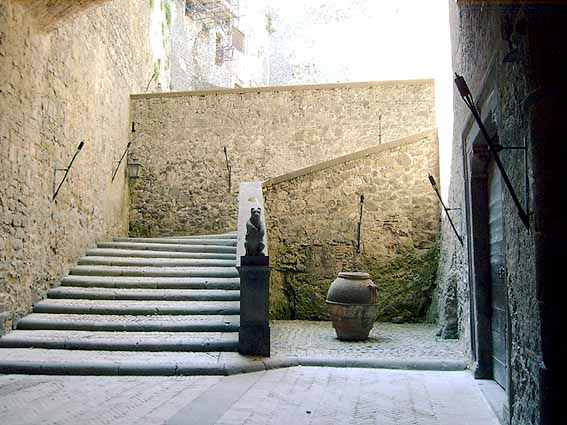
Entrance

The Castello Orsini-Odescalchi is one of the most noteworthy examples of Renaissance military architecture in Italy and is the main monument in Bracciano. The castle underwent many renovations since its inception. In the castle, richly frescoed friezes and ceilings were created. Richly coloured tapestries were made when the lords of Bracciano were in residence. The important late 15th-century frieze showing the labours of Hercules is still visible.

== Museum ==
The historical museum within the castle premises has valuable artwork from the Middle Ages of over six centuries rule of Popes and Kings, consisting of ancient weapons, furniture and paintings, books and manuscripts, frescoes and decorations. It was opened in 1952 by Prince Livio Odescalchi IV.

== Filming location ==
A number of films, TV series, and TV programs have been set in the castle: Othello, Megiddo: The Omega Code 2, More Than a Miracle, On My Way to the Crusades, I Met a Girl Who..., The Count of Monte Cristo, Incantato, Imperial Venus, The Agony and the Ecstasy, The Wedding Party, Luisa Sanfelice, Coco Chanel, Medici: Masters of Florence, Castle of the Living Dead (1964), Kath & Kimderella, and Bill & Ted's Excellent Adventure.

== Events ==
The castle has hosted a number of events, especially weddings of wealthy actors and singers. Hollywood actors Tom Cruise and Katie Holmes wed at the castle in 2006, like Martin Scorsese and Isabella Rossellini before them in 1979.

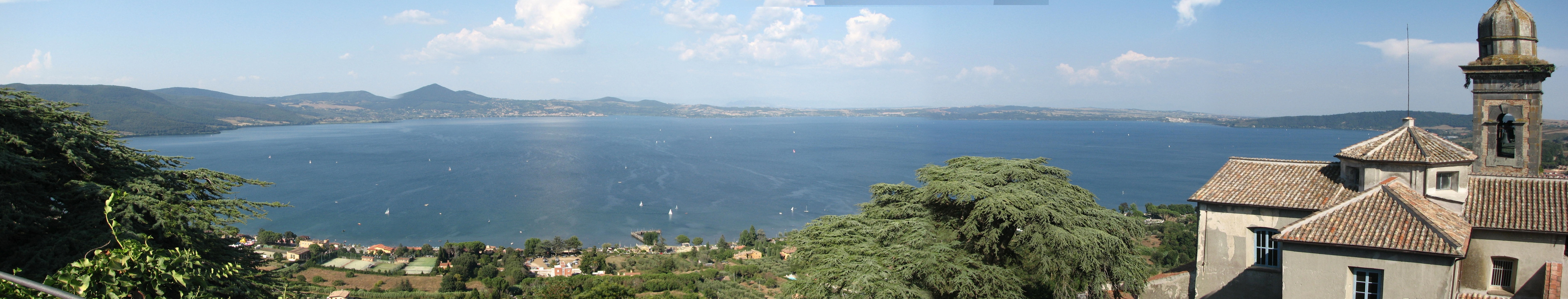
View of Lake Bracciano from Castello Orsini-Odescalchi.
