= Erba-Odescalchi =

Italian noble family

- Country: Former countries: Papal States; Kingdom of Italy; Current country: Italy
- Founded: 13th century
- Founder: Giorgio Odescalchi di Como
- Titles: Pope (non-hereditary); Prince of Bassano Romano; Duke of Bracciano; Count palatine; Count of Pisciarelli; Lord of Palo Laziale

The House of Erba-Odescalchi (IPA: [ˈɛrba odeˈskalki]) and the House of Odescalchi are branches of an Italian noble family formed by the union of the Erba and Odescalchi families. The Odescalchi family was, since the election of Benedetto Odescalchi as Pope Innocent XI in 1676, part of the highest Roman aristocracy.

== Odescalchi family ==
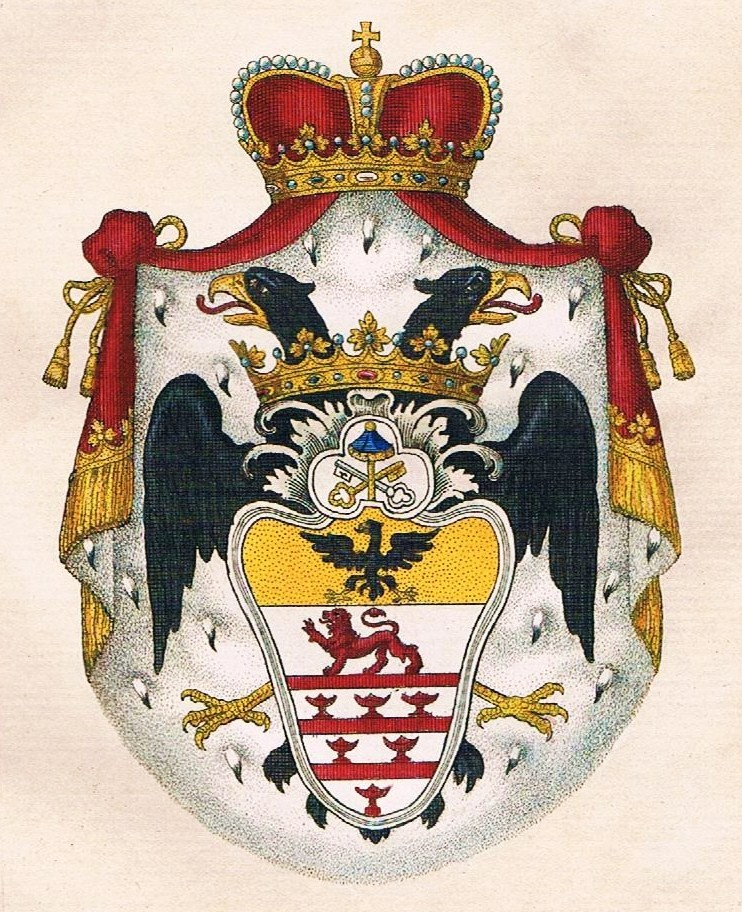
Princely coat of arms of the Odescalchi family.

The Odescalchi family were entrepreneurs from the minor nobility of Como. They trace their family line to Giorgio Odescalchi of Como, born around 1290.

Pietro Giorgio Odescalchi was Bishop of Alessandria (1598–1610) and then Bishop of Vigevano (1610–1620).

In 1619, Benedetto's brother and three uncles founded a bank in Genoa, which grew into a successful money-lending business. After completing his studies in grammar and letters, the 15-year-old Benedetto moved to Genoa to take part in the family business as an apprentice. The family established lucrative financial transactions with clients in major Italian and European cities, such as Nuremberg, Milan, Kraków, and Rome.

Benedetto Odescalchi reigned as Pope Innocent XI from 1676 until 1689. His male-line nephew Livio Odescalchi was granted by his uncle the Duchy of Ceri. After his participation to the 1683 Battle of Vienna, he was granted the Duchy of Syrmia (around Ilok Castle, now divided between Serbia and Croatia) and the dignity of prince of the Holy Roman Empire by Leopold I. He also brought the Duchy of Bracciano from the Orsini family. Livio Odescalchi died in 1713 without a male line heir and all this titles and estate went to his cousin Baldassare Erba Odescalchi.

To ensure the Odescalchi name and legacy continued, Pope Innocent XI formally adopted Lucrezia’s son, Antonio Maria Erba (1624–1694). Baldassare, who was Antonio Maria's younger son, officially took the name Odescalchi to carry on the main princely line.

The historic Palazzo Odescalchi in Rome features a façade designed by Gian Lorenzo Bernini, who utilized the influential colossal order in his 1664 design.

The Orsini-Odescalchi Castle in Bracciano, acquired by Livio Odescalchi in 1696, remains one of the most important examples of military Renaissance architecture in Italy and is operated as a private museum today .

== Erba family ==
Innocent XI's sister, Lucrezia Odescalchi, had married Alessandro Erba in 1621. The Erba family is allegedly descended from Enrico Erba, Imperial vicar of Milan around 1165. Their son Antonio Maria (1624-1694)was granted the title of marquess of Mondonico in 1684. He had three sons : Alessandro, founder of the Erba Odescalchi line, Baldassare, founder of the Odescalchi line, and Benedetto, a cardinal.

=== Erba Odescalchi line ===
Coat of arms of the Erba Odescalchi line, the other line uses the undifferentiated arms

The Erba Odescalchi line, though senior, did not inherit the bulk of the Odescalchi inheritance. They inherited the title of prince of Monteleone (in Calabria) from the Piatti family in 1749.

Antonio Maria Erba-Odescalchi, Pope Innocent's great-grandnephew and Cardinal Benedetto Erba-Odescalchi's nephew, was a Doctor in Civil and Canon Law (Milan 1733), which allowed him to pursue a career in the Papal Court in Rome as a church lawyer. He became a Protonotary Apostolic in 1737 and a Referendary (Judge) of the Two Tribunals of Justice and Grace in 1739. He was named a cardinal in 1759 and given the office of Vicar-General of the Pope for the City of Rome. He died in 1762.

The Erba Odescalchi of Monteleone emigrated in Hungary in the early 19th c. and went extinct in 1924. Their titles were inherited by the Cech Erba Odescalchi family, extinct in 1979.

=== Odescalchi line ===
The titles of Livio Odescalchi (prince Odescalchi of the Holy Roman, Empire, Duke of Syrmia, Ceri and Bracciano) were confirmed in 1714 to Baldassare Erba, who took the name Odescalchi. His descendants settled in Rome as part of the highest rank of pontical nobility.

==== Roman Line ====
The Pope's grand-nephew Cardinal Benedetto Erba Odescalchi held a doctorate in Civil and Canon Law (Pavia, 1700), and was Papal Nuncio in Poland from 1712 to 1714. He was named Archbishop of Milan in 1712 (resigning in 1736 after a stroke), and was created a cardinal in January 1714. He died in Milan on 13 December 1740.

Carlo Odescalchi, S.J., was the son of Prince Baldassare Erba-Odescalchi, and Valeria Caterina Giustiniani. His family was in exile in Hungary during his youth, having fled the French forces of First Consul Bonaparte. He obtained a Doctorate in Civil and Canon Law. Pope Pius VII sent him on several minor diplomatic missions to Hungary. He became Auditor (Judge) of the Sacred Roman Rota in 1815, and joined the restored Society of Jesus in 1818. He was promoted Auditor of His Holiness and Canon of the Vatican Basilica. On 10 March 1823 Odescalchi was created a cardinal and named Archbishop of Ferrara; he resigned the diocese in 1826 to pursue a higher career in the Papal Curia as Prefect of the Congregation of Bishops and Regulars. He was named Bishop of Sabina in 1833; he resigned in 1838 to return to the Jesuits. He died in Modena in 1841.

The head of the family now is the representative of several noble titles, but none are recognized in Italy : Prince Odescalchi (papal nobility and nobility of the Holy Roman Empire), Duke of Syrmia (hungarian nobility with the former dignity of Magnate), prince of Bassano and Duke of Bracciano (italian nobility, formerly with the dignity of Grandee of Spain). The family owns the Palazzo Odescalchi in Rome and the Orsini-Odescalchi Castle in Bracciano, as well as large estates in Italy. The castle in Bracciano was originally an Orsini family fortress until it was sold to pay debts.

The family is currently represented by Carlo Odescalchi (b.1954), whose heir is his son Baldassare Odescalchi (b.1993).

==== Hungarian line ====
A junior member of the house, prince Augusto Odescalchi (1808-1848) settled in Hungary. His descendants were integrated in the Hungarian nobility. In the 20th century, Prince Karoly Odescalchi and his son, Prince Paul, were members of the Hungarian resistance to Nazism, as well as Communism.

== See also ==
- Castello Orsini-Odescalchi
- The Conversion of Saint Paul (Caravaggio)

== Sources ==
- Bianchi, Eugenia (2012). Gli Odescalchi a Como e Innocenzo XI : committenti, artisti, cantieri. Como : Nodo libri. (in Italian)
- Bucci, Ferdinando (2009). Il Castello Orsini-Odescalchi di Bracciano : storia, tesori e segreti. Manziana (Roma) : Vecchiarelli. (in Italian)
- Chisholm, Hugh, ed. (1911). "Odescalchi-Erba" . Encyclopædia Britannica. Vol. 20 (11th ed.). Cambridge University Press. p. 3.
- De Syrmia, Edmond (1978). At the head of nations : the rise of the papal and princely House of Odescalchi. Pleasant Valley, N.Y. : Cyclopedia Pub. Co.
- Mira, Giuseppe (1940). Vicende economiche di una famiglia italiana dal XIV al XVIII secolo (in Italian). Milan: Società editrice "Vita e pensiero,".
- Original 1922 Almanach de Gotha (edited by Justice Perthes) entry for the Odescalchi family
