= Paolo Giordano I Orsini =

Italian noble (1541–1585)

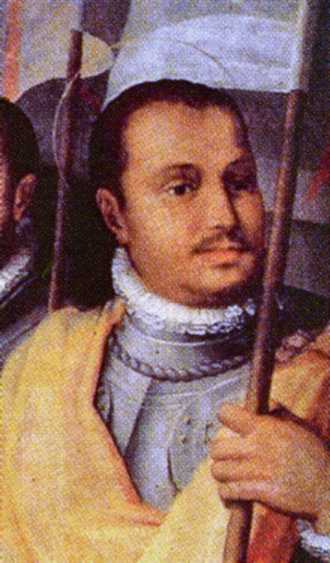
- Paolo Giordano Orsini in a group painting by Giovanni Maria Butteri, 1575

Duke of Bracciano
- Reign: 1560–13 November 1585
- Successor: Virginio Orsini, Duke of Bracciano
- Born: 1541
- Died: 13 November 1585 (aged 43–44)
- Noble family: Orsini
- Spouses: Isabella de' Medici (m. 1558; died 1576) Vittoria Accoramboni (m. 1585)
- Issue: by Isabella; Francesca Eleonora Orsini, Duchess of Segni; Virginio Orsini, Duke of Bracciano
- Father: Girolamo Orsini
- Mother: Francesca Sforza

Paolo Giordano Orsini (1541 – 13 November 1585) was an Italian nobleman, and the first duke of Bracciano from 1560. He was a member of the prominent Orsini family of Rome.

== Biography ==
The son of Girolamo Orsini and Francesca Sforza, he was grandson, on his father's side, of Felice della Rovere (illegitimate daughter of Pope Julius II) and Gian Giordano Orsini and, on his mother's side, of Count Bosio Sforza and Costanza Farnese, an illegitimate daughter of Pope Paul III.

On 3 September 1558 he married Isabella de' Medici, daughter of Cosimo I de' Medici, Grand Duke of Tuscany, at Poggio a Caiano. Paolo Giordano lived mostly in Rome and his castle at Bracciano, rather than with his wife, who stayed mostly at Florence. In 1571 he took part in the Battle of Lepanto. A year later, in October 1572, he served as a general of the Spanish infantry, in a campaign that tried to reclaim the garrison of Navarino in the Peloponnese. After enduring several miscarriages (in 1559, 1560, two in 1564 and the last in 1570), Isabella eventually gave birth to two children. On 1 March 1571, their daughter Francesca Eleonora Orsini was born, followed by their son Virginio Orsini in September 1572.

On 16 July 1576 his wife died unexpectedly at the Medici villa of Cerreto Guidi during a hunting holiday. According to her brother, Grand Duke Francesco I de' Medici, this occurred "while she was washing her hair in the morning ... She was found by Signor Paolo Giordano on her knees, having immediately fallen dead, but the Signor ensures that she had time to confess her soul to God." This official version of events was not generally believed, and the Ferrarese ambassador, Ercole Cortile, obtained information that Isabella was "strangled at midday" by her husband in the presence of several named servants.

Isabella was the second sudden death in an isolated country villa in the Medici family, her cousin Leonora having died of a similar "accident" only a few days before. Most historians assume that Paolo Giordano killed his wife, in reprisal for carrying on a love affair with his cousin Troilo Orsini, or that he acted on instructions of Isabella's brother, the grand duke.

Most historians assume that Paolo Giordano killed Isabella, in reprisal for carrying on a love affair with Troilo Orsini, and the evidence of the crime has been traced by the historian Caroline P. Murphy, in the correspondence between Ercole Cortile, Ferrarese ambassador, and Alfonso II d'Este, where there is mention of strangulation with the help of a "Massimo", knight of Malta who was a friend of the Orsini.

After these events, Paolo Giordano returned to Rome, where he started a relationship with Vittoria Accoramboni, wife of Francesco Peretti, the nephew of the future Pope Sixtus V. Peretti was assassinated, it was believed by Paolo Giordano's order, in April 1581. Wanted by both the Papal and Tuscan police, Paolo Giordano took refuge in northern Italy, first in Venice and then in Abano and Salò with his mistress, whom he married on 20 April 1585. He died at Salò on 13 November 1585.

On 22 December Vittoria was herself assassinated by Ludovico Orsini of the Monterotondo line, on the instigation of Grand Duke Francesco. The Medici (Francesco and Cardinal Ferdinando) wished to secure movable assets in possession of Vittoria for their nephew Virginio Orsini, Paolo Giordano's son from his first marriage and principal heir.

== Issue ==
By his first wife Isabella de' Medici, he had two children:

- Francesca Eleonora Orsini (1 March 1571 – 1634). She married Alessandro Sforza, Duke of Segni.
- Virginio Orsini (11 September 1572 – 9 September 1615). 2nd Duke of Bracciano. He married Flavia Peretti, niece of Pope Sixtus V.

== Ancestry ==
Ancestors of Paolo Giordano I Orsini

8. Virginio Orsini III, Lord of Bracciano
4. Gian Giordano Orsini
9. Isabella Orsini
2. Girolamo Orsini
10. Pope Julius II
5. Felice della Rovere
11. Lucrezia Normanni
1. Paolo Giordano I Orsini
6. Count Bosio Sforza
3. Francesca Sforza
14. Pope Paul III
7. Costanza Farnese
15. Silvia Ruffini

== In fiction ==
- Paolo Orsini credited as Brachiano is a main character in John Webster's 1612 play The White Devil
- Paolo Orsini credited as Paolo Giordano Orsini is a character in Robert Merle’s 1987 novel ‘’L’Idole’’

== Notes ==
| Preceded by New creation | Duke of Bracciano; 1560–1585 | Succeeded by Virginio Orsini |
