= The White Devil =

1612 tragedy by John Webster

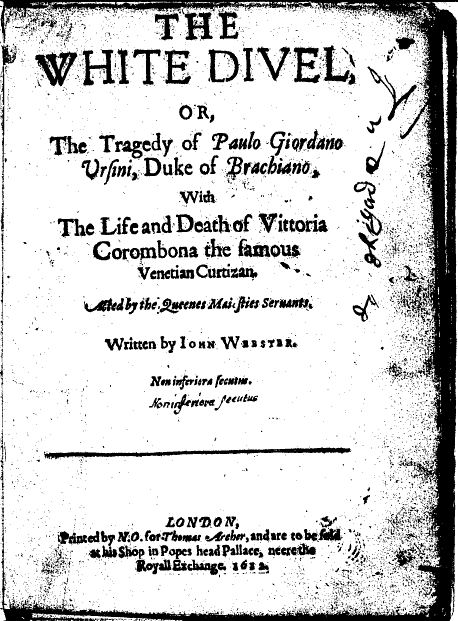
- Title page of the 1612 edition of The White Devil
- Original title: The White Divel; or, The Tragedy of Paulo Giordano Ursini, Duke of Brachiano. With The Life and Death of Vittoria Corombona the famous Venetian Curtizan
- Original language: Early Modern English
- Written by: John Webster
- Based on: Reports of the 1585 murder of Vittoria Accoramboni
- Characters: Monticelso; Francisco De Medici – Duke of Florence; Brachiano; Vittoria Corombona
- Genre: Revenge tragedy
- Setting: Padua and Rome, 1585

Premiere
- Date: 1612
- Place: Red Bull Theatre, Clerkenwell

The White Devil (Note: Full original title: The White Divel; or, The Tragedy of Paulo Giordano Ursini, Duke of Brachiano. With The Life and Death of Vittoria Corombona the famous Venetian Curtizan) is a tragedy by the English playwright John Webster. According to Webster's own preface to the 1612 Quarto Edition, the play's first performance in that year was a notorious failure; he complained that the play was acted in the dead of winter before an unreceptive audience. The play's complexity, sophistication, and satire made it a poor fit with the repertory of Queen Anne's Men at the Red Bull Theatre, where it was first performed. It was successfully revived in 1630 by Queen Henrietta's Men at the Cockpit Theatre and published again in 1631.

== Background ==
The story is loosely based on an event in Italy twenty-seven years prior to the play's composition: the murder of Vittoria Accoramboni in Padua on 22 December 1585. Webster's dramatisation of this event turned Italian corruption into a vehicle for depicting "the political and moral state of England in his own day", particularly the corruption in the royal court.

The play explores the differences between the reality of people and the way they depict themselves as good, "white", or pure.

== Characters ==
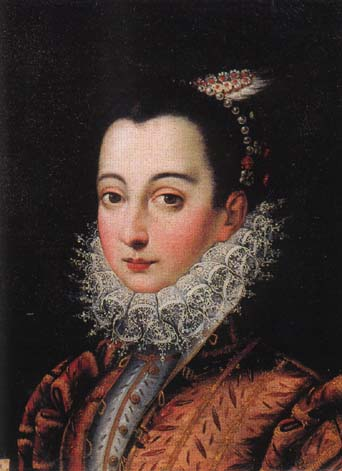
Portrait of Vittoria Accoramboni by Scipione Pulzone (16th century); her murder inspired The White Devil.

- Monticelso – a cardinal, later Pope Paul IV.
- Francisco De Medici – Duke of Florence; in Act V disguised as the Moor "Mulinassar".
- Brachiano – otherwise Paulo Giordano Orsini, The Duke of Brachiano, husband of Isabella, and in love with Vittoria.
- Giovanni – Brachiano's son by Isabella.
- Lodovico – sometimes Lodowick, an Italian count in love with Isabella.
- Antonelli – Ludovico's friend and conspirator.
- Gasparo – Ludovico's friend and conspirator.
- Camillo – Vittoria's husband, nephew of Monticelso.
- Carlo – attendant of Brachiano, in league with Francisco.
- Pedro – attendant of Brachiano, in league with Francisco.
- Hortensio – one of Brachiano's officers.
- Marcello – an attendant to the Duke of Florence; Vittoria's younger brother.
- Flamineo – Vittoria's brother. Brachiano's secretary.
- Isabella – Francisco De Medici's sister; first wife of Brachiano
- Vittoria Corombona – a Venetian lady, sister of Flamineo. first married to Camillo – afterwards to Brachiano. Based on Vittoria Accoramboni.
- Cornelia – mother of Vittoria, Flamineo, and Marcello.
- Zanche – Moor servant to Vittoria; in love with Flamineo, then Francisco.
- Ambassadors, courtiers, lawyers, officers, physicians, conjurer, armourer, attendants, matron of the House of Convertites, ladies.
- Doctor Julio.
- Christophero – one of the line-less "ghost" characters, who helps Doctor Julio murder Isabella.

== Sources ==
Webster based The White Devil on newsletter versions of the story of the killing of Vittoria Accoramboni, while structuring the story on the basis of Democritean and Epicurean philosophy.

The newsletters detailed how Vittoria, of a proud but poor family, married the nephew of Cardinal Montalto, who later became Pope Sixtus V. In 1580, she met Paolo Giordano Orsini, Duke of Bracciano, previously married to Isabella Medici of the famous Medici family. Upon meeting Vittoria, the Duke fell desperately in love with her and arranged for the Cardinal's nephew to be killed in order that he might secretly marry Vittoria. Pope Gregory soon found out and ordered Vittoria and the Duke to part and even resorted to having Vittoria imprisoned in the Castel Sant'Angelo under the suspicion of having killed her husband. In 1585 a new pope was elected and amid the confusion of change Vittoria and Bracciano married and left Rome. In the play the Pope is misnamed Paul IV (he was in fact Sixtus V, formerly Cardinal Montalto, Paul IV having died in 1559). Eight months later the Duke died and the Medici family, wishing to protect their family interests, challenged his will, which placed Vittoria to be in charge of his fortune. When Vittoria refused to co-operate, according to the play, the Medicis arranged for her to be killed. She was stabbed to death in Padua by Ludovico Orsini, a relative of her second husband.

== Plot summary ==
Count Lodovico is banished from Rome for debauchery and murder; his friends, Gasparo and Antonelli promise to work for the repeal of his sentence. The Duke of Brachiano has conceived a violent passion for Vittoria Corombona, daughter of a noble but impoverished Venetian family, despite the fact they are both married to other people. Vittoria's brother Flamineo, employed as a secretary to Brachiano, has been scheming to bring his sister and the Duke together in the hope of advancing his career, much to the dismay of their mother, Cornelia. The plan is foiled by the arrival of Brachiano's wife Isabella, escorted by her brother and Cardinal Monticelso. They are both outraged by the rumours of Brachiano's infidelity and set out to make the affair public; before that happens Brachiano and Flamineo arrange to have Camillo (Vittoria's husband) and Isabella murdered.

Vittoria is put on trial for the murder of her husband and although there is no real evidence against her, she is condemned by the Cardinal to imprisonment in a convent for penitent whores. Flamineo pretends madness to protect himself from awkward suggestions. The banished Count Lodovico is pardoned and returns to Rome; confessing he had been secretly in love with Isabella, he vows to avenge her death. Isabella's brother Francisco also plots revenge. He pens a love letter to Vittoria, intentionally allowing it to fall into the hands of Brachiano, in order to fuel his jealousy. Though at first his plan seems to work, Vittoria manages to convince Brachiano that she is faithful and the two elope. Cardinal Monticelso is elected Pope and as his first act he excommunicates Vittoria and Brachiano, who have fled Rome.

Vittoria and Brachiano, now married, hold court in Padua. Three mysterious strangers have arrived to enter Brachiano's service. These are Francisco, disguised as Mulinassar (a Moor), Lodovico and Gasparo (disguised as Capuchin monks), all conspiring to avenge Isabella's death. They begin their revenge by poisoning Brachiano. As he is dying, Lodovico and Gasparo reveal themselves to him, strangling him when he tries to raise the alarm. Next, Zanche, Vittoria's Moorish maid, who has fallen in love with her supposed countryman Mulinassar, reveals to him the murders of Isabella and Camillo and Flamineo's part in them.

Flamineo is banished from court for the murder of his brother Marcello by Brachiano's son Giovanni, the new Duke, and sensing that his crimes are catching up with him he goes to see Vittoria. He tries to persuade her and Zanche to a triple suicide by shooting him, then themselves. Vittoria and Zanche shoot Flamineo and, thinking him dead, exult in his death and their escape. Much to their surprise, Flamineo rises from the 'dead' and reveals to them the pistols were not loaded. As he tries to exact his own revenge on Vittoria, Lodovico and Gasparo enter and complete their revenge by killing all three. Giovanni and officers then arrive and the play ends with Giovanni learning of his uncle's participation in the bloody acts and arresting Lodovico and vowing that "All that have hands in this shall taste our justice" (5.6.297).

== Productions ==
The play was written for and first performed by Queen Anne's Men at the Red Bull Theatre in Clerkenwell in the early months of 1612. The troupe usually offered simpler and more optimistic plays of the type written by their dramatist, Thomas Heywood. The play staged before Webster's seems to have been If This Be Not a Good Play, a tragicomedy by Thomas Dekker. Webster's play failed at its debut. In the prefatory epistle to the quarto, Webster praised the actors, mentioning Richard Perkins; but complained of the winter weather and above all of the audience, whose intellect he compared to that of donkeys.

The first successful modern production was that of the Marlowe Society (ADC Theatre, Cambridge, March 1920), with music by C. Armstrong Gibbs and with Eric Maschwitz as Vittoria. The Society specialised in Elizabethan and Jacobean revivals in uncut texts performed with their original economy and rapidity, and with the female roles played by men. "Anybody who enjoys hearing beautiful poetry beautifully spoken" wrote the editor of the Cambridge Review, "and tragic passion 'with dignity put on' should not miss this wonderful opportunity. What a magnificent play!" "After three hundred years it must console the poet in his Elysium to know that at last his play has been played with success before a 'full and understanding auditory'. We must confess that to us it was the ritual of an initiation to the mysteries of a play which we always believed to be great, but which we never realised was quite so wonderful". The production inspired the Cambridge scholar F. L. Lucas to edit the complete plays of Webster. "But in what exactly does the fascination of Webster consist?" he asked in the New Statesman. "What could make the Cambridge production of The White Devil in 1920 seem still, to at least two who saw it then without any preconceptions, the most staggering performance they had ever known?"

In 1925 the Renaissance Theatre mounted a heavily cut version featuring Viola Tree and Cedric Hardwicke. The production was not well reviewed, perhaps mainly because of a failure to understand the special requirements of Renaissance dramaturgy. Webster scholar F. L. Lucas asked in the New Statesman, "Who can hope to speak passionate verse lying on one elbow on the floor?"

A London production in 1947 at the Duchess Theatre directed by Michael Benthall featured Hugh Griffith as Monticelso, Patrick Macnee as Hortensio/Spanish Ambassador, Claire Bloom as one of the Ladies of Brachiano's court, Margaret Rawlings as Vittoria and Andrew Cruickshank as the Duke of Florence.

In 1965, an Off-Broadway production was staged at the Circle in the Square starring Frank Langella as Flamineo, Carrie Nye as Vittoria, Paul Stevens as Brachiano, Robert Burr as Francisco, Eric Berry as Monticelso and Christina Pickles as Cornelia. The production ran from 6 December 1965 to 17 April 1966 and won the Obie Award for Distinguished Performance (Frank Langella).

In November 1969, the National Theatre at the Old Vic in London, performed the play in a production by Frank Dunlop (who went on to found the Young Vic). The cast was largely drawn from the company. Geraldine McEwan played Vittoria, Edward Woodward Flamineo, Edward Petherbridge Lodovico, Benjamin Whitrow Camillo, Derek Godfrey Bracciano, Jane Lapotaire Zanche, Hazel Hughes Cornelia, John Moffatt Monticelso, Jane Wenham Isabella, Anthony Nicholls Francisco and Edward Hardwicke Marcello. In later performances Derek Jacobi played Lodovico. It was designed by Piero Gherardi as a crumbling wall out of which characters emerged like crawling insects in fantastic costumes of great extravagance. William Hobbs staged the fights and played the Spanish Ambassador. Mime work was by Claude Chagrin. The assistant director was Roland Joffe (since then the director of "The Killing Fields" and "The Mission").

The Royal Shakespeare Company performed The White Devil in 1996 at the Swan Theatre in Stratford-upon-Avon (later transferred to London to The Pit at The Barbican), directed by Gale Edwards with Richard McCabe as Flamineo, Philip Quast as Ludovico, Ray Fearon as Brachiano, Jane Gurnett as Vittoria, Stephen Boxer as Francisco and Philip Voss. The company returned to the play in 2014 with a production in the Swan Theatre in Stratford-upon-Avon, directed by Maria Aberg with David Sturzaker as Bracciano, Kirsty Bushell as Vittoria, David Rintoul as Cardinal Monticelso, Simon Scardifield as Francisco and Joseph Arkley as Ludovico; in this production, Flamineo, Vittoria's brother, was played by a woman (Laura Elphinstone).

On 1 March 1997, the BBC World Service broadcast an adaptation starring Anton Lesser and Helen Baxendale.

On 15 August 2010 BBC Radio 3 broadcast a production adapted and directed by Marc Beeby which, according to the BBC Radio 3 web site, "sets the action in a murky underworld of the 1950s – a world that seeks to hide its shifting alliances, betrayals and sudden violence beneath a flaky veneer of honour and respectability." The production featured Patrick Kennedy as Flamineo, Anna Maxwell Martin as Vittoria, Frances de la Tour as Cornelia, Shaun Dingwall as Brachiano, Peter Wright as Francisco, Sean Baker as Monticelso and Harry Myers as Ludovico.

On 26 January 2017 a run started at the Sam Wanamaker Playhouse, London (a venue embodying the features of a typical theatre from the period of the original seventeenth century production).

The Red Bull Theatre in New York performed The White Devil in 2019.

To date, this play has never been filmed or televised.

== Adaptations ==
In 1707, Nahum Tate's adaptation of the play, titled Injur'd Love: or the Cruel Husband, was published.
