= Orsini family =

Italian noble family

Orsini
- Black noble family
- Original arms of the family
- Parent family: Bobone/Orsini
- Country: Papal States; Kingdom of Naples; County palatine of Cephalonia and Zakynthos; Despotate of Epirus; Grand Duchy of Tuscany; Two Sicilies; Kingdom of Italy
- Current region: Italy
- Founded: c. A.D. 0600; 1426 years ago
- Founder: Cajo Orso Orsini
- Current head: Domenico Napoleone Orsini, Duke of Gravina
- Titles: Pope (non-hereditary); Prince of the Holy Roman Empire; Despot of Epirus; Count palatine of Cephalonia and Zakynthos; Prince Assistant to the Papal Throne; Duke of Bari; Duke of Gravina; Duke of Amalfi; Duke of Bracciano; Count of Pitigliano
- Motto: Senza rimproveri (Italian for 'Without reproach')

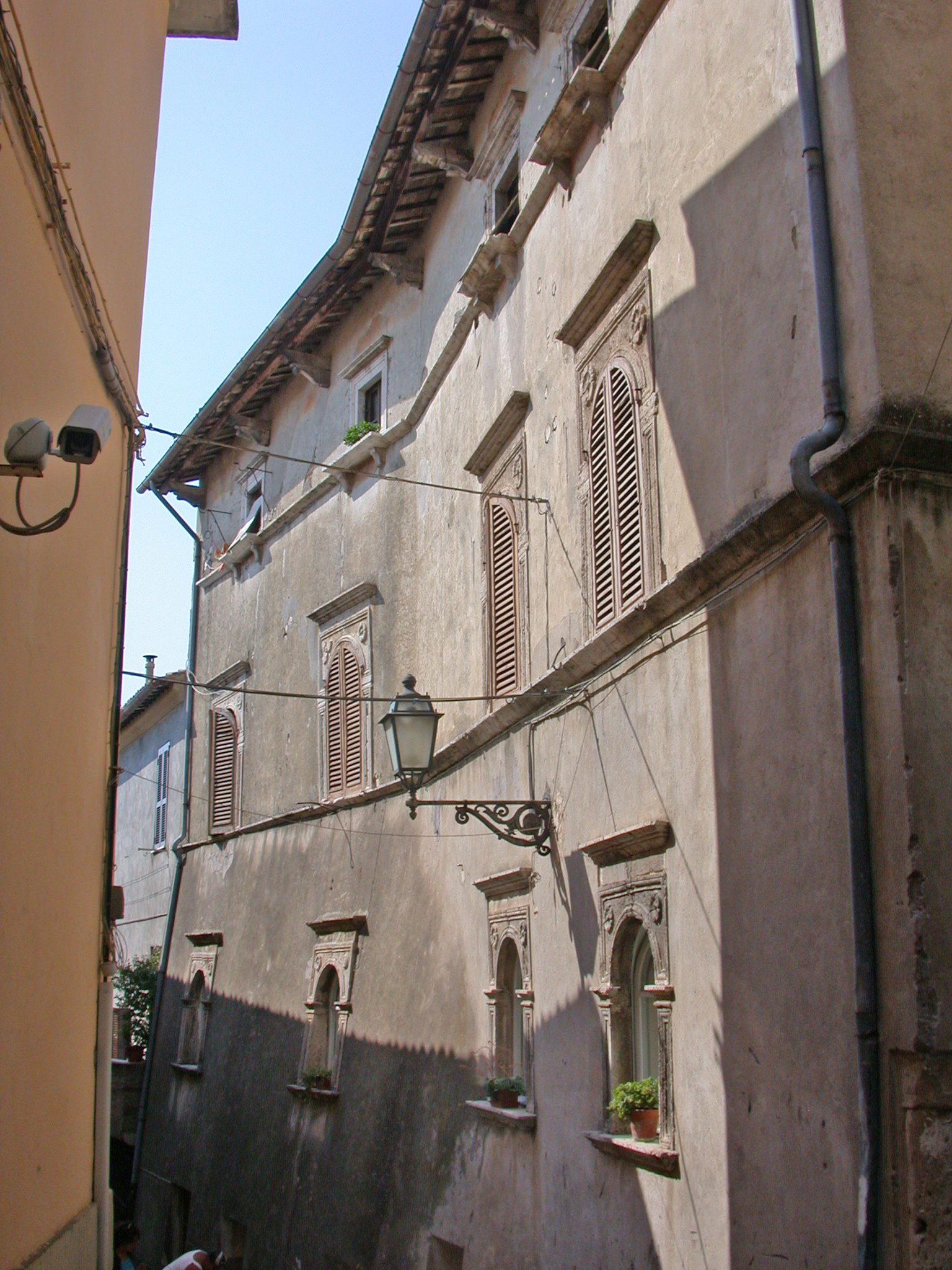
Palazzo Orsini in Fara Sabina, northern Lazio, Central Italy. The Orsini were amongst the main feudatories in Italy from the Middle Ages onwards, holding a great number of fiefs and lordships in Lazio and in the Kingdom of Naples.

The House of Orsini is an Italian noble family that was one of the most influential princely families in Medieval Italy and Renaissance Rome. Members of the Orsini family include five popes: Stephen II (752–757), Paul I (757–767), Celestine III (1191–1198), Nicholas III (1277–1280), and Benedict XIII (1724–1730). The family also included 34 cardinals, numerous condottieri, and other significant political and religious figures. The Orsini are part of the Black nobility who were Roman aristocratic families who supported the Popes in the governance of the Papal States.

== Origins ==
According to their own family legend, the Orsini are descended from the Julio-Claudian dynasty of ancient Rome. They attribute their origin to an individual named Ursus, who served as count of Tivoli, probably in the 9th century. The Orsini carried on a political feud with the Colonna family for centuries in Rome, until it was stopped by Papal Bull in 1511. In 1571, the heads of both families married nieces of Pope Sixtus V as an act of reconciliation.

The Orsini descend from Cajo Orso Orsini, who lived c. AD 600. Five popes are descended from him: Stephen II, Paul I, Celestine III, Nicholas III and Benedict XIII. Some members used the surname of Bobone-Orsini. One member by the name Bobone, lived during the early 11th century, father of Pietro, who was in turn father of Giacinto Bobone (1110–1198), who in 1191 became pope as Celestine III. One of the first great nepotist popes, he made two of his nephews cardinals and allowed his cousin Giovanni Gaetano (Giangaetano, died 1232) to buy the fiefs of Vicovaro, Licenza, Roccagiovine and Nettuno, which formed the nucleus of the future territorial power of the family.

The Bobone surname was lost with his children, who were called de domo filiorum Ursi. Two of them, Napoleone and Matteo Rosso the Great (1178–1246), considerably increased the prestige of the family. The former was the founder of the first southern line, which died out with Camillo Pardo in 1553. He obtained the city of Manoppello, later a countship, and was gonfaloniere of the Papal States. Matteo Rosso, called the Great, was the effective lord of Rome from 1241, when he defeated the Imperial troops, until 1243, holding the title of Senator. Two of his sons, and Napoleone, were also Senators. Matteo ousted the family's traditional rivals, the Colonna family, from Rome and extended the Orsini territories southwards down to Avellino and northwards to Pitigliano. During his life, the family was firmly in the Guelph faction. He had some ten sons, who divided the fiefs after his deaths: Gentile (died 1246) originated the Pitigliano line and the second southern line, Rinaldo that of Monterotondo, Napoleone (died 1267) that of Bracciano, and another Matteo Rosso that of Montegiordano, from the name of the district in Rome housing the family's fortress. The most distinguished of his sons was Giovanni Gaetano (died 1280): elected pope as Nicholas III, he named his nephew Bertoldo (d. 1289) as count of Romagna, and had two nephews and a brother created cardinals.

== The second southern line ==
The rise of the Orsini did not stop after Nicholas' death. Bertoldo's son, Gentile II (1250–1318), was two times Senator of Rome, podestà of Viterbo and, from 1314, Gran Giustiziere ("Great Justicer") of the Kingdom of Naples. He married Clarice Ruffo, daughter of the counts of Catanzaro, forming an alliance of the most powerful Calabrian dynasty. His son Romano (1268–1327), called Romanello, was Royal Vicar of Rome in 1326, and inherited the countship of Soana through his marriage with Anastasia de Montfort, Countess of Nola. Romano's stance was markedly Guelph. After his death, his two sons divided his fiefs, forming the Pitigliano and the second southern line.

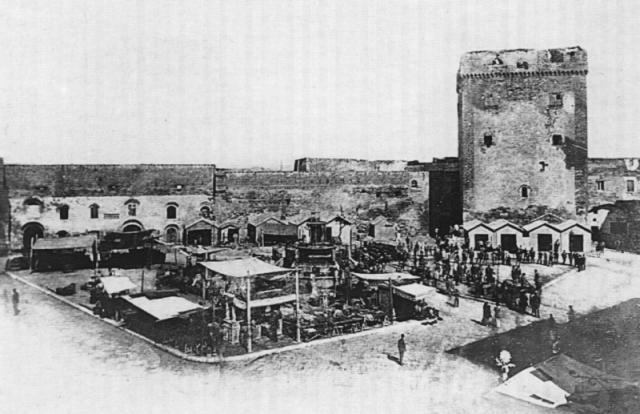
The Tower of Raimondello Orsini in Taranto, c. 1880.

Roberto (1295–1345), Gentile II's grandson, married Sibilla del Balzo, daughter of the Great Senechal of the Kingdom of Naples. Among his sons, Giacomo (died 13 August 1379; Dean of Salisbury, Archdeacon of Leicester and Archdeacon of Durham) was created cardinal by Gregory XI in 1371, while Nicola (August 27, 1331 – February 14, 1399) obtained the counties of Ariano and Celano. The latter was also Senator of Rome and enlarged the family territories in Lazio and Tuscany.

His second son, Raimondello Orsini del Balzo, supported Charles III' coup d'état in Naples against Queen Joan I. Under king Ladislaus he was among the few Neapolitan feudataries who were able to maintain their territorial power after the royal war against them. However, at his death in 1406 the southern Orsini fiefs were confiscated. Relationships with the royal family remained cold under Joan II; However, when Raimondello's son Giannantonio (1386–1453) sent his troops to help her against the usurpation attempt of James of Bourbon, he received in exchange the Principality of Taranto.

The links with the court increased further under Sergianni Caracciolo, Joan's lover and Great Senechal. A younger brother of Giannantonio married one of Sergianni's daughters. However, the Orsini changed side when Alfonso V of Aragon started his conquest of the Kingdom of Naples. Giannantonio was awarded with the duchy of Bari, the position of Great Connestable and an appanage of 100,000 ducati. Giannantonio remained faithful to Alfonso's heir, Ferdinand I, but was killed during a revolt of nobles. Having died without legitimate sons, much of his possessions were absorbed into the Royal Chamber.

== Pitigliano line ==
This line was initiated by Guido Orsini, second son of Romano, who inherited the county of Soana, on the western side of Lake Bolsena in southern Tuscany. He and his descendants ruled over the fiefs of Soana, Pitigliano and Nola, but in the early 15th century wars against the Republic of Siena and the Colonnas caused the loss of several territories. Bertoldo (died 1417) managed to keep only Pitigliano, while his grandson Orso (died July 5, 1479) was count of Nola and fought as condottiere under the Duke of Milan and the Republic of Venice. Later he entered the service of Ferdinand I of Naples, but, not having taken part in the Barons' conspiracy, he was rewarded with the fiefs of Ascoli and Atripalda. He took part in the Aragonese campaign in Tuscany and was killed at the siege of Viterbo.

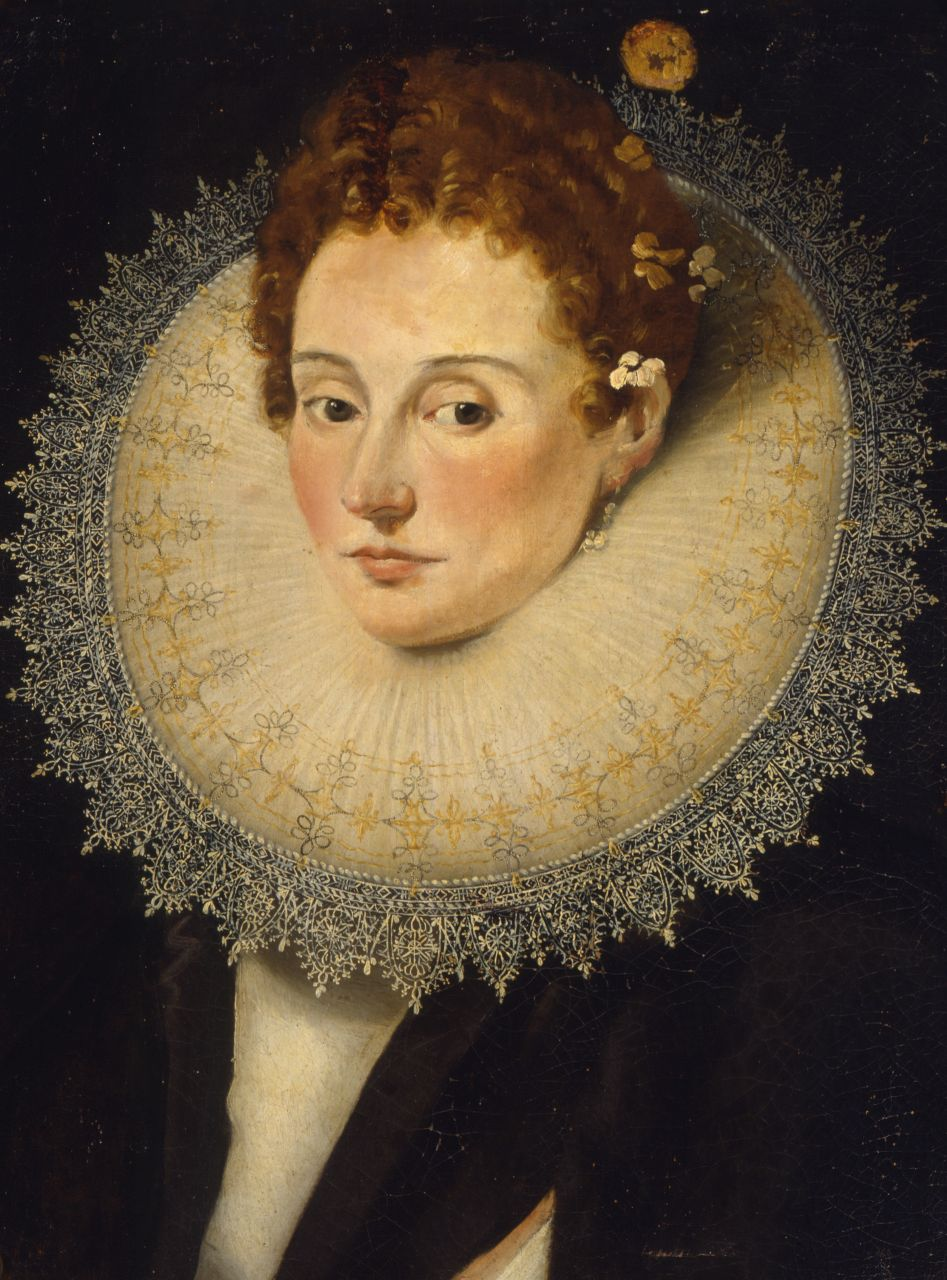
Gerolama Orsini, Pier Luigi's wife.

The most outstanding member of the Pitigliano line was Niccolò, one of the major condottiere of the time. His son Ludovico (died January 27, 1534) and his nephew Enrico (died 1528) participated in the Italian Wars at the service of both France and Spain, often changing side with the typical ease of the Italian military leaders of the time. Two of Ludovico's daughters married relevant figures: Geronima to Pier Luigi Farnese, illegitimate son of Pope Paul III and Marzia to Gian Giacomo Medici of Marignano, an important general of the Spanish army.

The line started to decay after the loss of Nola by Ludovico, who was also forced to accept the Sienese suzerainty over Pitigliano. Under his son Giovan Francesco (died May 8, 1567) the county entered the orbit of the Grand Duke of Tuscany. Later, the attempt of Alessandro (died February 9, 1604) to obtain the title of Monterotondo was thwarted by Pope Gregory XIII. His son Giannantonio (March 25, 1569 – 1613) sold Pitigliano to Tuscany, in exchange for the marquisate of Monte San Savino.

The line became extinct in 1640 with the death of Alessandro.

== Monterotondo line ==
This line was founded by Rinaldo, third son of Matteo Rosso the Great. His son, Napoleone, became a cardinal in 1288 and remained a prominent member of the Curia until his death at Avignon in 1342.

This branch of the family was often involved in the baronial struggles of the Late Middle Ages Rome, at least three members of the family being elected as Senators, while others fought as condottieri. Francesco in 1370 took part to the war of Florence against the Visconti of Milan. Orso (died July 24, 1424) died fighting for the king of Naples in the Battle of Zagonara against the Milanese. His sons Giacomo (died 1482) and Lorenzo (1452) battled for the Papal States, Naples and Florence. One of Giacomo's daughters, Clarice (1453–July 30, 1488) became Lorenzo de' Medici's wife. Franciotto Orsini was created cardinal by Leo X in 1517.

The most important member of the Monterotondo Orsinis was Giovani Battista Orsini, who became cardinal under Sixtus IV (1483). He was probably among the promoters of the failed plot against Cesare Borgia in 1502, being assassinated on February 22 of 1503 as retaliation, together with other members of the family: Giulio survived captivity under Cesare, but Paolo and Francesco 4th Duke of Gravina were strangled to death on 18 January 1503.

The line decayed from the late 16th century, when several members were assassinated or lost their lands for various reasons. Its last representatives Enrico (died September 12, 1643) and Francesco (1592 - September 21, 1650) sold Monterotondo to the Barberini in 1641.

== Bracciano line ==
Napoleone, another son of Matteo Rosso the Great, received Bracciano, Nerola and other lands in what is now northern Lazio. In 1259 he was Senator of Rome. Thanks to the strategic positions of their fiefs, and to their famous castle built in Bracciano in 1426, they were the most powerful Orsini line in the Lazio. Count Carlo (died after 1485), son of another Napoleone (died October 3, 1480), was Papal Gonfaloniere. By his marriage with a Francesca Orsini of Monterotondo was born Gentile Virginio Orsini, one of the most prominent figures of Italian politics in the late 15th century. After Carlo's death, he enlarged the family's tenure with lands inherited by his wife, another Orsini from Salerno, and most of all he was amongst the favourites of Ferdinand I of Naples, who appointed him as Great Constable of Naples. Together with his cousin, the Cardinal Giovanni Battista, he was among the fiercest opponents of popes Innocent VIII and Alexander VI. In 1492 Gentile Virginio bought the county of Anguillara from Franceschetto Cybo.

During Charles VIII of France's descent into Italy, he managed to keep Bracciano. Ferdinand II had his fiefs confiscated and imprisoned him in Castel dell'Ovo, where he was poisoned in 1497. The family recovered this setback under the more friendly Medici popes of the early 16th century. His son Gian Giordano was Prince Assistant to the Papal Throne. His nephew Virginio was a famous admiral for the Papal States and France, but in 1539 he had his fiefs confiscated under the charge of treason.

Paolo Giordano was created first Duke of Bracciano in 1560. The son of Girolamo Orsini and Francesca Sforza, he was grandson, on his father's side, of Felice della Rovere (illegitimate daughter of Pope Julius II) and Gian Giordano Orsini and, on his mother's side, of Count Bosio Sforza and Costanza Farnese, an illegitimate daughter of Pope Paul III. An accomplished condottiero, he was however also a ruthless figure who had his wife Isabella de' Medici murdered. For this and other homicides he had to flee to northern Italy. He was succeeded by Virginio, whose heir Paolo Giordano II married the princess of Piombino and was created Prince of the Holy Roman Empire. His brother Alessandro was cardinal and Papal legate, and another brother, Ferdinando (died March 4, 1660) acquired the assets of the other line of San Gemini. In the 17th century the Dukes of Bracciano moved their residence to Rome. This, along with a general economical decadence, damaged the dukedom, and last Duke and Prince, Flavio (March 4, 1620 – April 5, 1698) was forced by the huge debts to sell it to Livio Odescalchi.

== Gravina line ==
Princely arms of the Gravina line

The line of Gravina, from the name of the eponymous city in Apulia, is the only existing line of the Orsini. It descends from Francesco (died 1456), a son of Count Carlo of Bracciano. Most of his fief was located in northern Lazio, but he entered in the Neapolitan orbit when in 1418 he was called by Sergianni Caracciolo to fight against the Angevine troops, which he defeated. By marriage, he obtained the title of Count of Gravina. He was made Duke of Gravina by King Alfonso, a title definitely assigned to his son Giacomo (died 1472), to which had been added the counties of Conversano, Campagna and Copertino. Two of Francesco's sons, Marino (died 1471) and Giovanni Battista (died June 8, 1476), were respectively archbishop of Taranto and Grand Master of the Knights of Rhodes.

The fourth duke, Francesco, was part of a conspiracy along with his brothers Giulio and Paolo against Cesare Borgia but were found out, and Francesco was strangled to death on 18 January 1503 along with his brother Paolo. One of Francesco's nephews, Flavio Orsini, was created cardinal in 1565. The fifth duke, Ferdinando (died December 6, 1549), had all his fiefs confiscated by the Spaniards, but he regained them after a 40,000 scudi payment.

After the heirless death of Duke Michele Antonio (January 26, 1627), his lands passed to his cousin Pietro Orsini, count of Muro Lucano (died 1641). The latter's nephew Pier Francesco, who had renounced the succession in favour of his brother Domenico to become a Dominican, was later elected pope with the name of Benedict XIII.

His successor raised Benedict XIII's nephew, Prince Beroaldo Orsini, to the dignity of Prince Assistants to the Papal Throne (title held until 1958), after the emperor Charles VI had already, in 1724, made him a prince of the Holy Roman Empire. The last cardinal from the family was Domenico.

This branch of the family moved to Rome in the 18th century, where Duke Domenico (November 23, 1790 – April 28, 1874), married Maria Luisa Torlonia in 1823. In 1850, he was Minister of War and General Lieutenant of the Papal Armies, and also Senator of Rome.

The remaining princely family is represented by Prince Domenico Napoleone Orsini, Duke of Gravina (b. 1948). With no sons or male-line descendants, the heir to the dukedom of Gravina is his brother Don Benedetto Orsini (b. 1956), followed by his cousin Prince Lelio Orsini d'Aragona (b. 1981), whose mother is Princess Ketevan Bagration of Mukhrani.

== Notable members ==
=== Orsini popes ===
- Pope Celestine III (Giacinto Bobone, created cardinal in 1144)
- Pope Nicholas III (Giovanni Gaetano Orsini, created cardinal in 1244)
- Pope Benedict XIII (Pietro Francesco Orsini, created cardinal in 1672)

=== Orsini cardinals ===
- Pietro Orsini (1181)
- Matteo Rubeo Orsini (1262)
- Latino Malabranca Orsini O.P. (1278)
- Giordano Orsini (1278)
- Napoleone Orsini (1288)
- Francesco Napoleone Orsini (1295)
- Matteo Orsini O.P. (1327)
- Rinaldo Orsini (1350)
- Giacomo Orsini (1371)
- Poncello Orsini (1378)
- Tommaso Orsini (1382/1385)
- Giordano Orsini (1405)
- Latino di Carlo Orsini (1448)
- Cosma Orsini O.S.B. (1480)
- Giovanni Battista Orsini (1483)
- Franciotto Orsini (1517)
- Flavio Orsini (1565)
- Alessandro Orsini (1615)
- Virginio Orsini (1641)
- Domenico Orsini d'Aragona (1743)

=== Others ===
- Clarice Orsini (1453–1488), spouse of Lorenzo il Magnifico
- Fabio Orsini (1476–1504)
- Gerolama Orsini, (1503–1570), noble
- Giovanni II Orsini, Count of Cefalonia and Zante, despota dell'Epiro 1323–1335
- Giovanni Antonio del Balzo Orsini, (1386 or 1393–1463), noble of the Kingdom of Naples, prince of Taranto, count of Lecce and duke Bari.
- Giovanni Battista Orsini (d. 1476), Grand Master of the Order of Malta from 1467 to 1476
- Pietro Gianpaolo Orsini (d. 1443), condottiero.
- Latino di Camillo Orsini (c. 1530 – c. 1580), condottiero.
- Mondilio Orsini (1690–1751), archbishop of Capua from 1728 to 1743, grand-nephew of pope Benedict XIII
- Napoleone Orsini (1420–1480), condottiero
- Niceforo II Orsini (1329–1359), condottiero e despota dell'Epiro
- Paolo Giordano I Orsini (1541–1585), duke of Bracciano dal 1560
- Pierfrancesco II Vicino Orsini (1523–1585), duke of Bomarzo
- Raimondo del Balzo Orsini, (1361–1406), noble of the Kingdom of Naples
- Rinaldo Orsini, archbishop of Florence from 1474 to 1508
- Rinaldo Orsini (1402–1450), condottiero and Lord of Piombino
- Tommaso Orsini (died 1576), Bishop of Foligno and Strongoli
- Virginio Orsini (1572–1615), duke of Bracciano
- Filippo Orsini (1920–1984), duke of Gravina, Prince Assistant to the Papal Throne (Lat. Stator proximus a Solio Pontificis maximi) (1950–1958)
- Benedetto Orsini (b. 1956), prince of Vallata, Cavaliere di Giustizia del Sacro Militare Ordine Costantiniano di San Giorgio
- Domenico Napoleone Orsini (b. 1948), duke of Gravina

== Notable buildings ==
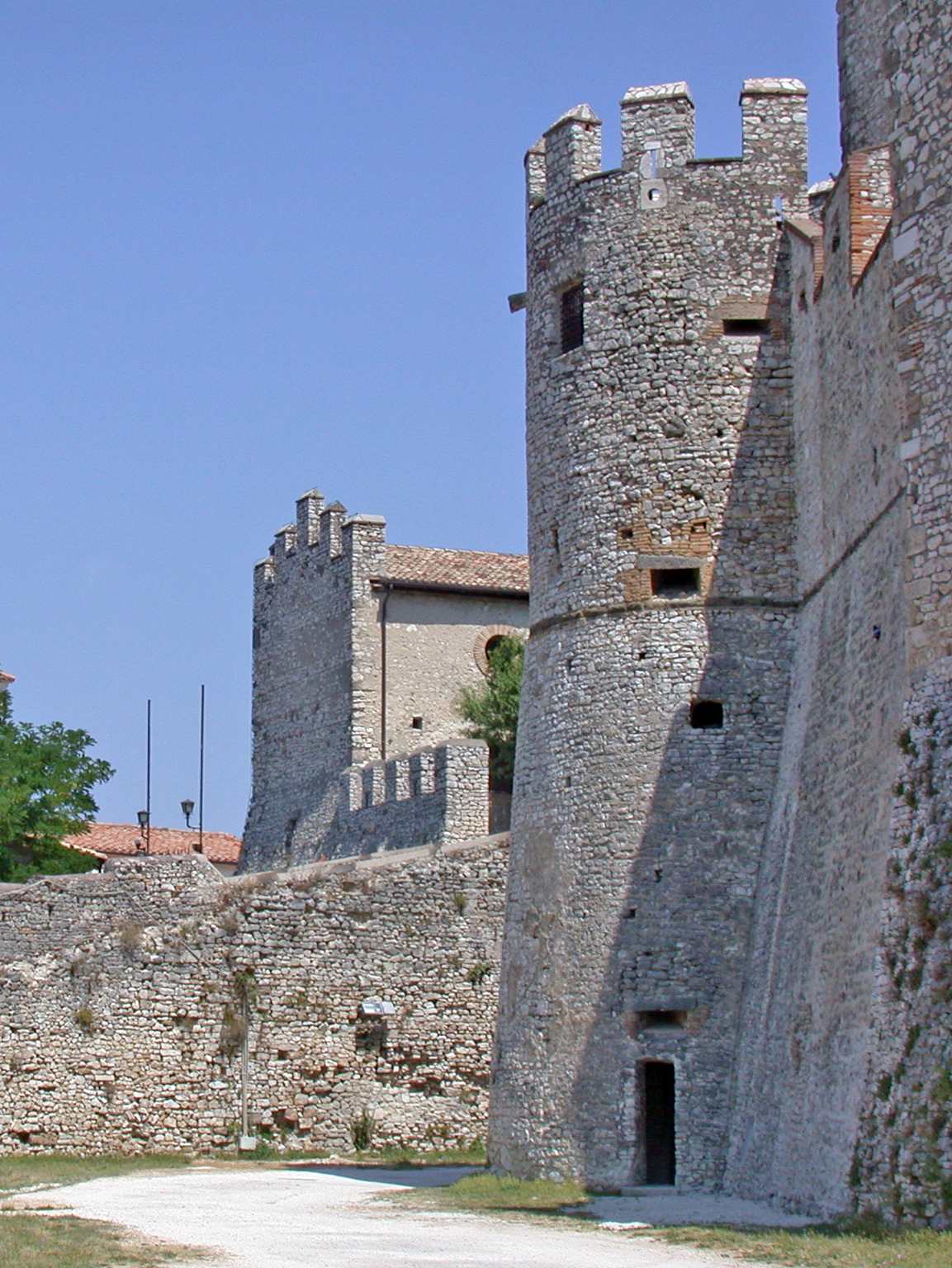
The Orsini Castle in Nerola.

Apart from the Bracciano castle, other notable buildings and structures associated with the Orsini include:

- The so-called Park of the Monsters just outside the city of Bomarzo is a Late Renaissance manieristic garden gallery of sculptures and architecture commissioned in the 16th century by Vicino Orsini. It includes also a palace, designed by Baldassarre Peruzzi, begun in 1525 by Gian Corrado Orsini and finished by his son Vicino.
- The Orsini Palace in Rome, including the Theatre of Marcellus.
- Palazzo Orsini Pio Righetti, also in Rome.
- Orsini Castles in:
  - Avezzano
  - Nerola
  - Pitigliano
  - Sant'Angelo Romano (15th century)
  - Sorano
  - Soriano nel Cimino (built by Nicholas III in 1278)
  - Vasanello (12th century)

== Orsinis in literature ==
The Orsini family was briefly mentioned in Boccaccio's book The Decameron in the 5th day, 3rd story. In the woods, it is described that soldiers from a rival family's soldiers attacked a fictional character in the book named Pietro while they had become lost in the woods about eight miles from Rome. Boccaccio describes the soldiers acting to spite of the Orsini's. Furthermore, a castle named Campo de' Fiori, was included in the text. L'Idole (R. Merle) also has Paolo and Lodovico Orsini as main protagonists, since the book is about Vittoria Accoramboni's life.

A "Princess Orsini" is mentioned in Book II, Chapter XXII of F. Scott Fitzgerald's Tender is the Night, as Dick Diver relates an anecdote to Collis Clay in the bar of Rome's Quirinal Hotel.

An adventurer and condottiere Andrea Zoppo assumes the name of Andrea Orsini in Samuel Shellabarger’s novel of 15th-century Italy, Prince of Foxes, claiming to be an illegitimate offspring of a defunct branch of the famous Orsini family. He rises to become an agent of Cesare Borgia, assisting him in a number of his political and diplomatic intrigues and eventually encounters a real Orsini, the Duke of Gravina, during a military campaign.

== See also ==
- Papal nobility

== Sources ==
- Kleinhenz, Christopher (2004). Medieval Italy: An Encyclopedia. Routledge. ISBN 978-1135948801.
- Rendina, Claudio (2004). Le grandi famiglie di Roma. Rome: Newton Compton.
- Almanach de Gotha (original copy). Germany. 1925 [1905]. (available online — to be linked)
- Paul Theroff's Online Gotha (available online — to be linked).
