= Orsoni =

Orsoni is a surname. Notable people with the surname include:

- Alain Orsoni (1954–2026), French politician and Corsican independence activist
- Bruno Orsoni (born 1973), French freestyle swimmer
- Giorgio Orsoni (born 1946), Italian lawyer and politician
- Giuseppe Orsoni (1691–1755), Italian painter and scenic designer
