= Aaron Paul Orsini =

American psychedelics researcher & advocate

Aaron Paul Orsini is an American author, researcher, and educator. He is best known for his books on the intersection of psychedelics and neurodiversity, including Autism On Acid.

== Early life ==
At the age of 23, Orsini's psychologist diagnosed him with autism. Following his diagnosis, at the age of 27, and enduring some personal losses, Orsini ventured West, where he encountered his first experience with LSD. Orsini reportedly states that it was this first time that led to his discovery to a profound sense of joy and a newfound human comprehension that had eluded him before.

== Career ==
Orsini's first book Autism on Acid written in 2019 was influenced by his first LSD experience which he found to be impactful and inspiring. Orsini's journey has propelled him into the role of a provider as the psychedelic autism collaborative research co-author partner for the University College of London.

== Published books ==
- — (2019). Autism On Acid: How LSD Helped Me Understand, Navigate, Alter & Appreciate My Autistic Perceptions. Independently Published. ISBN 979-87566-8883-2. OL 26857665W.
- — (2021). Autistic Psychedelic: The Self-Reported Benefits and Challenges of Experiencing LSD, MDMA, Psilocybin and Other Psychedelics As Told by Neurodivergent Adults Navigating ADHD, Alexithymia, Anxiety, Asperger's, Autism, Depression, OCD, PTSD and Other Conditions. Independently Published. ISBN 979-8724471879. OL 30831991W.
- — (2022). Introduction to Psychedelic Autism: An Informative & Visually Accessible Handbook Exploring The Potential Benefits & Challenges Of Psychedelic Treatment Options For Individuals Navigating Autism. Independently Published. ISBN 979-8849012650.
- — (2023). Psychedelic Autism: An Informative & Visually Accessible Textbook Exploring Relevant Research, Statistics & Context That Psychedelic Therapists & Facilitators Should Understand When Supporting Autistic Individuals. Independently Published. ISBN 979-8395950505.
