= Virginio Orsini =

Italian condottiero

Gentile Virginio Orsini
- Born: c. 1434
- Died: 8 January 1497 (aged 62–63); Castel dell'Ovo, Naples, Italy
- Children: Gian Giordano Orsini; Carlo Orsini
- Relatives: Napoleone II (father); Francesca Orsini (mother); Giambattista Orsini (cousin)
- Military career
- Allegiance: Papal States, Kingdom of Naples
- Rank: Condottiero
- Conflicts: Battle of Campo Morto (1482); Battle of Fornovo (1495)
- Awards: Knight of the Order of Emellino (1463)

Gentile Virginio Orsini (c. 1434 – 8 January 1497) was an Italian condottiero and vassal of the papal throne and the Kingdom of Naples, mainly remembered as the powerful head of the Orsini family during its feud with Pope Alexander VI (Rodrigo Borgia). Though best known as Lord of Bracciano, during his lifetime he bore many titles, among which Count of Tagliacozzo, Vicovaro and Anguillara, Lord of Cerveteri, Knight of the Order of Emellino (1463), Constable of the Kingdom of Naples and Gonfalonier of the Roman Church. The aforesaid fiefs were all confiscated in favor of the Colonna or the Borgia family during Virginio's conflict with Naples and the Pope.

== Genealogy and military career ==
Gentile Virginio was the son of Napoleone II and Francesca Orsini. On the death of his uncle Carlo (1485), he obtained the reins of his prominent house, at the time an enemy to the King of Naples and an ally of the pontiff. Pope Sixtus IV appointed him general of his forces, which Virginio led to a victory over the Neapolitan army at the Battle of Campo Morto (1482).

Almighty due to pontifical benefices, Virginio took advantage of the disorder which followed Sixtus's death (1484) in order to exterminate the Roman house of Colonna, something he didn't manage completely due to the Sacred College’s restoring the order. During the reign of Innocent VIII (1484–1492), the Orsini family reached the peak of its power and held significant influence over the Roman Curia through Virginio's cousin, Cardinal Giambattista Orsini of Monterotondo. The ascension of Alexander VI to the papal throne (August 1492) changed the status quo in the Roman politics.

== Conflict with the Pope and Naples ==
Afraid of the new Pope's intentions to curb the power of his audacious barons, Virginio approached King Ferdinand I of Naples, who was suspicious of Alexander's relations to King Ferdinand II of Aragon, his formal overlord. It was with Neapolitan financial help that Virginio bought the Roman castles of Cerveteri and Anguillara from Franceschetto Cybo, the son of Pope Innocent VIII. It seems that Alexander VI had already reached an agreement with Cybo over the two fortresses and their unexpected purchase by his chief vassal with Neapolitan money (40,000 ducats) was considered by the Pope as an act of treason. Nevertheless, Alexander and Ferdinand were reconciled in the summer of 1493.

When Charles VIII of France seized Rome in the December 1494, demanding from the Pope to crown him monarch of Naples, the Orsini family hosted his troops in its fortresses and clamored for Alexander VI's deposition together with the Colonna family and most of the Cardinals. Thus Virginio, who had also been named Constable of Naples, betrayed both the Pope and the Aragonese dynasty of Naples.

Hoping to gain benefits for his house by the French king, Virginio followed the French on their campaign in Naples. After the defeat of the French in the Battle of Fornovo (6 June 1495) and the restoration of the Aragonese in Naples the same month, Virginio was arrested and imprisoned by Ferdinand II of Naples, the new Neapolitan king, with the consent of the Pope. He likely died of poison in the Castel dell'Ovo, in Naples (8 January 1497), while Alexander VI was confiscating the Orsini strongholds in the Papal States in favor of the Borgia family.

== Posterity ==
Virginio Orsini had two sons:

- Gian Giordano Orsini, later Prince Assistant to the Papal Throne, by his wife Isabella Orsini (of the Salerno line),
- Carlo Orsini, an illegitimate.

== See also ==
- Orsini family
- Alexander VI
