= Battle of Campomorto =

1482 War of Ferrara battle

The Battle of Campomorto was fought near Frosinone, in the Lazio (Italy) on 21 August 1482, during the War of Ferrara. It saw the Papal army, led by the condottiero Roberto Malatesta, face King Ferdinand I of Naples's army, under the command of Alfonso, Duke of Calabria. Malatesta won the clash. According to Niccolò Machiavelli, "This engagement was fought with more valour than had been shown in any battle in Italy for the last fifty years".
