= Napoleone Orsini (condottiero) =

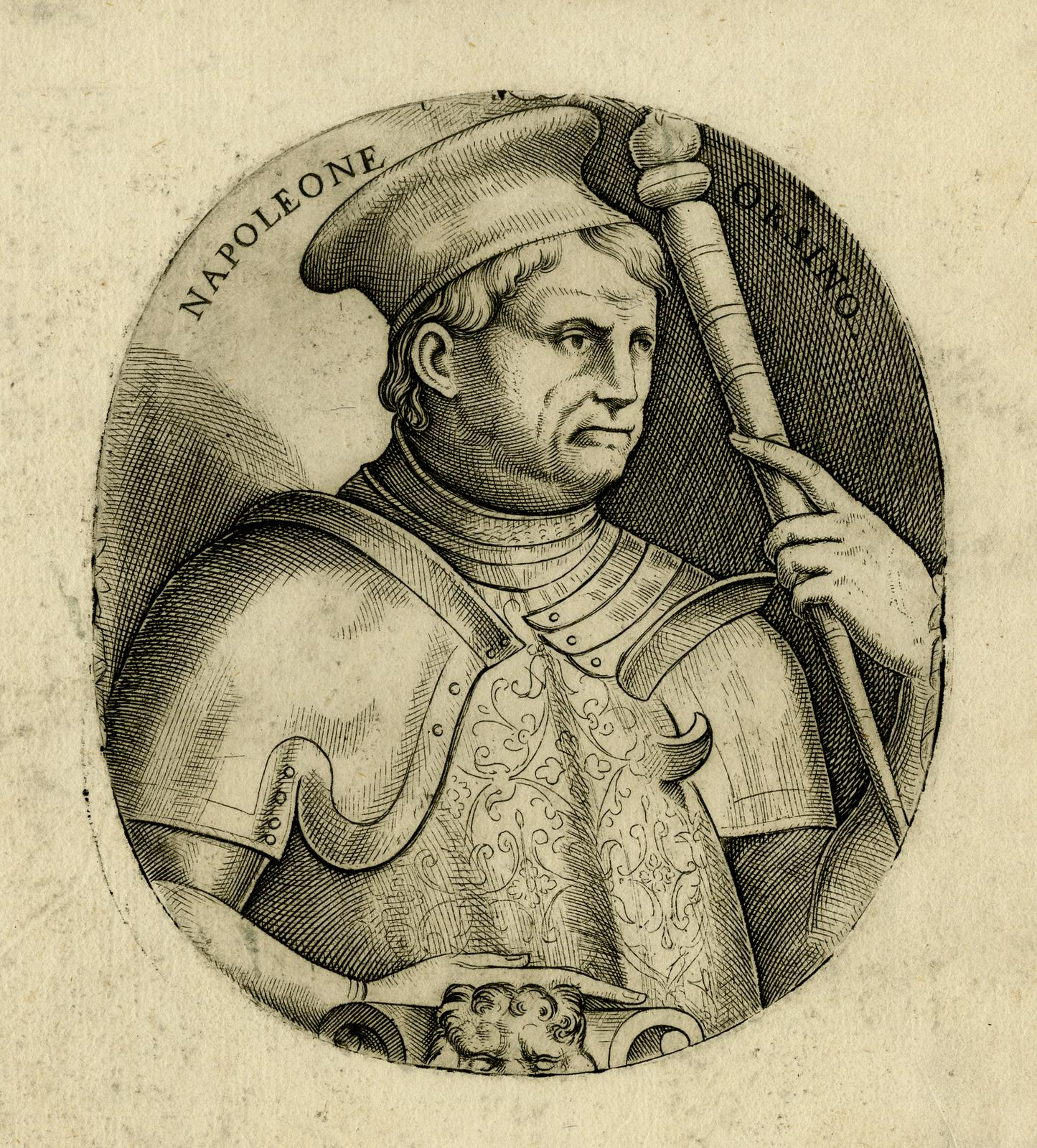
Napoleone Orsini

Napoleone Orsini (c. 1420 – September 1480) was an Italian condottiero.

The son of Orso Orsini of Bracciano, he fought for Pope Eugene IV against Francesco Sforza in 1443. Later, in the 1450s, he flanked Ferdinand of Aragon in the struggle between the Kingdom of Naples and the Duchy of Milan. Subsequently, Orsini fought against the rival baronial families of the Colonna and the Anguillara in the Lazio.

In July 1461 Orsini, leading a contingent of Papal troops, was defeated by Sigismondo Pandolfo Malatesta at Castelleone di Suasa. The following year he was appointed commander-in-chief of the Papal Army and warred against Roberto Malatesta, lord of Rimini, being wounded in the course of the campaign.

Orsini did not take part in any relevant military feat thenceforth.

== Sources ==
- Litta, Pietro (1834). Famiglie celebri italiane. Milan.
- Sansovino, F. (1565). Historia di Casa Orsini. Venice.
