= Vicovaro =

- Comune
- Comune di Vicovaro
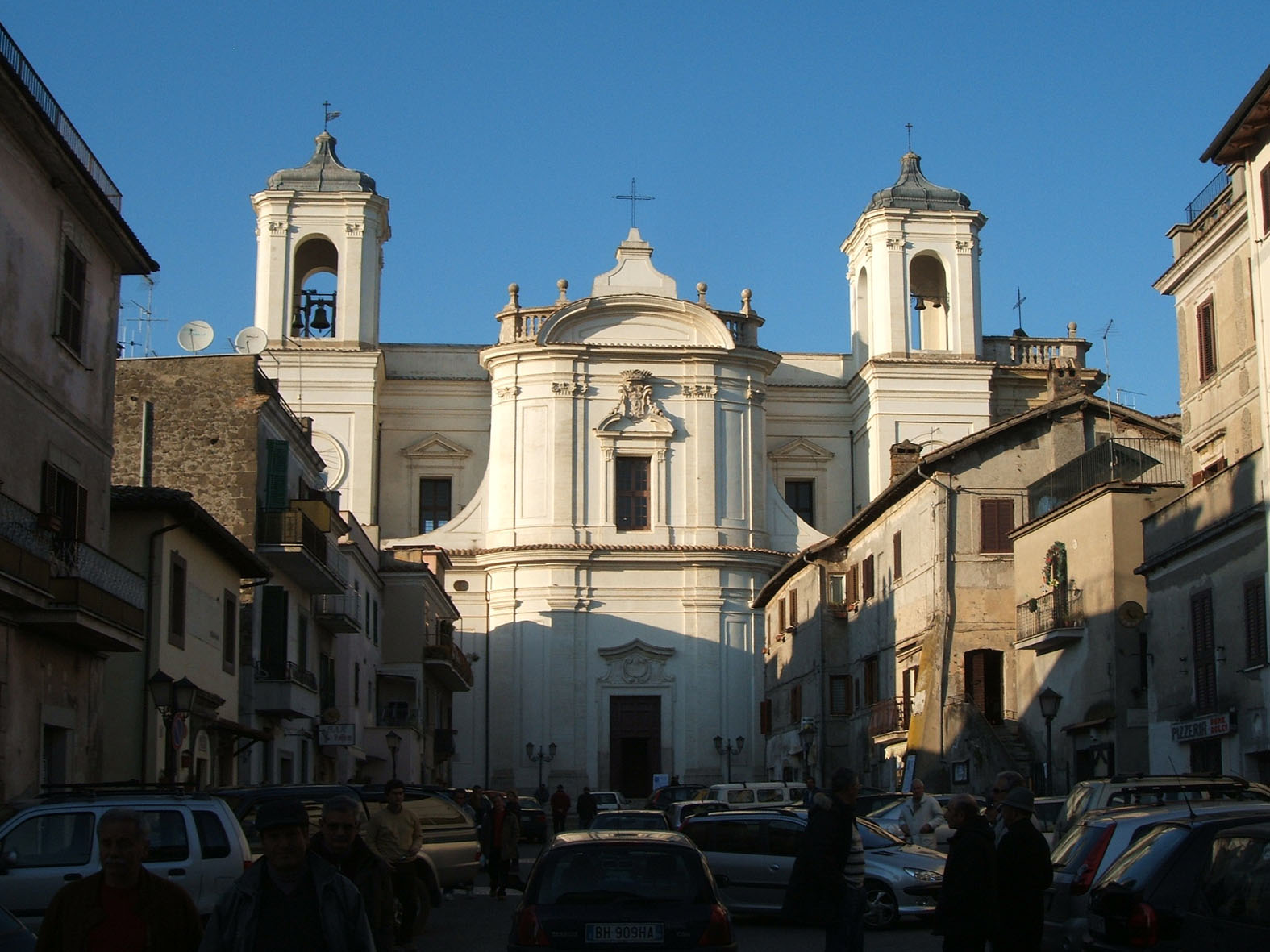
- Church of Saint Peter in Vicovaro

- Location within Italy Location within Lazio
- Coordinates: 42°1′N 12°54′E
- Country: Italy
- Region: Lazio
- Metropolitan city: Rome (RM)
- Frazioni: Sancosimato

Government
  - Mayor: Fiorenzo De Simone

Area
  - Total: 36.1 km^{2} (13.9 sq mi)
- Elevation: 300 m (980 ft)

Population (31 December 2010)
  - Total: 4,108
  - Density: 114/km^{2} (295/sq mi)
- Demonym: Vicovaresi
- Time zone: UTC+1 (CET)
  - Summer (DST): UTC+2 (CEST)
- Postal code: 00029
- Dialing code: 0774

Vicovaro (Latin: Varia, Romanesco: Vicuaru) is a comune (municipality) in the Metropolitan City of Rome in the Italian region Lazio, located about 45 kilometres (28 mi) northeast of Rome.

== History ==
The area of Vicovaro was inhabited as early as the Neolithic period, as testified by remains dating from this period to the late Bronze Age. It was a city of the Aequi, later colonized by Rome. During the Roman domination, it was known as Vicus Varronis, Vicus Vari or Vicus Valerius. It was on the Via Valeria.

Pope Celestine III granted Vicovaro to his Orsini relatives. The town held strategic importance in the Aniene valley. In 1533, Ludovico Gonzaga seized Vicovaro in a conflict between the Orsini and the Medici pope Clement VII. After the surrender, Gonzaga was assassinated by Napoleone Orsini who shot him with an arquebus.

In 1692, Orsini properties were auctioned off to satisfy debts, and Vicovaro fell to Count Paulo Bolognetti. His son, Ferdinando, married Flavia Theodoli, sister of Marchese Gerolamo Theodoli. The Bolognettis refurbished and expanded the Orsini castle and initiated other building projects in the city. Theodoli oversaw the restoration of the Church of San Pietro for his nephew, Giacomo Bolognetti.

== Main sights ==
- Palazzo Cenci Bolognetti, a former residence of the Orsini. It includes parts of a rocca (castle) with cylindrical towers, remains of the keep and an entrance with a Gothic marble arch from the 14th century.
- Church of San Giacomo, commissioned by Giovanni Antonio Orsini to Giovanni Dalmata (upper part) and others (lower part).
- Church of San Pietro (17th century)
- Monastery of San Cosimato (6th century)
