= Vittoria Accoramboni =

Italian noblewoman

- Duchess of Bracciano
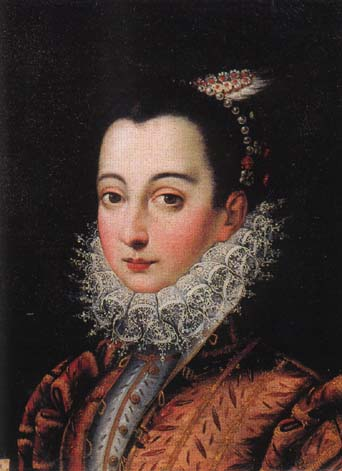
- Vittoria Accoramboni by Scipione Pulzone
- Predecessor: Isabella de' Medici
- Successor: Flavia Peretti
- Born: 15 February 1557; Gubbio, Umbria, Papal States
- Died: 22 December 1585 (aged 28)
- Spouse: Paolo Giordano I Orsini (m. 1585; died 1585)

Vittoria Accoramboni, Duchess of Bracciano (15 February 1557 – 22 December 1585) was an Italian noblewoman. Her life became the basis for John Webster's play The White Devil, several novels, and a novella by Stendhal.

== Biography ==
She was born in Gubbio in Umbria, Papal States, the tenth child in a family belonging to the minor nobility of Gubbio, who migrated to Rome with a view to bettering their fortunes. After refusing several offers of marriage for Vittoria, her father betrothed her to Francesco Peretti, a man of no position, but a nephew of Cardinal Montalto, who was regarded as likely to become pope.

Vittoria was admired by men in Rome, and being extravagant although poor, she and her husband were soon in debt. Among her admirers was Paolo Giordano I Orsini, Duke of Bracciano, one of the powerful men in Rome. Her brother Marcello, wishing to see her the duke's wife, had her husband Peretti murdered in 1581. The duke himself was suspected of complicity, inasmuch as he was believed to have murdered his first wife, Isabella de' Medici. Now that Vittoria was free Giordano I Orsini made her an offer of marriage, which she accepted, and they were married shortly after.

But her good fortune aroused much jealousy, and attempts were made to annul the marriage (in particular, Pope Gregory XIII was opposed to it); she was imprisoned in the Castel Sant'Angelo and only liberated due to public pressure and through the intervention of Cardinal Carlo Borromeo. On the death of Gregory XIII, Cardinal Montalto, her first husband's uncle, was elected in his place as Pope Sixtus V (1585); he vowed vengeance on the duke of Bracciano and Vittoria, who, warned in time, fled first to Venice and thence to Salò in Venetian territory. Here the duke died in November 1585, bequeathing to his widow all his personal property. The duchy of Bracciano passed to his son by his first wife.

Vittoria, overwhelmed with grief, went to live in retirement at Padua, where she was followed by Lodovico Orsini, a relation of her late husband and a servant of the Venetian republic, to arrange amicably for the division of the property. But a quarrel having arisen in this connection, Lodovico hired a band of bravi and had Vittoria assassinated at the end of 1585. He himself and nearly all his accomplices were afterwards put to death by order of the republic.

== References in literature ==
Her story formed the basis of John Webster's drama tragedy, The White Devil, or The Tragedy of Paolo Giordano Ursini, Duke of Brachiano (1612), of Stendhal's novella Vittoria Accoramboni (1837–1839), of Ludwig Tieck's novel, Vittoria Accoramboni (1840) and of Robert Merle's novel l'Idole (1987) published in English translation as Vittoria. A tennis ball called the Beautiful White Devil is named after her in A Room with a View.
