= Eleonora di Garzia di Toledo =

Italian noblewoman

- Born: March 1553; Florence, Duchy of Florence
- Died: 10 July 1576 (aged 23); Villa Medici at Cafaggiolo, Grand Duchy of Tuscany
- Cause of death: Murder
- Noble family: House of Alba
- Spouse: Pietro de' Medici
- Issue: Cosimo de' Medici
- Father: García Álvarez de Toledo y Osorio
- Mother: Vittoria d'Ascanio Colonna

Eleonora di Garzia di Toledo or Leonor Álvarez de Toledo Osorio (March 1553 – 10 July 1576), (Note: This article uses the Italian version of Leonora's name because her mother was Italian, she lived her whole life in Florence, and the sources for her life are mainly Italian. The secondary sources consulted for this article use the Italian form; the Spanish form is used for Leonora's father and grandfather.) more often known as "Leonora" or "Dianora", (Note: "Dianora" was her pet name as a child, to distinguish her from her Aunt Eleonora; as she grew up, she was more commonly called "Leonora".) was the daughter of García Álvarez de Toledo, 4th Marquis of Villafranca, Duke of Fernandina. Leonora was born in Florence, where she was raised by Cosimo I de' Medici, Grand Duke of Tuscany and his wife Eleanor of Toledo, her aunt and namesake.

Betrothed to their son Pietro at the age of 15, she was mentored by Pietro's older sister, the artistic patron Isabella de' Medici, and was considered a vivacious and witty beauty. Her marriage, like Isabella's, was not a success, and she followed her mentor's example of taking lovers. For this reason, Pietro had her brought in 1576 to the country retreat of Cafaggiolo, where he strangled her to death with a dog leash. Cosimo's successor, Francesco I, tacitly approved the murder, and Pietro was never punished for it.

Until recently, little was known of Leonora di Garzia di Toledo, and she was not identified as the sitter of several portraits of her. The facts of her life have emerged from the growing scholarship on Isabella de' Medici, with whom she has much in common. In the view of art historian Gabrielle Langdon, "Her story is valuable in revealing attitudes and legalities attendant on the lives and decorum of women in the early-modern Italian court".

== Biography ==
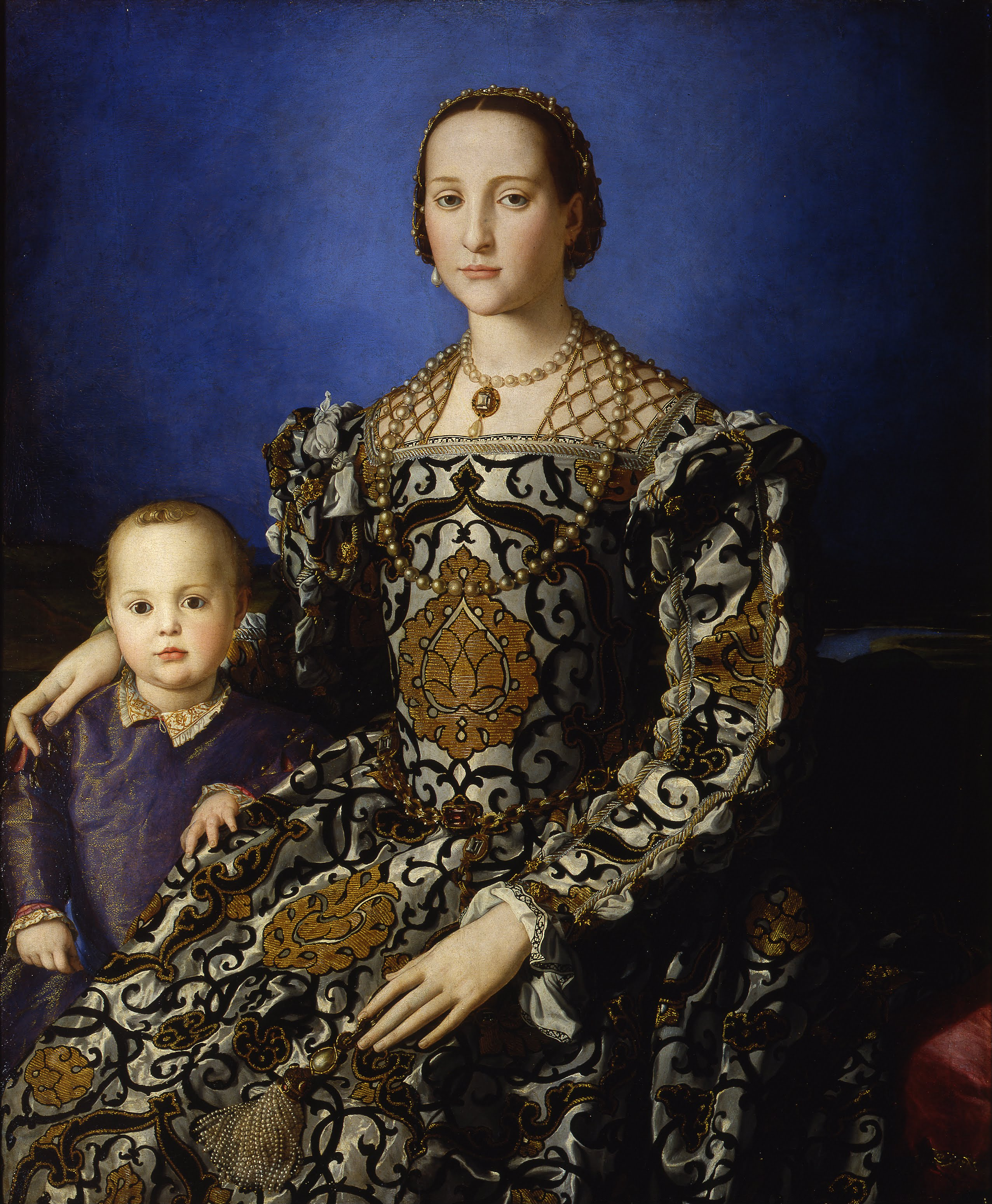
Eleonora di Toledo, Duchess of Florence, with her son Giovanni. By Agnolo Bronzino, 1545. The duchess raised her niece and namesake, Leonora, with her own children.

=== Early life ===
Born at the Florentine court in March 1553, Leonora was the daughter of García Álvarez de Toledo y Osorio, Marquis of Villafranca del Bierzo and Duke of Fernandina, and Vittoria d'Ascanio Colonna. (Note: Vittoria d'Ascanio Colonna was the daughter of Ascanio Colonna, Duke of Paliano, and therefore the niece of Vittoria Colonna, the poet.) Her father and mother were staying in Florence because García Álvarez had charge of the castles of Valdichiana in the region. When Vittoria Colonna died a few months later, Leonora was left in the care of her aunt Eleonora, the Grand Duchess of Florence. Eleonora and Cosimo raised her lovingly at the Medici court, where she remained for the rest of her life, in effect a menina—a girl groomed for a life at court, in the Spanish tradition of courtly fostering.

García Álvarez went on to become the Viceroy of Catalonia (1558–64) and the Viceroy of Sicily (1564–66) on behalf of Philip II of Spain, and served as Philip's commander at the Battle of Lepanto in 1571. He was the son of Pedro Álvarez de Toledo (1484–1553), the Spanish Viceroy of Naples. The family came from the grandee class of Spanish nobles, the highest in the land, which was often entrusted with viceroyal powers in Spanish and Habsburg territories; Toledo has been called "Christendom's wealthiest benefice". In 1539, Pedro Alvarez de Toledo's daughter Eleonora had been married to the Grand Duke of Florence, Cosimo I de' Medici, as part of a process of legitimising the Medici grand ducal title, granted only in 1532, under Habsburg auspices. She went on to bear Cosimo 11 children, including the future grand dukes Francesco and Ferdinando, as well as Pietro and Isabella.

After Eleonora died in 1562, Cosimo's daughter Isabella replaced her as the first lady of Florence. She acted as a surrogate consort and also took over the supervision of Leonora's upbringing. The red-headed Leonora, who possessed a natural charm, was popular in the Medici family. At the age of five, she was reported as being a comfort to Cosimo's second daughter Lucrezia, from whom she became inseparable, when Lucrezia was apart from her husband Alfonso d'Este. Lucrezia died in 1561, leaving Isabella as Cosimo's only surviving daughter; the grand duke was, however, extremely fond of Leonora, and treated her as his own daughter. He was charmed by her vivacity and physical vigour—she delighted in horsemanship and arms—though he occasionally gently reminded her to behave with more decorum. Owing to the close family and political ties between the House of Medici and the viceroyal family of Toledo, a marriage was arranged between Leonora and Cosimo's son Pietro, with whom she had grown up and who was of a similar age. The couple were betrothed in 1568 when Leonora was 15, with the approval of Philip II of Spain. Garcia Álvarez de Toledo provided her with a dowry of 40,000 gold ducats. (Note: According to Langdon, writing in 2006, this equates to 15–18 million dollars in today's money.) They were married at the Palazzo Vecchio in April 1571, and it was reported that Pietro had to be forced to consummate the union. (Note: "Fatto per forza torre in moglie la Toledana." The ambassador to Urbino, quoted by Langdon, 176. In Murphy's account, Pietro did not consummate the marriage until April 1572, as reported by the Ferrarese ambassador, Conegrano. Pietro nevertheless had affairs with other women, and the reasons for his aversion to sexual intercourse with Leonora are unknown.) On 10 February 1573, Leonora gave birth to a son, Cosimo ("Cosimino"), who was the sole male Medici heir in this generation (Note: Francesco and Joanna did not produce a son until 1577.) until his death three years later, in August 1576, one month after his mother's death. According to rumors, the infant was poisoned on the orders of Pietro, who doubted his paternity.

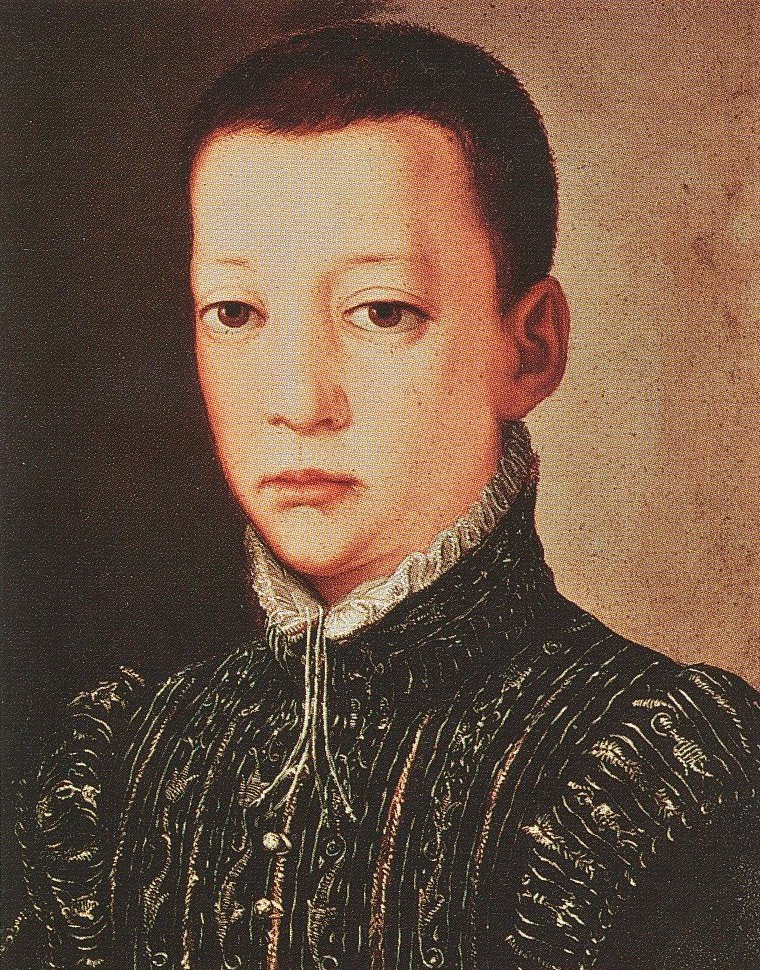
Pietro de' Medici, the youngest and most disturbed of Cosimo I's children. Workshop of Agnolo Bronzino, 1560s.

=== Married life ===
For Leonora, the marriage brought both advantages and disadvantages. On the one hand, it cemented her relationship with one of the richest families in Europe and allowed her to remain at a court where women were often granted more freedom, or at least discretion, than elsewhere; on the other hand, Pietro was the least stable of the Medici offspring, exhibiting from an early age a cruel and disturbed temperament that troubled his parents. (Note: Murphy suggests he had "what would now be called learning difficulties: he was short-tempered and violent, his behaviour, some believed, the result of his mother's death and the subsequent 'liberty with which he grew up' ".) As a result, the marriage, unlike that of Cosimo and Eleonora, was never a physical and emotional success. In this it resembled that of Isabella de' Medici, whose protégée Leonora became, and Paolo Giordano I Orsini. Duke Cosimo had married his beloved daughter Isabella into the House of Orsini for political reasons, to strengthen his position on the borders of southern Tuscany. Although Isabella had two children by Paolo Giordano, she had chosen not to live at her husband's castle at Bracciano or in Rome, where he conducted his political and amorous affairs. Instead, with Cosimo's permission, she had remained in Florence, cultivating an artistic salon at her Villa Baroncelli in the south of the city, (Note: This villa, south of the Arno River on the Arcetri hills, was later known as Villa del Poggio Imperiale, after the Habsburg Archduchess Maria Magdalena of Austria (1589–1631), wife of Cosimo II de' Medici, Grand Duke of Tuscany "She brought a vivacity and cultural lustre to the Medici court that ushered it into its second phase of development, as a flourishing centre for music, literature, and intensely patriotic linguistic endeavours centred on the codification of vernacular Tuscan as the official language of Italy.") and discreetly taking lovers, notably Troilo Orsini, a cousin of her husband's. Leonora became part of Isabella's circle and renowned for her beauty and vivacity. Like Isabella, she sponsored charities and the arts, serving as the patron of the literary Accademia degli Alterati. (Note: The Alterati met twice a week to discuss poetry, plays, and the promotion of the Tuscan language.) Neglected by her husband, she also followed Isabella's example in taking lovers. Under the liberal Cosimo, such behaviour was tolerated as long as discretion was maintained and the marriages reaped political advantages. The women's respective husbands conducted affairs of their own, leading largely separate lives.

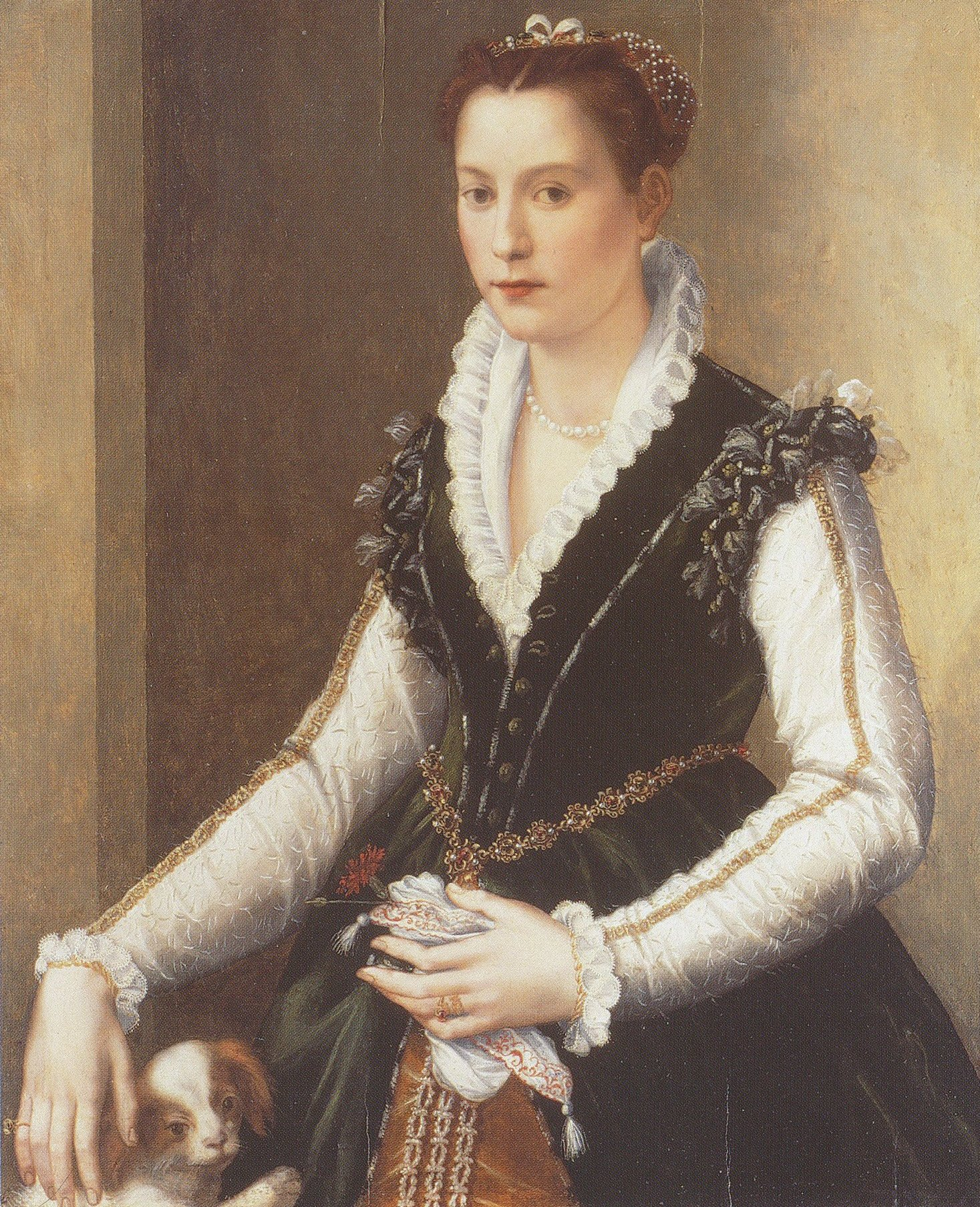
Isabella de' Medici, Leonora's mentor and confidante, with whom she shared much in common. By Alessandro Allori, early 1560s.

Thus matters stood until the death of Cosimo, by then raised to the title of grand duke, in 1574. His son and successor, the reclusive Grand Duke Francesco, was, however, very different. Though he maintained a mistress of his own, (Note: Francesco's mistress was Bianca Cappello.) much to the distress of his wife, Joanna of Austria, Cosimo's eldest son was a much less sociable and tolerant ruler than his father. Rather than attend court and participate in the artistic life of Florence, he preferred to pursue science, often locking himself up in his laboratory in the Casino of San Marco to carry out experiments in alchemy, poisons, and porcelain-making. Unfortunately for Isabella, her brother did not look upon her lifestyle as indulgently as their father Cosimo. While he continued to cultivate the advantageous relations between her husband's house and Florence, he was less willing to turn a blind eye to the behaviour of Isabella and Leonora and to the complaints of their spouses, for whom their adultery was a question of honour rather than jealousy. Eleven years younger than Isabella, Leonora was somewhat less prudent in her amorous adventures. (Note: For example, in 1573, Cosimo's second wife, Camilla Martelli, accused Leonora of flirting with a servant; and in 1575, Leonora tearfully and indiscreetly confessed to the Ferrarese ambassador, Ercole Cortile, that her husband refused to sleep with her, preferring the company of whores—Cortile naturally reported the conversation to his duke. "She really is the most unfortunate and unhappy princess that ever lived," he wrote, "especially for being one so beautiful and accomplished".) Neither woman, however, grasped the danger posed to them by the new regime or the extremity of the plotting that began to coil against them.

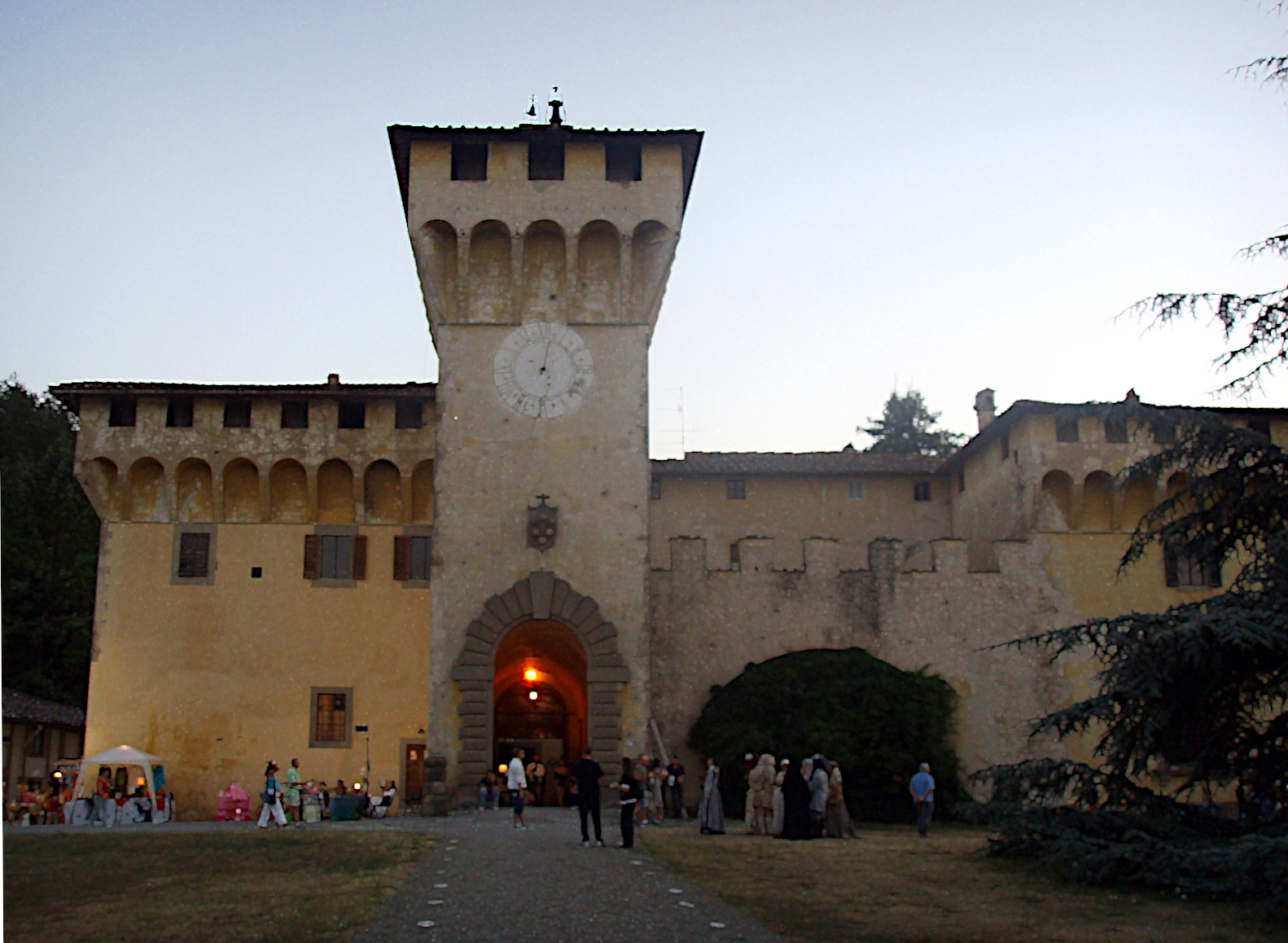
The castellated Villa Medici at Cafaggiolo, 25km north of Florence

=== Death ===
On 11 July 1576, Pietro de' Medici sent a note to his brother, Grand Duke Francesco, from the Villa Medici at Cafaggiolo, north of Florence: "Last night at six hours an accident occurred to my wife and she died. Therefore Your Highness be at peace and write me what I should do, and if I should come back or not." The next day, Francesco wrote to his brother Ferdinando in Rome: "Last night, around five o'clock, a really terrible accident happened to Donna Leonora. She was found in bed, suffocated, and Don Pietro and the others were not in time to revive her".

In fact, Leonora's death was not an accident: Pietro had murdered her in cold blood, with Francesco's connivance. She was 23. Six days later in a similar manner her best friend, Isabella de' Medici, was strangled by her husband, Paolo Giordano, and an assistant at the remote Medici villa at Cerreto Guidi. Francesco announced the death of his sister as an accident. On 29 July, the ambassador of the Duchy of Ferrara wrote in code to Alfonso d'Este:

I advise Your Excellency of the announcement of the death of Lady Isabella; of which I heard as soon as I arrived in Bologna, [and] has displeased as many as had the Lady Leonora's; both ladies were strangled, one at Cafaggiolo and the other at Cerreto. Lady Leonora was strangled on Tuesday night; having danced until two o'clock, and having gone to bed, she was surprised by Lord Pietro [with] a dog leash at her throat, and after much struggle to save herself, finally expired. And the same Lord Pietro bears the sign, having two fingers of his hand injured by [them being] bitten by the lady. And if he had not called for help two wretches from Romagna, who claim to have been summoned there precisely for this purpose, he would perhaps have fared worse. The poor lady, as far as we can understand, made a very strong defence, as was seen by the bed, which was found all convulsed, and by the voices which were heard by the entire household. As soon as she died, she was placed in a coffin prepared there for this event, and taken to Florence in a litter at six o'clock in the morning, led by those from the villa, and accompanied with eight white tapers [carried] by six brothers and four priests; she was interred as if she were a commoner.

The diarist Agostino Lapini recorded that everyone knew very well that Leonora had been killed. "[S]he was ... beautiful, gracious, genteel, becoming, charming, affable," he wrote, "and above all had two eyes in her head which were like two stars in their beauty". Bastiano Arditi recorded that she was "deposited in a box, in San Lorenzo, without any other ceremonies".

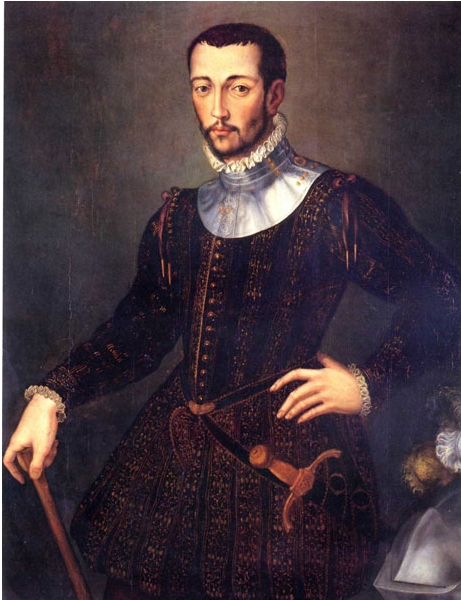
Francesco I de' Medici, Grand Duke of Tuscany. Anon, late 1560s.

At first, Grand Duke Francesco put it about that Leonora had died of a heart attack. But the Florence grapevine knew otherwise, and the Spanish were outraged at this treatment of such a high-ranking subject of their crown. Under pressure, Francesco eventually admitted the truth. He wrote to Philip II of Spain, on whose favour his title depended: "Although in the letter I had told you of Donna Eleonora's accident, I have nevertheless to say to His Catholic Majesty that Lord Pietro our brother had taken her life himself because of the treason she had committed through behaviour unbecoming to a lady ... We wish that His Majesty should know the truth ... and at the first opportunity he will be sent the proceedings through which she should have known with what just reasons Lord Pietro acted".

The "proceedings" Francesco had in mind concerned the documented behaviour of Leonora's lover Bernardino Antinori, who had often been seen publicly with her in her coach. Francesco had imprisoned Antinori, a hero of the Battle of Lepanto and member of the prestigious Order of Saint Stephen, (Note: The Order of Sant Stephen had been founded by Duke Cosimo in 1562 as part of his policy of endowing his parvenu Medici duchy with a chivalric vestige of legitimacy.) on Elba in June 1576, having briefly imprisoned him earlier in the year for brawling. Love letters and poems written by Antinori, extolling Leonora's beauty and charms in minute Petrarchian detail, were "found hidden in her foot stool". Antinori was strangled in his cell two days before Leonora met the same fate. There was also a political dimension to the murders, because Antinori and another associate of Leonora's, Pierino Ridolfi—according at least to Ridolfi's confession under torture—were implicated in an anti-Medici vendetta led by Orazio Pucci. (Note: In 1575, Cortile reported to the Duke of Ferrara: "Pierino Ridolfi has been accused of plotting to kill Don Pietro while he was in a whorehouse, to murder his son and poison Cardinal Ferdinando. He is in the service of Donna Leonora and the duke is in a great rage with her for having given Pierino a necklace worth 200 scudi and a horse on which to escape". Francesco, reported Cortile, was "prepared to wash his hands of his sister-in-law". Murphy regards these charges against Leonora as excessive, particularly the notion that she would plot the death of her own son.) For this reason, Francesco convinced himself that Leonora's misdemeanours had also encompassed treason.

Francesco's approval meant that Pietro was never brought to justice for Leonora's murder, despite the protests of her brother Pedro Álvarez de Toledo y Colonna that her death was unacceptable. Just over a year after the murder, Francesco exiled Pietro to the Spanish court, where he largely spent the rest of his life, visiting Florence only to beg money to pay his gambling debts. Francesco sent Pietro away "to see if he makes a man of this house and rises above the indolence that vainly consumes the best years of his youth". Francesco died in 1587 of malaria; Pietro died in 1604, unreformed and mired in debt.
