= War of the Montferrat Succession =

War in Northwestern Italy from 1613-1617

- Italy in 1600. Montferrat is portrayed as part of Mantua.
Date	1613 – 1617
Location	Northwestern Italy
Result	Treaty of Pavia
Territorial changes	Status quo ante bellum

Belligerents
Supporting the Duke of Mantua: Duchy of Mantua; Montferrat (Spain) Spanish Empire; Tuscany (1613); Holy Roman Empire; Kingdom of Naples; Genoa; France (1613–14)	Supporting the Duke of Savoy: Duchy of Savoy; Montferrat; France (1615–17); Tuscany (1613); Venice

Commanders and leaders
Ferdinando Gonzaga; Charles I of Nevers; Mainfroi of Castillon (Spain) Juan de Mendoza (1613-15) (Spain) Pedro de Toledo (1615-17)	(Savoy) Charles Emmanuel I (Kingdom of France) François of Lesdiguières

The War of the Montferrat Succession (Italian: Guerra di successione del Monferrato) was a war of succession from 1613 to 1617 over the Duchy of Montferrat in northwestern Italy.

== Background ==
In 1631, Montferrat was a Duchy bordering the Duchy of Savoy, but which had been ruled since 1533 by the non-adjacent Duchy of Mantua, which lay 200 km further to the east. The direct cause of the conflict was the death of duke Francesco IV Gonzaga of Mantua and Montferrat on 22 December 1612 without male heirs. His brother Ferdinando Gonzaga was a cardinal, but renounced his ecclesiastical career in order to succeed his brother in both the Duchy of Mantua and the Duchy of Montferrat. However, Francesco's wife Margaret of Savoy was the daughter of duke Charles Emmanuel I of Savoy, who claimed Montferrat now fell to Maria, the 3-year-old daughter of Francesco and Margaret.

Charles Emmanuel of Savoy invoked the treaty of 1 May 1330 on the occasion of the marriage of Yolande Palaeologina of Montferrat, daughter of Theodore I, Marquess of Montferrat, and Argentine Spinola, with Aymon, Count of Savoy. The treaty stipulated that when the male descendants of the marquis of Montferrat went extinct, those of Yolande (and thus the House of Savoy) would succeed in the marquisate, to provide the daughters with money. The matter should have been adjudicated by the Holy Roman Emperor, but with the latter busy due to the Brothers' Quarrel, Savoy invaded Monferrato in April 1613.

== The war ==
The subsequent war brought Ferdinando the support of Spain. Although the Spanish minister, Duke of Lerma, had ordered the Spanish forces in Milan to avoid war, governor Juan de Mendoza, Marquis de la Hinojosa pressed for intervention given that the city of Casale, the capital of Montferrat, controlled the road between the Spanish aligned positions of Genoa and Milan. Hinojosa's counterattack in 1614 evicted Charles Emmmanuel from Monferrat and invaded his own territory in the Piedmont, but Lerma was adamant in avoiding a major conflict and mistrusted Hinojosa's aptitude. The governor was eventually forced into accepting the mediation of France, withdrawing his forces by the signing of the Peace of Asti in June 1615.

Late into 1615, as Lerma became increasingly criticized, the Spanish court called to reject the Peace of Asti and disavow the truce, recalling Hinojosa as a political scapegoat. Savoy now received the support of French governor of Dauphine, François of Lesdiguières, even against orders from Regent Marie de' Medici and Bishop Richelieu of earning Spanish reprisals against France. Savoy was also reinforced by Venice, which funded a third of its war expenses, and by Ernst von Mansfeld of the Protestant Union, who brought a German mercenary army. Charles also promoted himself as a liberator of Italy against the rule of Spain, which controlled most of the Italian Peninsula at the time.

Charles opened war again by reconquering Monferrat again, but his position failed to solidify. The majority of the French forces had not arrived, while Venice had become embroiled in the Uskok War. Charles' claims of Italian freedom had been largely rejected by local Italian rulers, who continued to see Spain as the best guarantor of regional peace. The arrival of the new Spanish governor, Pedro de Toledo, Marquis of Villafranca, turned around the war effort, conquering Vercelli and breaking again into Piedmont. Capitalizing on the momentum, the Spanish court pressed into an end of the conflict by French and Papal mediation. Therefore, a double peace was signed in 1617 with the treaties of Pavia and Madrid, putting an end both the Monfterrat succession and the Uskok War.

According to the peace settlement, the succession dispute between Charles Emmanuel and Ferdinando would be solved by an Imperial tribunal, both Spain and Savoy would disarm, and occupied territories would be restored to Savoy and the Montferrat. Ferdinando was ultimately confirmed Duke of Mantua and Montferrat as intended.

== Aftermath ==
When Ferdinando died in 1626, his brother Vincenzo II (1594–1627), also a cardinal, succeeded him as Duke of Mantua and Montferrat. Despite marrying, following the resignation of Ferdinando and the expulsion of Vincenzo from the Sacred College of Cardinals (for violating the celibacy), neither produced any legitimate children. A new crisis erupted when Vincenzo II died on 26 December 1627, leading to the War of the Mantuan Succession (1627–1632).

== Battles ==
- First siege of Alba (22 April 1613)
- Siege of Trino (26 April 1613)
- Siege of Moncalvo (23 April – 8 May 1613)
- Siege of Nizza Monferrato (14 – 23 May 1613)
- Sieges of Asti (first siege in May 1615, second siege in 1616) – Piedmontese forces repel Spanish attempts to capture the town
- Second siege of Alba (1617) – French and Piedmontese troops capture the town
- Siege of Vercelli (from 24 May to 25 July 1617) – Spanish forces capture the town.

== Bibliography ==
- Asbach, Olaf; Schroder, Peter (2016). The Ashgate Research Companion to the Thirty Years' War. Taylor and Francis. ISBN 9781317041344.
- Wilson, Peter (2011). The Thirty Years War: Europe’s Tragedy. Harvard University. ISBN 9780674062313.
