= Trautmannsdorf =

Trautmannsdorf may refer to:

== Places ==
- Trautmannsdorf in Oststeiermark, Austria
- Trautmannsdorf an der Leitha, Austria
- Trautmannsdorf, part of Geras, Austria

== People ==
- Trauttmansdorff (family), Austrian-Bohemian noble family (1635 counts, 1805 princes)
- Adam von Trautmannsdorf
- Ferdinand von Trauttmansdorff
- Maximilian von und zu Trauttmansdorff

== See also ==
- Trauttmansdorff Castle in Tyrol, northern Italy
  - Trauttmansdorff Castle Gardens
