= Rouen porcelain =

17th century porcelain from Rouen, France

Rouen porcelain is soft-paste porcelain made in the city of Rouen, Normandy, France, during a brief period from about 1673 to 1696. It was the earliest French porcelain, but was probably never made on a commercial basis; only nine pieces are now thought to survive.

Rouen had been a centre for the production of Rouen faience (tin-glazed earthenware pottery), since at least the 1540s. Louis Poterat, the owner of the porcelain factory, came from the leading family of faience producers in the city at the time, and continued his faience production in another factory.

== History ==
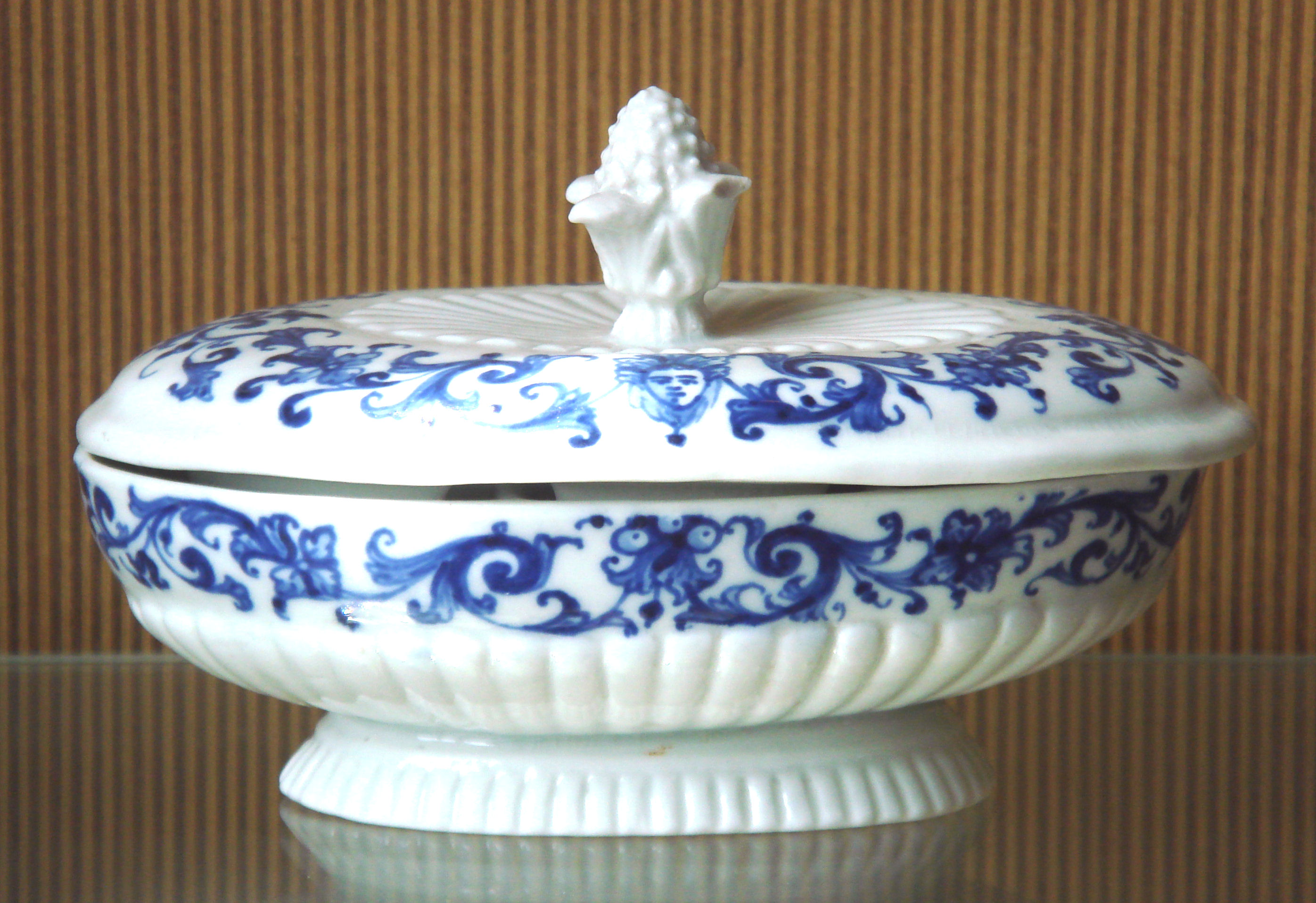
Rouen soft-paste porcelain cup with lid, end of the 17th century.

In 1644 Nicolas Poirel, sieur (lord) of Grandval, obtained a fifty-year royal monopoly over the production of faience in Rouen. By 1647 a factory owned by Edme Poterat (1612–87), who was probably an experienced potter, was producing faience, by arrangement with Poirel. Louis Poterat, eldest son of Edme, was granted a monopoly in 1673 for the making of porcelain in all France. The monopoly made no reference to an earlier one granted in 1664 to Claude Révérend, a Paris importer of Dutch pottery, which does not seem to have resulted in any successful manufacture. Révérend claimed to have perfected the process in Holland; it was perhaps just a sort of faience.

In the 17th century Europeans were unaware that very specific clays, high in kaolin, were needed for porcelain, and also that a very high firing temperature was needed, in fact one higher than most European kilns could have reached, even if the potters were aware of the need. Many thought that the translucency of the Chinese porcelain they sought to emulate would be achieved if the paste included generous quantities of ground glass. The product resulting from these attempts is called soft-paste porcelain, which despite many disadvantages proved an acceptable substitute for true Asian hard-paste porcelain in both England and France, being manufactured until after 1800 in both countries. For example, the leading French factory, Sèvres, continued to make both types until 1804.

In the 1670s the only soft-paste porcelain to have been produced in Europe was the Medici porcelain made for a brief period in Florence a century earlier. This was made from about 1575 to 1587 as a project sponsored by Francesco I de' Medici, Grand Duke of Tuscany. Some 60–70 examples survive, nearly all in various museum collections around the world. Like Rouen porcelain, they are nearly all in underglaze blue on white, with darker manganese outlines; there are a handful that are plain, or use two colours.

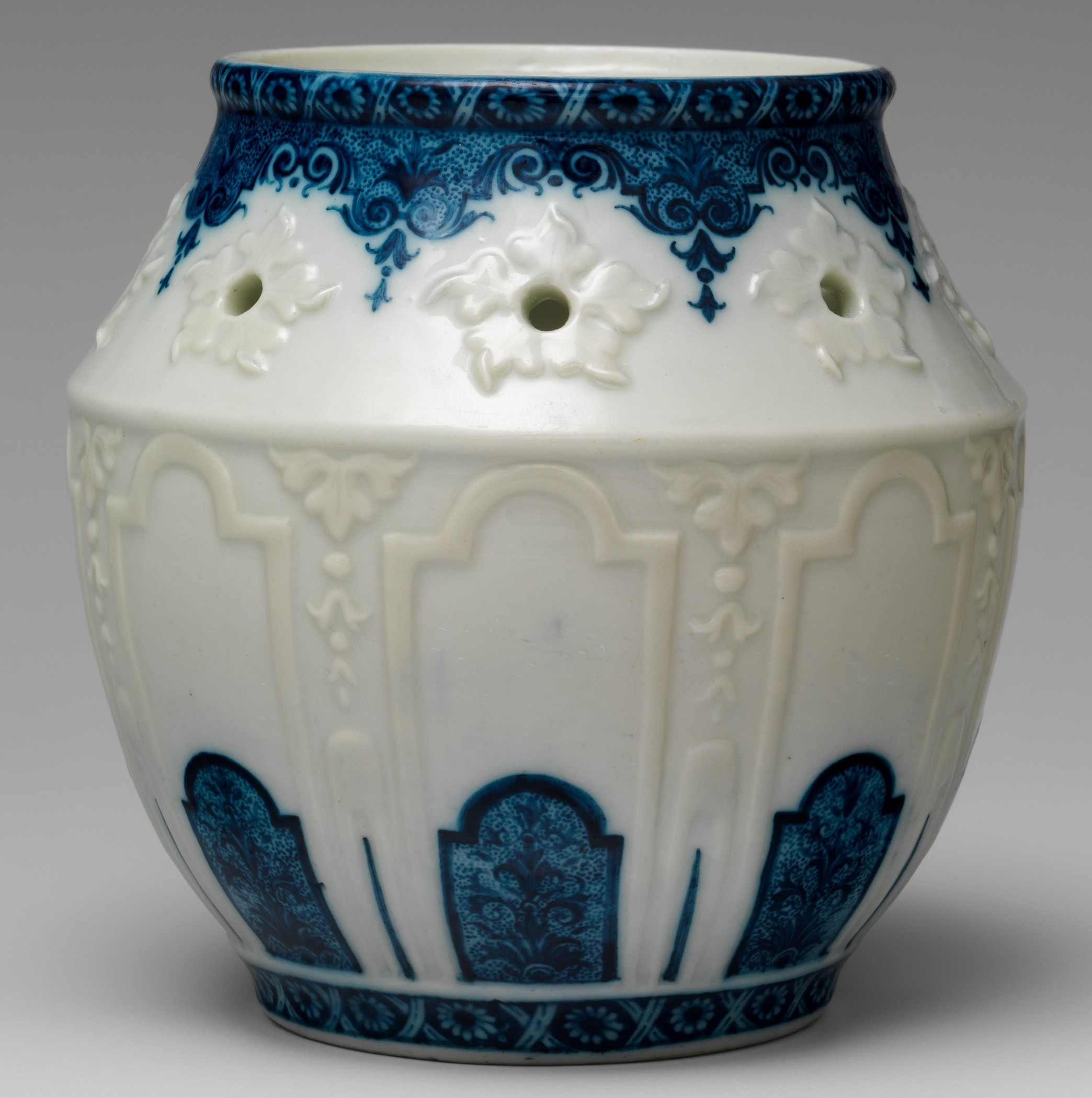
Pot pourri jar, Metropolitan Museum of Art, 5 in. (12.7 cm) tall.

The new Rouen soft-paste porcelain material appears to have been invented by Louis' father Edme. At this time imports of both Chinese export porcelain and its Japanese equivalent had reached high levels, and governments and potters across Europe were very keen to develop their own industry, a goal not properly fulfilled until Meissen porcelain was developed many decades later.

== Characteristics and key pieces ==
Rouen produced the first soft-paste porcelain in France, but only nine surviving soft-paste pieces are now generally attributed to Rouen, with a possible tenth. Many other claimants have been reassigned to Saint-Cloud porcelain, which is often very similar. None are marked, and an important piece of evidence is the coat-of-arms of the Norman lawyer Asselin de Villequiers on the mustard pot (illustrated below), now in the Sèvres museum. His arms are also found on Rouen faience.

All are (like Chinese blue and white porcelain) decorated with underglaze painting using cobalt blue; the blue is often a very deep colour. In most, the tone of the "white" glazed body tends to a grey green, and five of the nine have distinctive areas of blue stippling, including the mustard pot and the New York pot pourri jar illustrated here. Both also share the "organization of the painted decoration within shaped panels", which is found on two of the other pieces. There is another pot pourri jar on the same model as the New York one; this draws from contemporary styles in silver. There are no recorded dates for production, the royal patent of 1673 being taken as the earliest possible date; it is assumed Rouen porcelain production ceased after the death of Louis Poterat in 1696.

The porcelain at Rouen became known as "Porcelaine française". These events followed the creation of the French East India Company in 1664, and the influx of Chinese wares it generated. The Rouen paste was very light, lighter than any other French make except Sèvres porcelain, and clearly less amber than Saint-Cloud porcelain. In contrast with Saint-Cloud, Rouen porcelain was only produced on a small scale and failed to be commercially viable.

When the next royal patent for porcelain was granted in 1702 to the owners of Saint-Cloud porcelain, the grant noted that the Rouen factory "did nothing more than approach the secret, and never brought it to the perfection these petitioners have acquired".

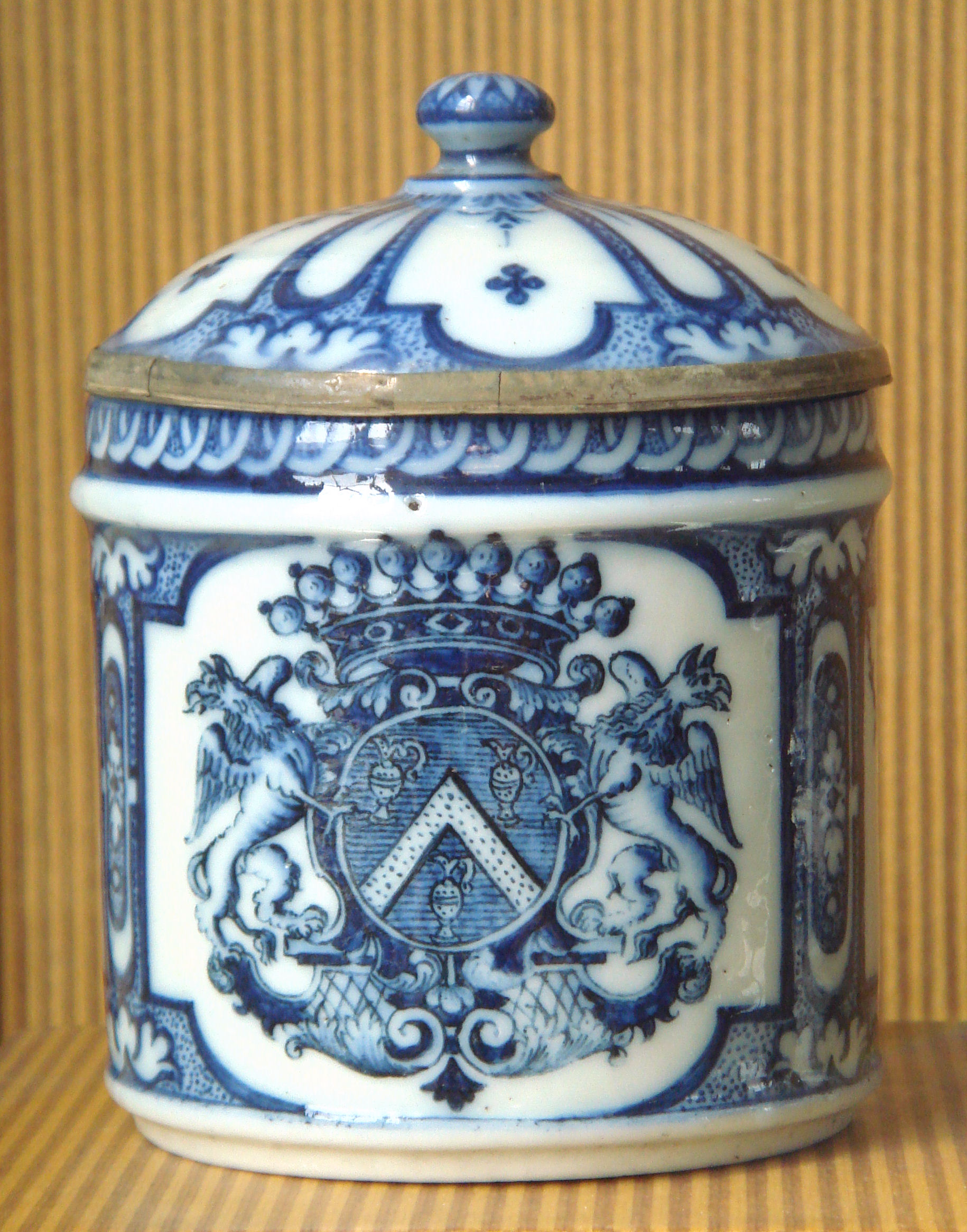
Mustard pot, with the arms of Asselin de Villequiers, Sèvres museum.

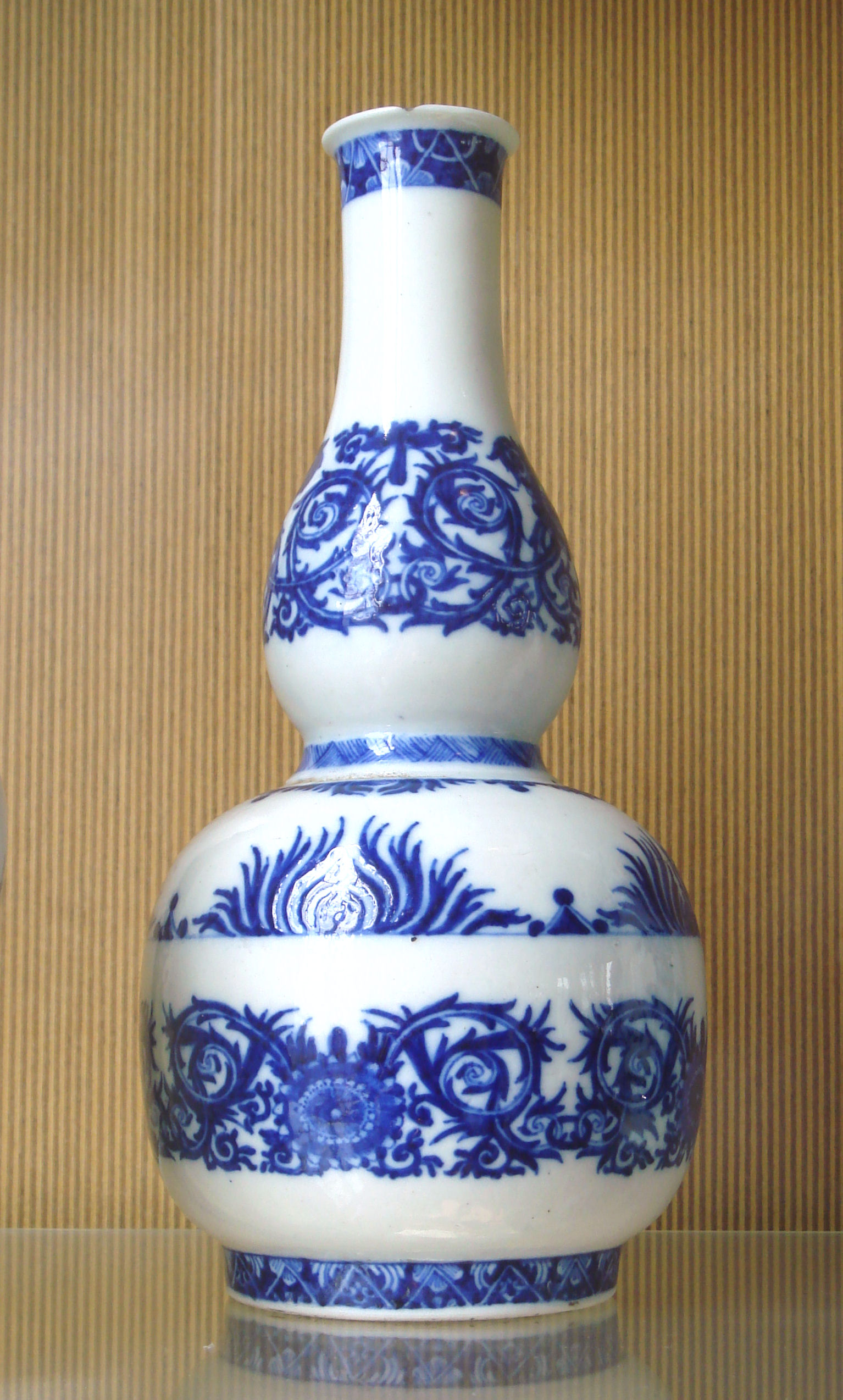
Bottle, Sèvres museum (as are the other pieces with this background).

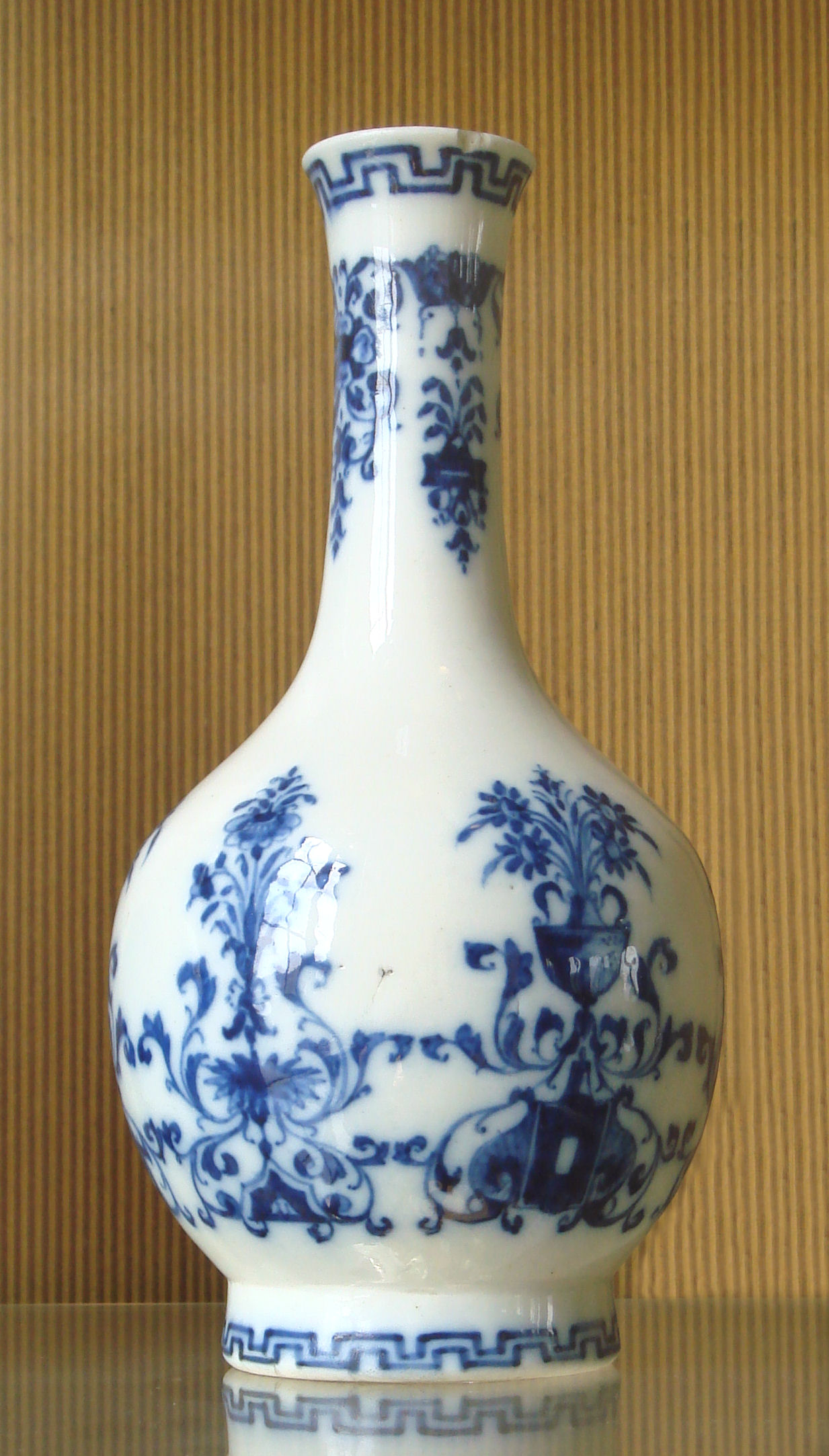
Rouen soft-paste porcelain bottle

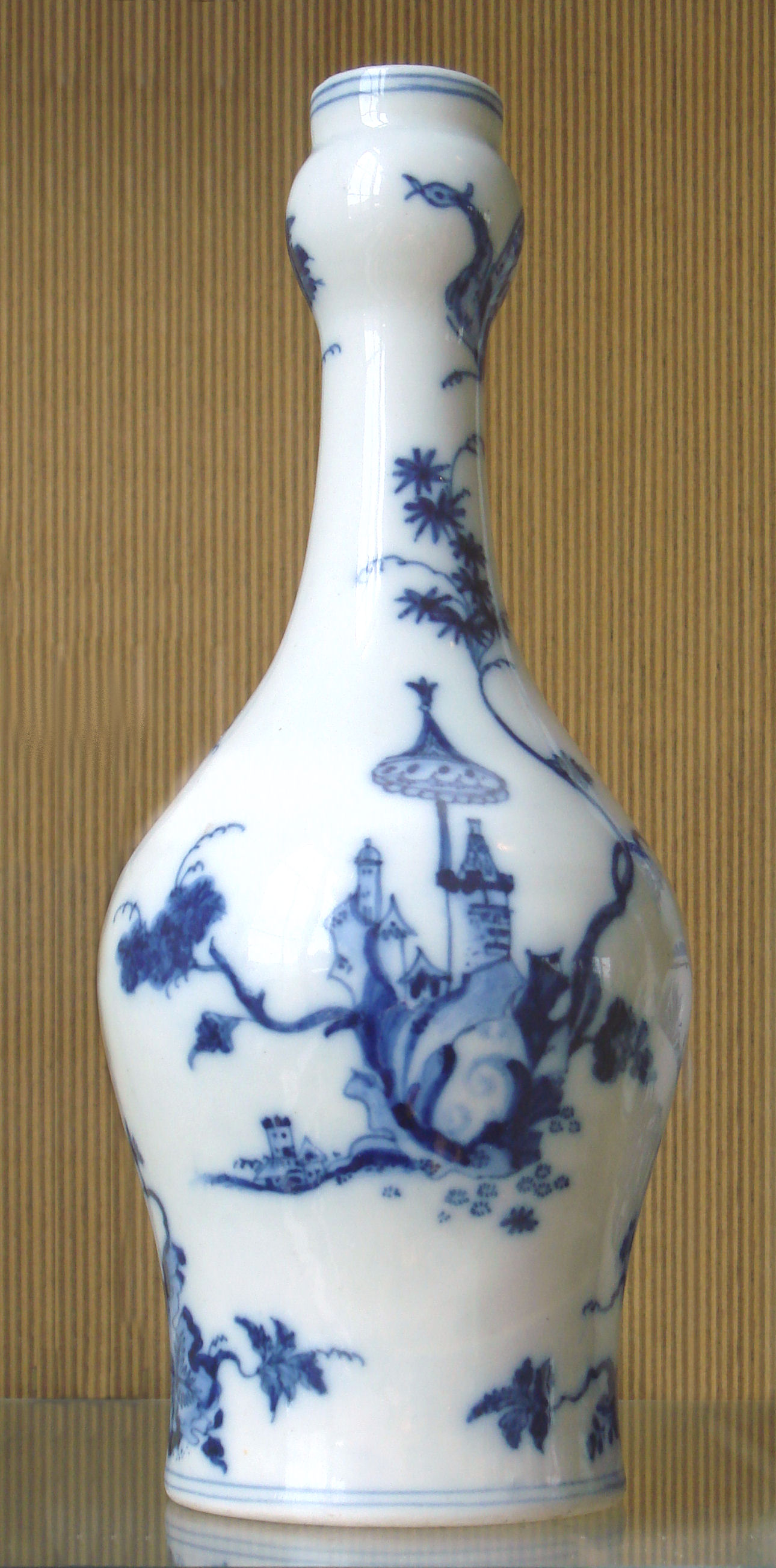
Rouen porcelain bottle
