= Peace of Asti =

1615 peace treaty between Spain and Savoy

The Peace of Asti was signed on 21 June 1615, between representatives of King Philip III of Spain and Charles Emmanuel I, Duke of Savoy. It was a truce during the War of the Montferrat Succession, but the conflict resumed and ended in 1617 with the treaties of Madrid and Pavia.

== See also ==
- List of treaties
- Treaty of Pavia
