= García Álvarez de Toledo y Osorio =

Spanish general and politician (1514–1577)

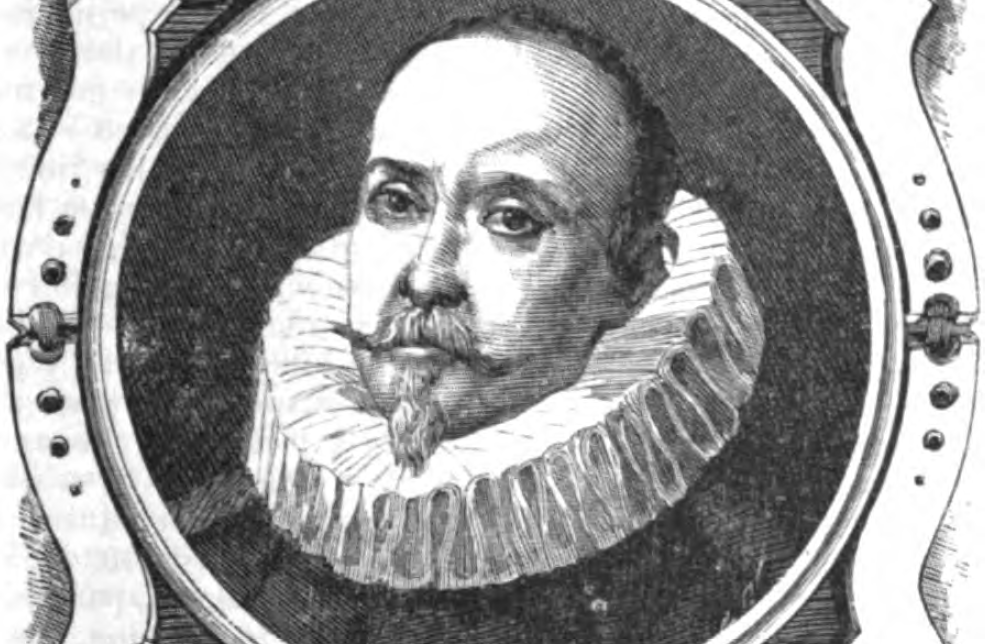
- Tenure: Viceroy of Sicily: 1564-1566 Viceroy of Catalonia: 1558-1664
- Predecessor: Juan de la Cerda y Silva, 4th Duke of Medinaceli
- Successor: Carlo d'Aragona Tagliavia
- Born: 29 August 1514; Villafranca del Bierzo
- Died: 31 May 1577 (aged 62); Naples, Spanish Empire
- Wars and battles: Ottoman–Habsburg wars: Conquest of Tunis; Battle of Preveza; Algiers expedition; Conquest of Mahdia; Conquest of the Peñon de Vélez de la Gomera; Siege of Malta
- Noble family: House of Alvarez de Toledo
- Spouse: Vittoria Colonna
- Issue: Eleonora di Garzia di Toledo Pedro de Toledo Osorio, 5th Marquess of Villafranca
- Father: Pedro de Toledo (viceroy of Naples)
- Mother: Juana Pimentel

García Álvarez de Toledo y Osorio (29 August 1514 – 31 May 1577), was a Spanish admiral and shipbuilder. He was 4th Marquess of Villafranca del Bierzo and 1st Duke of Fernandina, and served under the reigns of Emperor Charles V and King Philip II.

Toledo was a prolific and renowned sea commander, held to be undefeated through his career. He specialized in the study of naval strategy, and organized military, civilian and privateering fleets. Even after his retirement, he remained active in the Spanish navy, helping to craft the battle plan of the Holy League before the Battle of Lepanto.

== Biography ==
Álvarez was born at Villafranca del Bierzo as the son of Pedro Álvarez de Toledo, Marquess of Villafranca, who was Viceroy of Naples between 1532 and 1553. His mother was Juana Pimentel, Marchioness of Villafranca del Bierzo. The Duke of Alba, Fernando Álvarez de Toledo, was his first cousin. Among his many siblings was Eleonora of Toledo, wife of Cosimo I, Grand Duke of Tuscany.

=== First tenure ===
He started his military career under the command of Genoese admiral Andrea Doria in the galleys of Naples, in spite of the deep rivalry between his father and Doria. At 21 he was elected captain of the galley squad of Naples, initially by his later's influence and later validated by his own merits. He served with distinction in the conquest of Tunis in 1535 against Ottoman admiral Hayreddin Barbarossa, sharing the armada with Doria, Álvaro de Bazán the Elder, Bernardino de Mendoza and other admirals. By this point, he had started managing his own fleets, both merchant and military, often from the viceroyalty of Naples.

Toledo was also part of the Christian fleet in the failed Battle of Preveza. Writing about the experience, he extracted the lesson that inadequate morale and wrong decisions could crash even the best armadas. He also studied Barbarossa's tactics during the battle, finding them effective. He later participated in Andrea Doria's North African campaign of 1540, where they captured Monastir, Sousse, Sfax and Kelibia, and also in Emperor Charles V's expedition to Algiers, which was ruined by hostile weather. Later accompanied Doria in the relief of Nice in 1543, where they fought Barbarossa off. Toledo also captured several ships carrying the Ottoman's booty.

Between 1543 and 1545, he organized Christian privateering from Naples against Muslim shipping, and hunted down Ottoman corsairs. In the latter year, he and Antonio Doria chased Dragut, lieutenant to Barbarossa, away from Corsica. Dragut was operating out of Toulon due to the Franco-Ottoman alliance. Shortly after, he joined Mendoza, Giovanni Andrea Doria and Berenguer de Requesens to reinforce La Goulette against Barbarossa's son Hasan Pasha.

His jump to fame came during the conquest of Mahdia, where he projected a floating battery, built by Sicilian engineer Andronico de Spinosa, to bombard the fortress. At the end, Mahdia was taken, repulsing Dragut's attempts to relieve it. Toledo's role brought him praise upon his return to Italy, where he was lauded as "García Africano" by poet Luigi Tansillo following the ancient Roman tradition. He passed his time there inspecting and improving coastal fortifications across Italy.

He participated in the Italian War of 1551–1559, but the death of his father in 1552 left him vulnerable to their rivality with the Doria family. Toledo eventually quit from his job in the Neapolitan squad, citing his dissatisfaction with the increasingly hard logistics of the galley system. He departed from Naples and moved to the theater against the French-aligned Republic of Siena, but obtained little success due to his unfamiliarity with land warfare. He compensated it thanks to his influence of his cousin, Fernando Álvarez de Toledo, Duke of Alba, who became the new Viceroy of Naples.

=== Second tenure ===
Philip II's reorganization of the Spanish navy benefitted Toledo greatly. In 1558 he was appointed Viceroy of Catalonia, the land where Spain's main shipyards were located, thanks to his naval experience. He played an important role developing the local fleet and directing the fight against banditry, Barbary piracy and Protestants. In appreciation of his work, Philip chose home to become Captain-General of the Sea, replacing Giovanni Andrea Doria, who fell out of favor due to the disaster of the Battle of Djerba.

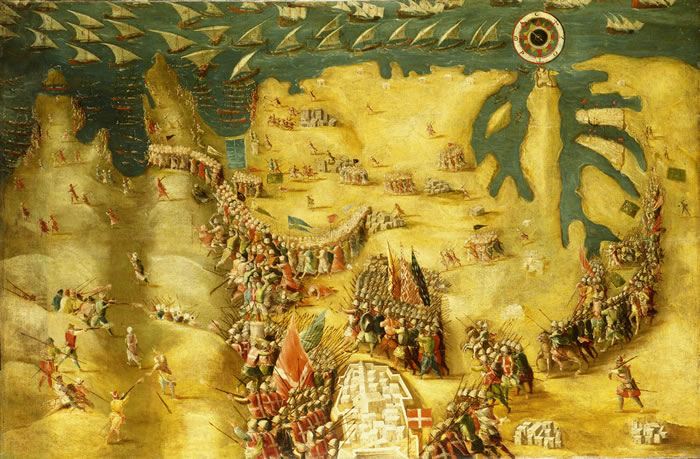
The Siege of Malta - Flight of the Ottomans by Matteo Perez d'Aleccio, showing Don García's relief force battling the retreating Ottomans.

The same year he organized the conquest of Peñón de Vélez de la Gomera, another Ottoman stronghold considered impregnable. Helped by Giovanni Andrea and Álvaro de Bazán the Younger, Toledo personally enforced much of the expedition, to the point of scouting the fortress himself in a skiff and directing land actions while carrying his own gear like a footsoldier. At the end, he achieved the conquest of the peñón by a circle of artillery. Immediately after, he conceived the blockade of the Tetuan River, which Bazán performed in his place. His successes earned him being appointed Viceroy of Sicily, a job he had previously requested. The same year he warned about a probable Ottoman armada against their territories, which ended up materializing as the Great Siege of Malta in 1565.

Toledo visited Malta before the siege to bring reinforces and supplies, including his own illegitimate son, Fadrique, at the head of 800 soldiers. During the siege itself, Toledo was part of the council to deliberate how to solve the situation, and finally authorized Bazán's proposal to directly relieve the island, which translated in an important victory. After the siege, he chased the Ottoman fleet with 50 galleys, hoping to catch them in their most vulnerable, but by them it had disbanded and returned to their bases.

Despite his, his health was falling, worsened by Fadrique's death in the siege, and he eventually asked Philip's to remove him from his jobs. He was replaced by Philip's half-brother John of Austria, although continued serving in the navy with his advice and experience. He was also rewarded with the Duchy of Fernandina and the Princedom of Montalban on December 24, 1569.

He was not in favor of the Holy League of 1571, as his experience in Preveza made him the Republic of Venice was not trustworthy and could be expected to sign peace with the Ottomans at the first chance. Still, he accepted to serve as a consultant to Don John, who requested him to accompany him if it was possible. Toledo advised John, among other specifications, to form in spread eagle formation in the case of a naval battle, adopting the tactc Barbarossa had used in Preveza. The consequent victory in the Battle of Lepanto, where his advice was followed, greatly raised Toledo's spirits, making him believe that even the long desired reconquest of Jerusalem was possible, but the League disbanded shortly after. He died at Naples in 1577.

== Marriage and issue ==
In 1552, in Naples, the Duke married Donna Vittoria Colonna, the daughter of Don Ascanio Colonna, 2nd Duke of Paliano, and Giovanna d'Aragona and the niece of famed poet and diplomat Vittoria Colonna, with whom she shares a name. They had six children:

- Pedro de Toledo Osorio, 5th Marquess of Villafranca and Grandee of Spain;
- María de Toledo, married Fadrique Álvarez de Toledo, 4th Duke of Alba;
- Juana de Toledo, married Bernardino Pimentel, 3rd Marquess of Távara;
- Ana de Toledo, married Gómez Dávila, 3rd Marquess of Velada;
- Inés de Toledo, married Juan Pacheco, 2nd Marquess of Cerralbo.
- Leonor de Toledo, married her cousin Pietro de' Medici, Prince of Tuscany.

He also had two illegitimate children:

- Fadrique Álvarez de Toledo, Señor de Gaipuli;
- Delia de Toledo, a Carmelite nun.

== Ancestry ==
Ancestors of García Álvarez de Toledo y Osorio

García Álvarez de Toledo; 1st Duke of Alba
Fadrique Álvarez de Toledo; 2nd Duke of Alba
María Enriquez
Pedro Álvarez de Toledo; 2nd Marquess of Villafranca
Álvaro de Zuñiga; Duke of Plasencia
Isabel de Zuñiga y Pimentel
Leonor de Pimentel
García Álvarez de Toledo; 4th Marquess of Villafranca
Rodrigo Alonso de Pimentel; Duke of Benavente
Luís de Pimentel; 1st Marquess of Villafranca
María Pacheco
María Osorio; Marchioness of Villafranca
Pedro Álvarez Osorio; Count of Lemos
Juana Osorio y Bazán
María de Bazán

== Bibliography ==
- Anderson, Roger Charles (1952). Naval wars in the Levant, 1559-1853. Princeton University Press.
- Fernández Duro, Cesáreo (1896). Armada Española, desde la unión de los reinos de Castilla y Aragón, tomo II. Madrid: Instituto de Historia Naval.

Government offices
Preceded by The Duke of Alcalá	Viceroy of Catalonia; 1558–1564	Succeeded by The Duke of Francavilla
Preceded by The Duke of Medinaceli	Viceroy of Sicily; 1564–1566	Succeeded by The Duke of Terranova
Spanish nobility
Preceded by Fadrique de Toledo Osorio	Marquess of Villafranca del Bierzo; 1554–1577	Succeeded by Pedro de Toledo Osorio
New title	Duke of Fernandina; 1568–1577	Succeeded by Pedro de Toledo Osorio
