= Uskok War =

17th-century conflict in Europe

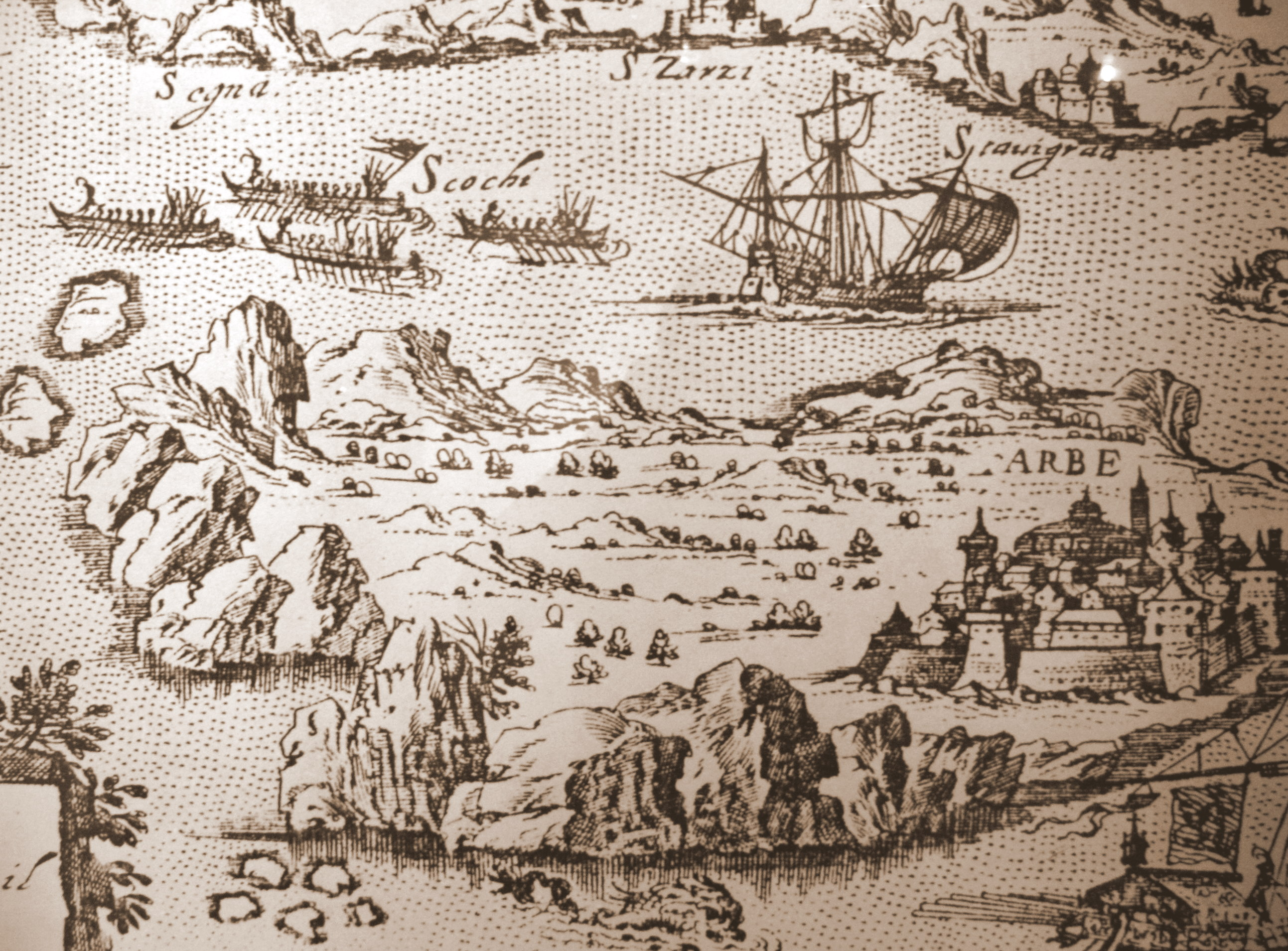
- The Uskok in the Senjer Canal
Date	December 1615 – 26 September 1617
Location	Northern shores of the Adriatic Sea
Result	Treaty of Madrid (1617)

Belligerents
Republic of Venice; Duchy of Savoy; Dutch Republic; Kingdom of England; Ottoman Empire (Note: The inhabitants of Bosnia supported the Venetians)	Holy Roman Empire (Spanish Empire) Habsburg Spain; Habsburg monarchy Kingdom of Croatia

Commanders and leaders
(Republic of Venice) Giovanni Bembo; (Republic of Venice) Pompeo Giustiniani; (Republic of Venice) Don Giovanni de' Medici; (Republic of Venice) (Dutch Republic) Johan Ernest	(Holy Roman Empire) Archduke Ferdinand; (Holy Roman Empire) Albrecht von Wallenstein; (Holy Roman Empire) Adam von Trautmannsdorf; (Spanish Empire) Pedro Girón; (Spanish Empire) Baltasar Marradas; Vuk Frankopan

The Uskok War, also known as the War of Gradisca or the War of Friuli, was fought by the Austrians, Slovenes, Croats (from Croatia and Slavonia) and Spanish on one side and the Venetians, Croats (from Dalmatia and Istria), Slovenes (from Istria), Dutch, and English on the other. It is named for the Uskoks, soldiers from Croatia used by the Austrians for irregular warfare.

Since the Uskoks were checked on land and were rarely paid their annual salary, they resorted to piracy. In addition to attacking Turkish ships, they attacked Venetian merchantmen. Although the Venetians tried to protect their shipping with escorts, watchtowers, and other protective measures, the cost became prohibitive: 120,000 thalers annually during the 1590s, 200,000 in the 1600s, and 360,000 by 1615. In December 1615 Venetian troops besieged Gradisca, on the Isonzo River.

The Venetians launched a diplomatic campaign for allies, since the Uskoks were vassals of Archduke Ferdinand of Inner Austria (who was likely to seek help from the Holy Roman Emperor Matthias, his uncle and King Philip III of Spain, his brother-in-law). In September 1616, Count John Ernest of Nassau-Siegen agreed to raise 3,000 men in the Dutch Republic for Venetian service. They arrived in May 1617, followed six months later by another 2,000 with a contingent of English volunteers. Spanish support was blocked at sea by a flotilla of 12 Dutch and 10 English warships, and on land by the concurrent war at Mantua.

== Beginning ==
The conflict began in January 1616 in the Gorizia Hills, where a garrison of Uskok and Segnani supported the Austrian faction. After the Venetian faction gained the advantage in Mariano, they advanced to Gradisca d'Isonzo on 24 February 1616 and camped in Farra.

The Venetian Republic, powerful at sea, was master of the Adriatic; Austria had a small part of the coast of Trieste and Croatia which was blocked by Venice. No vessel could pass this border without paying taxes or having a Venetian residence. In January 1616, the Gorizia Hills (Collio) were guarded by Uskoks and Segnani in Vipolže and Šmartno. A Venetian detachment remained in the field of Mariano. Romans and Medeans, camped near Farra, advanced on 24 February 1616 towards Gradisca. The siege lasted for twenty-nine days. The Venetian fleet crashed in Trieste, whose garrison was reinforced by Captain Sebastian Zuech. With 1,000 cavalry and infantry, Benedict Lezze occupied the Venetian castle of San Servolo. Uskok troops led by Vuk Frankopan (Wolfgang Frangipane), the Count of Tržac and vice-general of Croatia, arrived in Monfalcone on 26 November 1615 and plundered the town.

== First siege of Gradisca ==
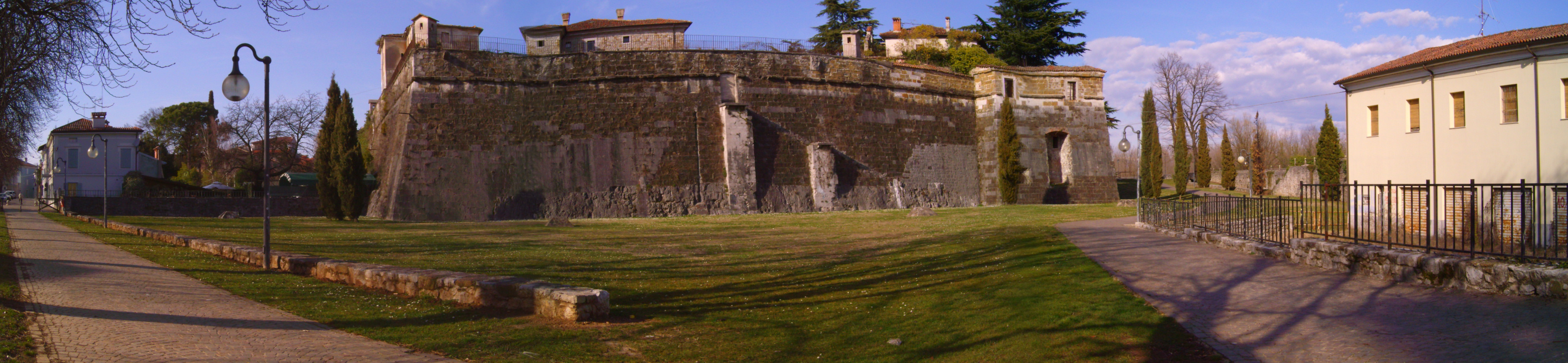
Gradisca Castle

In 1616 the Venetians besieged Farra and Gradisca, and the archduke attacked from Gorizia and Lucinico. With three large culverins, four guns, and three small culverins, Farra (despite damage to its buildings) repulsed the enemy artillery with heavy losses. The Venetians launched another futile assault before Giustiniani lifted the siege and retreated to Mariano.

In September, John Ernest of Nassau-Siegen agreed to raise 3,000 men from the Dutch Republic for Venetian service. They arrived in May 1617, followed six months later by another 2,000 (including a contingent of English volunteers). Spanish support was blocked at sea by a flotilla of 12 Dutch and 10 English warships and on land by the war in Mantua. Although Archduke Ferdinand had only 4,000 soldiers to defend Gradisca, he received military, political, and financial support from the Spanish as part of a larger agreement: Philip agreed to fight the Venetians and support Ferdinand as the next Holy Roman Emperor in return for the cession of Alsace, Finale Ligure, and Piombino. This led to a negotiated settlement between Ferdinand and the Venetians in which many Uskoks were executed or exiled, and a permanent Austrian garrison was installed in Senj.

== Second siege of Gradisca ==
Count John Ernest of Nassau-Siegen landed in Monfalcone with 4,000 Dutch mercenaries, increasing the Venetian forces to 20,000 men; English soldiers also arrived. At dawn on 2 June the Dutch occupied San Martino del Carso, and the Austrians abandoned their positions between Gradisca and the plateau to the Venetians. With a thousand men, Camillo Trevigliano engaged the Austrians in Gorizia. Six galleys attacked Duino Castle.

On 5 June, the 400 men at Fort Imperial surrendered to the Dutch in exchange for free passage. The Venetians built several small reduits, placing forty pieces and preparing a final assault on Rubbia (the Austrian headquarters). Although civilians began evacuating Gorizia, on 6 June Henry of Nassau refused to continue the assault due to the fatigue of his men.

The Venetians refrained from further offensives, intensifying the blockade of Gradisca; disease halved the Dutch forces. Austrian Giovanni de Medici left his command for health reasons, and was replaced by Prince Luigi d'Este. Although the Venetians surrounded Fort Stella, Albrecht von Wallenstein brought in reinforcements and supplies. He used his wealth, offering and commanding 200 horses for Archduke Ferdinand of Styria for the war and relieving the fortress of Gradisca from the Venetian siege.

To block Austrian supplies from the valley, the Venetians considered occupying Sdraussina and Fogliano (south of Gradisca). Although the occupation was planned in detail by Don Giovanni de' Medici on 25 August 1617, it was not carried on because it was considered too dangerous and relief to the fort from the plateau continued.

== Peace ==
In the face of ongoing hostilities, there was a yearning for peace on both sides. In anticipation of problems in Germany, Ferdinand wanted to break away from the commitment of the war with Venice. In any case, Venice was also uncommitted to the war, largely due to fear of direct Spanish intervention.

On 6 November, a truce was signed. On 28 November, six days after the Spanish and Venetian armadas directly collided in the Battle of Ragusa, demobilisation began. However, peace talks were prolonged and the Netherlands continued to recruit soldiers.
