= Medici porcelain =

Manufacturers of soft-paste porcelain in Florence, Italy

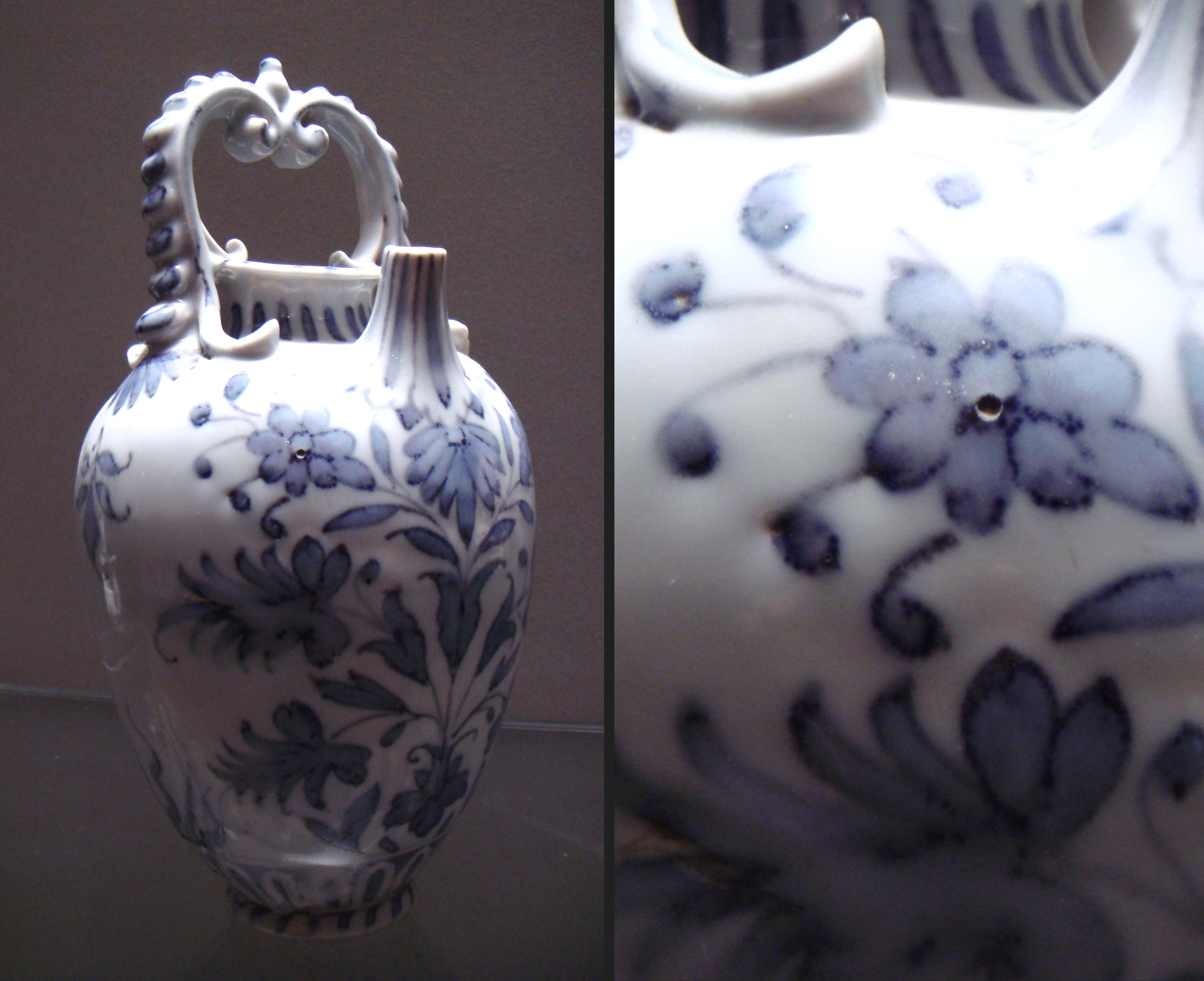
Medici Porcelain Works, Bottle, c. 1575–87, with pitted texture detail; Soft Paste Porcelain; OA 2734, Louvre, Paris.

Medici porcelain was the first successful attempt in Europe to make imitations of Chinese porcelain, though it was soft-paste porcelain rather than the hard-paste made in Asia. The experimental manufactory housed in the Casino of San Marco in Florence existed between 1575 and 1587 under the patronage of Francesco I de' Medici, Grand Duke of Tuscany. Surviving examples are extremely rare, numbering 59 according to the Metropolitan Museum of Art.

A painted mark of Brunelleschi's dome and a capital letter F appear on the underside of some pieces; others bear the Medici palle, the balls that are the Medici heraldic charge. Never a commercial venture, Medici porcelains were sometimes given as diplomatic gifts; for example, surviving pieces bear the arms of Philip II of Spain.

In 1995, a vase dated to around 1575, was sold in Paris for FRF6,430,000 (at the time equivalent to £870,000). In 1999, a cruet dated circa 1575 was auctioned at Christie's for £287,000.

== History and manufacture ==
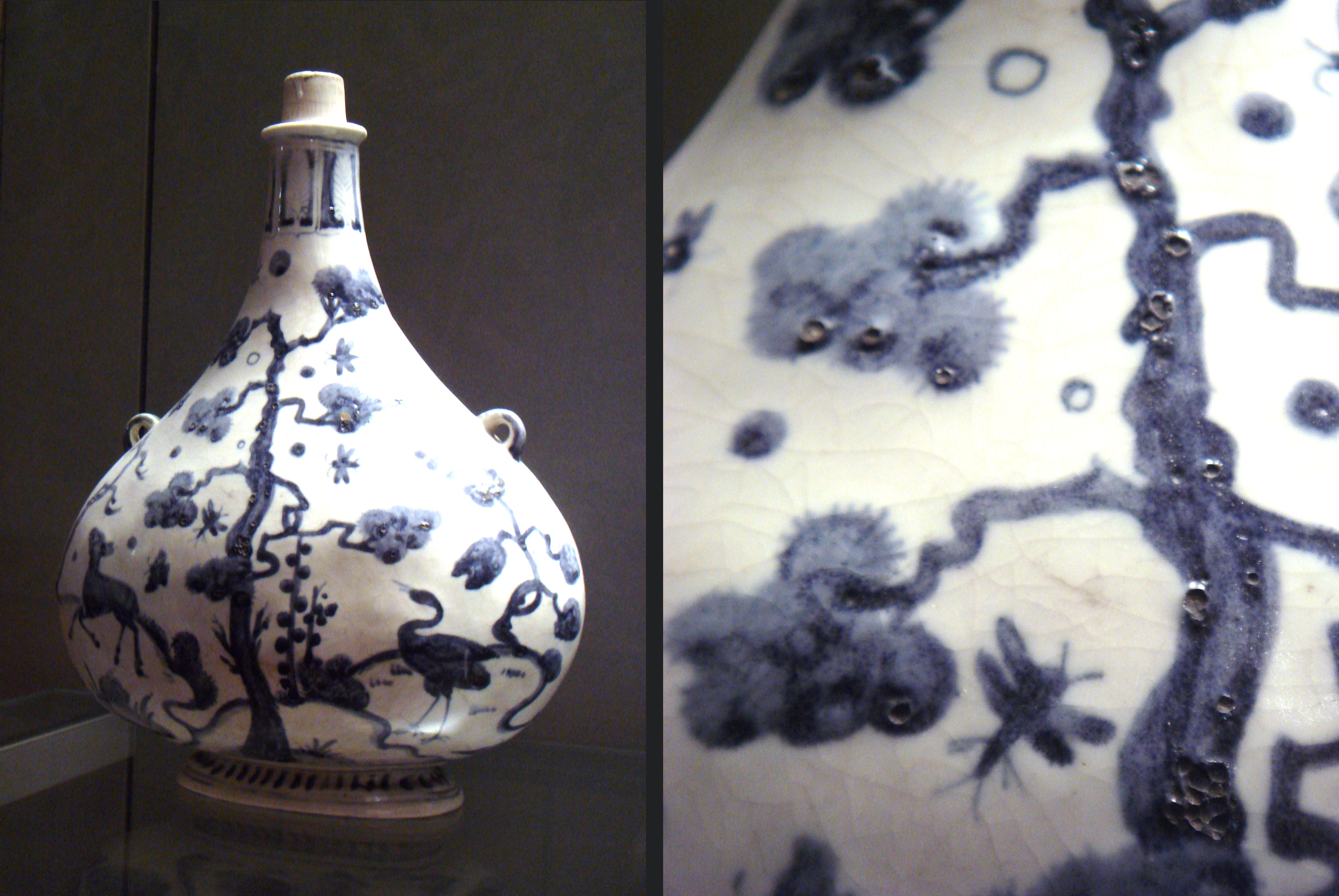
Medici porcelain gourd, with pitted texture detail, 1575–1587.

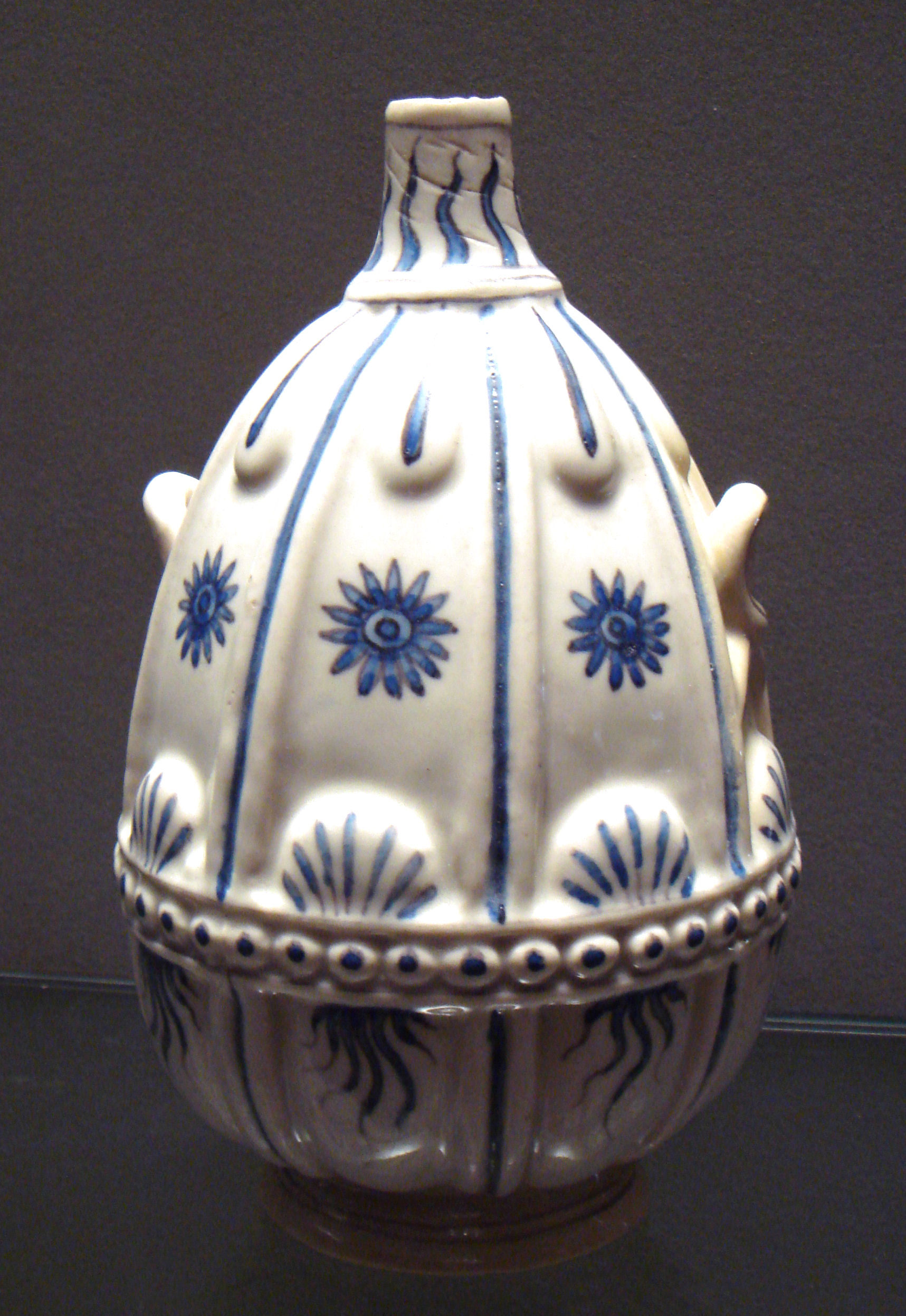
Medici porcelain vase, 1575–1587.

Giorgio Vasari reported in the 1568 edition of his Vite that Bernardo Buontalenti was currently at work on discovering the art of porcelain, but there is no sign that he was successful. The first successes were finally reported in 1575 by the Venetian ambassador Andrea Gussoni, who mentioned in his brief to the Serenissima that Francesco discovered the means of making "the porcelain of India," (i.e. the East Indies). Gussoni mentioned in particular the four qualities that made porcelain desirable, apart from its exotic rarity:

its transparency, hardness, lightness and delicacy; it has taken him ten years to discover the secret, but a Levantine showed him the way to success.

However, the entire project was ultimately relatively short-lived; the high-firing temperature pushed sixteenth century technical capability to its limit, resulting in exorbitant production costs. There are no references to Medici porcelain manufacture securely dated after Francesco's death in 1587.

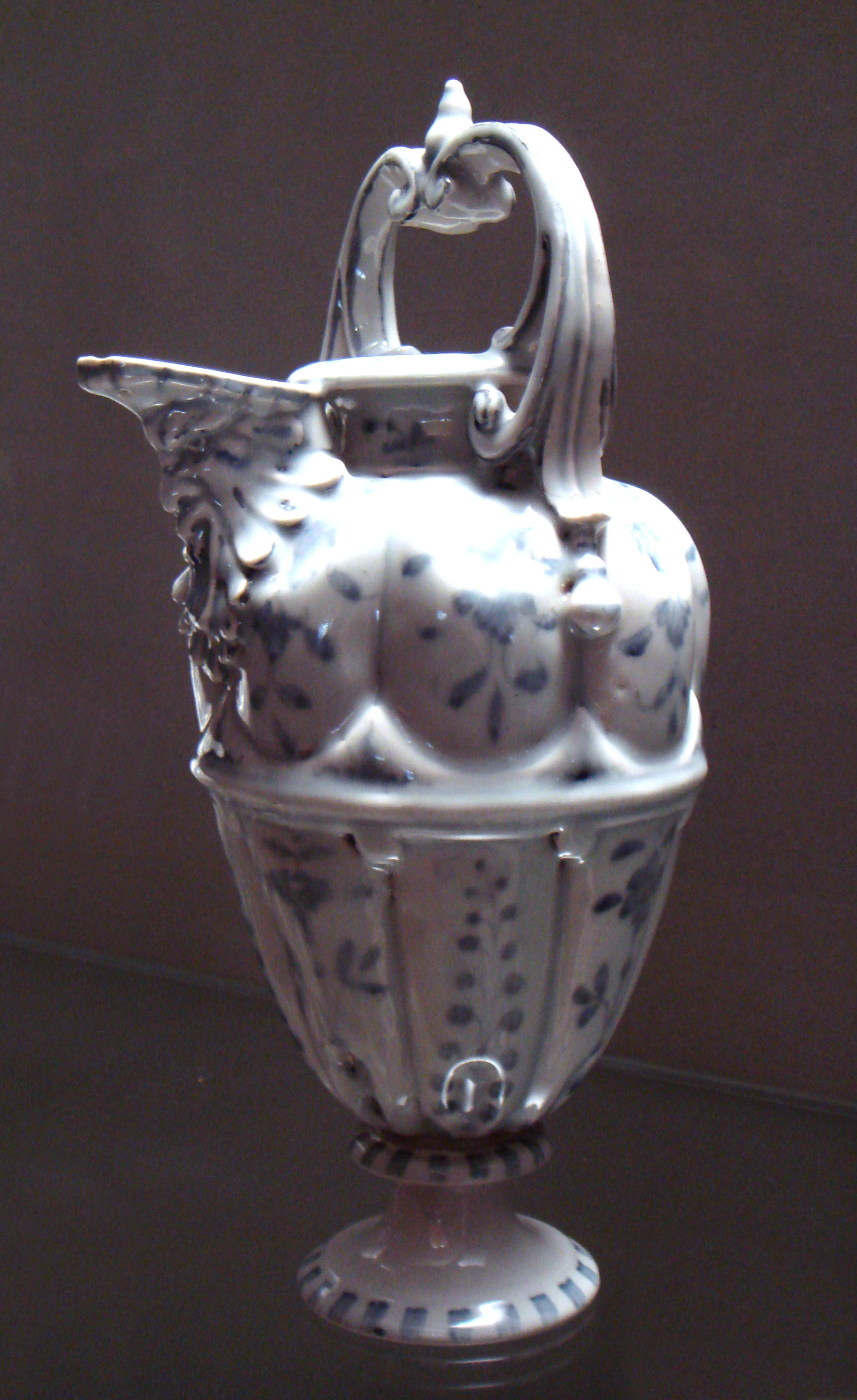
Medici porcelain ewer, 1575–1587.

The Victoria and Albert Museum describes is as "Fritware made with white Vicenza clay and ground rock crystal with painted floral decoration in blue under a layer of transparent lead-glaze." Analysis using Raman spectroscopy at the Sèvres – Cité de la céramique, which holds 10 examples, on two examples identified in the body: anatase, α-quartz, cassiterite, feldspar, α-wollastonite and β-wollastonite in the body. Whilst identified in the glaze were: calcium silicate, calcium phosphate and either spinel or ilmenite.

Following the precedents of classic Chinese blue and white porcelain, decorations were painted in underglaze blue, which resulted in a range of hues when fired; from a bright cobalt blue (such as a flask in the National Gallery of Art) to grey (such as the bottle detail at right). Some pieces have outlines traced in manganese.

Body shapes are adapted from maiolica ceramics and silver models; they range from the largest basins and ewers, chargers and plates, to the smallest cruets. Decorative motifs are executed in imitation of Chinese blue-and-white wares, or of Turkish İznik ceramics, or more rarely in imitation of maiolica grottesche ornament. Both Chinese and Turkish ceramics had been represented in the Medici family collections for over a century; for example, one prized possession of the family was a gift from the Mamluk Sultan of Egypt who sent Lorenzo de' Medici "large vessels of porcelain, the like of which has never been seen" in 1478.

== Legacy ==
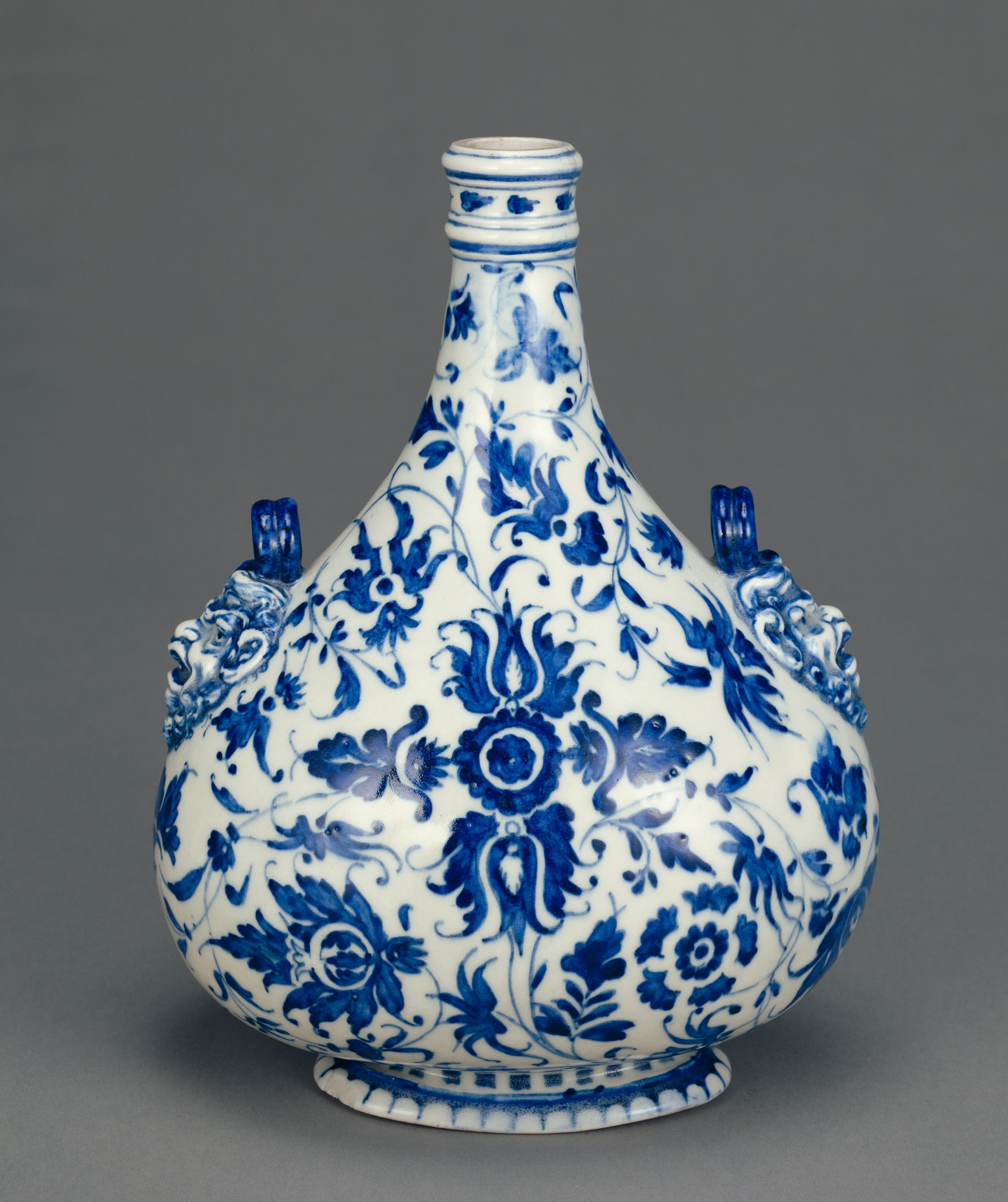
Pilgrim flask, 1580s. J. Paul Getty Museum

When Francesco died, his younger brother Cardinal Ferdinando de' Medici inherited the position of Grand Duke. Ferdinando brought his prized Chinese and Medici porcelains back with him to Florence from the Villa Medici in Rome, along with his paintings and treasured Roman antiquities. But with the ubiquity of European soft-paste and hard-paste porcelains in the eighteenth century, the Medici heirs in the House of Lorraine came to value less and less the imperfect Medici porcelains, with their minute firing cracks and bubbled glazes. In 1772 an auction in the Palazzo Vecchio of objects from storage dispersed the Medici porcelains conserved in Tuscany. The venture disappeared from history until interest revived after the mid-nineteenth century. The 1588 inventory drawn up after Francesco's death listed 310 pieces. Today only some sixty or seventy pieces are known to survive.

The next known European soft-paste porcelain was Rouen porcelain in France, in 1673.
