= Pietro de' Medici =

Tuscan noble (1554–1604)

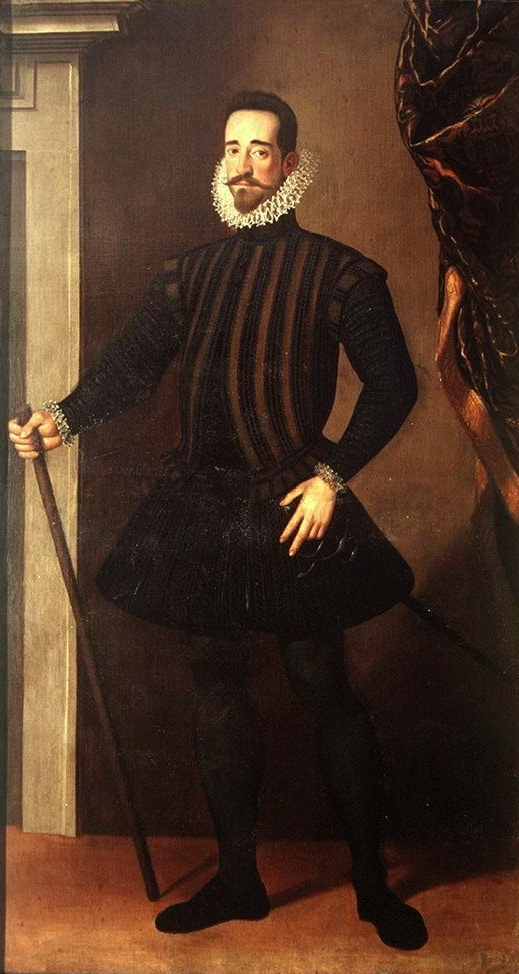
- Portrait by Santi di Tito, c. 1584–1586
- Born: 3 June 1554
- Died: 25 April 1604 (aged 49)
- Spouse: Eleonora di Garzia di Toledo; Dona Beatriz de Lara
- House: Medici
- Father: Cosimo I de' Medici, Grand Duke of Tuscany
- Mother: Eleanor of Toledo

Pietro de' Medici (Italian: Pietro de Medici; 3 June 1554 – 25 April 1604) was a Tuscan prince of the House of Medici as the son of Cosimo I de' Medici, Grand Duke of Tuscany, and a knight of the Order of the Golden Fleece.

Pietro de' Medici was known for his turbulent lifestyle. He ended the life of his first wife Eleonora di Garzia di Toledo and their infant son on suspicion of adultery and false paternity. He was also in constant conflict with his elder brother, Francesco I de' Medici, Grand Duke of Tuscany, over their father's inheritance. He spent most of his life at the courts of the Spanish kings Philip II and Philip III and fought for the Spanish on multiple occasions. Towards the end of his life, he became one of the highest representatives of the Spanish aristocracy. Upon his death, he left behind debts and illegitimate children.

== Biography ==
=== Early life ===
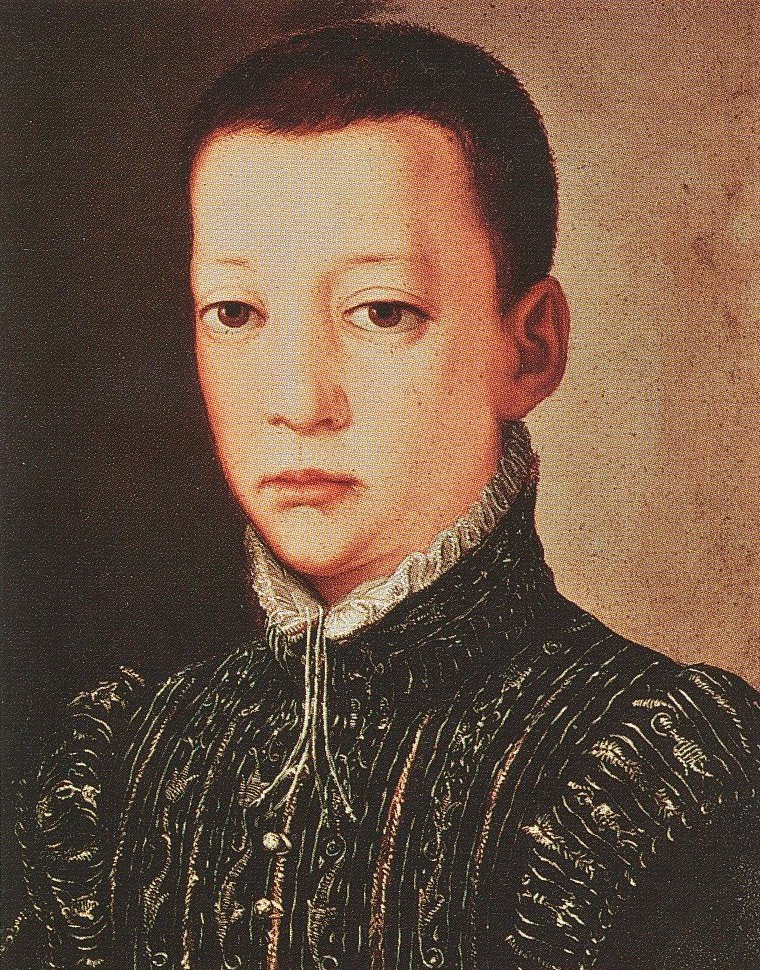
Portrait by Angolo Bronzino, 1560s, Uffizi, Florence

Pietro was born in Florence on June 3, 1554. He was the eleventh and youngest child and seventh son of Cosimo I de' Medici, Duke of Florence, later Grand Duke of Tuscany, and Eleanor of Toledo His father was the son of the famous condottiere Giovanni delle Bande Nere and Maria Salviati, granddaughter of Lorenzo the Magnificent. His mother was the daughter of the Viceroy of Naples Pedro the Great and Maria Osorio y Pimentel, Marchioness of Villafranca.

Pietro was a favorite of his father and enjoyed impunity. He was ill-tempered and grew up a spendthrift.

While still a teenager, the prince began to be trained for a military career. His teacher and mentor in the art of war was Cesare Cavaniglia, admiral of the Knights of the Order of St. Stephen. In 1573, his father appointed Pietro commander-in-chief of the fleet of the Grand Duchy of Tuscany. He was then given Lieutenant Simone Rossermini as his assistant.

In April 1574, Pietro was supposed to meet Don John of Austria in Genoa, but due to the death of his father on April of that year, the diplomatic trip had to be cancelled. In the spring of 1575, he was sent to Venice to fetch Bianca Capello, the soon-to-be mistress of his elder brother Francesco, the new Grand Duke of Tuscany. This trip was the prince's first diplomatic mission.

=== Marriage ===
In April 1571, Pietro was married, against his will, to his cousin, Eleonora di Garzia di Toledo, daughter of García Alvarez de Toledo, his maternal uncle. The marriage was unsuccessful; the prince neglected his wife, preferring the company of courtesans. Eleonora bore him one son, the only child of this marriage. The princess was also unfaithful to her husband and had an affair with Bernardo Antinori, a member of a Florentine patrician family and a poet and knight of the Knights of the Order of St. Stephen, as well as a hero of the Battle of Lepanto.

Upon learning of the affair, Pietro accused Eleonora of adultery and, in a fit of rage, strangled her to death at the Villa di Cafaggiolo on July 11, 1576. Immediately after killing his wife, he confessed everything in a letter to his elder brother, Grand Duke Francesco I. It was officially announced that the princess had suffocated in bed from a heart attack. Her lover was imprisoned and was soon also murdered in his cell. Eleonora was a grandee, so the Spanish nobility, outraged by her lack of due honors, demanded an explanation. The Grand Duke was forced to confess the crime in a letter to King Philip II. He admitted that Eleonora was killed by her husband for her infidelity, evidence of which was the poems dedicated to her by her lover, describing in detail the beauty of the princess's body, which were discovered in the leg of her chair.

=== Military and diplomatic career ===
Pietro's relationship with his older brothers was complicated. Francesco I, wishing to rid himself of Pietro's presence at the grand ducal court, decided to send him to the Kingdom of Spain. In 1577, he sent his personal secretary, Antonio Serguidi, to Madrid to inform Philip II in detail about the reasons for the murder of the Grand Duke's daughter-in-law and asked the monarch to take Pietro under his personal protection. The king gave his consent, and in 1578 Pietro departed for the court in Madrid, where he arrived on April 17 of that year and remained until November. The Kingdom of Spain was interested in closer cooperation with the Grand Duchy of Tuscany. In Madrid, the prince served as the official representative of Florence. On April 14, 1578, Pietro was invited to the christening of King Philip II's newborn son, the future Philip III of Spain.

In 1579, Pietro returned to Tuscany. Soon, Francesco I sent him back to Spain, placing him as a general in charge of a detachment of infantry, which he sent to Philip II along with a substantial loan. This time, Pietro was accompanied by Colonel Luigi Dovara, who instructed him on how to conduct himself at the court in Madrid to avoid incidents. A year later, as a lieutenant in the same infantry, the prince participated in the occupation of the Kingdom of Portugal under the command of Fernando Álvarez de Toledo, 3rd Duke of Alba. He remained in Lisbon until the end of 1582, then returned to Madrid. During his service in Spain, the king granted him the title of Don.

In 1584, Pietro departed for Florence with the rank of permanent general of the infantry. In April 1585, he was sent to Rome as ambassador to the new Pope, Sixtus V. From Rome, he went back to Madrid, but in 1588 he returned to Florence for the coronation of his other other brother, now Grand Duke Ferdinando I de' Medici. That same year, he became the first patron of the Accademia della Crusca in Florence. Pietro led the embassy sent by the Grand Duke to his fiancée, Princess Christina of Lorraine. In April 1589, a small fleet under his command brought the princess from Marseille to Livorno. However, relations between him and Ferdinando soon deteriorated again. The cause was Pietro's lifestyle, his passion for gambling and extravagance, which resulted in large debts. The brothers could not agree on the division of their father's inheritance, and, despite the Grand Duke's prohibition, Pietro left for Madrid.

In the dispute over the inheritance, Pietro turned for support first to King Philip II, then to Pope Clement VIII, and finally to the new Spanish King Philip III. While Philip II attempted to exert pressure on the foreign policy of the Grand Duke of Tuscany through the prince, during the reign of Philip III, relations between the two states became stable, and the court in Madrid lost interest in the inheritance dispute. In 1596, through the mediation of Clement VIII, the Grand Duke agreed to pay his younger brother a monthly allowance of 1,000 scudi. Ferdinando I subsequently paid Pietro's debts on numerous occasions. The last conflict between the brothers over this issue occurred in 1602.

=== Later life ===
Pietro spent his last years at the court in Madrid. On November 29, 1593, the king awarded the prince the Order of the Golden Fleece. That same year, again against the wishes of his elder brother, Pietro married the Portuguese aristocrat Beatriz de Lara de Menezes, daughter of Manuel IV, Marquis of Villarreal. After the wedding, he left his wife and settled in a house with courtesans, one of whom bore him five children. The prince justified his behavior by saying that, having not received his father's inheritance, he could not adequately support his wife. In 1596, Philip II removed him from court for his lifestyle and sent him to Rome. But here, too, Pietro was soon shown the undesirability of his presence, and he was forced to return to Madrid.

Under King Philip III, the prince's position at the court in Madrid was consolidated. He accompanied the new king on his ceremonial entry into Madrid on 26 October 1599. At court, Pietro maintained friendly relations with the royal adviser Don Juan Manrique de Lara y Acuña, Duke of Nájera, and Pedro Enríquez de Acevedo, Count of Fuentes. When the court moved to Valladolid in 1601, the prince remained in Madrid, but at the invitation of the royal favorite and prime minister Francisco Gómez de Sandoval y Rojas, Duke of Lerma, he participated in all the important events of court life.

Pietro died in Madrid on April 25, 1604, leaving behind debts that were paid by Ferdinando I. By order of the Grand Duke, the prince's secretary, Rutillo Gaci, destroyed all his papers. Pietro's remains were buried in the Church of the Holy Trinity in Madrid, from where they were transported to Florence and buried in the Medici Chapel in Florence.

== Marriages and issue ==
His first marriage to Eleonora di Garzia di Toledo, Pietro de' Medici had an only son, Cosimo de' Medici (10 February 1573 – 1576), known as "Cosimino" in the family. He died a month after his mother's murder. According to rumors, the infant was poisoned on the orders of Pietro, who doubted his paternity. His second marriage was childless.

By his mistress Antonia Caravajal, he had two more sons—Cosimo (1577–1644) and Pietro (1592–1654), governor of Livorno, ambassador to Milan from 1629 and Genoa from 1630, and captain-general of cavalry from 1637—and three daughters: Catalina Maria, Giovanna, and Eleonora (born in 1592); all three became nuns. By his mistress Maria della Ribera, he had an only son, Cosimo (1588–1610). All of Pietro's illegitimate children were brought to Florence by order of Ferdinando I and taken into the care of the family, but excluded from the line of succession to the throne.
