= Pedro de Toledo Osorio, 5th Marquess of Villafranca =

Spanish-Italian nobleman

Cavalry general Pedro de Toledo Osorio 5th Marquis of Villafranca del Bierzo 2nd Duke of Fernandina 2nd Prince of Montalbán 5th Count of Peña Ramiro
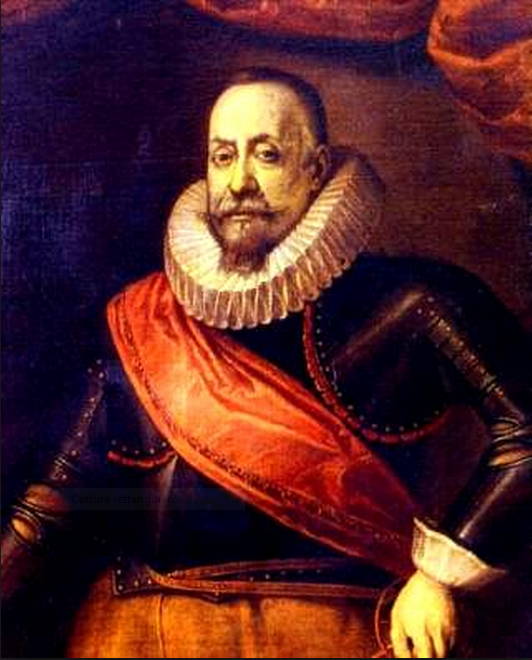
- Portrait of Pedro de Toledo Osorio y Colonn
- Born: Pedro de Toledo Osorio y Colonna; 27 December 1557; Naples, Kingdom of Naples, Spanish Empire
- Died: 17 July 1627 (aged 69); Madrid, Crown of Castile, Spanish Empire
- Spouse(s): Elvira de Mendoza; Giovanna Pignatelli
- Children: Victoria Álvarez de Toledo Osorio; García de Toledo Osorio; Fadrique de Toledo Osorio; María Álvarez de Toledo Osorio
- Relatives: García Álvarez de Toledo y Osorio (father); Vittoria Colonna di Paliano (mother); Ascanio I Colonna (grandfather); Juana de Aragón (grandmmother); Iñigo López de Mendoza y Mendoza (father of Elvira; father-in-law); María de Mendoza (mother of Elvira; mother-in-law); Camillo Pignatelli (father of Giovanna; father-in-law); Girolama Colonna (mother of Giovanna; mother-in-law); Vittoria Colonna (great-grandmother)
- Military career
- Allegiance: Spanish Empire
- Branch: (Spanish Empire) Spanish Army
- Service years: 1585–1618
- Rank: Cavalry general
- Conflicts: War of the Montferrat Succession

Governor of the Duchy of Milan
- In office 26 September 1615 – 13 February 1618
- Monarch: Philip III
- Valido: Duke of Lerma
- Preceded by: Juan de Mendoza
- Succeeded by: Gómez Suárez de Figueroa

Pedro de Toledo Osorio y Colonna or Pedro Álvarez de Toledo Osorio, 5th Marquess of Villafranca del Bierzo, (Naples, 6 September 1546 – 17 July 1627), Governor of the Duchy of Milan, 1616–1618, Prince of Montalbano, 2nd Duke of Fernandina was a Spanish-Italian nobleman and a Grandee of Spain.

He had a long and successful career as an admiral by influence of his father García de Toledo. He was later he was appointed governor of Milan, where he exercised his post with great political aggression. Toledo pushed for interventions in the War of the Montferrat Succession and might have been involved in the Bedmar Conspiracy. He relocated to Spain, where he served until his death.

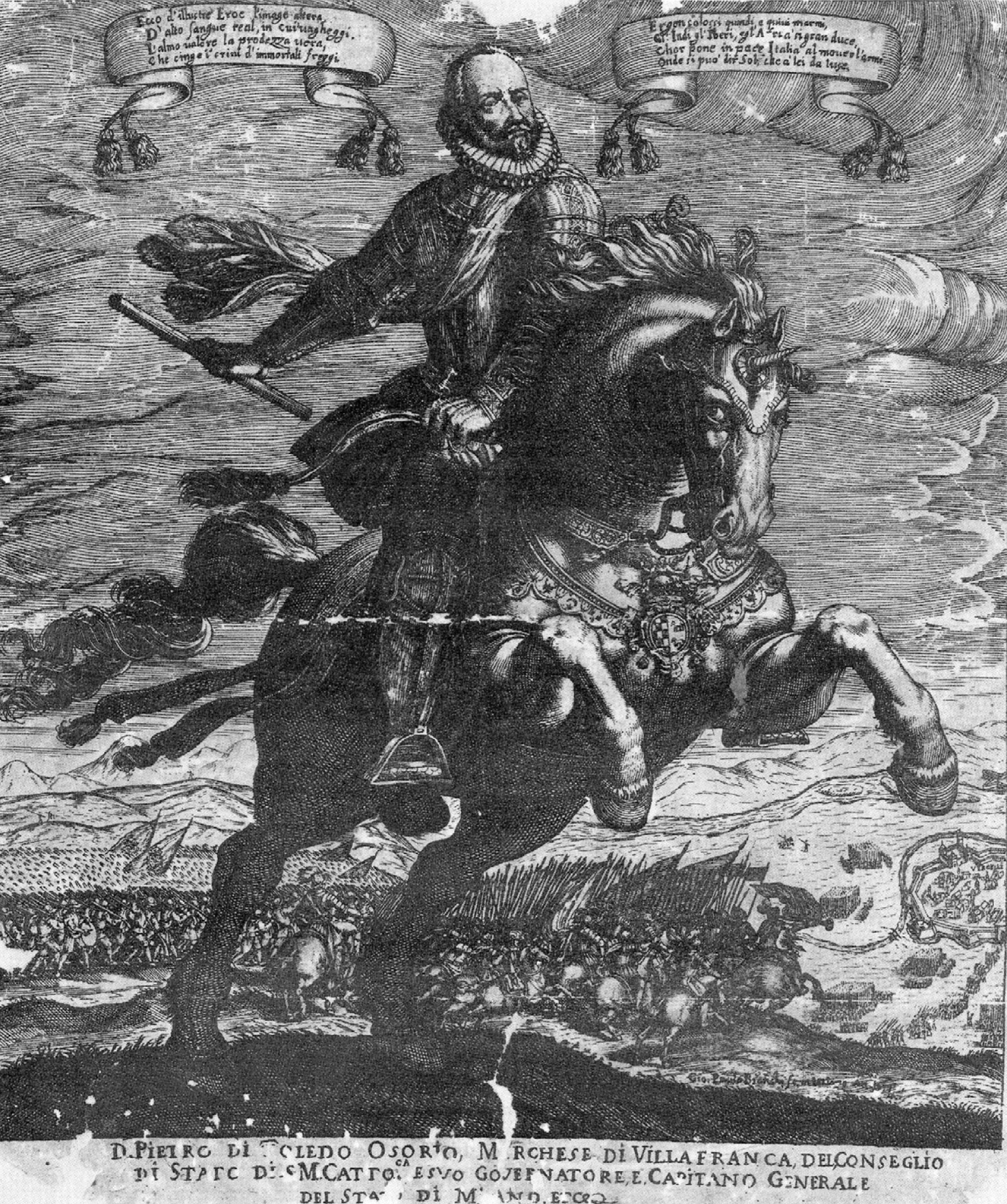
Portrait of Pedro de Toledo Osorio y Colonn, 1629

== Biography ==
He was the son of García de Toledo Osorio, 4th Marquess of Villafranca, and Vittoria Colonna di Paliano. His mother was the niece of Vittoria Colonna.

In June 1585 Pedro was appointed captain general of the galleys of the Kingdom of Naples and fought the Ottoman corsairs in the Mediterranean Sea. On 14 July 1607, Philip II entrusted him with command of all the galleys of Spain. In 1608, he was sent to Paris as Ambassador extraordinary to France to seal a pact with King Henry IV of France, which failed.

The expulsion of the Spanish moriscos since 1610 increased the Ottoman naval attacks in the West Mediterranean, especially when young Ahmed I became Sultan. Pedro Alvarez set up an extensive defensive engineering program, with Italian engineers working in Italy, Spain and the Caribbean in America.

Between 1616 and 1618, he was Governor of the Duchy of Milan, where he led the Spanish Army in the second phase of the War of the Montferrat Succession against Savoy and France. He was purported to be part of the Bedmar Conspiracy along with his reluctant ally Pedro Téllez-Girón, Duke of Osuna.

After this, he was Commander in chief of an army in Naples, General of Cavalry of Spain in 1621. His success in Milan was awarded with the honorable Grandeza de España title in 1623. In 1625 he participated in the successful Defense of Cadiz against the attacks from the Anglo-Dutch fleet under the command of Sir Edward Cecil.

=== Marriage and children ===
On 7 June 1576 he married Elvira de Mendoza, daughter of Íñigo Lopez de Hurtado de Mendoza, III Marquess of Mondéjar, 4th count of Tendilla, Viceroy of Naples, 1575–1579, a.k.a. Iñigo López de Mendoza y Mendoza (1512–1580), and Maria de Mendoza.

They had four children.

- Doña Victoria de Toledo, married Don Luis Ponce de León (1573-1605), 6th Marquess of Zahara
- Don García de Toledo Osorio, 6th Marquess of Villafranca (1579–1649), Grandee of Spain, notorious admiral fighting against the French and Moroccans.
- Don Fadrique de Toledo, 1st Marquess of Valdueza (1580–1634), Captain General of the Spanish Navy
- Doña María de Toledo, a nun

Government offices
Preceded by Juan de Mendoza, Marquis de la Hinojosa	Governor of the Duchy of Milan; 1616–1618	Succeeded by Gómez Suárez de Figueroa, 3rd Duke of Feria
Spanish nobility
Preceded by García de Toledo Osorio	Marquess of Villafranca del Bierzo; 1577–1627	Succeeded by García de Toledo Osorio
