= Treaty of Pavia =

1617 treaty between Spain and Savoy

The Treaty of Pavia was signed in Pavia on October 9, 1617, between representatives of the Spanish Empire and the Duchy of Savoy ending the War of the Montferrat Succession.

Based on the terms of the accord, Savoy returned Alba (in the Duchy of Montferrat) to the Duchy of Mantua, while Vercelli was returned to Savoy. Moreover, the treaty managed to establish an unstable peace between the Duchy of Savoy and the Spanish-held Duchy of Milan.

== See also ==
- List of treaties
