= Adam von Trautmannsdorf =

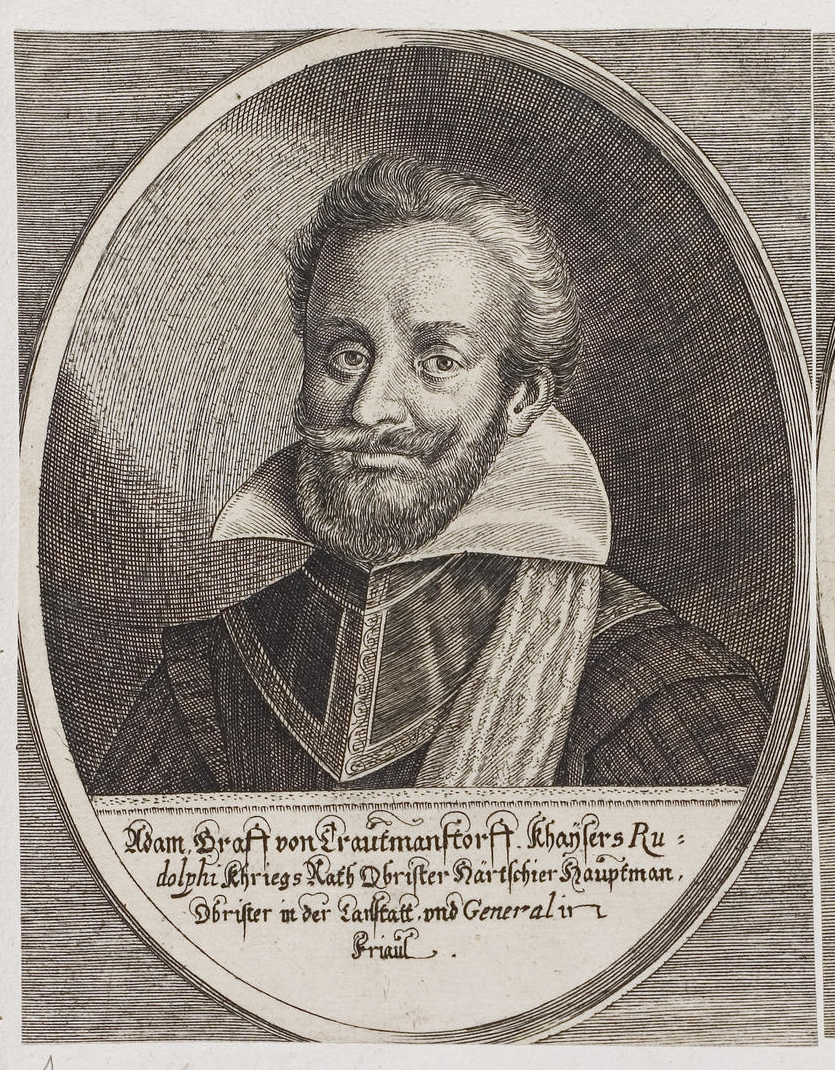
- Adam von Trautmannsdorf
- Born: 1579
- Died: June 7, 1617 (aged 37–38); Rubbia, Castel Rubbia (Gorizia)
- Military career
- Allegiance: Croatian and Austrian Littoral
- Rank: General
- Commands: Archduke in Friuli
- Conflicts: Uskok War

Adam von Trautmannsdorf (1579–1617), kaiserlicher Kämmerer und oberster Kriegsrat, general of the Croatian and Austrian Littoral. Commander in chief of the Archduke in Friuli during the Uskok War. He arrived in Gorizia on 27 December 1615 and ordered his headquarters at Rubbia Castle where he died, shot while visiting the trenches, on 7 June 1617.
