= Sèvres – Cité de la céramique =

Museum in France

Coordinates: 48°49′43″N 2°13′23″E

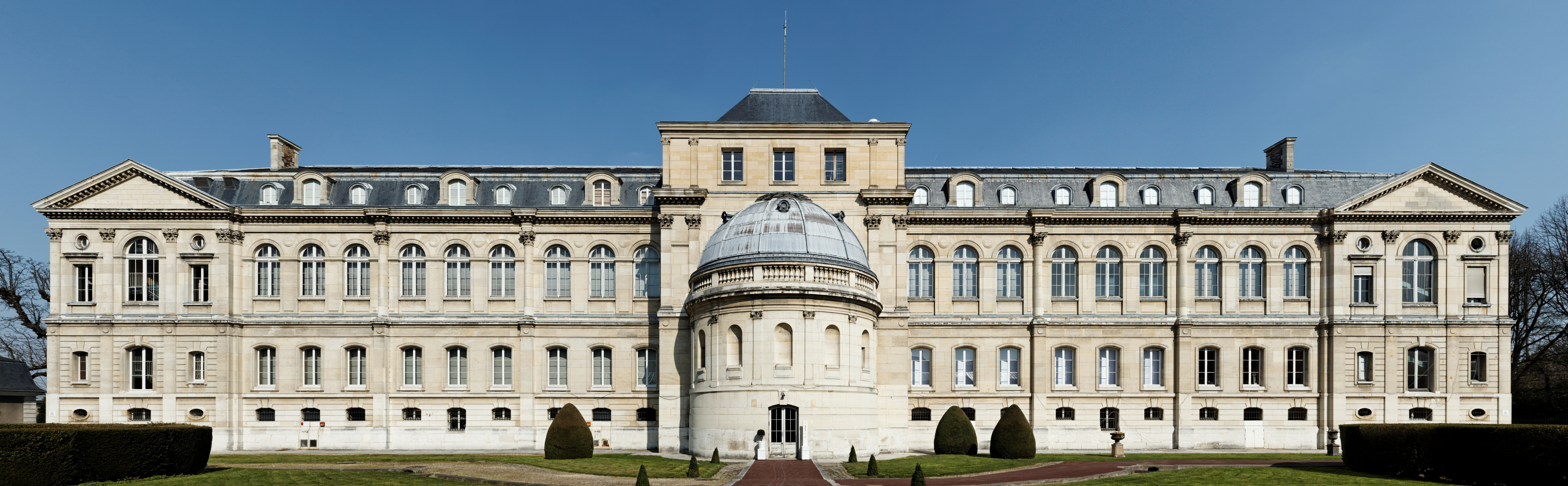
Sèvres – Cité de la céramique, France

Sèvres – Cité de la céramique (Sèvres City of Ceramics) is a French national ceramics museum located at the Place de la Manufacture, Sèvres, Hauts-de-Seine, a suburb of Paris, France. It was created in January 2010, from the merger of the Musée national de Céramique-Sèvres and the Manufacture nationale de Sèvres. The museum is open daily except Tuesday; an admission fee is charged. Access to the museum by public transportation is available from Tramway d'Île-de-France (Trans Val-de-Seine) station Musée de Sèvres on Tramway T2, and by Paris Métro station Pont de Sèvres on Line 9.

== History ==
The museum was inaugurated in 1824 by Alexandre Brongniart, director of the Manufacture nationale de Sèvres, becoming the first museum dedicated to fine ceramic arts in the world. Denis-Desire Riocreux, a renowned painter at the manufacture became the director with a goal of collecting and studying fine ceramics from all over the world. Brongniart published his treatise on ceramic art and pottery in 1845. The following year, with Riocreux, he wrote Description méthodique du musée céramique de la Manufacture Royale de Porcelaine de Sèvres, which became the museum's first catalogue. The museum became independent of the factory in 1927 under director Henry-Pierre Fourest, and was attached to the Musée du Louvre in Paris for conservation purposes in 1934.

Beginning in 1975, the museum began seeking out modern ceramics, and the exhibition space was expanded with eight new rooms. The main floor exhibits ceramics from the East and West, from its origins to the sixteenth century. The first floor of the museum is dedicated to European earthenware and porcelain from the sixteenth century to the present.

The museum holds more than 50,000 objects, of which about 5,000 were manufactured by Sèvres. In addition to traditional fine European and Asian ceramics, has an especially noteworthy collection of ceramics created by leading 19th- and 20th-century contemporary artists.

== Sevres Outdoors ==
Sèvres Outdoors was an international art project: an exhibition of outdoor artworks, in the historical gardens of museum.

=== The 2014 edition ===
Organized by CERA, the first edition of Sèvres Outdoors was held from June 30 to September 31, 2014, with 30 artworks from 25 Parisian galleries.

=== The 2015 edition ===
The second edition gathers 26 artists from 23 galleries and opens to the public from May 20 to October 25, 2015.

== See also ==
- List of museums in Paris
