= Concini =

Concini (also spelled with the prefix De) is a surname. Notable people with the name include:

Concini

- Bartolomeo Concini (1507–1578), Italian political figure and diplomat
- Concino Concini (1569–1617), Italian politician and a minister of Louis XIII of France
- Cosimo Concini (1570–1604), Italian diplomat serving the Grand Duchy of Tuscany
- Giovan Battista Concini (1532–1605), Italian politician and diplomat

de Concini

- Corrado de Concini (born 1949), Italian mathematician and professor

De Concini

- Ennio De Concini (1923–2008), Italian screenwriter and film director

DeConcini

- Dennis DeConcini (born 1937), American lawyer, philanthropist, politician and former U.S. senator from Arizona
- Evo Anton DeConcini (1901–1986), American judge who served as Attorney General of Arizona, and a justice of the Arizona Supreme Court
- John DeConcini (1918–1998), American labor union leader
