= Botti =

Botti is an Italian surname can refer to:

- Anna Maria Adorni Botti (1805–1893), Blessed, Italian Roman Catholic widow and then professed religious
- Chris Botti (b. 1962), American trumpeter and composer
- Gaudenzio Botti (1698–1775), Italian painter
- Giulia Botti (b. 1980), Italian ski mountaineer
- Guglielmo Botti (1829–1906), Italian dresser and restorer
- Ida Botti Scifoni (1812–1844), Italian painter, sculptor and designer
- Marco Botti (b. 1976), Italian racehorse trainer
- Matteo Botti (c. 1570–1621), Italian scientific instrument maker
- Raphael Jose Botti (b. 1981), Brazilian professional footballer
- Rinaldo Botti (1658–1740), Italian painter active in the Baroque period
- Villana de' Botti T.O.S.D. (1332–1361), Blessed, Italian Roman Catholic professed religious
- Alicia Botti, human character in Thomas & Friends
