= Curzio Picchena =

First Secretary of State of Grand Duchy of Tuscany
- In office 1613–1626
- Appointed by: Cosimo II de' Medici
- Preceded by: Belisario Vinta
- Succeeded by: Andrea Cioli

Personal details
- Born: 11 January 1553 San Gimignano, Duchy of Florence
- Died: June 16, 1626 (aged 73) Florence, Grand Duchy of Tuscany
- Education: University of Pisa

Curzio Picchena (Italian: Curzio Picchéna, 11 January 1553, San Gimignano — 16 June 1626, Florence) was an Italian politician and scholar associated with the humanist movement. He was born on 11 January 1553 in San Gimignano to Lorenzo da Picchena and an unknown woman. Da Picchena family was originally from Colle di Val d'Elsa, quite close to Curzio's birthplace.

== Career ==
After obtaining a doctorate in law from the University of Pisa, Picchena pursued a long career in diplomacy on behalf of the Medici family. He entered the service of Grand Duke Francesco I de' Medici by an introduction from Belisario Vinta, then a First Secretary of Tuscany. From 7 May 1576 to 1578, he held the position of legation secretary in France, serving under ambassador Sinolfo Saracini. Accused of the assassination of Florentine rebels like Troilo Orsini who had sought refuge with the Queen Mother, Catherine de' Medici, Picchena was arrested. After a month, he was released and banished from the kingdom on December 24, 1578.

However, these accusations did not hinder his diplomatic career, which he continued that same year in Spain under Ambassador Bernardo Canigiani, and the following year in Portugal with Pietro de' Medici, son of Cosimo I de' Medici. From 1584 to 1590, he was secretary of the legation at the Holy Roman Imperial court. When ambassador Orazio Urbani died in February 1588, Picchena ensured the continuity of the embassy until the new ambassador, Francesco Lenzoni, arrived in June of the same year. In 1593, he embarked on a mission to the Catholic Swiss Cantons. His primary objective was to identify a new informant for the Grand Duke and evaluate the potential for troop recruitment. This assignment, spanning nearly two years, aroused the suspicions of the Spanish. They feared his true motive was to enlist soldiers in support of Henry of Navarre, the rightful heir to the French throne, who remained a Protestant at the time. Upon completing the mission, the Grand Duke selected Franz Sebastian von Beroldingen as his new informant and Rudolf Reding as the colonel responsible for troop recruitment in the event of war.

After ambassador Lenzoni died at the imperial court, Picchena returned to Prague in 1594. He stayed there until the new ambassador, Cosimo Concini, arrived. In 1596, Picchena was dispatched to the Château d’If, an island near Marseille that Ferdinando I had taken control of in 1591. The Grand Duke had previously entrusted Captain Bousset with the island, but Bousset had recently become too friendly with the Spanish. Picchena was given the task of removing Bousset. In a daring move, Picchena successfully expelled the captain and reclaimed control of the island for the Grand Duke. That same year, Picchena also served as the Grand Duke's representative to the Duke of Guise. In 1598, he was sent to Ferrara to congratulate Cardinal Pietro Aldobrandini who took over the Duchy of Ferrara, where he first went to meet Pope Clement VIII.

He later became Secretary of State to Ferdinand I de' Medici in 1601. In 1607, he was again entrusted with a diplomatic mission, traveling to Rome to discuss the deployment of fleets to the Levant with Pope Paul V. His involvement in Florentine politics continued with his appointment as one of the "Twelve Good Men" (sort of a jury in Florence) in 1610. He obtained Florentine citizenship in 1611 and became a member of the "Eight of Guard and Balia" (Magistracy that dealt with criminal and police affairs) in 1611, and part of the "Nine Conservators of Florentine Jurisdiction and Dominion" (an institution dedicated to the maintenance of borders) in 1612. He kept corresponding with Tuscan double-agent Michel Angelo Corai until this year as well.

=== As First Secretary ===
He was appointed the first secretary of the Grand Duchy of Tuscany in 1613, succeeding his mentor Belisario Vinta. Picchena held a crucial role in managing the state's internal affairs. His responsibilities included signing mandates from the depository, supervising other secretaries, and sharing certain duties with the first auditor, Pietro Cavallo. After Cavallo's death, Picchena also took on the task of signing grace and justice memorials. Ultimately, on May 11, 1615, he assumed the position of the sole first secretary.

In 1621, he was selected for the Council of Two Hundred and served as a magistrate and counselor that year and again in 1624. He was also elected as a senator in 1621. Following the death of Cosimo II same year, the government was placed under a Regency until the heir, Ferdinand, came of age. Cosimo II had decreed that upon his death, his mother Christina of Lorraine and wife Maria Maddalena of Austria would become guardians and regents. They were to be aided by a Regency Council, with both secretaries, Picchena handling foreign affairs and Andrea Cioli managing internal affairs, participating in council meetings. However, a fierce rivalry quickly emerged between the two secretaries as they vied for the favor of the two regents. According to Riguccio Galluzzi Picchena displayed "a proud disdain for others' smallness" due to his difficult temperament, and neglected to cultivate relationships at court, relying solely on the appreciation of his "long and faithful service" to the ruling family. In contrast, Cioli skillfully built strong relationships with the Grand Duchesses and soon became the "arbiter of the Regency," effectively pushing Picchena out of the court's inner circle.

== Family ==
He married Alessandra Rossini from San Giovanni Valdarno with whom he had a daughter, Catherine in 1608. She was the wife and widow of Lorenzo Buondelmonti. She was imprisoned by Ferdinand II de' Medici in a tower of the fortress in Volterra, where she died in 1659.

== Works ==
Throughout his long service, Picchena continued to dedicate all the moments he could spare from his duties to study. He was a member of Accademia della Crusca. He maintained a friendly and literary correspondence with Justus Lipsius, whom he had met during one of his missions to Vienna in 1583, and a few examples of this correspondence remain. After reviewing Lipsius’ Tacitus using two ancient manuscripts from the Laurentian Library, he published notes and corrections, which Lipsius used extensively for his later editions of the historian's works, published in Frankfurt in 1603, in quarto format, with a dedication to Grand Duke Cosimo, written with remarkable candor. Picchena's notes, reprinted in the edition of Tacitus he published in Frankfurt in 1607 (in folio) and Geneva in 1609 (same format), were reproduced in the editions known as "Variorum." His other works include:

- Advertimenti politici per chi vogli praticare la Corte dell’illustrissimo Curtio Picchena (Political warnings for those who want to practice the Court of the illustrious Curtio Picchena)
- Vita di Ferdinando, terzo granduca di Toscana (Life of Ferdinand, third Grand Duke of Tuscany)

== Legacy ==
Picchena maintained correspondence with Galileo Galilei, accompanying him to Rome in 1615 and was a friend of Giovanni Battista Strozzi, Lorenzo Pignoria, and other scholars who flourished around the Medici court at that time. He was portrayed in Giovanni Rosini’s novel The Nun of Monza. A Story of the 17th Century (1835) as "the elucidator of Tacitus". His daughter Catherine inspired a novel, The Daughter of Curzio Picchena: A Tale, by Francesco Domenico Guerrazzi.
