= Simon Bélyard =

French dramaturge

Simon Bélyard was a French playwright of the second half of the 16th century associated with the city of Troyes.

In 1592, he wrote a tragedy, Le Guysien, whose subject was the execution of Henry I, Duke of Guise. In 1589, Pierre Matthieu had already written a play, La Guisiade, showing hostility towards Henry III of France.

== Works ==
- Le Guysien, ou Perfidie tyrannique commise par Henry de Valois ès personnes des illustr. Reverendiss. et tres genereux Princes Loys de Loraine cardinal, et Archevesque de Rheims, et Henry de Loraine, Duc de Guyse, grand maistre de France, Troyes, J. Moreau, 1592.
- Charlot. Eglogue pastorelle sur les miseres de la France, & sur la tresheureuse & miraculeuse deliurance de ... Prince Monseigneur le Duc de Guyse, etc.

== Bibliography ==
- Jean-Claude Ternaux, « La Diabolisation dans La Guisiade (1589) de Pierre Matthieu et Le Guysien (1592) de Simon Bélyard », Etudes Epistémè, n°14, automn 2008, (p. 1-17).
- Jean-Claude Ternaux, « Le traître dans la tragédie d’actualité : La Guisade de Pierre Mathieu, Le Guysien de Simon Bélyard (1592) », Seizième Siècle n°5 (2009) « Mythe et réalité de la Trahison ? ». Dossier dirigé par Patricia Eichel-Lojkine, (p. 115-132).
- Jean-Claude Ternaux, « Simon Bélyard, Ronsard et Garnier : Le Guysien (1592) », La Poésie de la Pléiade. Héritage, influences, transmission. Mélanges offerts au professeur Isamu Takata, Paris, Garnier, 2009, (p. 275-295).

== See also ==
- French Renaissance literature
