= Botto =

Botto is a surname. Notable people with this surname include:

- António Botto (1897–1959), Portuguese aesthete and lyricist poet
- Benjamin Abrahão Botto (1890–1938), Lebanese photographer
- Bianca Botto (born 1991), Peruvian retired tennis player
- Giuseppe Domenico Botto (1791–1865), Italian physicist
- Iacopo Botto (born 1987), Italian volleyball player
- Ján Botto (1829–1881), Slovak poet and writer of the Štúr generation
- Juan Diego Botto (born 1975), Argentine actor
- Lewis Botto (1898–1953), English footballer
- María Botto (born 1974), Argentine actress

== See also ==
- Botti
- Botta
