= Giovan Battista Concini =

First Secretary of State of Grand Duchy of Tuscany
- In office 1576–1576 Serving with Antonio Serguidi
- Appointed by: Francesco I de' Medici
- Preceded by: Bartolomeo Concini
- Succeeded by: Antonio Serguidi

Ambassador to Holy Roman Empire
- In office 1573–1576
- Appointed by: Cosimo I de' Medici
- Preceded by: Ludovico Antinori
- Succeeded by: Giovanni Vincenzo Modesti

Ambassador to Holy Roman Empire
- In office 1590–1594
- Preceded by: Francesco Lenzoni
- Succeeded by: Francesco Lenzoni

Personal details
- Born: 1532 Florence, Republic of Florence
- Died: December 5, 1605 (aged 72–73) Florence, Grand Duchy of Tuscany
- Children: Cosimo Concini; Concino Concini
- Parent: Bartolomeo Concini

Giovan Battista Concini (1532, Florence – 5 December 1605, Florence) was an Italian politician and diplomat during the late 16th century, serving under the Medici Grand Dukes of Tuscany. He also served as a Tuscan resident ambassador to Holy Roman Empire.

== Early life and education ==
Concini was born in Florence in 1532 to Bartolomeo Concini and Margherita Bartoli. The Concini family had relatively humble origins, with ancestors who were peasants in Terranuova, Valdarno. His father, Bartolomeo, rose to prominence at the Medici court, which greatly influenced Giovan Battista's own career trajectory. Concini received his early education from the Milanese teacher Giulio Poggiani. He went on to study law at the universities of Padua and Pisa, where he was taught by Guido Panciroli, Giulio Salerno, and Girolamo Malavolti. After completing his legal studies, Concini briefly lectured on canon law at the University of Pisa in 1560 and gained experience as an auditor at the Rota in Mantua.

== Career ==
Concini's political career was deeply tied to the influence of his father at the Medici court. His appointment as a Knight of the Order of Saint Stephen on 8 March 1563, for example, was largely due to Bartolomeo's standing with the Duke. In 1569, Concini played a ceremonial role in the grand ducal court, reading the papal bull conferring the title of Grand Duke on Cosimo I from Pope Pius V.

In April 1571, Concini entered the diplomatic field when he was sent to Vienna as part of Ludovico Antinori's delegation. Upon Antinori's death in 1572, Concini succeeded him as resident ambassador at the imperial court. His diplomatic efforts contributed to the Medici securing recognition of the grand ducal title from Emperor Maximilian II in 1575 (which was followed by an acknowledgment from Philip II of Spain). This achievement marked a significant moment in Concini's career, solidifying his position at the Medici court and earning him the title of Count of Penne.

On 15 May 1576, Concini was appointed senator and, following the death of Lelio Torelli, became the Grand Duke's auditor of jurisdiction and First Secretary. His position made him one of the most influential ministers in the Medici state. However, he soon returned to Vienna next year along with Bernardo Canigiani and Bernardo Ricasoli, to announce the birth of the Grand Duke's son, Filippo.

In 1583, he was designated as the financial overseer of the University of Pisa during a restructuring of the establishment alongside Paolo Vinta. In 1589, Concini's expertise was sought, due to his legal knowledge and significant political sway, concerning the arrangement of the University of Siena, as the plan appeared to have been formulated by those with limited practical understanding.

Concini's involvement in politics progressed with his appointment as magistrate of Pisa from 1586 to 1587. In 1588, he was charged, along with three fellow Florentines, with the duty of "improving public conduct concerning attire and other issues". By July 1590, Concini was once again dispatched as a permanent representative to the royal court in Vienna, holding this position until June 1594. It's probable that during this period, Concini's authority started to dwindle under the new grand duke, Ferdinando I, even though he kept the title of first secretary until he died.

A Lucchese envoy to the Florentine court in 1600 observed that Concini remained in charge of examining all papal communications and authorizations arriving from Rome, without whose approval no official would venture to proceed (Relazioni di ambasciatori lucchesi, p. 127). Nevertheless, under Ferdinando I's restructuring of the administration, Concini had forfeited a substantial portion of the power and influence he had wielded under Francesco I. While Torelli, for instance, had consistently conferred about the documents and requests he had to endorse as "First Secretary" with Cosimo I, Concini under Ferdinando I merely held the title of the position and never engaged in direct discussions with duke. Giovan Battista Concini died in Florence on 5 December 1605.

== Family ==
He married Camilla d'Antonio Miniati and had several issues:

1. Leonora Concini — Orazio of Monte Santa Maria, Marquis of Mealla
2. Lucrezia Concini — married Rodrigo Alidosi of Castel del Rio.
3. Carlo Concini (d. 1579)
4. Cosimo Concini (d. 1604) — ambassador to Holy Roman Empire
5. Bartolomeo Concini (6 September 1565 — 13 October 1629), knight of Order of St. Stephen (1606), married Alessandra di Filippo Antinori.
6. Concino Concini
