= Antonio Serguidi =

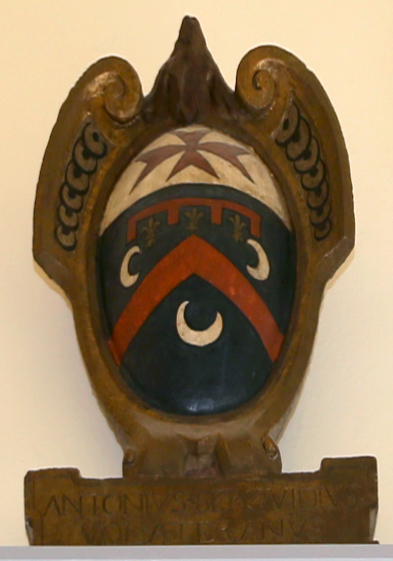
- Coat of arms of Serguidi as a knight of St. Stephen

First Secretary of State of Grand Duchy of Tuscany
- In office 1579–1587
- Appointed by: Cosimo I de' Medici
- Preceded by: Bartolomeo Concini
- Succeeded by: Pietro Usimbardi

Personal details
- Born: 1532 Volterra, Duchy of Florence
- Died: September 5, 1602 (aged 69–70) Florence, Grand Duchy of Tuscany

Antonio Serguidi (1532, Volterra – 5 September 1602, Florence) was an Italian statesman, knight and a secretary for the Grand Duchy of Tuscany.

== Background ==
He was born in Volterra, 1532 to Lorenzo Serguidi and Lucrezia Squarcialupi. He was already related to powerful families of Tuscany - his paternal grandmother was Antonia di Benedetto Guidi, a member of Guidi family and his maternal grandmother was Pietra Usimbardi, a relative of Pietro Usimbardi. His brother, Guido, would become the bishop of Volterra (1574–98).

== Career ==
=== Under Cosimo I ===
In 1558, Antonio was introduced into the service of Duke Cosimo I de' Medici by the secretary Iacopo Guidi, his relative and fellow native of Volterra, who would later become the bishop of Atri and Penne. Antonio later aligned himself with Bartolomeo Concini, another secretary of Cosimo I, whose daughter, Elisabetta, he married, distancing himself from Guidi. Concini, in the mid-16th century, had risen to a position of great prominence in managing the secretariats and became a key figure in handling foreign policy.

Serguidi was chosen to serve as secretary to the hereditary prince Francesco during the prince's journey to Spain in 1562–63. While at the Spanish court, both Francesco and Serguidi observed a governmental system structured around secretariats. Being significantly older than Francesco, Serguidi formed a strong bond with the prince, establishing the trust that Francesco would later rely on when he became Grand Duke. In 1564, Cosimo I delegated a substantial part of the government to his son Francesco. This led to an increase in Concini's influence, and he, along with his son-in-law Serguidi, acted as a liaison between the Duke and Prince Francesco. As Serguidi's public profile and power grew, he was knighted on 7 May 1567 by Ciro Alidosi and appointed Grand Chancellor of the Order of St. Stephen.

During this period, Serguidi carried out delicate diplomatic missions: in 1569, he was the extraordinary envoy of Cardinal Ferdinando to thank the pope for granting the grand ducal title. Two years later, he undertook another mission to the papal court and then to Mantua to visit Louis de Gonzague, Duke of Nevers. He returned to Rome several times: in 1572 to secure benefits for the Order of St. Stephen, in 1574 to negotiate over the Orsini’s claims on Pitigliano, in 1575 to address the reception of Tuscan ambassadors in the Sala Regia, and in 1581 to congratulate the convalescing Pope Gregory XIII.

In 1572, Serguidi went to Spain to plead with the king to intercede with the emperor on the matter of the grand ducal title, which had been granted to Cosimo by Pope Pius V in 1569 but was not yet recognized by Spain and the Holy Roman Empire. Serguidi was to inform Philip II that Grand Duke Francesco had shown a strong inclination to side with Spain and hoped to “deserve that His Majesty would finally declare his intention in this matter of the title and show that he warmly sheltered us under his wings”. Spanish recognition would arrive only on January 26, 1576. Serguidi was also tasked with asking Philip II to persuade the emperor “to desist from his obstinacy, as we have not proven ourselves useless or disloyal servants more than once”.

In 1577, Serguidi once again journeyed to Spain, this time to pave the way for the visit of Pietro de' Medici, Francesco's brother and Cosimo's youngest son, to Philip II's court. Initially, Serguidi communicated with Antonio Pérez, Philip II's influential secretary, regarding matters of the Grand Duchy's foreign policy. Subsequently, he directly addressed Philip II, affirming that "all our faith – as Francesco wrote – is placed in him, and we will forever navigate by his north star." Furthermore, Serguidi had to defend Pietro, who was accused of killing his wife, Eleonora, a member of the prominent House of Alba. He furnished Philip II with explanations of the incident and conveyed, as instructed by the Grand Duke, that "the conduct of Donna Eleonora was so public that everyone was certain of the reason." Justifying Pietro's actions by citing his wife's public adultery served as the basis for requesting a position for Pietro at the Spanish court and a place for him in the military. Serguidi also sought the appointment of Cardinal Ferdinando as protector of Spain. He presented a prestigious gift: a marble crucifix by Benvenuto Cellini, now housed in the church of El Escorial. The mission proved successful, and Philip II welcomed Pietro into his court.

=== Under Francesco ===
Upon Cosimo I's death in 1574, Francesco assumed full control of the Grand Duchy, but his inclination was to delegate its management to others. Initially, Bartolomeo Concini held a prominent role, but after 1576, possibly due to his advanced age, the handling of important matters shifted to his son-in-law, Serguidi. However, following Joanna of Austria's death in 1578 and Francesco's subsequent marriage to Bianca Cappello, the Grand Duke fell under the sway of those close to his new wife, notably her brother Vittorio, who was perceived by many to have a negative influence on Francesco.

Cardinal Ferdinando, observing from Rome, grew concerned about this development and intervened to remove some of these figures from the court. He favored Serguidi taking charge of government affairs, believing it "less damaging to his brother's dignity for Serguidi to take the lead in matters." As a result, Serguidi "remained in charge of the main direction of the government and cabinet." In line with the evolution of the government structure, he was appointed first secretary in 1579, succeeding his father-in-law. Within a few years, he consolidated all power in his hands, overseeing "state affairs and negotiations with princes, ambassadors, and other important matters."

The date of his first wife's death remains unknown, but after his father-in-law's demise in 1578, he married Orinzia Carpegna later that same year.

=== Under Ferdinando ===
Following the death of Francesco in 1587, Serguidi's political standing diminished. The new Grand Duke, Ferdinando I, aimed to curtail the political influence of Francesco's favored ministers, particularly Serguidi. In November 1587, Ferdinando established a three-member secretariat, including Serguidi alongside Belisario Vinta and Pietro Usimbardi (who assumed the role of first secretary). Serguidi's responsibilities were reduced to those of a secretary with a specific department. He was tasked with managing relations with France, Genoa, Naples, Sicily, Malta, Urbino, and Lucca, as well as handling affairs with the Turks and the Porte, overseeing the galleys and the ports of Livorno and Portoferraio, the Order of St. Stephen, prisoners and their release, potential granting of safe-conducts to outlaws from other states, matters of the Pratica Segreta, and the administration of Pistoia. Additionally, he addressed complex ecclesiastical issues such as patronages and charitable institutions. While Ferdinando I's meticulous division of tasks may have appeared somewhat disorganized, it effectively marginalized Serguidi, who became less active and gradually lost favor.

He died in Florence on September 5, 1602. He founded a commenda (a benefice or trust) over the goods of the Chapel of Sant´Andrea Apostolo in Florence, on an estate and other properties in the municipality of Poggibonsi.
