= Pietro Usimbardi =

Italian Catholic bishop and politician

- Bishop of Arezzo
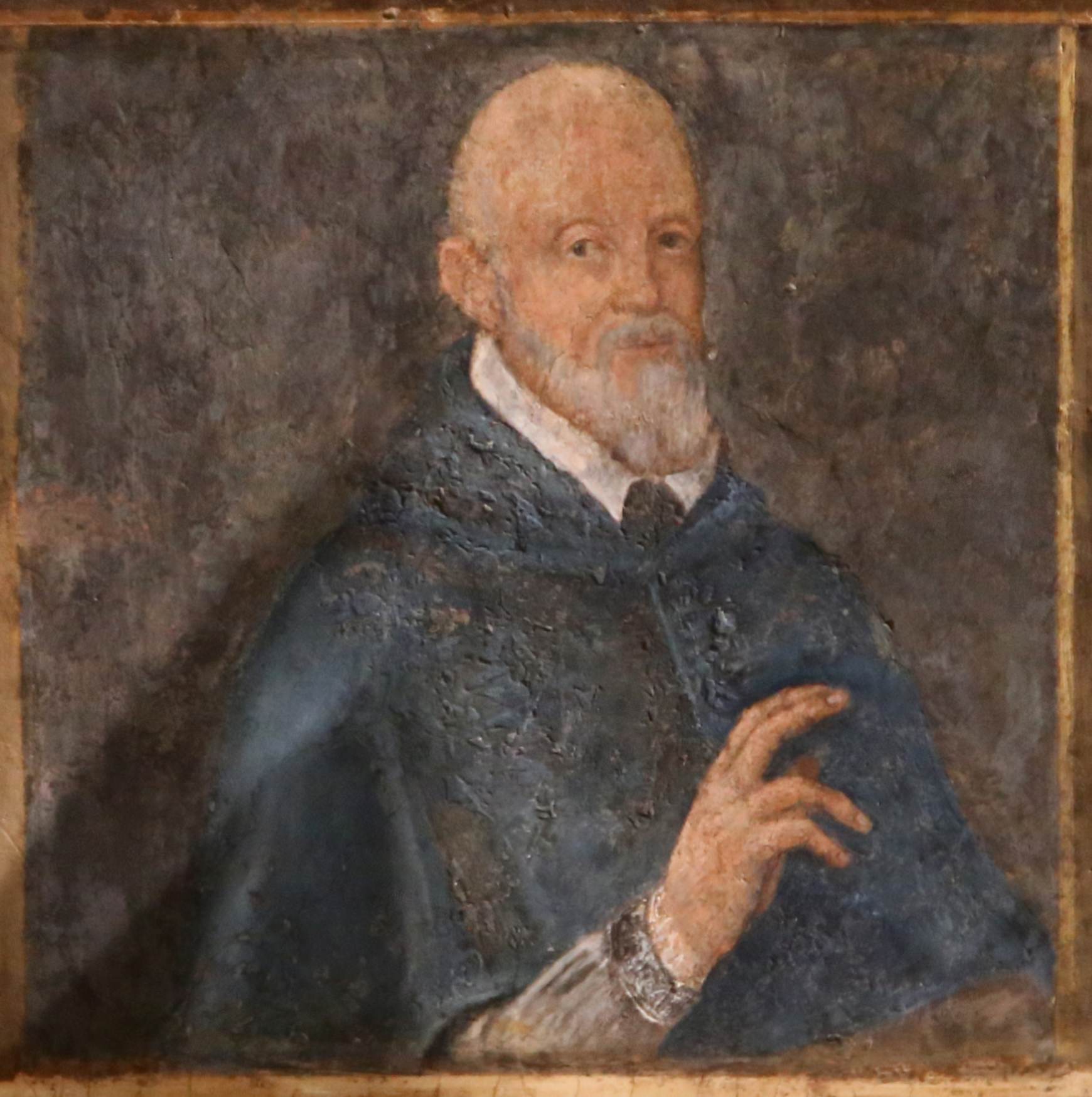
- Portrait of Pietro Usimbardi by Teofilo Torri, c. 1608
- Diocese: Arezzo-Cortona-Sansepolcro
- Elected: January 9, 1589
- Term ended: May 28, 1611
- Predecessor: Stefano Bonucci
- Successor: Antonio de Ricci

Orders
- Consecration: 1586 by Antonio Maria Gallo

Personal details
- Born: 1539 Colle di Val d'Elsa, Republic of Florence
- Died: May 28, 1611 (aged 71–72) Arezzo, Grand Duchy of Tuscany
- Buried: Santa Trinita, Florence
- Education: University of Pisa
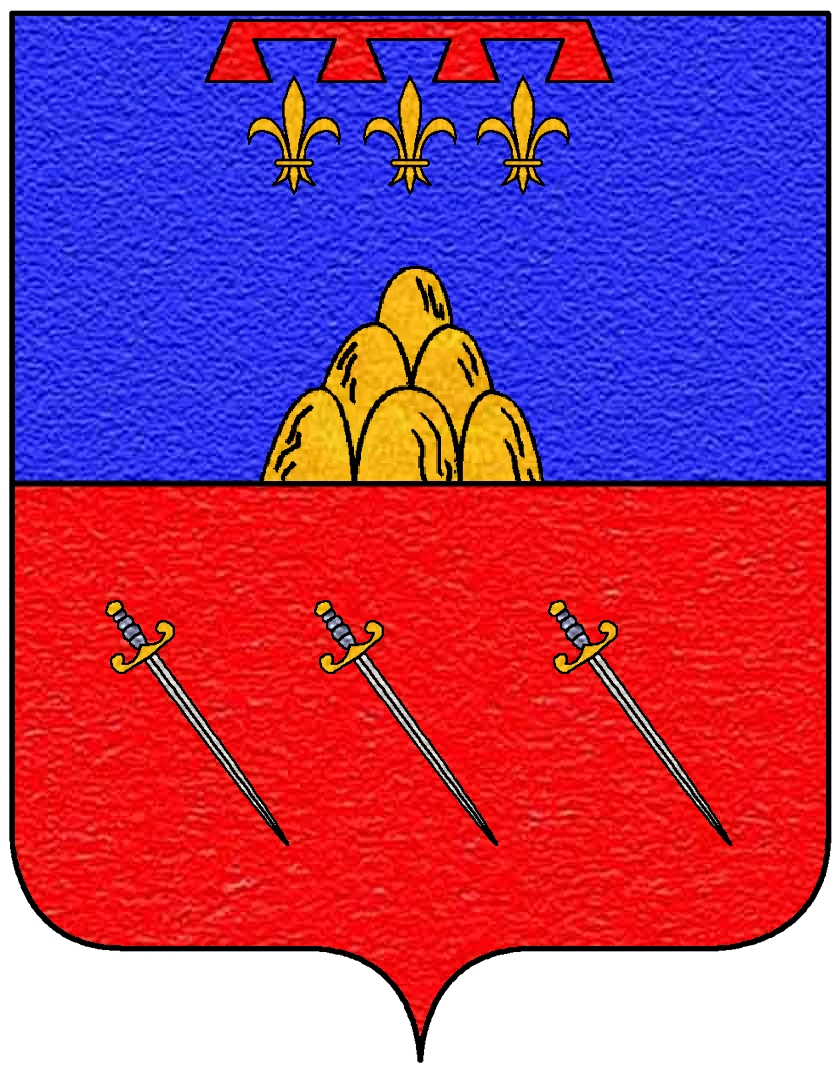
- Coat of arms

Pietro Usimbardi (9 January 1539, Colle di Val d'Elsa – 28 May 1611, Arezzo) was an Italian Catholic bishop who also served as a secretary for Grand Duchy of Tuscany.

== Background ==
Pietro was born in Colle di Val d'Elsa to Francesco di Pietro Usimbardi and Lucrezia Viviani. Hailing from a family of notaries in Colle, Vinta's father held various local positions, including notary for the municipality of San Miniato and legal prosecutor. Pietro was the eldest of five sons: Lorenzo (1547–1636) followed his brother's path into politics; Usimbardo (1552–1612) became the first bishop of the diocese of Colle; Claudio (1556–1638) and Fulvio (1559–1627) also pursued successful careers. All the brothers received a strong education in law and theology, which prepared them for their future roles in public service.

== Career ==
While a secular career was common for his family, Pietro was steered towards an ecclesiastical path, possibly due to personal interest or the family's financial struggles. His career was shaped under the guidance of Monsignor Salvatore Pacini and Abbot Bernardo Giusti, a fellow townsman. Giusti, connected to the Usimbardi family, served as secretary to Giovanni de' Medici and later to the young Cardinal Ferdinando de' Medici after Giovanni's death in 1562. He played a pivotal role in Pietro's career, introducing him to the Medici circle in 1556 and employing him in his secretariat. When Giusti retired or perhaps died in 1565, Pietro stepped into his shoes.

As first secretary, Pietro accompanied Ferdinando de' Medici to Rome when the latter became a cardinal. During this time, he continued his education, earning a theology degree from the University of Pisa in 1570. The following year, he was appointed parish priest of the Church of Santa Maria a Limite and granted the office of propositura in Cigoli. The church, originally built by the Humiliati in the second half of the 13th century on the site of the old Church of San Michele, underwent several transformations and later became the Church of San Giovanni Battista. Pietro Usimbardi personally funded the church's restoration and, in 1585, donated it along with its surrounding lands to the Order of Saint Francis of Paola.

In his capacity as first secretary, he attended the 1572 and 1585 conclaves with Cardinal Ferdinando, which elected Gregory XIII and Sixtus V, respectively. He was a constant presence in Rome, serving Ferdinando and earning high regard from both popes. During these early years, he would return to Florence yearly on behalf of Cardinal Medici to provide updates and represent Ferdinando's needs to Cosimo. This position solidified Pietro's connection to Ferdinando, fostering a deep trust that continued even after Ferdinando became Grand Duke of Tuscany. Pietro's success also opened doors for his brothers.

=== Under Ferdinando ===
When Ferdinando took over as Grand Duke from his brother Francesco in 1587, he aimed to curtail the influence of Francesco's preferred ministers. To achieve this, he restructured the political administration, establishing a three-part secretariat. This secretariat included Antonio Serguidi (Francesco's minister, whose power was significantly diminished), Belisario Vinta (a key figure during Ferdinando I's reign), and Pietro Usimbardi. On November 2, 1587, Usimbardi was officially appointed as the First Secretary of State, also known as the "Secretary of the Chamber". This appointment was made through a motu proprio, a document issued directly by the Grand Duke.

Usimbardi, who oversaw eleven officials, was responsible for a broad range of duties. These included managing relations with Rome, the Papal States (except Bologna), Spain, and Mantua. Additionally, he oversaw the general treasury, the university and College of Pisa, matters of grace and justice, and ceremonial functions at court. His residence was in the Guardaroba Vecchia, an apartment linked to the Grand Duke's quarters, allowing him unrestricted access to the Grand Duke. In 1588, the Senate granted citizenship to Pietro's father and extended it in perpetuity to his male descendants.

In the late 1580s, it seemed likely that Usimbardi would be elevated to the rank of cardinal, but the death of Sixtus V in August 1590 put an end to this possibility. Initially reserved in his manner, after the motu proprio of 1587, he was advised to become more approachable and started to act in a more gentle and friendly way. Through this measured and humble approach, Usimbardi earned the favor of Ferdinando, who was not easily swayed to such displays of esteem. This was because Usimbardi did not interfere in the Grand Duke's affairs unless specifically asked or practically compelled to do so, and he only offered advice when requested. However, another account suggests that while he did manage the most crucial state affairs and profited from them, he was still viewed as loyal and trustworthy.

=== As bishop ===
On January 9, 1589, Pietro was appointed Bishop of Arezzo, and on March 25, 1590, he formally entered the city. Although he handed over his political duties to his brother Lorenzo, he continued to provide assistance with political matters for several months, even attending the wedding of Christina of Lorraine and Ferdinando. In 1593, Pietro's "particular experience and knowledge of the Roman court" led him to continue advising Ferdinando on various matters, including encouraging him to pursue the reclamation of the Val di Chiana.

After Lorenzo took over as First Secretary from Pietro, a sort of dynamic tension developed between the two brothers. Pietro, in his role as a prelate, and Lorenzo, as Grand Ducal Secretary, represented contrasting viewpoints and interests. The rise of the Usimbardi brothers also brought benefits to their hometown of Colle, which was elevated to a bishopric. Their younger brother, Usimbardo, was elected its first bishop in 1592.

Although he obtained the episcopal office through the recommendation of the Grand Duke to Pope Sixtus V, Pietro's work in Arezzo was regarded as one of the most significant in the diocese's history. He promoted the reorganization of the diocesan archive, a project initiated by his predecessor, Bishop Stefano Bonucci. In 1592, he began construction of the Capuchin convent church in Lucignano, completed the following year and consecrated in 1604. In the meantime, in 1595, he consecrated the Cathedral of Arezzo, whose long-delayed construction was finally completed. The cathedral was dedicated to Saints Peter, Stephen, and Donato (today, only Saint Donato). He also built the Oratory of Saint Stephen on the hill where the previous cathedral had stood.

In 1602, the Usimbardi family acquired a private chapel within the Church of Santa Trinita. Its decoration was a prestigious project, entrusted to renowned artists like Ludovico Cigoli, Matteo Rosselli, Cristofano Allori, and Iacopo da Empoli. Further solidifying their position in Florence (even with Pietro mainly residing in Arezzo), the Usimbardi brothers purchased the Palazzo Acciaiuoli in 1603.

== Works ==
During his administration of the Diocese of Arezzo, Pietro faced challenges in his interactions with the canons. However, he demonstrated dedication in getting to know the territory and consistently carried out pastoral visits, the reports of which have been made public. In 1597, Pietro presided over a synod that embraced the principles and decrees of the Council of Trent, later published in his principal work: Constitutiones et decreta published in the Synodo diocoesana Arretina, quam Petrus Usimbardius episcopus Arretij habuit anno Domini MDXCVII, printed in Florence by B. Sermartelli in 1598. His work aimed to disseminate and implement the council's principles. The guidelines contained in his work would become an indispensable reference point for many of his successors.

In 1603, he published Costitutioni et ordini per i monasteri femminili (Constitutions and Orders for female monasteries), strictly enforcing the rule of enclosure. Additionally, in 1605, he published Constitutiones fori (Constitutions of the Ecclesiastical Court), a concise guide aimed at streamlining the ecclesiastical court's structure, defining timelines for various stages of the process, and setting response times for the vicar.

He also focused on improving ecclesiastical buildings. In 1595, he initiated the renovation of the episcopal palace, transforming it into a more luxurious and aristocratic residence. He also modernized the Villa Godio and the Pescaiola estate, and supported the construction of the Capuchin and Franciscan convents in Lucignano and the Church of Madonna della Consolazione in Foiano della Chiana. In 1610, he oversaw the renovation of the Church of Santo Stefano in Arezzo.

Pietro was a member of the Florentine Academy and wrote a biography of Ferdinando I, a highly laudatory work edited by Enrico Saltini in 1880 named Istoria del granduca Ferdinando dei Medici (History of Grand Duke Ferdinando dei Medici). In the early 17th century, Pietro oversaw the construction of the Church and Convent of San Pietro in his hometown of Colle di Val d'Elsa, entrusting the project to Giorgio Vasari the Younger and endowing it with an annual income of 25,000 scudi.

== Death ==
Pietro Usimbardi died on May 28, 1611, and his body was preserved through embalming. Following a temporary interment in the cathedral, his remains were relocated to the Chapel of the Crucifix in Santa Trinita, Florence, as per his wishes. He was laid to rest beside his brother, Usimbardo.

== Bibliography ==
- Guglielmo Enrico Saltini, Istoria del Gran Duca Ferdinando I de' Medici scritta da Piero Usimbardi [History of Grand Duke Ferdinando I de' Medici Written by Piero Usimbardi], in Archivio Storico Italiano, 1880, pp. 3–8.
- Francesco Dini, Gli Usimbardi di Colle Val d'Elsa [The Usimbardi of Colle Val d'Elsa], in Miscellanea storica della Valdelsa, VIII, 1899, pp. 193–201.
- Marcello Fantoni, La corte del granduca. Forma e simboli del potere mediceo tra Cinque e Seicento [The Court of the Grand Duke. Forms and Symbols of Medici Power between the 16th and 17th Centuries], Bulzoni, Rome 1994.
- Luca Trapani, Usimbardo Usimbardi, giurista e vescovo di Colle Val d'Elsa [Usimbardo Usimbardi, Jurist and Bishop of Colle Val d'Elsa], in Annuario dell'Istituto Storico Diocesano di Siena, III, 1996–97, pp. 45–144.
- Silvano Pieri, Pietro Usimbardi, vescovo della riforma cattolica in Arezzo (1589-1611) [Pietro Usimbardi, Bishop of the Catholic Reformation in Arezzo (1589–1611)], in Annali aretini, XII, 2005, pp. 197–219.

Preceded by Antonio Serguidi	First Secretary of State of Grand Duchy of Tuscany; 2 November 1587 – 9 January 1589	Succeeded by Belisario Vinta
