= Roderigo Alidosi =

Italian nobleman, diplomat and courtier

Lord of Castel del Rio
- Tenure: 1589 – 1623
- Predecessor: Ciro Alidosi
- Successor: Mariano Alidosi
- Born: c. 1545; Florence, Duchy of Florence
- Died: September 25, 1623 (aged 77–78); Florence, Grand Duchy of Tuscany
- Buried: Santa Maria del Carmine, Florence
- Family: Alidosi
- Spouse: Lucrezia Concini
- Father: Ciro Alidosi
- Mother: Elena de Mendoza

Roderigo or Rodrigo Alidosi (c. 1545, Florence - 29 September 1623, Florence) was an Italian nobleman, diplomat and courtier in the service of the Medici family. A member of Alidosi family, he was the penultimate lord of Castel del Rio.

== Early life ==
Roderigo Alidosi was born around 1545 in Florence to Ciro Alidosi, lord of Castel del Rio, and Elena de Mendoza, maid of honor of Eleonora de Toledo, wife of Cosimo I. He was named after his maternal grandfather, Rodrigo de Mendoza and was a grand-nephew of Francesco Alidosi. As a second, he was destined for ecclesiastical career and later moved to Rome and spent some time with Mark Sittich von Hohenems Altemps and was given scholarship by Cardinal Castagna. He studied law in University of Siena and Pisa and graduated in 1587. However, after his brother's death he became heir to his father at some point in his life, Roderigo married Lucrezia Concini, daughter of Giovan Battista Concini.

Upon his father’s death in 1589, Roderigo inherited the lordship of Castel del Rio and received from Grand Duke Ferdinando I the Order of St. Stephen commandery of Romagna established by his father in 1566 and endowed with family estates in the dioceses of Imola and Cesena.

== Career ==
Roderigo, being connected to powerful Concini family, he was entrusted with various diplomatic tasks: He visited Munich in 1590, Spain in 1602, and Warsaw in 1605 to offer the Medici's respects to Sigismund III of Poland for his victory in Livonia and his marriage to Archduchess Constance of Austria. While in Warsaw, Roderigo also began talks with the ambassador of False Dmitry I to secure trading privileges for Florentine merchants in Moscow, equivalent to those granted to Polish traders. From 1605 to 1607, Roderigo lived in Prague as the Medici's envoy at the court of Emperor Rudolf II. During negotiations for the marriage of Cosimo, the grand duke’s eldest son, to Magdalene, daughter of Archduke Charles of Austria, Roderigo prepared a report for Ferdinando I outlining the situation in the empire.

== Controversy with Papacy ==
When Roderigo came back to Italy in 1607, he brought along a young Bohemian Protestant named Hans Christoph Berbistorff, whom he welcomed into his home at Castel del Rio. This action triggered a conspiracy against him and his dominion. The local priest and inquisitorial vicar, Andrea Mazzoni, was upset with the high taxes Roderigo levied on church property. He secretly reported Roderigo to the Inquisitor of Romagna, accusing him of brutality towards his people and heresy, specifically focusing on his connection with Hans Christoph. The Papal authorities had long sought an opportunity to intervene in Castel del Rio, which, located on the border of the Province of Romagna, had served as a refuge for outlaws from the Papal States, with the Alidosi family generously exercising the right of asylum. The final provocations—the 24 May 1603 decree permitting the people of Castel del Rio to harbor outlaws in Roderigo’s absence without reporting them, and the pardon granted by Roderigo’s wife to Dionisio della Valle, condemned to death by Papal authorities—prompted the Vatican to act decisively to revoke the Alidosi’s lordship and annex Castel del Rio into the Romagna province, a goal ultimately achieved in 1638 during the lordship of Roderigo’s son Mariano. This background spurred the Inquisitor of Romagna to take Andrea Mazzoni’s denunciation seriously.

On 4 July 1608, while Roderigo was oblivious to the accusations against him, the Inquisitor ordered his arrest in Borgo di Rossignano, within Papal territory. However, Roderigo, tipped off by the Dominican Vincenzo Blondi, managed to escape to Florence. Ferdinando I had him imprisoned in August 1608, ostensibly to transfer the trial to the Holy Office in Florence. Simultaneously, understanding the true motives behind the Vatican's actions, Ferdinando dispatched a hundred armed men from Mugello and Firenzuola to occupy Castel del Rio. The incident caused a commotion in Florence, where public sentiment largely believed in Roderigo's innocence, and many were angered that a former ambassador could be detained. Even the Venetian ambassador Francesco Morosini commented on the seriousness of the situation. Roderigo had influential supporters: Ferdinando I himself intervened on his behalf with Pope Paul V through his minister in Rome and the apostolic nuncio in Florence, while Roderigo’s brother-in-law Concino Concini and his wife Leonora Dori persuaded the French king Henry IV to write directly to the pope in support of Roderigo. Paul V was compelled to respond favorably to these powerful advocates.

Many individuals supported Roderigo's moral and religious conduct, particularly Luca Nardi, Provincial Commissioner of the Minor Conventuals in Bohemia. He testified from Prague on 26 October 1608 that Roderigo had no questionable interactions with Protestants during his time in Bohemia. On 22 September 1608, the Council of Men and the Community of Castel del Rio also vouched for Roderigo's innocence and good character, although possibly under pressure. These efforts were successful, and Roderigo, who had been released by the Grand Duke in November 1608 but remained under the supervision of the Holy Office in Florence, was effectively cleared of all charges on 23 July 1609 by the General Inquisitor of Florence, Fr. Cornelio da Milano of the Minor Conventuals. He received only minor disciplinary actions.

Upon returning to Castel del Rio, Roderigo promptly abolished the laws of Imola that were in effect there and introduced Tuscan laws in 1610. He resumed his diplomatic service, being sent to Lorraine in 1610 by the new Grand Duke Cosimo II. Upon his return, Mazzoni accused him again, this time of orchestrating an attack carried out by his nephew, Giovan Francesco Albizzi, against Annibale della Vigna, a witness who had testified against him in the Florence trial. The Vatican's interest was reignited, and Cardinal Mellini urged the Inquisitor of Romagna to conduct a thorough investigation, but the matter was dropped, possibly due to the pope's intervention. Roderigo had been completely uninvolved in the attack.

A third attempt to incriminate him occurred in 1616 when Cardinal Rivarola requested his arrest on charges of impiety. In late summer 1619 the Inquisition displayed renewed interest. However, Cosimo II personally vouched for Roderigo's orthodoxy, and the charges were dismissed.

== Later years ==
In 1618, Roderigo rented his allodial lands and the legal powers of his lordship to the Medici for 2,000 scudi, extending the agreement for another five years in 1621. He also established the Chapel of St. Helena in the Church of the Carmine in Florence. Roderigo died on 29 September 1623 while the Vatican was preparing new documents to assert its claim over Castel del Rio. His lordship was inherited by his son Mariano.

== Family ==
He married Lucrezia Concini (d. 4 September 1648), the daughter of Giovan Battista Concini with whom he had:

- Ciro (died in infancy)
- Mariano Alidosi, Lord of Castel del Rio (d. 29 December 1645)
- Isabella (d. 14 September 1649)
- Elena Alidosi (1593-1655) married to Francesco Avogli (1588-1641) from Ferrara

== Works ==
- Relazione di Germania e della Corte di Rodolfo II imperatore negli anni 1605-1607 (Modena, 1872)

== Sources ==
- Mayer, Thomas F. (2014). The Roman Inquisition on the stage of Italy, c. 1590-1640 (1st ed.). Philadelphia: University of Pennsylvania Press. ISBN 978-0-8122-4573-8.
