= Lelio Torelli =

Italian civil servant

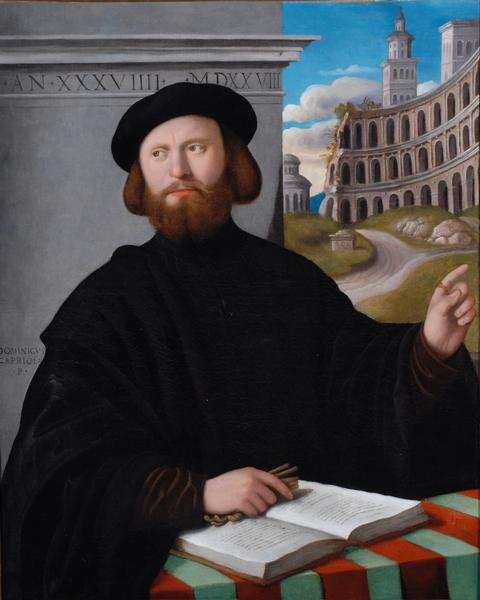
- Portrait of Torelli by Domenico Caprioli as governor of Rimini, kept in Bowes Museum

First Secretary of State of Grand Duchy of Tuscany
- In office 1546–1571 Serving with Bartolomeo Concini
- Appointed by: Cosimo I de' Medici
- Preceded by: Francesco Campana
- Succeeded by: Bartolomeo Concini

Personal details
- Born: 28 October 1489; Fano, Duchy of Urbino
- Died: March 27, 1576 (aged 86); Florence, Grand Duchy of Tuscany

Lelio Torelli (28 October 1489, Fano – 27 March 1576, Florence) was an Italian civil servant and jurist, secretary of Cosimo I de' Medici.

== Early years ==
Born in 28 October 1489, in Fano to Giovanni Antonio Malatesta-Torelli and Camilla Costanzi. The Torelli family was a Ghibelline family originally from Bologna, but a minor branch settled in Fano with their ancestor Azzolino Torelli serving as chief magistrate of Fano in 1203.

The details surrounding his formative years, as recounted in various biographies, whether published or unpublished, are frequently unreliable or even inaccurate. It is known that Torelli journeyed to Ferrara for his early education, accompanied by his uncle Jacopo Costanzi, a professor of Greek and Latin at the university there. Upon returning to Fano, he was compelled to depart due to internal strife within the city. He sought sanctuary in Perugia, where he resumed his studies, but it is uncertain whether he earned doctorates in both civil and canon law at the young age of 22, as records indicate he was still enrolled as a student in March 1512.

== Career ==
Subsequently, Torelli became deeply involved in the political landscape of his city. In 1516, amidst the unrest in Fano under the oppressive rule of Constantine Arianiti, he was charged with sedition and condemned to death. However, in his capacity as an ambassador to Rome, he successfully negotiated peace for his city, which was then entrusted to Lorenzo de' Medici. Torelli further solidified his ties with the Medici family, particularly with Leo X and Cardinal Giulio, the future Clement VII, as demonstrated by a letter in which he sought their backing for his appointment as a judge in Rome. In 1537, he delivered a eulogy commemorating the passing of Duke Alessandro.

In either 1525 or 1529, depending on the source, Torelli was named governor of Benevento, a position he held for approximately a year and a half. Between 1527 and 1528, he likely also served as governor of Rimini and Meldola under Pandolfo Malatesta. He was known for his piety and religious devotion, particularly drawn to Franciscan spirituality, though his beliefs didn't always mesh with the Counter-Reformation climate of the time.

In 1531, due to the backing of Clement VII and ducal secretary Francesco Campana, he was designated auditor of the Florentine Ruota (court), a role he held for two three-year periods. In 1539, prior to the completion of his second term, he was elevated to general auditor of the Duke. Following Campana's demise in 1546, Torelli ascended to the position of first secretary and became a trusted legal advisor to Cosimo I. He played a pivotal role in resolving conflicts and negotiations, including those with the Duke of Ferrara regarding matters of precedence, and in securing the title of Grand Duke. Torelli was frequently appointed as a judge by the Duke and oversaw petitions, facilitating a direct paternalistic connection between Cosimo and his subjects. He assisted in settling disputes, often favoring the disadvantaged, such as widows and orphans. He successfully resolved the dispute between Cosimo and Lorenzino de' Medici over the family's patrimonial assets.

In 1571, Torelli was exceptionally admitted into the Senate, even though he wasn't a Florentine citizen, and was further elevated by being added to the Florentine nobility. Serving as an auditor of Secretariat of the Royal Law since 1546, he became a pivotal figure in Cosimo's ecclesiastical policies. He staunchly defended the grand duke's prerogatives, such as the exequatur for papal court citations, while also ensuring due respect for ecclesiastical jurisdiction where it was applicable. Torelli also adopted jurisdictionalist positions on matters like the sale of ecclesiastical assets and opposed the introduction of the Index of Prohibited Books, the yellow cap for Jews, and their subjection to the Inquisition for certain crimes, believing these matters should remain under secular jurisdiction.

In 1543, Torelli was appointed auditore della Studio of the University of Pisa, some kind of Minister of Education, granting him influence over the selection of professors, though some efforts, such as recruiting Andrea Alciato, proved unsuccessful. He also participated in drafting the university's new statutes. In 1561, he co-authored, along with Belisario Vinta and Benedetto Varchi, the statutory code of the Order of St. Stephen, for which he oversaw the legal details. While Torelli generally exercised his power with restraint, some accounts suggest he grew more inclined towards independent action and involvement in private matters, which ultimately strained his relationship with Cosimo, resulting in the transfer of some of his responsibilities to Bartolomeo Concini in 1570. However, he kept administrating the University of Pisa until his death, a position that was taken over by Giovanni Battista Concini (son of Bartolomeo) in 1576.

Torelli retired in 1571, following the passing of his wife, and died in Florence on 23 March 1576 believed to be after suffering a stroke. His correspondence and legal opinions are preserved in various collections within the Florence State Archives. However, according to Guido Carocci, Torelli was killed in an ambush by Troilo Orsini at the Canto degli Aranci (between present-day Via Ghibellina and Via Verdi streets in Florence), due to suspicions of his complicity with murder of Isabella de' Medici. Though, this victim might be a grandson or a son of Torelli. His biography was published by Domenico Maria Manni in 1770.

== Justinian's Pandects ==
Torelli was an intellectual with humanistic leanings, particularly in the legal domain. In Florence, he initiated a project to publish a new edition of Justinian's Pandects. With the Duke's permission, he kept the manuscript at his residence and collaborated with a group of scholars, including his son Francesco, his nephew Bartolomeo Ammiani, Giovanni Battista Cesario, and Pietro Vettori. Torelli utilized the collation previously done by Poliziano and Pier Matteo Uberti, but he also went further by examining other manuscripts and consulting with scholars like Johannes Metellus and Antonio Agustín regarding unclear passages in the text. Approximately ten years later, by the end of 1542, the work was complete and prepared for publication. In Florence, Torelli released three treatises related to certain laws from Book XLV of the Digest, offering a glimpse into his findings from collating the Pandects. Notably, Torelli was the first to observe that, due to an ancient binder's mistake, the final pages of the title De diversis regulis iuris in the Florentine manuscript of the Digest (Littera Florentina) were misplaced. He concluded that this manuscript was the original from which other copies of the Pandects were derived, although this assumption was later disproven. His treatises, the sole remnants of Torelli's more extensive annotations on the entire Digest, demonstrate his independent and critical thinking. He didn't shy away from sharply criticizing other renowned humanists such as Ulrich Zasius and Alciato, though these critiques were toned down through Agustín's intervention.

The publication of the Pandects faced further delays, spanning another ten years, during which Agustín's Emendationum et opinionum libri IV, grounded in his studies of the same manuscript, were released with Torelli's consent. This postponement stemmed from the quest for a suitable printer and the Duke's reluctance to allow publication outside Florence, as he sought exclusive rights to prevent future reprints elsewhere. Consequently, it was not until 1553 that the Pandects finally emerged, published in three exquisite volumes by Lorenzo Torrentino. The edition was meticulously prepared with utmost philological precision, ensuring the highest degree of faithfulness to the original manuscript. Torelli employed specific graphic symbols to denote words with spelling variations, showcasing the corrections made. Words inserted later were enclosed in parentheses, an asterisk marked doubtful or uncertain passages, and alternative readings were occasionally noted in the margins, always emphasizing the less reliable one. A significant achievement of his work was the elimination of numerous material errors that had infiltrated the Digest's text over time. Another noteworthy innovation was Torelli's choice to publish the Pandects without the customary apparatus of Accursian glosses.

== Legacy ==
Among his lesser works, later jurists attributed to him annotations on Bartolus de Saxoferrato’s work. Torelli was an eclectic scholar. In his youth, he wrote a short work similar to Pietro Bembo’s Asolani, as well as some poetry, which he resumed writing in his old age. He is also tentatively credited with a Lezione su la pittura (Lecture on Painting), first published in Fano in 1907. As a political figure, Torelli was a patron of intellectuals, writers, and scientists, forging friendships with figures such as Pietro Aretino and Benedetto Varchi. He defended Varchi during a rape accusation and later supported him with recommendations. Torelli sponsored several literary and artistic works, such as Bernardo Segni's translations of Aristotle’s writings and Pontormo’s fresco cycle in the Basilica of San Lorenzo. He was a member, censor, and consul of the Florentine Academy, which he helped to found. He also played an active role in the creation and drafting of the statutes of the Accademia del Disegno (Academy of Design) in 1563. Another friend of his was Vincenzo Borghini.

== Family ==
At the age of 28, Torelli wed Maddalena Lia Marcolini (d. 1571), and together they had six sons and three daughters, who mostly predeceased him as well, except for poet Giovanni Antonio Torelli.
