= Pierre Matthieu =

French writer, poet, historian and dramatist (1563-1621)

Pierre Matthieu (1563–1621) was a French writer, poet, historian and dramatist.

== Biography ==
Pierre Matthieu was born at Pesmes in the Haute-Saône (then in the Free County of Burgundy in the Holy Roman Empire. He studied under the Jesuits and mastered Latin, Ancient Greek and Hebrew. At the age of 19, he served his father as adjunct at the Collège of Vercel (also in the Free County of Burgundy) and it was there that his tragedy Esther (published in Lyon in 1585) was performed by the students. He studied law at Valence (then part of the Dauphine), he received his doctorat in 1586 and became a lawyer at the Présidial Court of Lyon (then part of the province called the Lyonnais.

Although he had expressed his attachment to the House of Guise and the Catholic League, he was among those chosen and sent by the inhabitants of Lyon to King Henry IV of France in February 1594 to assure the new king of their fidelity. With the king having visited the city the year before, Matthieu was put in charge of organizing the ceremonies of the royal reception. Subsequently, he moved to Paris and, with the protection of Pierre Jeannin, he became historiograph. He was esteemed by the royal court and enjoyed special access to Henry IV.

He fell ill accompanying Louis XIII at the siege of Montauban and died in Toulouse at the age of 58.

== Works ==
Pierre Matthieu wrote five tragedies:

- Clytemnestre (1578) - the story of Clytemnestra
- Esther (1581) - the story of Esther
- Vashti (1589) - the story of Vashti
- Aman, de la perfidie (1589) - the story of Haman
- La Guisiade (1589) - an attack of Henry III and justification of his assassination.

The five tragedies of Matthieu sought — despite their use of Biblical or ancient stories (other than La Guisade) — to explore contemporary issues of the French Wars of Religion and to justify the noble defense of religion; the tragedies' heroes were generally allegorical representations of Henry I, Duke of Guise.

As poet, he published Tablettes de la vie et de la mort and Quatrains de la vie et de la mort.

His novels, La Magicienne, Aelius Sejanus and La Femme Cathenoise were hostile to Concini and his wife.

He also wrote several works of history and royal historiography. For example:

- Histoire de Louis XI, Roy de France (1610)
- Histoire de France et des choses memorables advenues aux provinces estrangeres durant sept annees de paix du règne de Henri IV (1605)
- Historiopolitographia Sive Opus Historicopoliticum: In Qvo Res Toto Pene Orbe Hisce Proximis Annis gestae (1611)
