= Francesco Campana =

Italian statesman

First Secretary of State of Duchy of Florence
- In office 1 May 1531 – 1546
- Appointed by: Alessandro de' Medici
- Preceded by: Position established
- Succeeded by: Lelio Torelli

Personal details
- Born: 1494 Colle di Val d'Elsa
- Died: 1546 (aged 51–52) Florence, Duchy of Florence

Francesco Campana (after c. 1494, Colle di Val d'Elsa – September 1546, Florence) was an Italian statesman, layman of the Church of St. Martin in Montughi from 1537 to 1546. He played a significant role during annulment controversy between Catherine of Aragon and Henry VIII of England.

== Early life and background ==
Francesco Campana was born in Colle di Val d'Elsa toward the end of the 15th century, certainly not before 1491, to a family of non-noble origins. His father, Giovan Battista, was likely a doctor or artisan, while his mother, Caterina Staccini, came from an ancient but impoverished family. He had four siblings - brothers Niccolo and Camillio, as well as sisters Ginevera and Laura.

Campana adopted the surname of an illustrious Florentine family, "Campana," to obscure the humility of his origins once he had achieved a degree of notoriety. Francesco's paternal lineage traces back to Piero, the bell-ringer (campanaio). Piero, the son of another Bartolomeo, held the position of bell-ringer for the commune of Colle, a role that appeared to be passed down within the family, at least from his time onwards. Following Piero's death, the position was filled by his son Bartolomeo, then by his sons Giovanni and Biagio, and later by Piero, the son of Biagio and brother of Giovanni Battista, Francesco's father.

On his maternal side, Caterina, descended from Staccini family—commonly referred to in the region as Niccolò degli Staccini—the family's standing might have been somewhat higher. The name was indeed long-established, dating back to the 14th century. However, the historically recognized main branch of the family, founded by Ser Staccino, a notary, initially had three branches. These branches, however, multiplied so extensively that by the 15th century, all but one family had experienced economic decline and held no significant power or prestige in the area. Caterina belonged to one of these less prosperous and modest offshoots. Her grandfather, Giovanni, possessed in 1427 a taxable estate worth 41 fiorini and had numerous children, further dividing the already small property. It's reasonable to assume that Niccolò had limited wealth when he married his daughter to Giovanni Battista, who, as far as we know, was neither wealthy nor prominent in Colle. Therefore, even the Staccini family did not distinguish itself through noble lineage, at least when compared to other, more influential families of the time in terms of power and wealth.

== Career ==
At an unspecified date, Campana left Colle di Val d'Elsa for Florence, where he came into contact with the powerful Medici family. By 1516, he had secured their protection and entered their service. His rise was swift, as evidenced by his commission on December 22, 1516, to find a workshop for Michelangelo to work on marble. During this period, Campana served Lorenzo de' Medici, Duke of Urbino, and learned the trade of secretary and political advisor from Goro Gheri.

Campana later entered the service of Cardinal Giulio de' Medici and continued as his chamberlain even after Giulio ascended to the papal throne as Clement VII in 1523. On the occasion of the pope's election, Campana delivered a panegyric oration in honor of the late Adrian VI.

=== Under Clement VII ===
On 12 December 1528, Clement VII sent Campana on a delicate mission to the English court to destroy a secret papal bull that annulled Henry VIII's marriage to Catherine of Aragon. Henry VIII had requested the annulment, and Cardinal Campeggio had been tasked with examining the issue. The bull granted the divorce but was to be shown only to Henry and Cardinal Wolsey privately. However, the situation shifted after the Siege of Naples in 1528, and the pope, now allied with Emperor Charles V, no longer needed English support. Campana's mission was to destroy the bull, all while pretending his journey was part of a diplomatic effort to resolve the marriage issue.

Campana met Francis I on the road on 1 January 1529. After stopping in Paris, Campana reached the English court on 17 January, where he was received with many honors because he was believed to be there to favorably resolve the divorce issue. He met with Henry VIII and Wolsey, but had a great argument with Henry on 19 May. Eventually, the bull was destroyed, allowing Campana to return to Florence on May 26, 1529.

=== Under Alessandro de Medici ===
In 1530, Clement VII directed Campana to serve the newly established Duchy of Florentine Republic and assist Alessandro de' Medici, who was destined to become the head of the government. According to Benedetto Varchi, as the Republic's first secretary during Simone Tornabuoni’s gonfalonierate, Campana altered public records to favor Alessandro's rise. On May 1, 1531, he was appointed first chancellor of the Republic, and in July, he read the decree of Charles V, proclaiming Alessandro de' Medici as the head of Florence.

He stayed by Alessandro's side, serving as his trusted advisor and secretary until the duke's demise. Campana played a crucial role in balancing the influence of aristocratic advisors like Matteo Strozzi, Francesco Vettori, and Roberto Acciaiuoli, and significantly shaped all of the new duke's political endeavors. Detailed records from this period are scarce; it is only known that on January 3, 1536, he accompanied the duke to Naples, where Alessandro had to defend himself before Charles V against accusations leveled by Florentine exiles.

Campana enjoyed numerous benefits: in 1535, he received a canonry in the cathedral. He later acquired the parish of Cavriglia in Valdarno, the Church of San Romolo in Florence, the chapel of the Abbey of Dovadola, the priory of Montughi, the parish of Miransù, the Church of Montui, and the priory of Sant'Antonio in Fano. Despite Lastri's belief that Campana had taken ecclesiastical orders due to his work with the pope, it appears certain that he remained a layman throughout his life.

On January 6, 1537, he was among the first, alongside Cardinal Cybo (cousin of Clement VII), to be informed of Alessandro's assassination. Together, they made swift decisions: to discreetly move the duke's body to San Lorenzo, immediately contact Alessandro Vitelli, the commander of the imperial troops, urging him to arrive quickly with as many soldiers as possible, and to keep the news quiet to allow the day to pass peacefully.

In the aftermath, he aligned himself with Cybo, Vitelli, and Maurizio Albertoni, who were strong supporters of imperial policies. They believed in the presence of Spanish soldiers and wanted to reinforce Charles V's control over the city, advocating for the election of Giulio, Alessandro's illegitimate son, who was still a child. However, the group of aristocrats led by Vettori and Francesco Guicciardini succeeded in electing Cosimo, the son of Giovanni dalle Bande Nere, with the goal of liberating Florence from imperial influence. This was a setback for Campana and explains (along with the belief that the new ruler's position was precarious) his initial reluctance towards Cosimo. When asked to write a letter of reconciliation to Cardinals Salviati, Ridolfi, and Gaddi, who were leaders of the Medici opposition, he declined, using illness as an excuse.

However, he soon changed his stance and didn't hesitate to mislead Bernardo Giusti, his rival, persuading him to resign from serving the new prince to ensure his own confirmation as first secretary, a position he dedicated himself to wholeheartedly. His work in these challenging early years of government proved crucial for Cosimo. Thanks to Campana and other trusted advisors (Lelio Torelli, Pierfrancesco Ricci, Angelo Marzi, Ugolino Grifoni, Lorenzo Pagni), Cosimo had a reliable core that solidified the foundation of his fragile power.

=== Under Cosimo I ===
Guided by Campana's counsel, Cosimo immediately adopted a two-pronged strategy: internally, he asserted his power with a firm, absolutist approach, consolidating his control within Florence. Externally, he sought to gradually wrest autonomy from Charles V, reducing the Holy Roman Emperor's influence over the Medici principality. This approach was evident in the May 1537 negotiations with the imperial ambassador, Ferdinando da Silva, Count of Cifuentes. Campana advised Cosimo to demand the same level of authority Alessandro had held before his death and the return of the fortresses in Florence, Livorno, and Pisa, which were still under Spanish control and hindered the Medici principality's independence.

A staunch opponent of the new pope, Paul III, Campana also encouraged Cosimo to adopt a hostile stance towards him, leading Cosimo to reject a marriage proposal with the pope's relative, Vittoria Farnese, in January 1537. The following year, Campana and Cybo were dispatched to the Nice conference to address unresolved Tuscan matters with the emperor, such as the return of the fortresses and the proposed marriage between Cosimo and Margaret of Austria. Campana met with Cybo in Massa in late April and then traveled by sea from La Spezia to Genoa and Nice, arriving on May 10. During the talks, he presented the Florentine government's perspective to Charles V.

In August of the same year, the pope accused Campana before imperial ministers of intrigues, arrogance, and boasting against the emperor. However, Cosimo fervently defended Campana, proving all the accusations to be false. This only intensified Campana's hatred toward Paul III. In the following years, he not only stirred his lord but also the Tuscan clergy against the pope, going so far as to call him "evil, arrogant, unjust, and shameless," and declaring, "I do not care about dying, as long as I do not do it before Pope Paul!"

In October, new accusations were leveled against Campana by Don Giovanni de Luna, commander of the Spanish garrison in Florence, who sought to discredit Cosimo before the emperor through Campana. Once again, the slander was not believed.

Campana's work regarding internal politics in 1538-39 was particularly significant. He successfully marginalized Cardinal Cybo, who, in his attempts to expand his influence and power, had kept Giulio, Alessandro's illegitimate son and potential rival to Cosimo, by his side. In 1540, Campana intervened in the dispute over the collection of extraordinary tithes imposed on all Italian ecclesiastical benefices by the pope. Together with Torelli, he introduced a ban suspending all payments until an agreement with the pope was reached. In August 1541, he accompanied the duke to Genoa to pay homage to the emperor.

== Later years ==
In his later years, Campana's political influence waned, and he was consulted less frequently, partly due to declining health. It's probable that Duchess Eleonora of Toledo's hostility impacted the duke's attitude, as she wanted Campana to be more submissive to Spain, especially after he opposed the emperor's request for a 200,000 scudi loan. However, Campana still received the oath of allegiance from troops stationed at the fortresses, which were finally returned to the duke in 1543. He died in early September 1546 and was laid to rest in the Church of San Romolo.

== Legacy ==
Campana was recognized not only for his political acumen but also for his literary talents, despite having published only one work: Virgiliana quaestio (Bologna 1526). This text, dedicated to Ercole Gonzaga, was reprinted numerous times. In the preface to the 1540 Milan edition, Campana expressed his intention to write more Virgilian questions, but this project remained unfinished.

He was an active member of the Florentine Academy, even serving as its consul from February 7, 1545. He temporarily hosted the academy in his home before it found a permanent location. In July 1546, just a few months before his death, he gave a public reading as an academic on Petrarch's sonnet: "Amor che nel pensier mio vince et regna."

Campana fostered close relationships with numerous intellectuals of his time, including:

- Guglielmo Pazzi, who dedicated his Latin translation of Aristotle's Poetics to Campana.
- Leonardo Giacchini, who dedicated his translation of Galen's De praecognitione to him.
- Benedetto Varchi, who dedicated his Dichiarazione sulla seconda parte del canto XVI del Purgatorio to him.

He shared a particularly strong bond with Pier Vettori, with whom he maintained a lively correspondence. In 1538, Campana even persuaded Vettori to accept the position of lecturer at the Florentine Studio with an annual salary of 300 scudi. In the autumn of 1545, Campana went to great lengths—using trickery, abuse, and intimidation—to prevent the publication of Segni's Italian translation of Aristotle's Rhetoric, even appealing to the duke. This was done purely to please his friend Vettori. He also maintained cordial relations with Bartolomeo Cavalcanti, despite his distance from Florence, expressing interest in seeing Cavalcanti's first books of Rhetoric in October 1545.

Campana played a decisive role in reorganizing the University of Pisa, which had been dissolved since 1494. He devoted himself to this task with great zeal in 1543–44, seeking students and distinguished teachers and structuring the university on the model of those in Parma and Pavia. In 1544, he inaugurated the attached college for forty young men with a speech.
