= Domenico Caprioli =

Italian painter

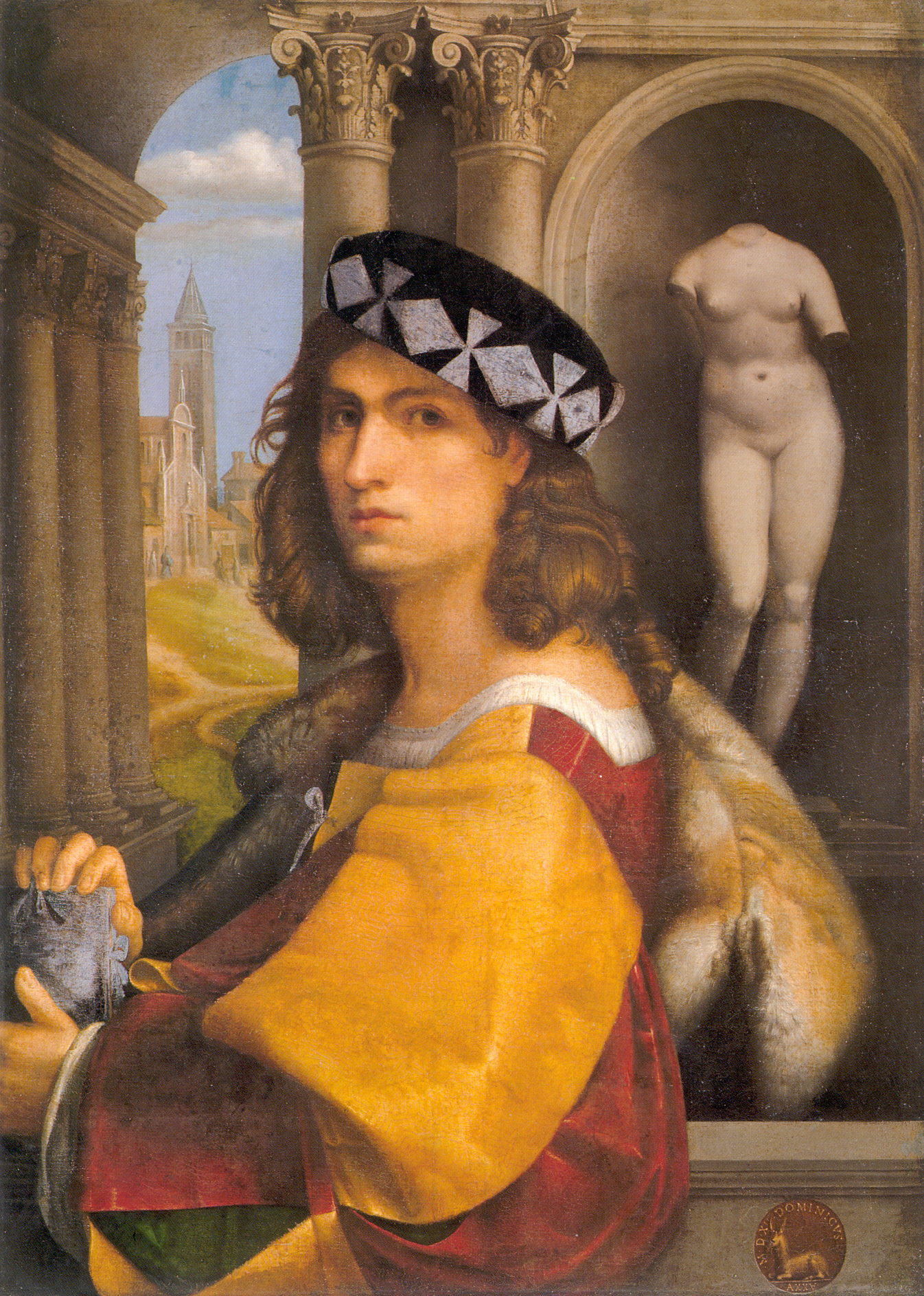
- Self Portrait, 1512, Oil on canvas, 117 x 85 cm, Hermitage Museum
- Born: 1494; Treviso, Republic of Venice (present-day Veneto, Italy)
- Died: 1528 (aged 34)
- Known for: Painting
- Movement: High Renaissance (Venetian school)

Domenico Caprioli (1494–1528) was an Italian painter born at Treviso in 1494. He produced portraits in the style of Giorgione.

== Life ==
Caprioli was the son-in-law and pupil of Pier Maria Pennacchi and rose to prominence in the early 16th Century during the High Renaissance. In addition to portrait works, he painted numerous altarpieces. He was murdered at the age of 34 by his wife's stepfather, allegedly following a years-long dispute over her dowry. Several portraits attributed to him survive today, some of which are on display at the Hermitage, Bowes, and Gemäldegalerie museums.

== Gallery ==
Works by Domenico Caprioli
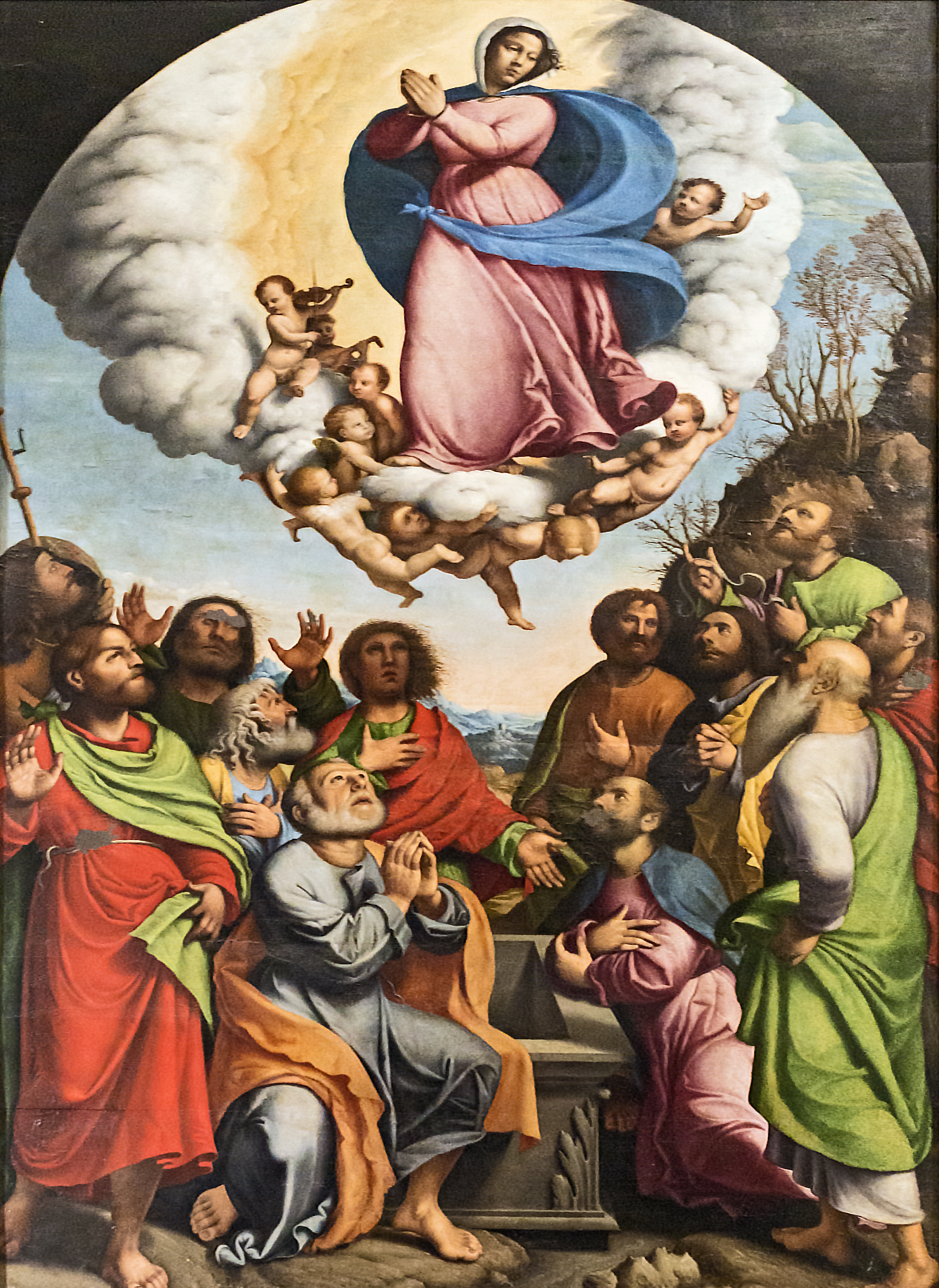
Assumption of the Virgin (1520) in Treviso Cathedral

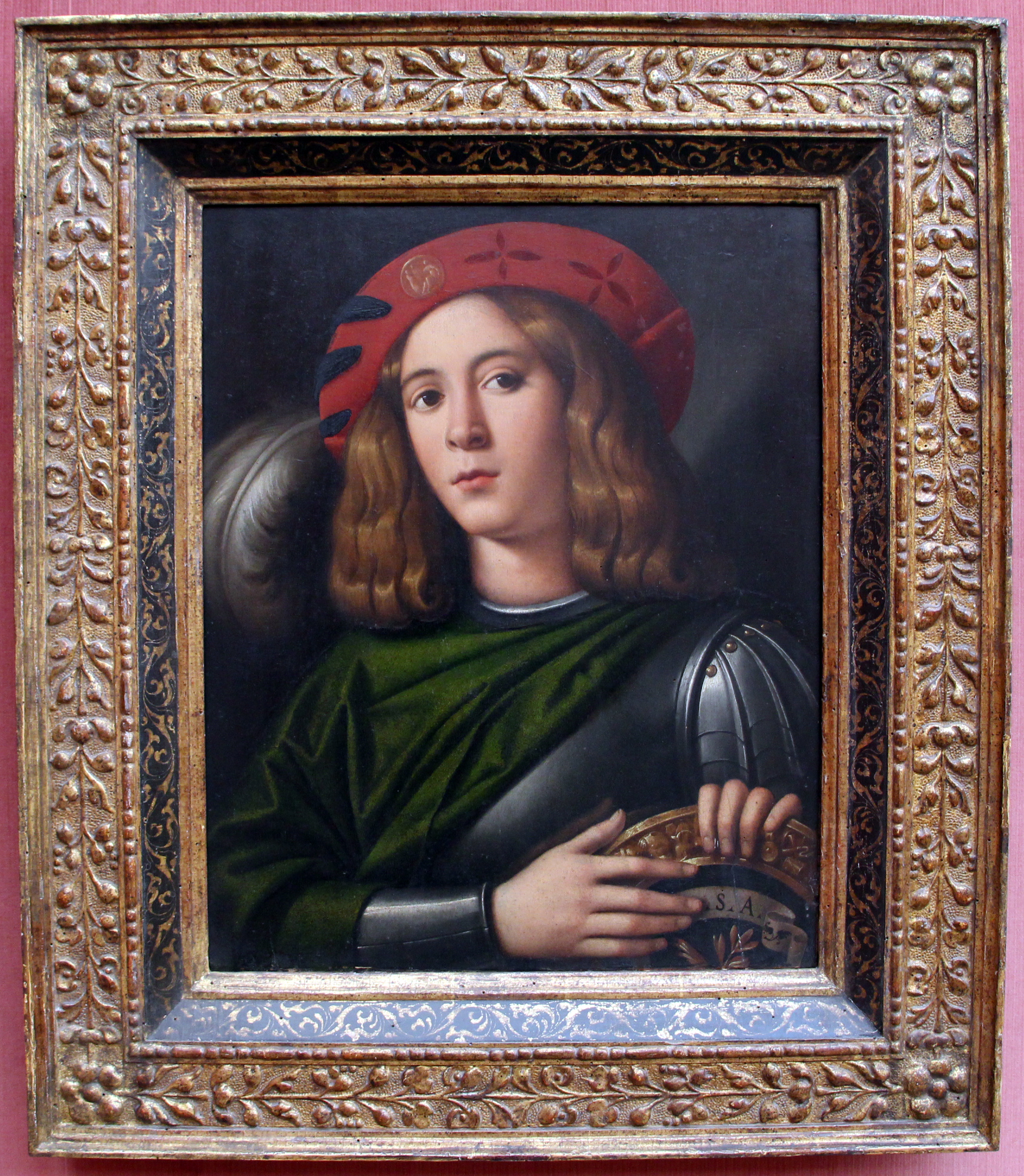
Portrait of a Young Man in Armour (c. 1520)

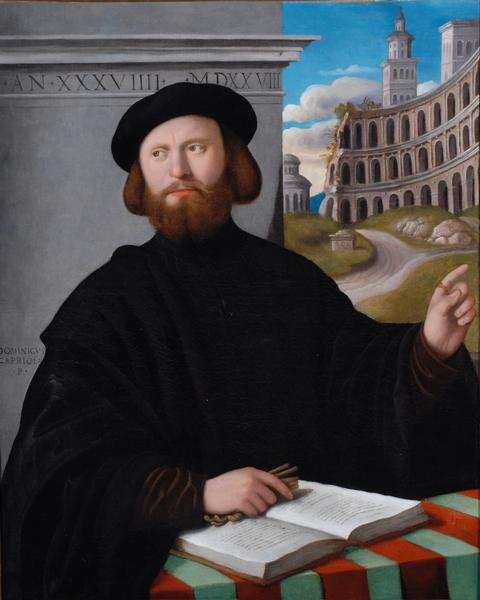
Portrait of Lelio Torelli (1528)

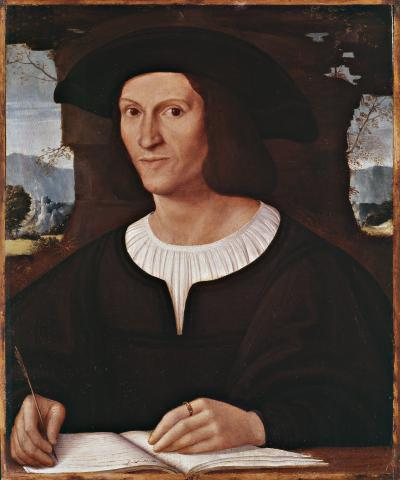
Portrait of a Man
