= Ciro Alidosi =

16th-century Italian nobleman (1520–1589)

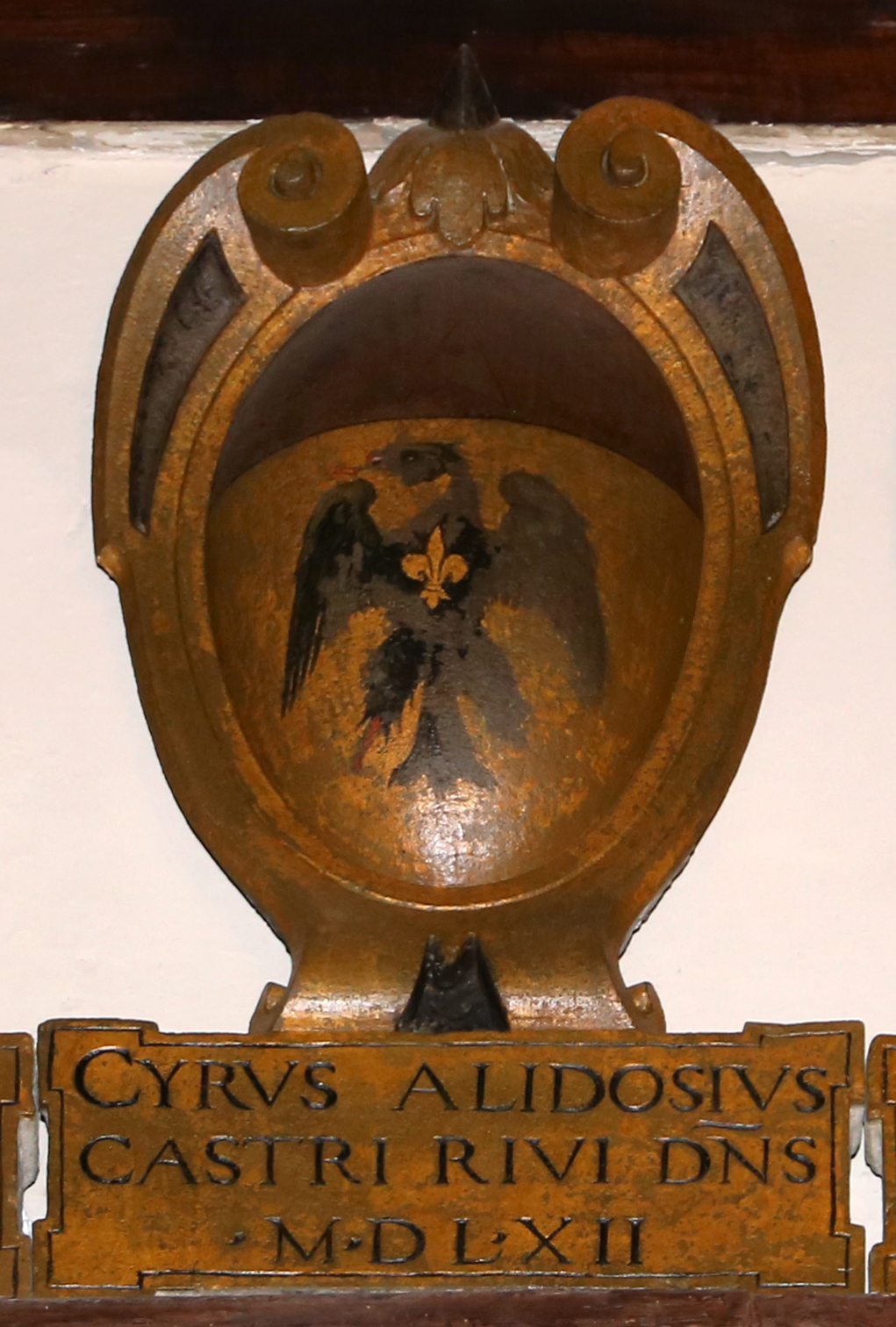
- Coat of arms of Ciro Alidosi as a knight of St. Stephen

Lord of Castel del Rio
- Tenure: 1560 – 1589
- Predecessor: Cesare Alidosi
- Successor: Roderigo Alidosi
- Born: c. 1520; Castel del Rio, Duchy of Florence
- Died: November 29, 1589 (aged 68–69); Florence, Grand Duchy of Tuscany
- Family: Alidosi
- Spouse: Elena di Rodrigo de Mendoza
- Father: Giulio Alidosi
- Mother: Virginia Chigi

Ciro Alidosi (c. 1520, Castel del Rio — 1589, Florence) was a 16th-century Italian nobleman, diplomat, and lord of Castel del Rio, known for his service to the Medici and his controversial governance.

== Early life ==
Ciro Alidosi was born around 1520 to Giulio Alidosi and Virginia Chigi. His mother was from Chigi family of Siena. His maternal grandmother was Sulpizia Petrucci, one of the daughters of the lord of Siena, Pandolfo Petrucci. His grandfather Beltrando was brother of Cardinal Francesco. Entrusted by his cousin and guardian, Cesare Alidosi, he was presented to Cosimo I who gave Ciro the title of chamberlain.

== Tenure as lord of Castel del Rio ==
In 1560, following the death of Cesare Alidosi, who left no male heirs, Ciro inherited the lordship of Castel del Rio and became head of Alidosi family. In addition to Castel del Rio, his domains included Massa, Fornione, Fossignano, Fontana, Gaggio near Bologna.

On March 30, 1562, Cosimo I knighted him as part of Order of Saint Stephen as one of its 310 original knights. His reign saw completion of the Palazzo Alidosi, a construction project that had begun earlier in the century under the design of Bramante. However, his governance was marred by controversy. Ciro was known for imposing heavy taxes, territorial usurpations, and acts of violence against his subjects, even by the standards of his time.

In 1585, Giacomo Ravaglia, a notary of the Curia of Bologna, accused Ciro and his son Giulio Cesare of orchestrating the murder of Camillo Galbini, a small landowner from Cedrecchia who had refused to sell his property to Ciro. According to Ottavio Mazzoni Toselli, Galbini once bought these lands from dona Laura Legnani, a cousin of Alidosi family. The resulting trial found Ciro guilty, and he was condemned in absentia. That same year, Ravaglia further accused Ciro of organizing a retaliatory attack against him. Once again, Ciro was convicted in absentia, but thanks to the protection of the Medici family, he faced no consequences for either conviction.

The papal authorities took a particular interest in Ciro's rule due to his liberal use of a policy that allowed bandits to find refuge within the territories of his lordship, located on the border of the Romagna. This practice, viewed as an abuse by the papacy, became particularly problematic in 1585, when Pope Sixtus V launched a vigorous campaign against banditry. Despite this effort, Ciro's protection prevented the capture of certain members of the Pepoli family, who were identified as major supporters and organizers of banditry in the Imola region.

== Career as diplomat ==
In 1565, Ciro was dispatched to Bavaria to accompany Archduchess Joanna of Austria to Florence, where she would marry Francesco de' Medici. Ciro founded the St. Stephen Order's Bailiwick of Romagna on December 16, 1566, with his own resources. He endowed this commenda with twelve well-cultivated estates totaling 1,200 tornature in the district of Fornione, along with a palace, church, and garden surrounded by walls. To enrich it further, he annexed additional lands situated in the territory of the city of Cesena. Next year, he knighted Antonio Serguidi, future Medici secretary on 7 May.

In 1570, Ciro accompanied Cosimo on his visit to Rome, where Pope Pius V bestowed upon Cosimo the title of Grand Duke of Tuscany.

After Cosimo's death in 1574, Ciro was sent to Genoa, Madrid, and Lisbon to inform those courts of the event. Ciro continued to serve under Cosimo's successor, Francesco I, who assigned him various diplomatic missions. In 1575, he attended the Diet of Regensburg, where he secured recognition of the Medici's grand ducal title from Emperor Maximilian II. Francesco rewarded him by betrothing his daughter to Paolo Giordano I Orsini which was refused by Orsini.

In 1577, he acted as the grand ducal representative in Spain and served as ambassador in Lisbon. Two years later, in 1579, he was sent on a diplomatic mission to Bavaria. In 1587, Ciro traveled to Vienna, Dresden, and Warsaw to announce the death of Francesco. He was appointed a gentleman of the chamber by Christina of Lorraine, wife of new Grand Duke Ferdinand I.

He died in 1589, passing the lordship to his son Roderigo.

== Family ==
Shortly before 1545, Ciro married Elena di Rodrigo de Mendoza, a lady-in-waiting to Eleonora de Toledo, the wife of Cosimo I. The couple had several children:

- Giulio Cesare, member of Landsknecht guards of Cosimo I, married to Filippa Laura Bartolelli. Died in 1589.
- Roderigo Alidosi, lord of Castel del Rio
- Eleonora Alidosi – betrothed to Roberto d'Altemps, son of Mark Sittich von Hohenems Altemps on April 17, 1567. However, this commitment was already dissolved by the cardinal in 1572 with a letter sent to Alidosi on January 31. She was later married to Giovan Maria Pantaleoni with whom he had a son, Ciro Pantaleoni.
- Elisabetta Alidosi – married to knight Giulio Baffadio of Imola
- Virginia Alidosi – married to Carlo Appiano (d. 1621), pretender to throne of Principality of Piombino
