= Cosimo Concini =

Tuscan ambassador to Holy Roman Empire
- In office 1595–1601
- Appointed by: Ferdinando I de' Medici
- Preceded by: Francesco Lenzoni
- Succeeded by: Rodrigo Alidosi

Tuscan ambassador to Spain
- In office October 1602 – November 1603
- Appointed by: Ferdinando I de' Medici
- Preceded by: Rodrigo Alidosi
- Succeeded by: Giulio Riario

Personal details
- Born: 1570 Florence, Grand Duchy of Tuscany
- Died: 1604 (aged 33–34) Valladolid, Spain
- Parent: Giovan Battista Concini

Cosimo Concini (1570, Florence – 1604, Valladolid) was an Italian diplomat serving Grand Duchy of Tuscany in 16th-century.

== Biography ==
He was born in 1570, Florence to Giovan Battista Concini and Camilla d'Antonio Miniati. He had a successful ecclesiastical and diplomatic career, largely due to the influence of his father and grandfather, Bartolomeo Concini, both of whom had served as First Secretary to the Grand Dukes Cosimo I, Francesco I, and Ferdinando I of Tuscany.

Cosimo first gained recognition at the Medici court after the death of Francesco I in 1587, for whom he composed a funeral oration. He was the only person to note Francesco's military help to Philipp II's invasion of Portugal. He then embraced an ecclesiastical career, obtaining the title of apostolic referendary under Pope Clement VIII in 1588.

Concini's diplomatic career took off on 17 November 1595, when he was named the Grand Duke's resident ambassador to the imperial court. This appointment was largely due to his father Giovan Battista's continued influence at the Medici court.

While serving as ambassador, Cosimo mainly resided in Prague, where he met the Danish astronomer Tycho Brahe. Brahe, who had planned to send his son to Tuscany for astronomical studies, asked Concini to help get a residence permit for his son in Florence. Although Concini tried his best with Ferdinando I and his secretary Belisario Vinta, the permit was refused because of Brahe's Protestant faith. However, Concini was still able to help Brahe by making it easier for him to correspond with Galileo Galilei as his patron.

In October 1601, Cosimo was relieved of his duties as ambassador to the imperial court and went back to Florence. On 12 October 1602, he was appointed ambassador to Spain. He reached Valladolid on 29 November and was greeted by Philip III on 14 December. Soon after arriving in Spain, Concini fell ill. His letters from 1603 reveal growing financial troubles, made worse by his declining health.

Cosimo Concini passed away in Spain in 1604.

== Works ==
- Oratio Cosmi Concini ex comitibus Pennae habita in funere Francisci Medicis Magni Etruriae Ducis Romae in aede D. Joannis Florentinorum (1587)
