= Guglielmo Botti =

Italian painter

Guglielmo Botti (9 December 1829 – after 1906) was an Italian dresser and restorer.

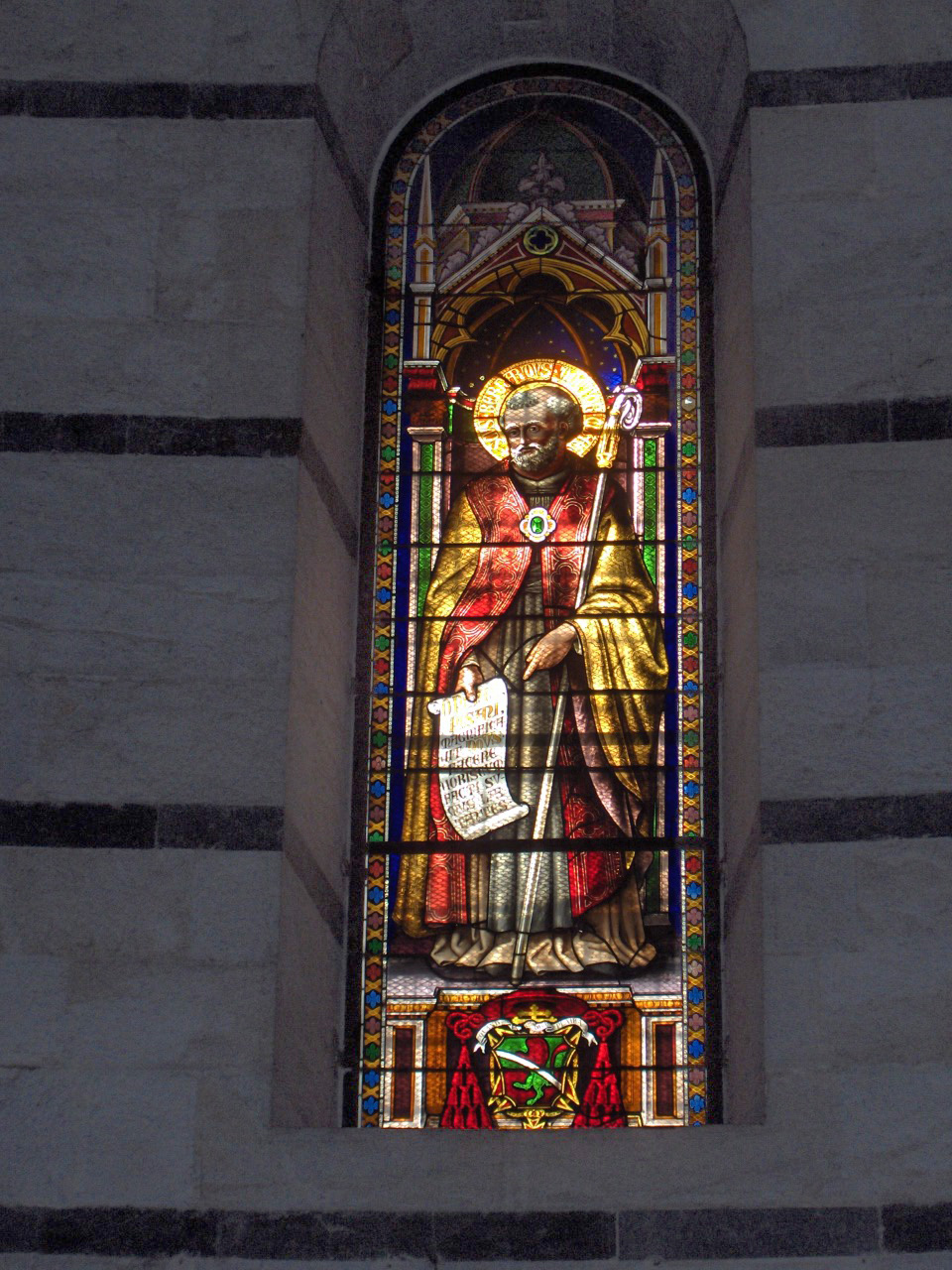
"Saint Bernard", stained-glass window (1855) in the baptistry of Pisa, Italy

He was born in Pisa. He trained under Tommaso Gazzarrini in Pisa, and Giuseppe Bezzuoli in Florence.

He trained as an artist of stained glass, closely studying Italian stained glass from the 14th and early 15th century to discover their techniques. He did so well that he was, erroneously, credited for rediscovering "the ancient manner" of painting on glass. He was sponsored by Leopold II, Grand Duke of Tuscany, developing new stained-glass techniques. He avoided a composition of many separate pieces of colored glass by keeping the lead lines to a minimum and painting directly on the larger panes of glass with many colours of enamel pigments. Shortly afterwards, he was asked (together with Tito Gordini) by patrons in Pisa to create stained-glass windows for the Pisa Baptistry.

He also put his technique to practical use in churches of Pisa (San Paolo, 1853), Livorno, Grosseto, Siena, Perugia, Lucca, and Padua. He also helped to restore and protect frescoes. He worked on the frescoes in the Camposanto of Pisa and the frescoes by Taddeo di Bartolo in the sacristy of the church of San Francesco, Pisa.

From 1869-1870, Botti was called to help restore the Giotto frescoes in the Scrovegni Chapel in Padua. He had been hired by recommendation of a technical committee, consisting of the Marquis and art critic Pietro Selvatico, the engineer Benvenuto Benvenisti and the sculptor Gradenigo. The work was then interrupted for a decade, and restarted in 1880 and continued till 1899 under Antonio Bertolli, a student of Botti.

In 1873, he was nominated inspector of the Gallerie of Venice, and in 1883, director. From 1874 to 1887, he was a resident academic of merit resident and professor of restorations and painting at the Academy of Fine Arts of Venice and in 1891 published the first catalogue of the works of art at the Gallerie of Venice.
