= Ida Botti Scifoni =

Italian artist (1812–1844)

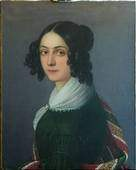
Ida Botti Scifoni Self-portrait

Ida Botti Scifoni (1812–1844) was an Italian painter, sculptor and designer. She was married to Felice Scifoni, and was a teacher and friend of Mathilde Bonaparte, Napoleon’s niece.

== Life and marriage ==
Ida Botti was born in Rome on 7 November 1812. She was raised in a middle-class family and excelled at an early age not only in painting portraits, which was socially accepted for a female painter, but also in painting more "masculine" historical and religious subjects.

Ida married Felice Scifoni, a notary, writer, and a member of the Carbonari, a secret revolutionary society committed to the unification of Italy. His political activities led to his arrest and subsequent exile after the Romagna Insurrection in 1831.

She died in Florence on 13 June 1844.

== Art and patronage ==
Scifoni’s exile brought the family to Florence, where Ida became the art teacher and friend of Mathilde Bonaparte. Niece of Napoleon, Mathilde was an established patroness of art and the wife of a Russian magnate, Anatoly Demidoff. The couple resided at the Villa in San Donato in Polverosa, which, under their patronage, became a meeting place for famous artists, intellectuals and scientists. This milieu led Ida Botti Scifoni to collaborate with poet Amelia Caini and with poet and patriot, Giovanni Battista Niccolini.

== Commemoration ==
Mathilde Bonaparte bequeathed Ida’s self-portrait to the Uffizi Gallery (it was later moved to the Galleria d'Arte Moderna at Palazzo Pitti) and commissioned Pietro Freccia to sculpt Ida’s funerary monument in the Basilica di Santa Croce, in Florence in 1848. In 2011, the self-portrait of Botti Scifoni was restored thanks to the contribution by Lions Club Firenze Michelangelo.
