= Concino Concini =

Italian politician (1569–1617)

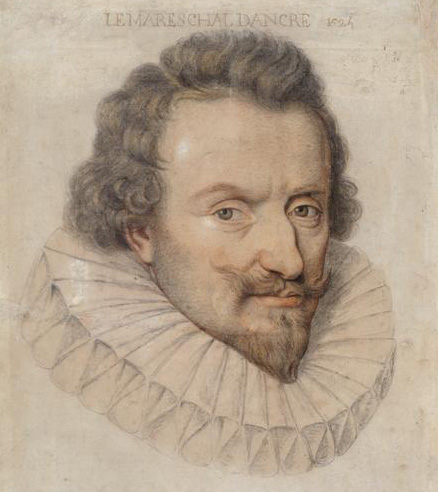
- Portrait by Daniel Dumonstier (1614)

Informal Chief Minister to the French Monarch
- In office 1610–1617
- Monarchs: Louis XIII; Marie de' Medici (regent)
- Preceded by: Maximilien de Béthune, duc de Sully
- Succeeded by: Armand-Jean du Plessis, Cardinal Richelieu (1624)

Personal details
- Born: 23 November 1569 Florence, Grand Duchy of Tuscany
- Died: 24 April 1617 (aged 47) Paris, Kingdom of France
- Spouse: Leonora Dori
- Parent: Giovan Battista Concini
- Education: University of Pisa
- Coat of arms

Concino Concini, 1st Marquis d'Ancre (23 November 1569 – 24 April 1617) was an Italian politician, best known for being a minister of Louis XIII of France, as the favourite of Louis's mother, Marie de' Medici, Queen regent of France. In 1617, he was killed at the behest of the King.

== Early life ==
Concino was born on 23 November 1569 to family of Giovan Battista Concini and Camilla Miniati in Florence. Concino's family boasted a history of service to powerful figures. His grandfather, Bartolomeo, held the position of first secretary to both Cosimo I and Francesco I. Additionally, Concino's brother, Cosimo, served as an ambassador to both the Holy Roman Empire and the Spanish court. As a younger son, Concino's path was not predetermined. He explored various options, studying at the University of Pisa and even contemplating a religious life as a Capuchin friar. He briefly served under the Cardinal of Lorraine before a pivotal opportunity arose in 1600.

During the marriage of Maria de' Medici to King Henry IV of France, Concino's uncle-in-law, Belisario Vinta, the Grand Duke's first secretary, suggested Concino accompany Maria to France to seek his fortune at the French court. Concino, eager to prove himself, embraced the chance. This marked the start of Concino's remarkable journey as a courtier, a rare achievement for an Italian during the late Renaissance. While others like financiers and officials had also found success in France, Concino's political career was a precursor to that of Cardinal Mazarin in the next generation, symbolizing a shift in the dynamics of power and influence.

== Marriage ==
On the journey to France, Concino began courting Leonora Dori, Maria de' Medici's closest confidante, and eventually won her heart. However, their path to establishing themselves at the French court was fraught with obstacles. Leonora's humble background, opposition from Concino's enemies, and King Henry IV's reluctance to have too many Italians in Maria's entourage all posed significant challenges.

Despite these hurdles, Concino and Leonora as Dame d'atours skillfully navigated the complexities of court life, strategically positioning themselves between the queen and the king's mistress. After months of negotiations, they were finally married on July 12, 1601, in Saint-Germain-en-Laye. The queen provided Leonora with a dowry of 70,000 tournois, and Concino was promised the prestigious position of premier maître d'hôtel (chief steward) to the queen. Their marriage contract, reflecting their shared ambition, stipulated a complete separation of assets.

Concino's success at the French court throughout his career was largely due to his wife's enduring influence over Queen Maria de' Medici. However, before King Henry IV's assassination in May 1610, Concino and Leonora led a relatively quiet life at court, their progress not particularly noteworthy. They had two children: Henry, baptized on July 8, 1603, with the queen as godmother, and Maria, baptized in March 1608, with the king as godfather, both ceremonies taking place in Saint-Germain.

== Career ==
Concino's success was evident in the rewards he received: 1,000 écus from the king in February 1602, a pension of 25,000 livres in 1603, and the completion of Leonora's dowry payment by the queen in December 1605. He held his initial position until April 1608, when he was promoted to first equerry to the queen without cost, while selling his previous position for 6,000 écus.

However, Concino faced challenges. In July 1605, Don Giovanni de' Medici, the queen's uncle and a skilled military figure, arrived at the French court, becoming a rival for the king's favor. Concino's vanity also displeased Ferdinando I de' Medici, who found the queen's excessive affection for Concino and Leonora "odious, not to say scandalous." As Don Giovanni's influence grew, Concino embarked on a journey to Florence and Rome in the spring and summer of 1606, mainly for personal reasons. In 1607, amidst rumors of his potential assassination, the cautious Concino had his horoscope read. Finally, in March 1608, Don Giovanni returned to Florence, having failed to leverage his influence.

By 1609, Concino had earned the privilege of traveling in the king's carriage, and Leonora was able to spend 14,000 écus on purchasing and restoring their rented palace in Faubourg Saint-Germain. Leonora adopted the surname Galigaï - a more prestigious Florentine family. Concini's personality, however, made him deeply unpopular with the nobles and the general populace. Chronicler Pierre de L'Estoile recounts an incident on May 4, 1610, just ten days before Henry IV's death, where Concini narrowly escaped death after entering the Parliament of Paris wearing his hat. The clerks of the Palace attacked him, along with the queen's pages who tried to defend him. When Concini complained to the king, the parliament sent ten councillors to remind him of their residence's immunity.

== Rise to power ==
After the assassination of Henry IV, Concino's ascent continued with his appointment as Conseiller d'État (counselor of state) on July 26, 1610, though he cautiously chose not to participate in ministerial meetings. The Concinis' financial gains were also significant. On September 7, 1610, they acquired the right to sell royal offices, valued at 384,500 tournois, although the royal treasury later received only a fraction of this amount. Just days later, on September 16, 1610, Leonora purchased the lands and titles of the marquisate of Ancre in Picardy for 330,000 livres from Humières-Crevant family, a transaction facilitated by the queen, who covered the cost and exempted the Concinis from taxes.

Concino's rise continued with a series of honors and appointments. On September 23, 1610, he was named governor of three frontier towns in Picardy (Péronne, Roye and Montdidier), marking his first political responsibility, which complemented his new status as a lord and landowner. Just four days later, he was appointed First Gentleman of the Chamber, with a substantial salary of 64,000 écus. In February 1611, Concino further expanded his influence in Picardy by becoming its lieutenant general. Rumors circulated that he was prepared to pay a hefty sum for the strategic fortress of Amiens. When the commander of Amiens died in June 1611, Concino was granted the position without cost. His social climb, initially precarious, was now fortified by a military stronghold. He also acquired the office of bailiff of Amiens and, in August 1611, accompanied by a retinue of fifty knights, he journeyed to inspect his new fortress and domain, making changes in command and rewarding the garrison.

== Height of power ==
In 1612, Concino was granted permission to build a small house connected to the Louvre through a garden, further solidifying his position at court. At times, he would emulate the behavior of other high-ranking figures, withdrawing to his estates or fortresses in a display of displeasure until he was summoned back into favor. During these periods, Leonora remained with the queen regent, ensuring their influence persisted. After 1613, the Concinis lived apart but maintained constant contact through letters and messengers. Concino's behavior grew increasingly princely. In 1616, Guido Bentivoglio described him as "an arrogant, proud man who scorns everyone." His extraordinary success bred not only envy but also hatred among many French people due to his perceived insolence. He maintained a bodyguard of forty men, each paid a thousand livres annually, whom he crudely referred to as his "coglioni di mille franchi" (thousand-franc balls).

He used his only daughter (Leonora being past childbearing age) as a bargaining chip in marriage proposals, aiming for powerful alliances with the Count of Soissons, Charles II, Duke of Elbeuf, and a nephew of Minister Villeroy, negotiating a substantial dowry of 300,000 livres. His importance was underscored by having both a French and an Italian secretary. His unique manner of speech, a blend of French and Italian, was noted by Bassompierre.

Concino's most significant promotion came unexpectedly on November 7, 1613, when he was appointed marshal of France. This prestigious position granted him the title of "excellence" and the privilege of being addressed as "mon cousin" by the king. However, he faced criticism for being a foreigner who had never experienced battle. Circumstances soon forced Concino to address this criticism. The persistent rebellion among the French nobility led him, two years after his appointment, to take command of an army himself. On October 28, 1615, he successfully captured the city of Clermont-en-Beauvaisis from Henri II, Prince of Condé. This victory resulted in the publication of three pamphlets praising his leadership, but it also made him the primary target of the rebels' animosity. When Treaty of Loudun was established in March 1616, one of the terms was that Marshal d'Ancre had to surrender the citadel of Amiens. Concino publicly agreed through a printed open letter to the queen, and indeed followed through on his promise a few months later. However, in the meantime, he was granted the citadel of Caen and the title of lieutenant-governor of Normandy, demonstrating the queen's unwavering support. Concino's ambition remained boundless. He offered a substantial sum of 600,000 livres for the position of colonel general of the Swiss Guard. Rumors even circulated at court that he aspired to the highest military office of Constable of France.

== Later life ==
Concino's early political maneuvers were indirect and somewhat chaotic, contrasting with the organized political opposition they faced. On May 22, 1615, the Parliament of Paris issued a protest seemingly directed at the Concinis, objecting to both the granting of fortresses to foreigners and the practice of Jewish doctors at court. The killing of a royal official by an Italian in Picardy in June 1615 sparked further unrest. The following year, tensions escalated as the animosity between Concino and the princes intensified. The Concinis were blamed for the arrest of the Prince of Condé on September 1, 1616, which led to their Parisian palace and Leonora's secretary's house being ransacked by a mob for two days.

Later in 1616, he obtained the disgrace of Nicolas Brûlart de Sillery and a new ministry was formed with Claude Mangot as keeper of the seals, Claude Barbin as Minister of Finance and Cardinal Richelieu as Foreign Affairs Minister. In response to the growing threats, Concino raised and equipped a formidable army of 6,000 infantry and 800 cavalry, consisting of both French and Liégeois soldiers. He fortified a town on the Normandy border, equipping it with cannons taken from the royal arsenal, which he boldly marked with his personal emblem. With this army, he engaged in a skirmish with his enemies, but the encounter proved inconclusive. Towards the end of 1616, his brother-in-law Sebastien d'Ori Galagai was appointed Archbishop of Tours without even becoming a bishop.

His daughter's death on January 2, 1617 particularly affected Concini. According to Bassompierre, Concini confided him and told that "Throughout my time in this world, I've come to understand that fate is not just about beginnings and rises, but also about falls and declines. I've observed that when someone reaches the peak of their success, they inevitably face a descent. And the higher and faster they climbed, the steeper and more dramatic their fall will be."

== Assassination ==
By 1617, Louis XIII, incited by his favourite Charles de Luynes, was tired of Concini's tutelage and his mother's regency. Nicolas de L'Hôpital, as head of the royal guards, received in the King's name the order to imprison him.

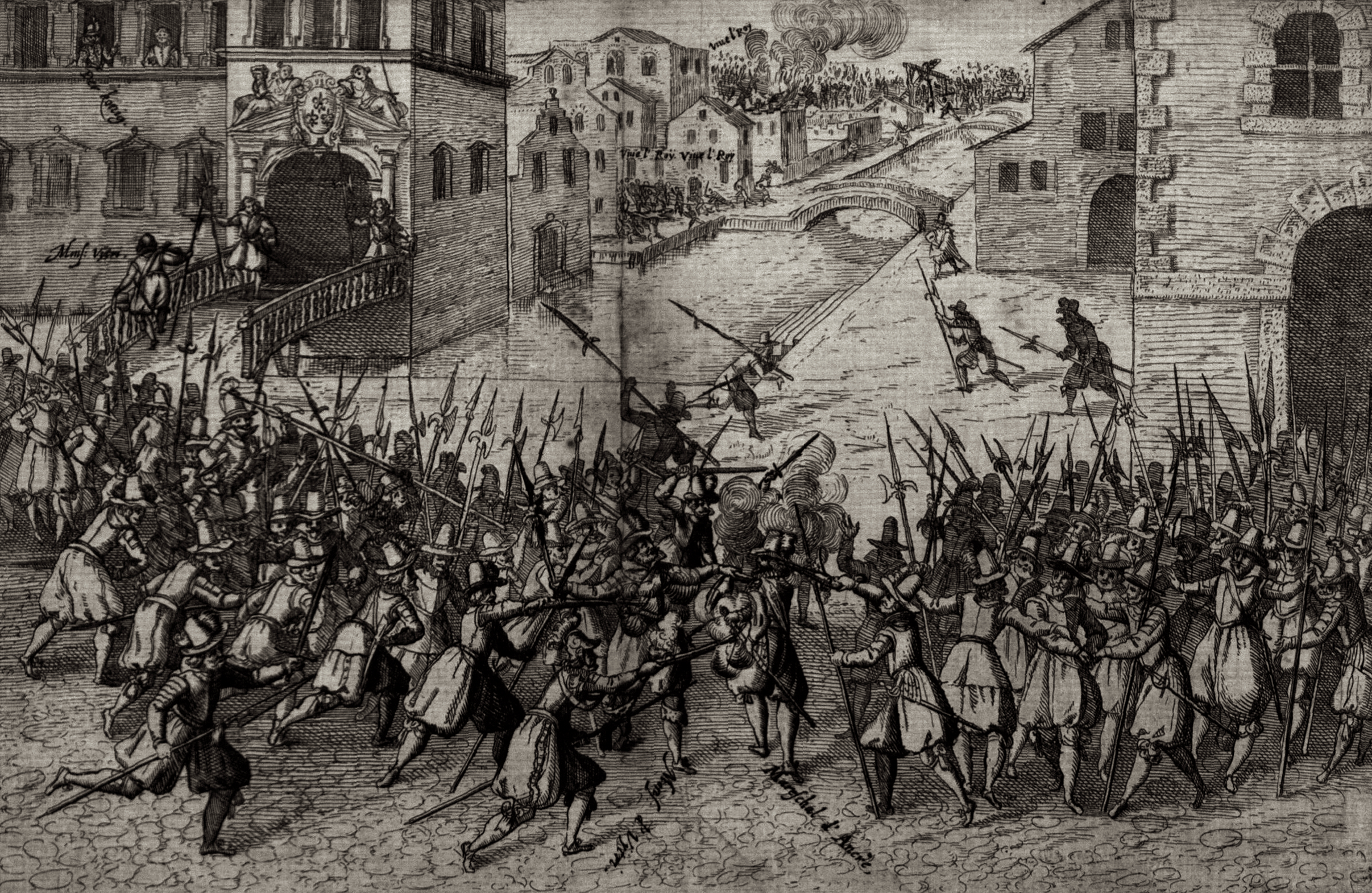
Contemporary depiction of the assassination of Concini

According to an anonymous account published in 1853 young Louis agreed that Concini could be killed if he resisted. Apprehended on the bridge of the Louvre castle, Concini was killed by guards after allegedly calling out "À moi !" ("To me!") for help, which was interpreted as resistance. The action was the result of a secret plot organised by Louis and de Luynes, which was then executed by L'Hôpital. Concini had to be eliminated because he was perceived by Louis as a menace—a powerful politician, having a personal army of 7,000 soldiers and important supporters and contacts among the aristocrats of France. After his murder, the Queen Mother was ordered to retire to Blois.

Concini's wife, Leonora Dori, was arrested, imprisoned in Blois and accused of sorcery. She was beheaded and her body subsequently burned at the stake on July 8 of the same year in Place de Grève, Paris. Their son Henry remained in prison for five years before being released, provided with a pension of 2,000 écus, and allowed to retire to Florence, where he resumed the title of Count of Penna and died of the plague in 1631. The Concinis' chattels and estates, in particular the castle of Lésigny and the palace of Rue de Tournon, were confiscated by King Louis XIII and given to Charles de Luynes.

In 1617–1618, over a hundred pamphlets hostile to Concini were published in France, many of which were translated into other languages.

== Legacy ==
Concino and Leonora supported the poet Giambattista Marino, who arrived in France in 1615 and described Concino a year later as "rich as a donkey." Marino dedicated two works to the Concinis in that year. Concino was also responsible for commissioning a bronze statue of Henry IV from Florence, intended for the new bridge over the Seine. Their protégé, the doctor Montalto, acquired several rare books for them, including medical texts in Hebrew. Concino's patronage, however, was peculiar. Leonora was frugal and not associated with any charitable acts, while Concino spent lavishly but in specific ways. Richelieu observed that Concino did little for his relatives or fellow Italians, suggesting his loyalty lay primarily with France.

It appears that Concino did not collect paintings or books, and no oil portrait of him exists, only a drawing. When their Parisian palace was looted in 1616, for which they were later compensated, reports mentioned masks, costumes, clothes, furniture, and jewels being thrown out of the windows, but few works of art. Concino often invested his wealth in semi-military embellishments, transforming his band of bravi into a private army.

== Arms ==
Arms
Description
Arms of the Concini family

1st and 4th quarters: Azure, a mount of three coupeaux Or, surmounted by three ostrich feathers Argent; 2nd and 3rd quarters: Argent, four chains Sable interlaced in saltire.

Arms of the Marquis of Ancre

Per pale and per fess of six: 1st and 6th quarters: Azure, a mount of three coupeaux Or, surmounted by three ostrich feathers Argent; 2nd and 4th quarters: Or, a double-headed eagle Sable; 3rd and 5th quarters: Argent, four chains Sable interlaced in saltire.

== In popular culture ==
He was portrayed by several actors throughout French film history:

- 1938: In the film Remontons les Champs-Élysées directed by Sacha Guitry, portrayed by Silvio de Pedrelli.
- 1946: In the film Le Capitan directed by Robert Vernay, portrayed by Aimé Clariond.
- 1960: In the episode Qui a tué Henri IV? of La Caméra explore le temps series by Alain Decaux and André Castelot, portrayed by Jean-Marie Fertey.
- 1960: In the film Le Capitan directed by André Hunebelle, portrayed by Arnoldo Foà.
- 1976: In the TV film L'assassinat de Concini directed by Gérard Vergez and Jean Chatenet, portrayed by Jacques Rispal.
- 1977: In the series Richelieu, le Cardinal de Velours, portrayed by Jean-Pierre Bernard.
- 2019: In Season 3 of La Guerre des trônes, portrayed by Ilario Calvo.

== Sources ==
- Duccini, Hélène (1991-01-01). Concini: Grandeur et misère du favori de Marie de Médicis [Concini: Grandeur and misery of Marie de Medici's favorite] (in French). FeniXX. ISBN 978-2-402-61569-3.

Preceded by Maximilien de Béthune, Duke of Sully	Informal Chief Minister to the French Monarch; 1610–1617	Succeeded by vacant Title next held by Cardinal Richelieu
