= Matteo Botti =

Italian scientific instrument maker

Matteo Botti (ca. 1570–1621) was an Italian scientific instrument maker.

Botti came from a Cremonese family on which Cosimo I de' Medici (1519–1574) conferred Florentine citizenship. He was a member of the Accademia degli Alterati and the Accademia Fiorentina. He undertook various missions abroad as an ambassador for Ferdinand I (1549–1609) and Cosimo II (1590–1621). In 1591, he was made a Knight of the Order of Saint Stephen.
