= Belisario Vinta =

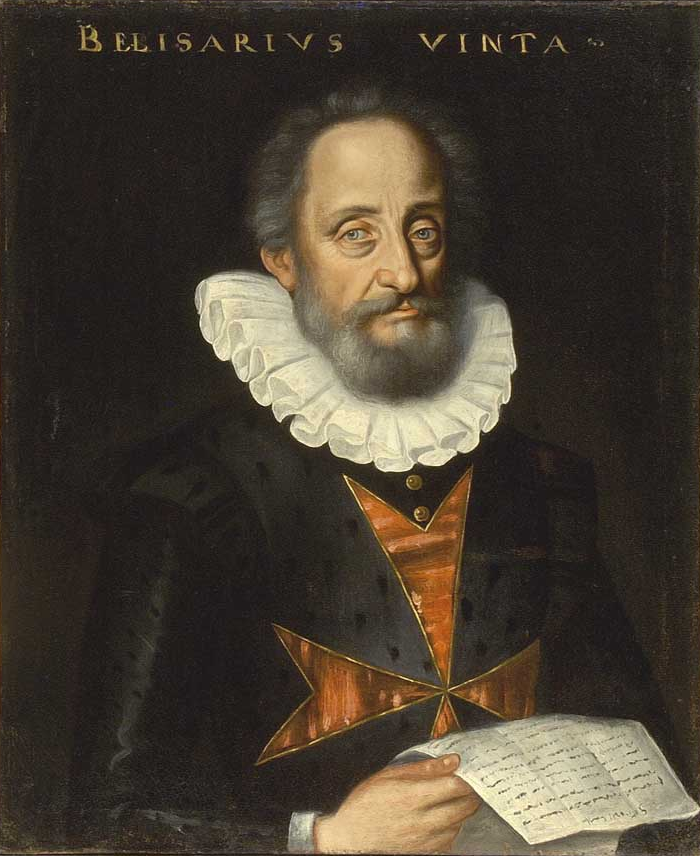
- Belisario Vinta as a knight of St. Stephen, 1600

First Secretary of State of Grand Duchy of Tuscany
- In office 5 January 1610 – 16 October 1613
- Appointed by: Cosimo II de' Medici
- Preceded by: Pietro Usimbardi
- Succeeded by: Curzio Picchena

Personal details
- Born: October 13, 1542 Volterra, Duchy of Florence
- Died: October 16, 1613 (aged 71) Florence, Grand Duchy of Tuscany
- Education: University of Pisa

Belisario Vinta (13 October 1542, Volterra – 15 or 16 October 1613, Florence) was an Italian statesman, knight and diplomat who served the Grand Duchy of Tuscany. Vinta held various high-ranking positions under the Medici family, particularly during the reigns of Ferdinando I and Cosimo II.

== Early life and education ==
Belisario Vinta was born into a noble family. His parents were Francesco Vinta and Elisabetta Incontri. He was the third of four children, with two elder brothers, Ferdinando and Paolo, and a younger brother, Emilio. His brothers, Emilio and Paolo, also held prominent positions in service of the Medici family, with Paolo Vinta becoming fiscal auditor in 1605.

Vinta's education was strongly influenced by his mother, who introduced him to classical literature, including the works of Virgil. He furthered his studies under Dionisio Lippi, who praised him as a "doctissimus adulescens" (Latin for "a very learned young man") for his passion for classical culture. In 1566, Vinta earned a degree in both civil and canon law from the University of Pisa, later becoming an auditor at the institution. He was made a knight of the Order of Saint Stephen on 7 July 1567.

== Diplomatic career ==
His diplomatic career began in 1568 when he was appointed to accompany ambassador Ludovico Antinori to the imperial court, following the death of his brother Emilio during the mission. Vinta played a key role in negotiations concerning the grand ducal title granted by Pope Pius V to Cosimo I, which had sparked protests from Ferrara and Mantua. He continued in this role until 1574.

Vinta carried out several diplomatic missions for the Medici, including trips to Venice to negotiate financial matters with the Fugger family (in 1575), to Innsbruck and the imperial court for marriage negotiations. His frequent travels to Rome involved protecting Medici interests, particularly during the conclaves of 1572 and 1585. He made several trips to Mantua between 1579 and 1584 to negotiate the dynastic union between Eleonora de’ Medici and Duke Vincenzo Gonzaga.

Under Francesco de' Medici, Vinta distanced himself from the court factions dominated by Bianca Cappello and her brother, Vittorio. However, he remained active in government, handling relations with Italian states after the retirement of Bartolomeo Concini in 1576. Vinta consolidated his ties to the Concini family by marrying Bartolomeo's niece, Alessandra Bartolini, in 1577.

=== Under Ferdinando I ===
When Ferdinando I succeeded his brother in 1587, he reorganized the secretarial offices, placing Vinta in charge of foreign relations with several key Italian states. By 1591, Vinta had effectively taken over from Pietro Usimbardi as the head of government offices. His responsibilities included managing relations with Venice, Milan, Ferrara, and Bologna, as well as overseeing ducal properties, public health, and the food supply. He was made the Grand Chancellor of the Order of Saint Stephen in 1596.

Between 1590 and 1592, he made several trips to Rome for three conclaves held in quick succession. In 1590, he accompanied Emilio Cavalieri and Cipriano Saracinelli to observe the conclave that elected Urban VII, and soon after, for the one that elected Gregory XIV. Vinta stressed the importance of influencing conclaves after Ferdinando I adopted an anti-Spanish policy. When Gregory XIV died in October 1591, he went back to Rome for the conclave that elected Innocent IX. In 1592, following the pope's death, he and Cavalieri were sent to oversee the conclave that elected Clement VIII. In this conclave and the first one of 1605 (leading to Leo XI's election), Vinta's political skills were vital in coordinating with the shrewd Grand Duke Ferdinando, who orchestrated political moves from Florence. He worked alongside Medici ambassador Giovanni Niccolini.

Vinta also played a pivotal role in Tuscany's rapprochement with France, particularly by supporting Henry of Navarre (later Henry IV) and negotiating the Peace of Vervins, which led to the return of Château d'If to France. He accompanied Princess Maria de' Medici to France in 1600 for her marriage to Henry IV and remained closely involved in managing the financial settlement between the French Crown and Tuscany. Accompanying him was his nephew, Concino Concini, who stayed with the queen in France. Vinta urged Henry IV to keep the Marquisate of Saluzzo, but when the Peace of Lyon in 1601 led to France ceding Saluzzo and giving up its Italian territory, Vinta was deeply disappointed. He wrote to Florence, expressing his disbelief that the king would make such a decision.

Just a short time before Ferdinando I died, Vinta was appointed senator on January 5, 1609.

=== Under Cosimo II ===
Following the death of Ferdinando I, Cosimo II maintained Vinta as First Secretary of State, formalizing his role. Vinta continued to guide Tuscan foreign policy, particularly in negotiations surrounding the double royal marriage involving Louis XIII of France and Anne of Austria, as well as the future Philip IV of Spain and Elisabeth of Bourbon. Vinta's experience and political acumen were crucial during this period of diplomacy. He bought Palazzo Tempi from Torrigiani family and created the facades on the via de Bardi side, including a portal with the bust of Cosimo II in 1609. Vinta also managed relations with Galileo Galilei, advising the scientist on naming the moons of Jupiter "Medicea Sydera" in honor of the Medici family.

== Later years ==
He continued to serve under Cosimo II but, by 1609, was described by the Venetian ambassador Francesco Badoer as advanced in age and nearing the end of his career. One of Vinta's final political actions was to refuse a request from the Duke of Lerma to establish a permanent Spanish ambassador in Florence. Vinta died on October 14 or 16, 1613, and was buried in the Church of Santa Croce in Florence. He was succeeded by Curzio Picchena. Two funeral orations were delivered in his honor, one by the theologian Graziano d’Avezzano and another by Alessandro Minerbetti, commissioned by Grand Duchess Christina of Lorraine.

== Legacy ==
In 1576, he translated several works by Giovan Battista Cini and Vincenzo Borghini into Latin. He maintained correspondence with Giovan Battista Guarini and, in 1603, joined the Sienese Accademia dei Filomati. According to Matteo Botti, Medici ambassador to Paris during Cosimo II's reign, the secretary Nicolas de Neufville had written referring to Vinta as one of the most capable ministers of the time, comparable only to Don Juan de Idiáquez in Spain and Robert Cecil, Earl of Salisbury in England.

== Sources ==
- Fusai, Giuseppe (1905). Belisario Vinta ministro e consigliere di stato dei Granduchi Ferdinando I e Cosimo II dè Medici 1542-1613 [Belisario Vinta minister and state councilor of the Grand Dukes Ferdinando I and Cosimo II de Medici 1542-1613] (in Italian). Florence: Libreria Gozzini.
