= Bartolomeo Concini =

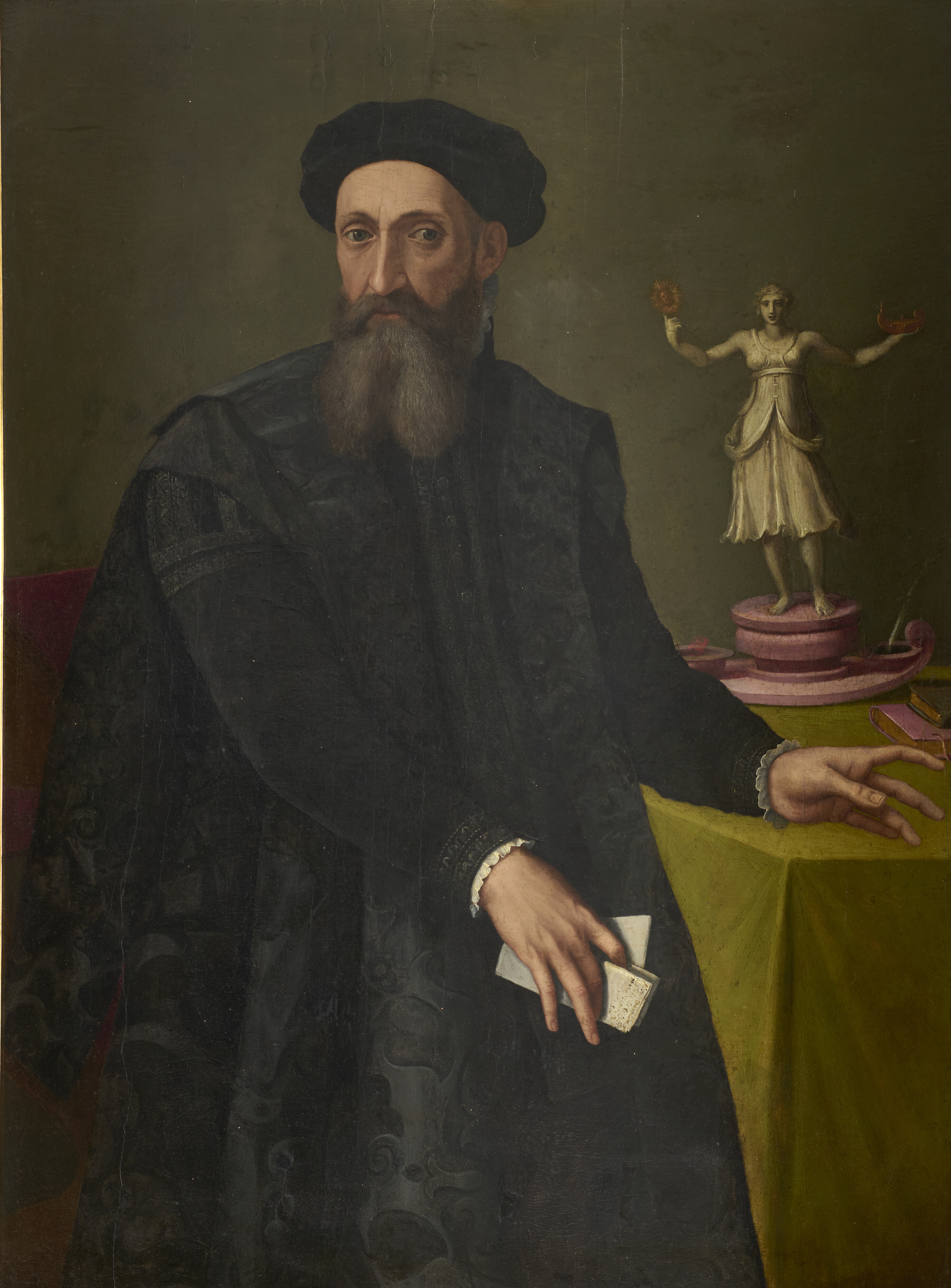
- Portrait of Bartolomeo Concini by a follower of Bronzino

First Secretary of State of Grand Duchy of Tuscany
- In office 1570–1576 Serving with Lelio Torelli
- Appointed by: Cosimo I de' Medici
- Succeeded by: Antonio Serguidi

Personal details
- Born: 1507 Terranuova Bracciolini, Republic of Florence
- Died: January 18, 1578 (aged 70–71) Florence, Grand Duchy of Tuscany

Bartolomeo Concini (1507, Terranuova Bracciolini – January 18, 1578, Florence) was an influential political figure and diplomat in the service of Cosimo I de' Medici, Duke of Florence, and later Grand Duke of Tuscany. Born in Terranuova Bracciolini in the Valdarno near Arezzo, he rose from humble beginnings to become one of the most trusted advisors to Cosimo I. His descendants, before the family's extinction in 1632, would continue his political and diplomatic career at the grand ducal court, forge alliances with prominent city families, and hold important political and diplomatic positions for a long time.

== Early life ==
Concini was born to Giovan Battista di Matteo, a farmer, in 1507. He had a brother called Carlo Concini. Despite his modest origins, Concini quickly rose through the ranks in Florentine society. Initially working as a notary, he was recommended by Filippo Strozzi to Francesco Vettori around 1540. Soon after, he entered the service of Iacopo V Appiani, lord of Piombino. Concini's diplomatic skills and political acumen (he prevented Appiani from allying France) brought him to the attention of Cosimo I de' Medici, who employed him as a trusted secretary and envoy around 1545.

== Career ==
=== Under Cosimo I ===
His initial assignment for the duke took place between 1547 and 1549. Cosimo dispatched him as an ambassador to Brussels - the court of Emperor Charles V, to defend the duke's political actions in Italy. There, Cosimo had been accused of instigating the recent turmoil in Siena to expand his territory. Concini effectively countered these accusations, asserting that Cosimo's actions were always guided by good intentions, aiming to support the emperor's prestige and maintain his influence in Italy.

=== Conquest of Siena ===
Following the 1552 conspiracy orchestrated by Nicola III Orsini, Count of Pitigliano, and funded by France, which led to the removal of the Spanish garrison from Siena, Concini was once again sent to Charles V, this time accompanied by Pier Filippo Pandolfini. Concini took credit for persuading the emperor that Cosimo was not involved in the events in Siena, instead placing the blame entirely on Diego Hurtado de Mendoza, 4th Count of Saldaña, the Spanish commander in July 1552.

He was instrumental in convincing Charles V to initiate war against the Republic of Siena in 1553. His memoirs highlight his negotiations with the emperor in Brussels regarding the Sienese war effort. Moreover, Concini maintained close contact with Gian Giacomo Medici during the war, participating in negotiations for the surrender of towns like Lucignano and Monteriggioni, and ensuring the duke was kept abreast of all developments. As Concini became increasingly involved in foreign policy, his influence at court grew. Many people attributed Cosimo's successes to Concini's intelligence and counsel. Even the annexation of Siena to the duchy was partly credited to Concini, who later claimed to have urged Cosimo's wife, Eleonora of Toledo, to lobby the emperor to grant Siena to the Medici instead of the Carafa family.

=== Papal affairs ===
In the latter part of the 1550s, Concini also dealt with strained relations between Tuscany and the Papal States. Dispatched to Naples in 1556 to discuss the re-entry of Florentine exiles and war-related issues between the Papal States and the Duke of Alba, Concini was apprehended on his journey back under orders from Pope Paul IV (a member of Carafa family). Despite being subjected to torture, he refused to divulge any state secrets. His release was eventually secured thanks to the intervention of Cosimo's envoy, Giovan Battista Ricasoli.

By the close of the 1550s, Concini had cemented his place as one of Cosimo's most dependable advisors on matters of foreign policy. Even though Lelio Torelli officially held the title of First Secretary, it was Concini who was effectively in charge of Tuscany's foreign relations. His sphere of influence encompassed relations with both the Papal States and other Italian courts. Notably, he played a crucial role in enhancing ties with the Papacy, particularly during the 1559 conclave that resulted in the election of Pius IV. Concini's diplomatic skills also led to successful negotiations for cardinal hats for Cosimo's sons Giovanni (in 1560) and Ferdinando (in 1563), as well as for Angelo Nicolini (in 1565). Famously, Concini redacted the 1561–1564 edition of Storia d'Italia (History of Italy) by Francesco Guicciardini and deleted a passage on the origins of the temporal power of the popes.

=== Later career ===
Concini played a crucial part in the creation of the Order of Saint Stephen. Furthermore, he orchestrated the marriage between Lucrezia de’ Medici and Alfonso II d’Este in 1560. In 1565, Concini was again sent to the imperial court in Vienna, this time accompanying the duke's son, Francesco, to participate in the negotiations for his marriage to Joanna of Austria.

Importantly, he was also involved in securing the grand ducal title for Cosimo from Pope Pius V in 1569. At the time of the ceremony, held in Florence on December 13, 1569, during which the papal bull granting Cosimo the title of Grand Duke was read, Concini appeared by 1570 as one of the first secretary alongside Torelli, a position he held until his death. Concini's personal fortune also grew immensely, as did his influence at court. By 1570, he was one of the wealthiest men in Florence, owning 96 estates in Valdarno. Another important official recognition was granted to Concini in 1572 when he was exempted from all taxes for the merits earned at the Medici court.

One of Concini's final significant diplomatic missions took place in 1572. Following the death of Pius V, he was dispatched, along with Belisario Vinta, to Rome for the conclave. Their objective was to "prevent untrustworthy subjects and to favor the exaltation of Cardinal Buoncompagno," who was subsequently elected pope as Gregory XIII.

After 1576, perhaps also due to advanced age, Concini's influence at court began to decline, while his place was taken by his son-in-law and protege Antonio Serguidi. Concini died in Florence on January 18, 1578.

== Family ==
After growing his influence, Concini's ancestors started to be associated with the ancient Ghibelline family of the Counts of Penna, who were exiled from Florence in 1303 and settled in Terranuova. Increasingly, Concini was referred to in official documents as a Florentine patrician. This fabricated connection to a noble lineage was eventually legitimized by court historian Scipione Ammirato, who included it in his work on Florentine noble families. However, in his attempt to make the Concini family's genealogy more believable, Ammirato inadvertently exposed its shaky foundation. He mentioned having "seen and read Latin epistles not at all unworthy of being despised" written by Concini's father, who had been a peasant in Valdarno.

Bartolomeo Concini married Margherita Bartoli, sister of Cosimo Bartoli who was ambassador of Florence in Venice and whose father Matteo Bartoli was podestà of Pistoia in 1513. Their children were:

- Giovan Battista Concini (1532–1605), who was licentiate in canon law from the University of Pisa in 1560, was first secretary of the Grand Duke of Tuscany in 1576. He was married to Camilla d'Antonio Miniati and fathered Concino Concini.
- Maria Ginevra Concini married to Bartolomeo Bartolini Baldelli
- Elisabetta Concini — married to Antonio Bartolini Baldelli (1530–1561), then to Antonio Serguidi
  - Alessandra Bartolini Baldelli — married to Belisario Vinta in 1577
- Aurelia Concini — married to Cosimo Canigiani
- Camilla Concini — married to Belisario Vinta
