= Flavia Peretti =

Italian noblewoman, Duchess of Bracciano (1574–1606)

- Duchess of Bracciano
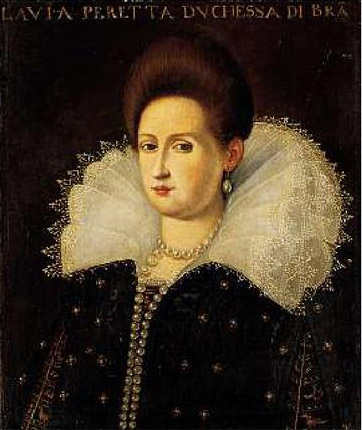

- Coat of arms
- Reign: 20 March 1589 – 14 September 1606
- Predecessor: Vittoria Accoramboni
- Successor: Isabella Appiani
- Born: Flavia Damasceni; 1574; Rome, Papal State (now Lazio, Italy)
- Died: 14 September 1606 (aged 31–32); Florence, Republic of Florence (now Tuscany, Italy)
- Noble family: Peretti (by birth); Orsini (by marriage)
- Spouse: Virginio Orsini, Duke of Bracciano (m. 1589)
- Issue Among others: Paolo Giordano II, 3rd Duke of Bracciano; Alessandro Orsini; Maria Felicia, Duchess of Montmorency
- Father: Fabio Damasceni
- Mother: Maria Felicita Peretti

Flavia Damasceni Peretti, Duchess of Bracciano (1574 – 14 September 1606) was an Italian noblewoman, niece of Pope Sixtus V and duchess consort of Bracciano as wife of Virginio Orsini. She is also known as a patroness of several poets, writers and musicians.

== Biography ==
Flavia was born in 1574, Rome, as the daughter of Fabio Damasceni and Maria Felicita Peretti. She had a sister, Orsina, and two brothers, Alessandro and Michele. Her maternal grandmother was the sister of Cardinal Felice Peretti (future Pope Sixtus V, 1585–1590). Cardinal Peretti adopted Flavia and her siblings, gave them his surname and took care of their education, having them raised by Lucrezia Salviati, natural daughter of Cardinal Bernardo Salviati and wife of Latino Orsini. Orsina married Marcantonio Colonna, Duke of Tagliacozzo; Alessandro became Cardinal and Michele became Prince of Venafro.

Flavia, described as a blonde girl of remarkable beauty, was asked in marriage by Ranuccio I Farnese, Duke of Parma; and by Charles I of Guise, Duke of Guise. However, Ferdinando de' Medici, brother of Francesco I of Tuscany, gave her in marriage to Virginio Orsini, Duke of Bracciano. Virginio's mother, Isabella de' Medici, was Ferdinando and Francesco's sister.

The two were married by proxy on 20 March 1589. The ceremony was celebrated by Fabio Biondi, Patriarch of Jerusalem, and the bride's dowry was 100,000 scudi. At least two songs were composed for the occasion: Nelle nozze degl’ill.mi sig.ri il sig. don Verginio Orsino e la signora donna Flavia Peretta of Baldo Catani and Nelle felicissime nozze de… don Verginio Orsino… & donna Flavia Peretta of Giovanni Girolamo Fiorelli. The couple had twelve children, nine of whom survived.

Flavia was passionate about music, singing and dancing, and she created a musical salon together with her brother Alessandro. In addition to performing herself, she hosted virtuosos such as Luca Marenzio, Vittoria Archilei and Francesco Rasi. Her interests also included weaving and the art of women's hairdressing.

Several compositions were dedicated to her, the work, among others, by Giovan Francesco Buoni, under the pseudonym of Academico Sfregiato; Ercole Marescotti, under the pseudonym of Hercole Filogenio; and Torquato Tasso, with the pseudonym of Uranio Felice, who dedicated her Tempio fabricato da diversi coltissimi, e nobilissimi ingegni.

After 1590 Flavia and her husband lived in Florence, guests at Palazzo Pitti. Flavia was received at the Medici court and made friends with various ladies, including Christina of Lorraine, Margherita Aldobrandini, Virginia de' Medici and Laura d'Este. She took part in all the social events of the period, including the marriage of Maria de' Medici to the French King Henry IV.

Meanwhile, she assumed the administrative responsibilities of the Duchy of Bracciano.

Flavia died at thirty-two during her twelfth delivery, on 14 September 1606, giving birth to a stillborn daughter.

== Issue ==
By her marriage, she had twelve children, eight sons and four daughters:

- Paolo Giordano II Orsini (1591 – 24 May 1656). III Duke of Bracciano. In 1622 he married Isabella Appiani, ruler princess of Piombino, and became a Prince of Holy Roman Empire. By his wife he had no issue, but had a natural son, Ippolito.
- Alessandro Orsini (1592 – 22 August 1626). Cardinal.
- Isabella Orsini (1597–1623). In 1612 she married Cesare II Gonzaga, Duke of Guastalla. She had two sons, Ferrante III and Vespasiano.
- Maria Felicia Orsini (12 November 1600 – 5 June 1666). She married Henri II, Duke of Montmorency, without issue. After being widowed in 1632, she took the vows.
- Camilla Orsini (29 July 1603 – post 1658). In 1619 she married Marcantonio II Borghese, Prince of Sulmona, and had a son, Paolo. After being widowed in 1658, she became a nun and, after her death, she was declared venerable.
- Ferdinando Orsini (? – 4 March 1660). IV Duke of Bracciano. On 3 November 1610 he married Giustiniana Orsini of San Gemini and had six children: Virginio, Flavia (died in 1645), Flavio (7 November 1620 – 5 April 1698; V and last Duke of Bracciano), Lelio (1622–1696, humanist and musician), Giovanna (1624–1702, in 1644 she became nun with name Ippolita Virginia) and Ippolita.
- Cosimo Orsini. Military.
- Virginio Orsini. Discalced Carmelite.
- Francesco Orsini. Jesuit.
- Carlo Orsini. Died in infancy.
- Raimondo Orsini. Died in infancy.
- Stillborn daughter (14 September 1606). Her mother died in childbirth.
