= Troilo =

Troilo is an Italian given name or surname, a variant of the Latin name Troilus. Notable people with the name include:

== Given name ==
- Troilo I de' Rossi (1462–1521), Italian condottiero and marquess
- Troilo Agnesi (fl. 1482–1510), Italian Roman Catholic prelate
- Troilo Orsini (1547–1577), Italian nobleman

== Surname ==
- Aníbal Troilo (1914–1975), Argentine tango musician
- Ettore Troilo (1898–1974), Italian Resistance leader during World War II
- Mariano Troilo (born 2003), Argentine footballer
