= Troilo Orsini =

Italian nobleman, Florentine ambassador during the reign of Grand Duke Cosimo I

- Born: 1547; Monterotondo
- Died: 2 December 1577 (aged 29–30); Paris
- Noble family: Orsini
- Father: Paolo Emilio Orsini
- Occupation: Ambassador, condottiere

Anastasio Fontebuoni: Troilo Orsini brings aid from Cosimo I de' Medici in Florence for King Charles IX of France

Troilo Orsini (1547–1577) was an Italian nobleman belonging to the illustrious House of Orsini. He is known for his service as a Florentine ambassador between 1568 and 1574, as well as his alleged relationship with Princess Isabella de' Medici.

He is remembered for his polite demeanour, good looks, and his ability to enliven social gatherings with conversation and music, which likely played a significant role in his diplomatic success. "He was a man who was elegant in all his endeavours, extremely handsome, a great entertainer, a true courtier, the friend of all the ladies and gentlemen" - wrote a contemporary of Troilo.

As a young man, Troilo came to Florence as part of his cousin, Paolo Giordano Orsini's retinue, and stayed in the Medici court to safeguard the honour of Princess Isabella de' Medici, Paolo Giordano's young wife who remained in Florence while Paolo Giordano returned to Rome. Possibly due to Isabella's influence on her father, Grand Duke Cosimo I de' Medici, and Troilo's own family ties to the Medici, the young Orsini served as a Florentine ambassador for a decade, advancing Medici interests in the royal courts of Europe.

Following the death of Cosimo I, Troilo fell out with the new Grand Duke Francesco de' Medici and fled to the court of Queen Mother Catherine de' Medici in Paris. In 1575 he became gentleman of the King's chamber, serving King Henry III.

On the 30th of November 1577, he was shot in Saint-Germain-des-Pres on the orders of Francesco de Medici, and succumbed to his injuries two days later.

Orsini is depicted in a painting by Anastasio Fontebuoni titled 'Troilo Orsini is received by Queen Mother Catherine de' Medici and King Charles IX', commissioned by Marie de' Medici in 1620 for the Luxembourg Palace in Paris and as part of a series of paintings intended to celebrate the glory of the Medici family and the royal house of France.

== Early life ==
Born in 1547 in Monterotondo, Troilo was the eldest son of Paolo Emilio Orsini, from the Monterotondo Orsini branch - the same branch Clarice Orsini, wife of Lorenzo de' Medici, originated from, which made Troilo a distant cousin to the ruling Medici family members at the time.

Murphy writes that similarly to many Roman noble families, the Monterotondo Orsini never really recovered from the Sack of Rome in 1527 and were struggling financially. After his father's death, as the eldest son, Troilo found himself responsible for his younger brother Mario and sister Emilia. As was customary, the head of the Monterotondo clan and Troilo's uncle, Giordano, expected Troilo to contribute to the upkeep of the estate.

In 1559, he was raising money to establish his own company to fight in the Wars of Religion in France, where he also took part in several military campaigns.

Some time in the early 1560s, due to a period of ceasefire and lack of military assignments, Troilo, an accomplished condottiere by this time, was sent to Florence accompanying his cousin Paolo Giordano Orsini, who had married Princess Isabella de' Medici, the daughter of Cosimo I, the Duke of Florence, in 1556.

Due to Paolo Giordano's reputation as a spendthrift and a lover of debauchery, Cosimo had requested that Isabella and her dowry remain in Florence, while Paolo Giordano returned to Rome and relied on Troilo to oversee his wife's behaviour.

== Diplomatic career under Cosimo I de Medici ==
"No Orsini of his generation was more determined to succeed on his own merits than Troilo Orsini." - writes Murphy. Earning the trust of Cosimo I, and possibly with Isabella's help, Orsini embarked on diplomatic missions from 1568 onwards. In 1568, he represented the Medici family in Munich at the wedding of William V of Bavaria and Renata of Lorraine. His instructions were to reaffirm the shared interests stemming from the dynastic ties formed by the marriage of Prince Francesco de' Medici to Joanna of Austria.

Through Orsini, the Medici negotiated loans for France, which was embroiled in the Wars of Religion. In 1569, he was dispatched to King Charles IX to address the stalled negotiations for a 100,000 scudi loan. Additionally, he had to advocate for the prestige of the Tuscan State, drawing on Catherine de' Medici's origins, "as Florence was the homeland of Her Majesty the Queen and, by extension, the origin of all their Majesties and Highnesses".

In October of the same year, he returned to France for the wedding of the King Charles IX to Elizabeth of Austria, with the task of conveying Pope Pius V's intention to confer the title of Grand Duke upon Cosimo de' Medici. He was also sent to France in 1570 and 1571, performing unofficial but politically and economically significant functions, including the granting of loans.

In 1573, he was in Paris again to congratulate Duke Henry of Anjou on his election as king of Poland after the Jagiellonian dynasty's extinction, expressing the grand duke's desire "to share similar fortunes with their most Christian Majesties in many respects".

Rumours circulated that he had also offered a substantial loan on behalf of the Grand Duke to cover Henry's journey to Poland.

In April 1574, he was dispatched to Tyrol, the Imperial Court, Bohemia, Hungary, and, ultimately, the Polish court. His mission was to announce Cosimo I's passing and Francesco's ascension, with the expectation of continued financial support for France's involvement in the Wars of Religion. During this mission, Orsini, found himself embroiled in a precedence dispute with Battista Guarini, the ambassador of Ferrara. This dispute was rooted in an ongoing issue that pitted the Duchy of Tuscany against Ferrara. The incident concluded unfavourably for Orsini.

The mission in Krakow spanned a little over a month. Orsini left Poland shortly after Henry, who had been summoned to assume the French throne following Charles IX's demise and had relinquished the Polish crown. Upon leaving Krakow, he reunited with the king in Venice and together with the Medici envoy Sigismondo de Rossi, he represented the Grand Duke at the Venetian festivities in Henry's honour.

== Later years and death ==
Upon his return to Florence in 1574, he found himself facing altered political dynamics. Cosimo I's death had deprived him of his main support. The new Grand Duke, Francesco, distrusted him and sought to prevent him from establishing a close relationship with his influential brother, Cardinal Ferdinando. Allegedly, he blamed Orsini for protecting an individual accused of killing one of his servants.

Subsequently, he accused Orsini of murder and, on February 15, 1576, sentenced him in absentia, confiscating his assets. Orsini had already sought refuge in France, where he was appointed gentleman of the chamber by Henry III.

Nevertheless, the reasons behind this reversal of fortune remain somewhat obscure, as do the true motives behind his journey to Paris. After departing Florence, he maintained a correspondence with Bartolomeo Concini, Francesco's secretary, Ferdinando de' Medici, and the Grand Duke himself.

On November 30, 1577, in Paris, he fell victim to an arquebus attack and succumbed to his injuries two days after.

The primary culprit behind the murder was Ambrogio Tremazzi, accompanied by an individual named Ieronimo Savorano. In a letter addressed to Antonio Serguidi, secretary of Grand Duke Francesco, Tremazzi confessed to receiving the assignment to assassinate Orsini from Count Ridolfo Isolani and Don Pietro de' Medici, the youngest son of Cosimo I.

Tremazzi painstakingly reconstructed the steps taken to approach Troilo, whose access proved challenging due to Troilo's role as a gentleman of the chamber to Henry III, spending significant time at the royal court. According to the contemporary account of the nuncio in Paris, Antonio Maria Salviati, Orsini was aware of his assailant's identity but chose not to reveal it, even on his deathbed, and forgave the individual.

The news of the murder garnered considerable attention in the reports of ambassadors and notices. The name of a Caracciolo, of Neapolitan origins and a member of the Order of the Knights of St. Stephen, was also mentioned as a possible perpetrator. However, widespread suspicion circulated regarding the involvement of Sinolfo Saracini, the grand ducal ambassador in France, and the ducal secretary Curzio Picchena, who were not strangers to orchestrating ambushes against Florentine exiles. A Florentine exile named Bernardo Girolami accused them to the King, leading to a search of the ambassador's residence, but the investigations yielded no results.

The historical reconstructions of the subsequent period are connected to the different readings of the story: Orsini's diplomatic missions (particularly those in France) are explained by some with Cosimo I's desire to distance Orsini from his daughter; by others with political purposes and diplomatic representation. By some, the killing was seen as extreme revenge by Grand Duke Francesco after the death of his sister Isabella, killed at the behest of her husband Paolo Giordano who had discovered her betrayal with Orsini or, instead, with political reasons, linked either to the campaign to eliminate the Florentine exiles in France (Galluzzi, 1781; Diaz, 1987), or to the ambiguity of the position that Orsini had assumed in France, due to which he would have lost the trust of the Grand Duke

Several years later, Queen Catherine de' Medici expressed her dissatisfaction with Orsini's murder to Andrea Albertani, dispatched from Florence to recover a substantial credit. During a period of political tension with Tuscany, Queen Catherine disapproved of the systematic elimination of Florentine exiles in France, as it jeopardised the king's sovereignty.

== Personal life ==
The reconstruction of Orsini's profile is closely tied to the various interpretations offered by historians regarding his relationship with Princess Isabella de' Medici. From the time of the events, an opinion circulated, later echoed in recent studies, suggesting that Orsini might have been Isabella's lover. Most historians believe that sometime between 1564 and 1566, a clandestine romantic relationship developed between the two, with their affair lasting until Troilo's banishment, and said to have contributed to both of their deaths.

Historians subscribing to the hypothesis of a romantic entanglement between Orsini and Isabella refer to the collection of letters exchanged between Orsini and an unidentified woman. These missives confirm the existence of an illicit liaison with a married woman of esteemed Florentine lineage who ardently professed her affection for him ("from the first day that I spoke to him I was so excited about him that I have never lived quietly, and your lordship be sure that I love him and adore him as much as possible").

Murphy, in her research, presents a compelling array of evidence connecting these letters to a married woman of the highest echelons of the Medici court, who could only have been Isabella (her sisters having already passed away). She posits that naturally, given the perils involved, Isabella would have taken extraordinary measures to conceal her true identity, which would have included refraining from signing her name or employing her own handwriting. Nevertheless, it remains inconclusive that this mysterious woman was, indeed, Isabella.

That said, Murphy also documents an incident from December 1574, as relayed by Giuliano de' Ricci, in which Troilo wounded and killed Torello de Nobili da Fermo, a member of Pietro de' Medici's inner circle, 'because of the Lady Isabella de' Medici, with whom both men were in love'.

In the eighteenth century, Riguccio Galluzzi reported on Isabella's death, stating that it was his opinion that her husband strangled her out of jealousy of Troilo Orsini, her relative, who was assassinated in France not long after her. The novelists and writers of secret memoirs of that time adopted this viewpoint which gained widespread currency.

Troilo never officially married or had any children, albeit at the time he was rumoured to be the biological father of Isabella's two children. In ambassadorial dispatches by Ferrarese ambassador Ercole Cortile there are also claims of a third child born to Isabella in May 1576 in the Medici villa of Caffagiolo, whose father could not have been her husband due to his absence. Whilst these claims remain unproven, if not for his own untimely death, Paolo Giordano had in fact intended to disinherit Virginio and Eleonora Orsini following Isabella's demise, claiming that the children were not his.

== Related art ==
Orsini is depicted in a painting by Anastasio Fontebuoni entitled 'Troilo Orsini is received by the Queen Mother Catherine de' Medici and Charles IX', commissioned by Maria de' Medici in 1620 for the Luxembourg palace in Paris and part of a series of paintings intended to celebrate the glory of Medici family and the royal house of France. This painting prominently features Troilo Orsini.
