= Marie-Félicie des Ursins =

French noblewoman (1600–1666)

Marie Félicie des Ursins
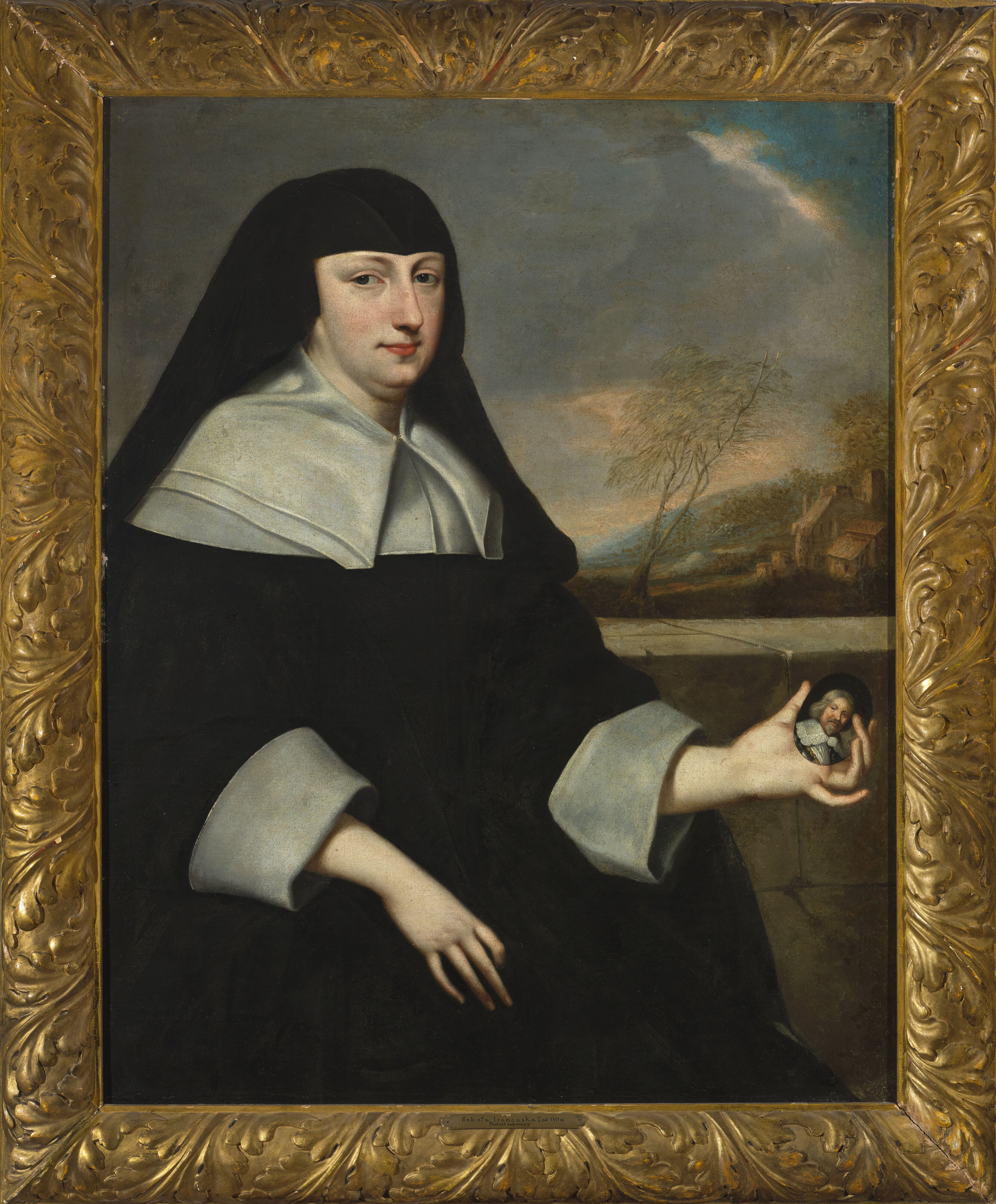
- Born: Maria Felice Orsini; 11 November 1600; Palazzo Pitti, Florence
- Died: 5 June 1666 (aged 65); Convent of the Visitation, Moulins, Allier
- Noble family: Orsini
- Spouse: Henri de Montmorency, 4th Duke of Montmorency
- Father: Virginio Orsini, Duke of Bracciano
- Mother: Flavia Peretti

Marie Félicie des Ursins (Italian: Maria Felice Orsini; 11 November 1600 – 5 June 1666) was the wife of Henri de Montmorency, 4th Duke of Montmorency, governor of Languedoc.

She was born into the House of Orsini in the Pitti Palace, Florence. She was daughter of Virginio Orsini, Duke of Bracciano and his wife Flavia Peretti, a niece of Pope Sixtus V. Wise and pious, very focused on charity and good works, she lived at the Château of Chantilly, choosing to reside in a cottage ("Sylvie's House") in the park in order to escape the bustle of the main building. She retired permanently to the Convent of the Visitation at Moulins-sur-Allier after her husband was executed for treason on 30 October 1632. She died there, aged 65.

Her inspiring life and character, combining tenderness and strength, earned her the admiration of contemporaries and the praise of many poets. It was Théophile de Viau who gave her the nickname "Sylvie" in reference to her love of woodland animals. She gave the libertine poet her friendship and protection. La Silvanire by Jean Mairet is dedicated to her.

== Bibliography ==
- Mémoires sur la vie de Marie Félicie des Ursins de Montmorency. Mgr. Paul Fliche. Poitiers: H. Oudin frères, 1877. (2 vols)
- Le journal des Demoiselles, A. Chevalier, 15 October 1900.
