= Alessandro Orsini (cardinal) =

Catholic cardinal (1592–1626)

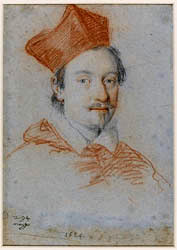

Alessandro Orsini (1592–1626) was an Italian Cardinal. He was a patron of Galileo, who dedicated his 1616 work on the tides to him, and requested that he pass it on to Pope Paul V. Orsini belonged to the ducal family of Bracciano.

Orsini was born in Bracciano, Italy. He was son of Virginio Orsini, Duke of Bracciano and his wife Flavia Peretti, a niece of Pope Sixtus V. He was brought up at the court of the Grand Duke Ferdinand I of Tuscany, and in 1615 was created a cardinal by Paul V. As papal legate to Ravenna under Pope Gregory XV, he distinguished himself in 1621 by his charity on the occasion of the outbreak of an epidemic. Upon his return to Rome, he devoted himself to religion and to the practice of an austere asceticism. He asked permission of the pope to resign the cardinalate and to enter the Jesuit Order, but this was refused.

He was ordained by Giovanni Garzia Mellini in 1602.

== Notes ==
Catholic Church titles
Preceded by Giovanni Battista Deti	Cardinal-Deacon of Santa Maria in Cosmedin; 1615–1626	Succeeded by Pietro Maria Borghese
