= La Sylvanire =

La Sylvanire ou la Morte-vive ("Sylvanire, or the Dead who Lived") is the title of several related works:

- La Sylvanire ou la Morte-vive, a pastoral fable dedicated to Marie de Médicis by Honoré d'Urfé published in 1627.
- La Silvanire ou la Morte vive by Jean Mairet (1604–1686), a pastoral tragicomedy dedicated to Marie-Félicie des Ursins, duchesse de Montmorency, published in 1630.
