= Virginio Orsini, Duke of Bracciano =

Virginio Orsini
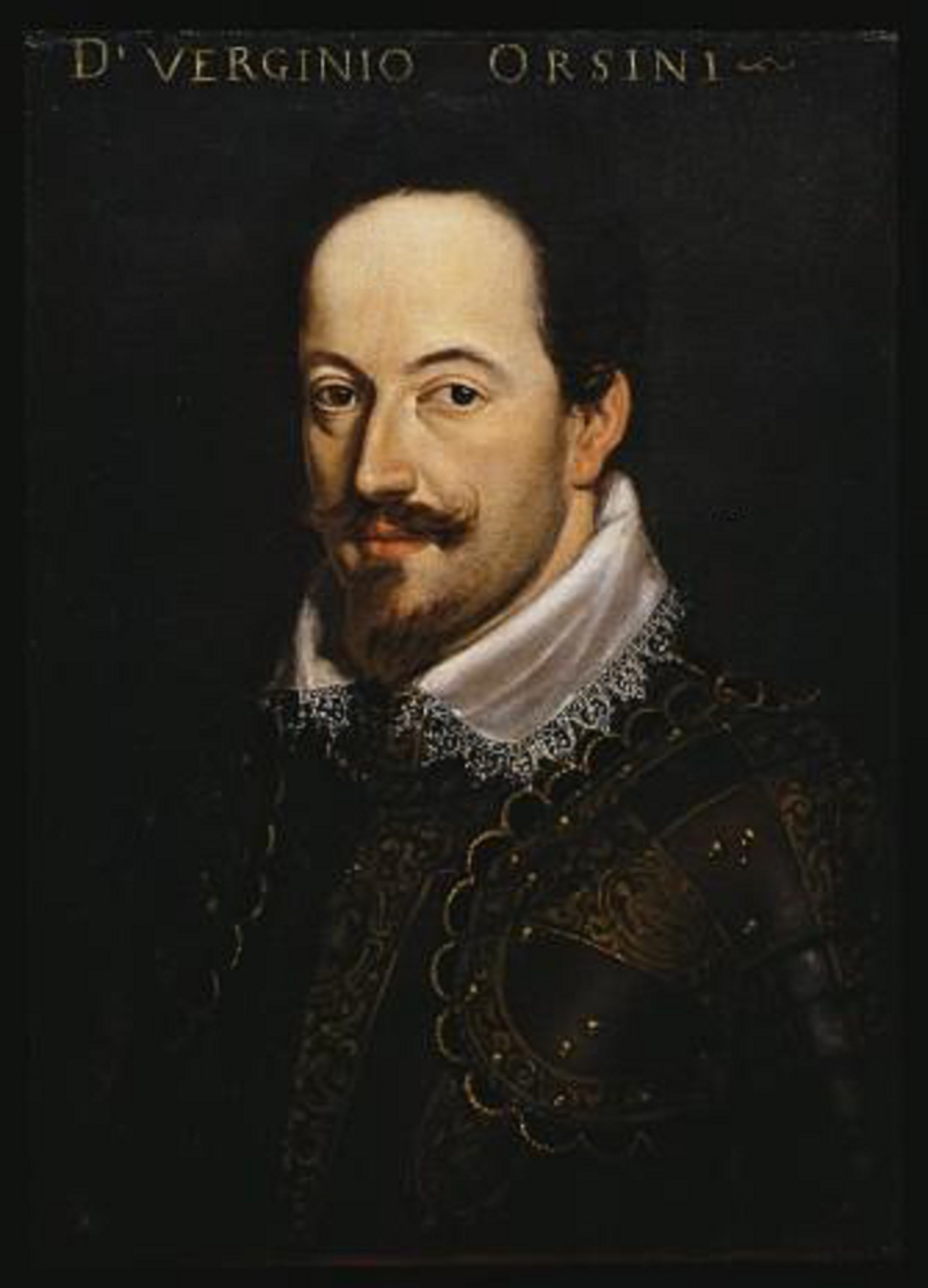
- Virginio Orsini by unknown Florentine painter

Duke of Bracciano
- Reign: 1585–1615
- Predecessor: Paolo Giordano I Orsini
- Successor: Paolo Giordano II Orsini
- Born: 11 September 1572
- Died: 9 September 1615 (aged 42); Rome
- Spouse: Flavia Peretti (m. 1589; died 1606)
- Issue Among others: Paolo Giordano II Orsini; Alessandro Orsini; Maria Felicia Orsini
- House: Orsini
- Father: Paolo Giordano I Orsini
- Mother: Isabella de' Medici

Virginio Orsini (11 September 1572 – 9 September 1615) was the second Duke of Bracciano, member of the Orsini family and knight of the order of the Golden Fleece.

He was the son of Paolo Giordano I Orsini and Isabella de' Medici, and inherited his father's titles and fiefs after his death in 1585. In 1589 he married Flavia Peretti, a niece of Pope Sixtus V, by whom he had 12 children. His son Paolo Giordano became a prince of the Holy Roman Empire through his marriage with Isabella Appiani, princess of Piombino.

Virginio Orsini was a supporter of the Earl of Essex and visited the English court for the Christmas revels in December 1600. He was entertained by Shakespeare's Twelfth Night and the play opens with the character of Duke Orsino saying the famous line "If music be the food of love, play on." Queen Elizabeth danced a galliard for him to show the "vigour of her old age".

He died in Rome in 1615.

== Issue ==
By his wife, Flavia Damasceni Peretti, he had twelve children, eight sons and four daughters:

- Paolo Giordano II (1591 – 24 May 1656). Duke after his father. He married Isabella Appiani, Ruler Princess of Piombino, and became a Prince of Holy Roman Empire.
- Alessandro (1592 – 22 August 1626). Cardinal.
- Isabella (1597–1623). She married Cesare II Gonzaga, Duke of Guastalla.
- Maria Felicia (12 November 1600 – 5 June 1666). She married Henri II, Duke of Montmorency.
- Camilla (29 July 1603 – ?). She married Marcantonio II Borghese, Prince of Sulmona. After he died, she became a nun.
- Ferdinando (? – 4 March 1660). Duke after his brother.
- Cosimo. Military.
- Virginio. Discalced Carmelite.
- Francesco. Jesuit.
- Carlo. Died young.
- Raimondo. Died young.
- Stillborn daughter (14 September 1606). Her mother died in childbirth.

Preceded by Paolo Giordano I Orsini	Duke of Bracciano; 1585–1615	Succeeded by Paolo Giordano II Orsini
