= Paolo Giordano II Orsini =

Italian nobleman, patron of arts, poet and painter

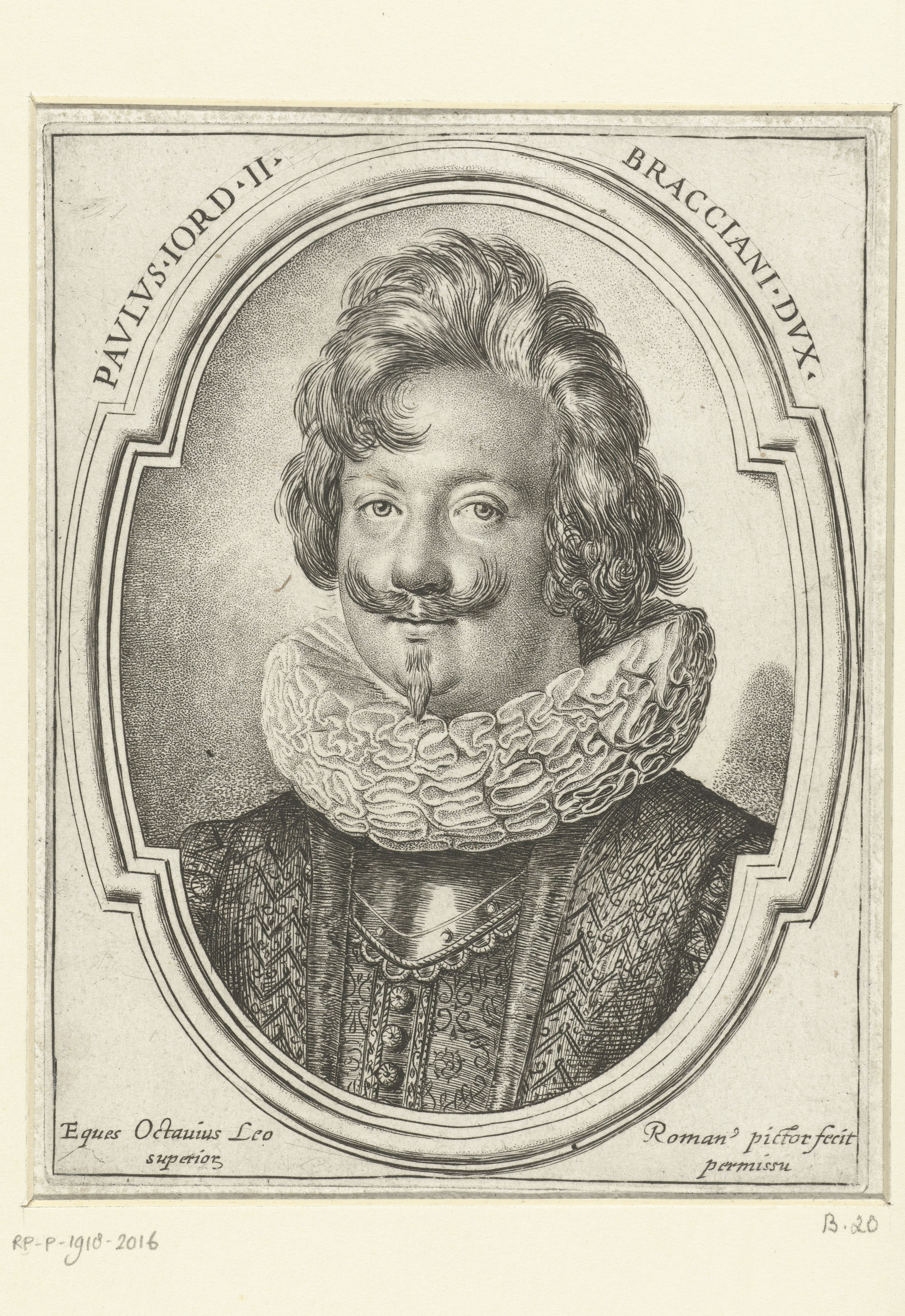
Engraving of Paolo Giordano II Orsini by Ottavio Leoni, c.1625

Paolo Giordano II Orsini (1591–24 May 1656) was an Italian nobleman, Patron of arts, poet, and amateur painter.

== Biography ==
He was the firstborn of Virginio Orsini, Duke of Bracciano and his wife Flavia Peretti, a niece of Pope Sixtus V. He grew up in Florence, where he lived at the Medici court. On the death of his father in 1615, he inherited the dukedom of Bracciano.

In Rome in 1622 he became the second husband of the widowed Isabella Appiani (c. 1630–1635), the last survivor of the Appiani family They did not have any issue, but he did have a natural son, Ippolito. He was also made a prince of the Holy Roman Empire by Ferdinand II on 18 July 1623.

He lived in his castle at Lake Bracciano, near Rome, where he amassed an art collection including paintings by Tintoretto, Salvator Rosa, and Daniele da Volterra, prints by Albrecht Dürer and Ottavio Leoni, sculptures by Gian Lorenzo Bernini and Johann Jakob Kornmann, among others. Paolo exchanged correspondence on the state of arts in Italy with Christina, Queen of Sweden. He died on 24 May 1656.

Preceded by Virginio Orsini	Duke of Bracciano; 1615–1656	Succeeded by Ferdinando Orsini
