= Isabella de' Medici =

Italian noblewoman (1542–1576)

Isabella Romola de' Medici
- Duchess of Bracciano
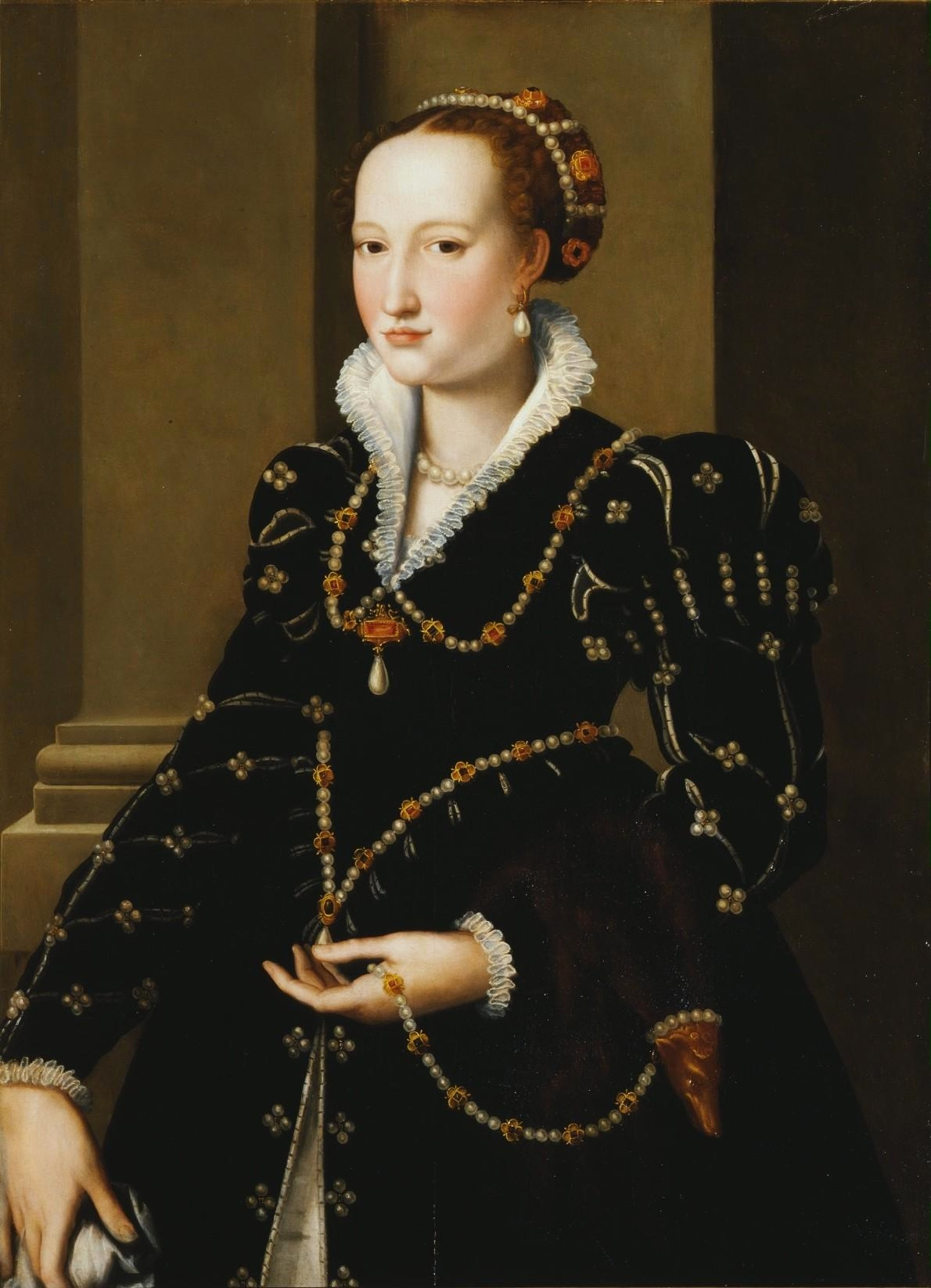
- Reign: 1560 – 16 July 1576
- Born: 31 August 1542; Florence, Tuscany
- Died: 16 July 1576 (aged 33); Villa di Cerreto Guidi, Tuscany
- Spouse: Paolo Giordano I Orsini
- Issue: Francesca Eleonora Orsini, Duchess of Segni and Santa Fiora; Virginio Orsini, Duke of Bracciano
- House: de' Medici
- Father: Cosimo I de' Medici
- Mother: Eleanor of Toledo

Princess Isabella Romola de' Medici (31 August 1542 – 16 July 1576), Duchess of Bracciano, was a Tuscan noblewoman, daughter of Cosimo I de' Medici, first Grand Duke of Tuscany, and Eleanor of Toledo. She was referred to as the Star of the House of Medici (La Stella di Casa Medici), in recognition of "her playfulness, vibrancy, often sarcastic sense of humour, sharpness and interest in a huge variety of topics - not to mention the great parties she held". Isabella de' Medici's influence on Renaissance Florence, through her patronage of the arts, political activities, and notable personal qualities, marks her as a significant figure within the Medici court of Grand Duke Cosimo I.

Educated in the humanist tradition with her siblings, including future Grand Dukes of Tuscany Francesco and Ferdinando de' Medici, Isabella de' Medici's destiny as a princess of the ruling Medici family, the first princes of Italy at the time, was to serve the family's political interests through marriage. Consequently, to secure Tuscany's southern borders through an alliance with the powerful Roman Orsini family, Isabella's father arranged her marriage to Paolo Giordano I Orsini when she was eleven years old. Unconventionally however, at her father's request, she remained in Florence after her marriage at age sixteen, a decision that granted her an unprecedented level of independence for a woman of her era.

Following her mother's death, Isabella's influence grew, and under the protection of her father, Cosimo I, she served as the primary female figure of the Medici family and the First Lady of Florence. Her prominent role was even recognised by other European courts, incl. the Vatican, during official occasions.

Following in the footsteps of her Medici ancestors, she occupied a central role within Florence's intellectual milieu, establishing a cultural circle, as well as championing the cause of female artists. Isabella's patronage extended to a wide range of artistic and intellectual figures, including writers, poets, painters, musicians, and scientists. Many dedicated their works to her, acknowledging her as a key figure in Florentine society and often portraying her in near-royal terms. This patronage fostered a vibrant intellectual and artistic environment in Florence and contributed to the revival of the city as a hub of Renaissance culture.

In an era when female patronage of the arts, beyond religious commissions, was still rather uncommon, she commissioned artworks solely for their aesthetic value. A key aspect of Isabella's contribution was her promotion of Florentine culture and its authors, including women artists, all the while spearheading initiatives alongside her father to establish vernacular Tuscan as Italy's official language. Contemporary accounts and artistic representations often idealised Isabella, comparing her to figures such as Saint Catherine of Alexandria and Minerva, emphasising her beauty, intellect, wisdom, and spirituality. Some even described her as a "new goddess," reflecting the high regard in which she was held.

Beyond the artistic sphere, Isabella also acted as a patron for women, supporting their professional endeavours and offering protection from abusive husbands, demonstrating her broader social influence.

In contrast to conventional expectations placed upon married women, Isabella de' Medici established a separate personal residence, the Villa Baroncelli (known today as Villa del Poggio Imperiale), which she held in her own name, distinct from her official marital residence in the ancestral Palazzo Medici on Via Larga. This choice not only asserted her independence but also stood as a tangible challenge to the prevailing societal norm of women being considered their husbands' property.

In 1576, two years after her father's death, Isabella died in circumstances that gave rise to widespread speculation of murder. Contemporary accounts and diplomatic dispatches suggest her husband may have been responsible, possibly with the complicity of her brother Grand Duke Francesco, in retaliation for her alleged affair with her husband's cousin, Troilo Orsini. Others suggested that Isabella's growing influence and popularity made her a potential rival to her brother Francesco, since as the mother of Cosimo I's only grandson at the time she could have served as a figurehead for opposition to his unpopular rule - a concern not unfounded in the wake of the Pucci conspiracy. However, scholar Elisabetta More argued that a literal reading of the correspondence between Isabella and her husband supports the conclusion that she died of natural causes.

Isabella had two surviving children: a daughter, Francesca Eleonora Orsini (known as Nora), and a son, Virginio Orsini. Nora would later marry her cousin Alessandro Sforza and become the Duchess of Segni and Santa Fiora, while Virginio would become the 2nd Duke of Bracciano and hailed as 'the best of the Orsini dukes'. He is believed to be the inspiration for Duke Orsino in Shakespeare's Twelfth Night.

Despite her contributions to Tuscan scholarship, arts, and politics, Isabella's legacy may have been deliberately suppressed after her untimely death. Although a prominent political figure and patron, her portraits are largely absent from family and museum collections, leading some scholars to suggest that she was subjected to damnatio memoriae, possibly orchestrated by her brother to restore family honour and posthumously diminish her influence.

After her death, Isabella remained a source of inspiration for musical and literary works. Today, each July, the village of Cerreto Guidi commemorates Isabella's life and cultural impact with a two-day festival called La notte d'Isabella (The night of Isabella).

== Biography ==
=== Early life ===
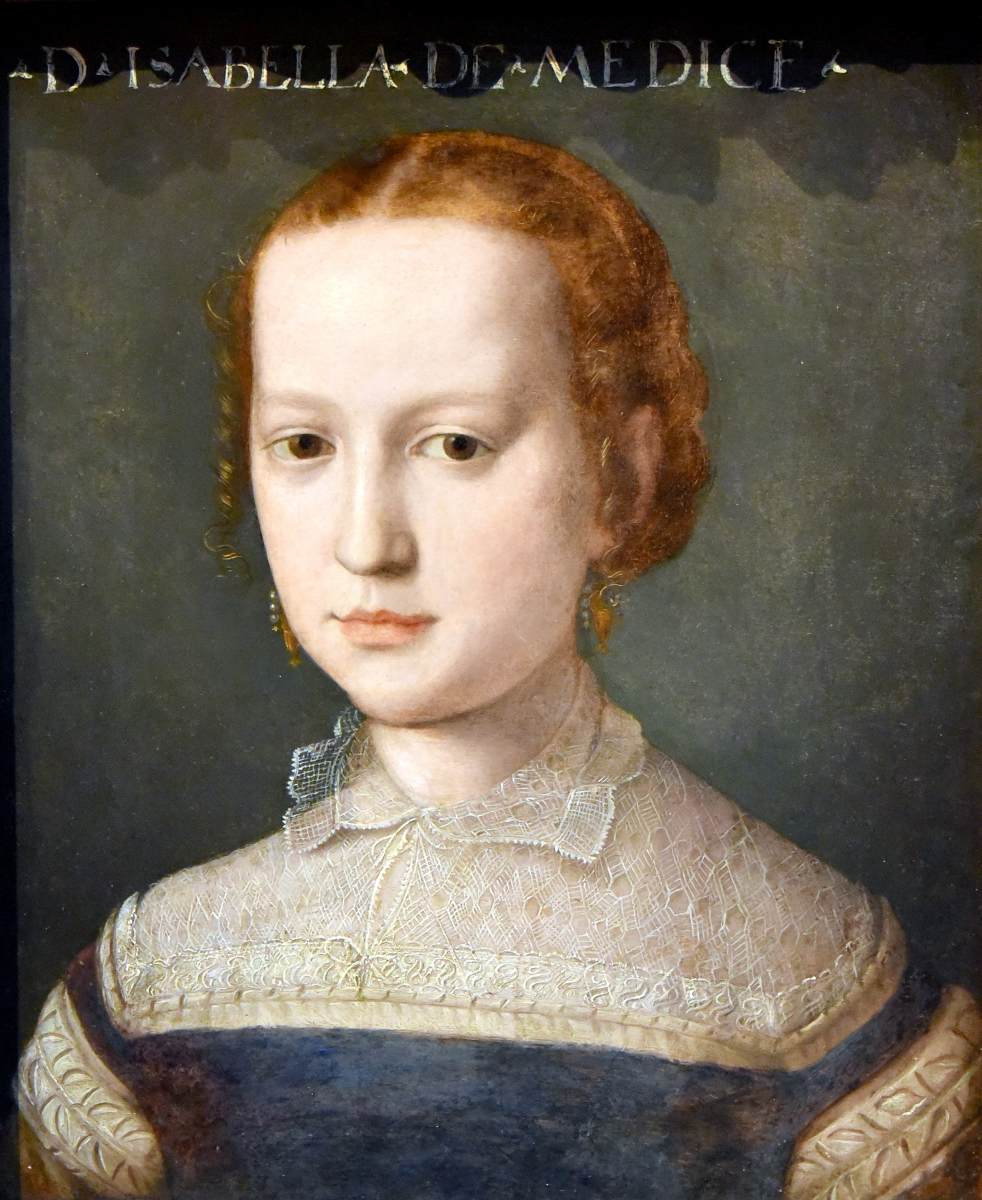
Bronzino's portrait of Isabella de' Medici as a young girl, National Museum of Stockholm

Isabella de' Medici was born in Florence on August 31, 1542, as the third child and second daughter of Cosimo I, Duke of Tuscany, and Leonor Álvarez de Toledo y Osorio Pimentel (commonly referred to as Eleanor of Toledo). Alongside her brothers and sisters, she lived first in the Palazzo Vecchio and later in the Palazzo Pitti, spending much of her time as a child at her father's ancestral country home, Villa di Castello. The Medici children were educated at home by tutors in a range of subjects such as the classics, languages and arts, overseen by Cosimo's mother Maria Salviati, until her death. From the age of five, as a young Medici princess, she studied Latin and Greek under the tutelage of Antonio Angeli da Barga and Piero Vettori. From an early age Isabella showed a great love for music, which in her adulthood she used as means for self-expression. Her music instructor, Mattia Rampollini, known as Squitti, served as her mentor from 1551 to 1554. Remarkably, at just nine years old, Mariotto Cecchi commended her as "learned", and her tutor, Pier Francesco Riccio, received a letter proudly stating, "She makes Latin verses that are lengthier than a bible".

Educated in the classics, she was also fluent in five languages: Spanish, French, Latin and Greek, in addition to her native Tuscan. From a young age; she was said to have a lively, high-spirited and vivacious character that was commented on by courtiers.

Isabella was also noted for her participation in traditionally male-dominated sports, such as hunting, where her equestrian skills were said to have surpassed that of many men in her entourage.

=== Role as the First Lady of Florence (1562 - 1574) ===
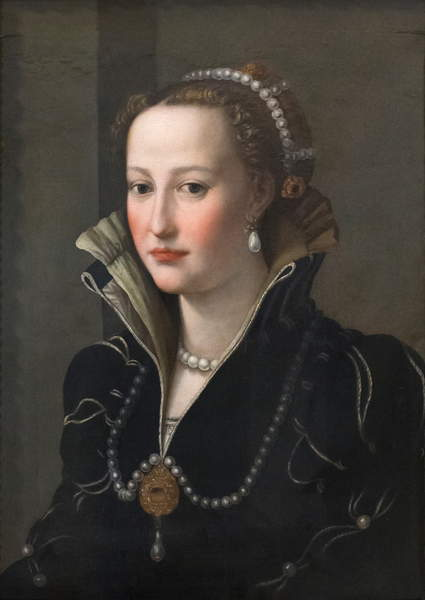
Alessandro Allori: Portrait of Isabella de Medici (c. 1565)

Following the deaths of her two sisters, Maria (1559) and Lucrezia (1561), and, most significantly, her mother Eleonora in 1562, Isabella became the sole adult woman in Cosimo I's immediate family. As she was yet childless, her brother Francesco entrusted her with the care of their younger brothers, Pietro and Ferdinando, and their ailing father, whose health had deteriorated following the loss of his wife and four children.

Throughout the life of Cosimo I de' Medici, Isabella held a prominent position among the women of the Medici family, a role that was recognised at formal events by European courts, including the Vatican. Her status was not diminished by her brother Francesco's marriage to Joanna of Austria, nor by Cosimo's later marriage to Camilla Martelli. As Camilla's commoner status limited her presence at official functions and Joanna showed little interest in stepping in to fill the void, Isabella continued to serve as the female representative of the Medici court until her father's death. She was consequently referred to by many as "the real Grand Duchess", a reputation reflected in the numerous works - literary, musical, and artistic - dedicated to her.

That said, her relationship with Joanna was notably cordial; the two maintained a warm correspondence even before Joanna's arrival in Tuscany as Francesco's wife. Their bond was further strengthened in December 1565, when Isabella hosted Joanna at Poggio a Caiano, in a display of hospitality reminiscent of her mother, Duchess Eleonora. According to contemporary accounts by Alessandro Mellini, Isabella also organised Joanna's ceremonial entry into Florence, during which she was received by Isabella alongside fifty noblewomen from her court.

Isabella's high-profile was reflected in the cultural and diplomatic spheres of Florence. In 1567, the madrigalist Stefano Rossetti dedicated a song to her, published alongside The Lament of Olympia in Venice, praising her as "worthy of a royal crown and empire."

Her ceremonial precedence was reaffirmed in 1570, when Cosimo I travelled to Rome to receive the title of Grand Duke of Tuscany from Pope Pius V. In accordance with papal protocol, Isabella was granted the honour of entering immediately after her father, mirroring the distinction once afforded to her mother a decade earlier.

Beyond ceremony, Isabella played an active role in the complex web of aristocratic diplomacy that connected European princely households. She maintained a broad correspondence with major figures of the time, including Catherine de' Medici and Elisabeth of Austria (both queens of France), King Henry III, Catherine of Austria (Queen of Poland), John of Austria, and Margherita of Savoy. These exchanges demonstrate her integration into the highest levels of European political and dynastic networks.

Her influence extended into controversial religious and political realms as well. From 1569, Isabella offered protection to Paolo Ghislieri, nephew of Pope Pius V, who had been stripped of his governorship and exiled due to his conduct. Her household also sheltered Fausto Sozzini, the anti-Trinitarian theologian who served the Dukes of Bracciano between 1569 and 1573. In the 18th century, the English curate Mark Noble remarked that "as the patroness of Socinus, as long as she lived, all the endeavours of the Inquisition to confiscate his effects were ineffectual." These acts suggest that Isabella used her position not only for diplomacy and ceremony but was also unafraid to support reformist or dissident intellectuals, even when doing so risked tension with papal authority.

=== Personal life ===
==== Marriage (1558 - 1576) ====
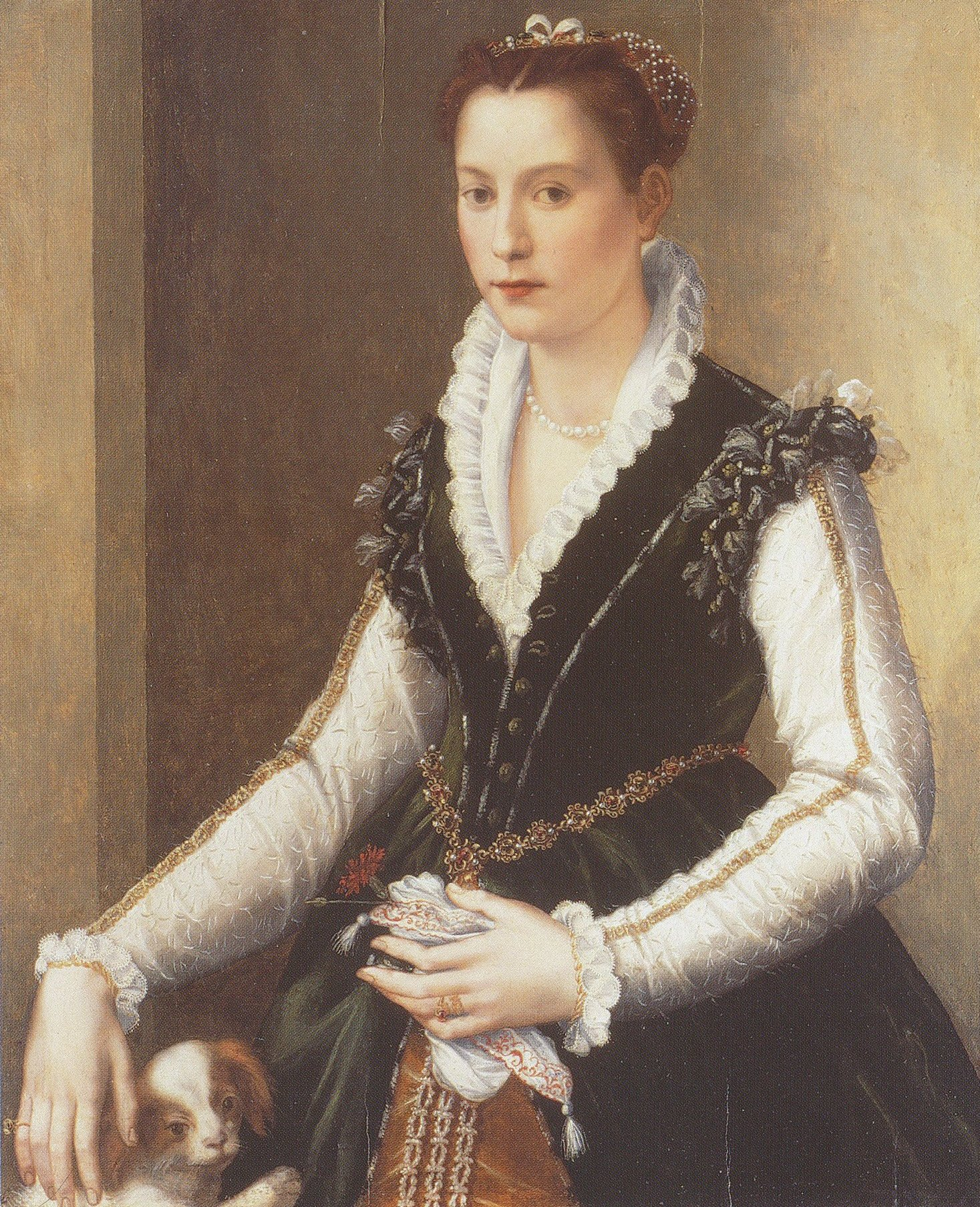
Portrait of 16-year-old Isabella de' Medici by Alessandro Allori, private collection, England

At the age of eleven, Isabella was betrothed to twelve-year old Paolo Giordano Orsini of Aragon, the lord of Bracciano and Anguillara. The marriage was arranged as a political alliance by her father, Cosimo I de' Medici, to solidify ties with one of the most powerful noble families in Rome. It aimed both to secure Tuscany's southern borders where the Orsini owned land, and to reinforce the longstanding connection between the Medici and Orsini families, dating back to Lorenzo de' Medici's marriage to Clarice Orsini and their son Piero's marriage to Alfonsina Orsini.

The marriage contract was signed in Rome on 11 July 1553, and the religious ceremony took place privately in Florence on 28 January 1556. Historical records indicate that the marriage was consummated on 3 September 1558, at the villa of Poggio a Caiano, when Isabella was sixteen; Paolo Giordano departed the following day. In honour of the couple, Francesco Corteccia, the court musician, composed a Latin motet, and the Flemish composer Philippus de Monte wrote a madrigal in which Isabella was described as wiser and more beautiful than Flora.

Although the match was typical of aristocratic strategy, the marriage itself was highly unconventional. Despite being formally wed in 1558, Isabella remained in Florence under her father's protection rather than relocating to her husband's Roman household. Cosimo distrusted Paolo Giordano's extravagant lifestyle and mounting debts and sought to retain control over Isabella's substantial dowry. While Paolo Giordano attempted to establish his residence at the castle of Bracciano — which had been elevated to a duchy by Pope Pius IV at Cosimo's behest as a wedding gift — the couple's official home remained the ancestral Palazzo Medici in Florence, which Paolo Giordano was responsible for maintaining alongside his titular fiefdom. In 1565, Isabella received the Villa Baroncelli (today Villa del Poggio Imperiale) as a gift from her father, giving her an independent household, court, and income — a degree of autonomy rarely seen even for women of her rank.

From the couple's correspondence, published by scholar Elisabetta Mori, it transpires that Paolo was frequently away on military or political assignments entrusted to him by Cosimo I, meant to supplement his income and help settle his debts. It was Paolo who regularly travelled to Florence to visit Isabella, not the other way around, highlighting the unconventional nature of their arrangement.

Their marriage, though politically expedient, became increasingly strained and the subject of public gossip. This was fuelled by rumours of Isabella's close relationship with Paolo's cousin, Troilo Orsini as well as Paolo's well-documented series of affairs, chiefly among them with Vittoria Accoramboni, whose husband he was accused of having murdered and whom he attempted to marry following Isabella's death. While no concrete evidence confirms an affair on Isabella's part, the suspicious circumstances of her sudden death in 1576 have fuelled speculation about the true nature of the marriage.

==== Relationship with Troilo Orsini (1564 - 1575) ====
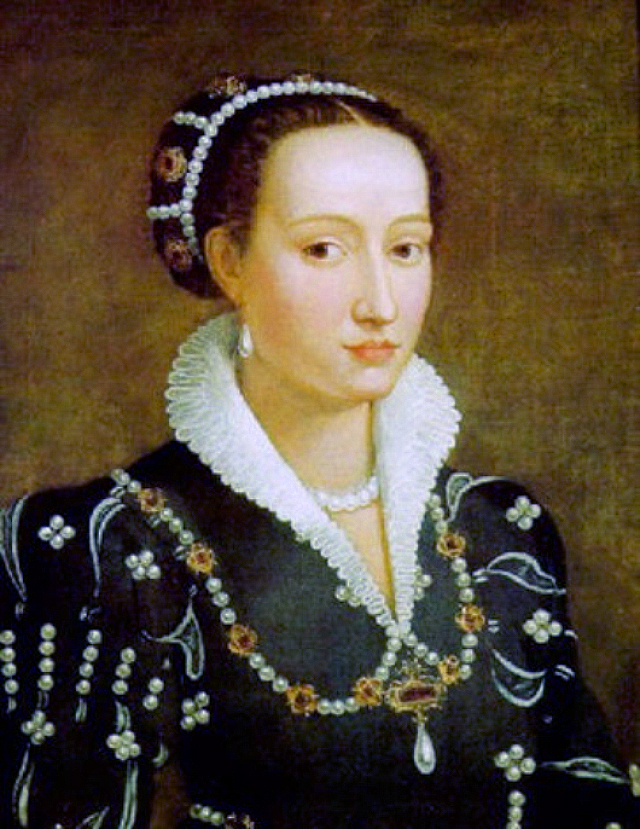
Isabella de' Medici Orsini - The pearls and roses of Isabella's attire symbolise the union of the Medici and Orsini families.

In the early 1560s Paolo Giordano Orsini reportedly entrusted his cousin - as well as Isabella's distant fifth cousin through their shared ancestor Clarice Orsini -, Troilo Orsini, with the supervision of his wife during his frequent absences.

Isabella's free-spirited personality sparked speculation with regard to the nature of her relationship with Troilo. These rumours, echoed in subsequent literary works and studies, suggested that Isabella and Troilo were involved romantically. Some historians believe that between 1564 and 1566, Isabella de' Medici and Troilo Orsini engaged in a romantic relationship, which is thought to have continued until Orsini's banishment from Florence in 1575. However, according to Caroline Murphy, the existence of several letters addressed to Troilo with requests that he intercede with Isabella imply a degree of public acknowledgment of their close connection.

Although no explicit love letters between Isabella de' Medici and Troilo Orsini survive, historians who support the theory of a romantic relationship between the two often cite a series of letters exchanged between Orsini and an unidentified woman of high rank. These correspondences describe an extramarital affair with a married woman from a prominent Florentine family who passionately declared her affection for him (“From the first day that I spoke to him I was so excited about him that I have never lived quietly, and your Lordship be sure that I love him and adore him as much as possible.”).

In her research, Murphy points to certain pieces of content in these letters linking the anonymous author to a high-ranking female member from within the Medici family - likely Isabella, as her sisters had already died by that time. Murphy argues that Isabella, aware of the potential consequences, would have taken extensive precautions to conceal her identity, such as omitting her signature and avoiding the use of her handwriting. However, the attribution remains unproven.

Murphy also recounts an incident from December 1574, documented by the Florentine chronicler Giuliano de' Ricci, in which Orsini fatally wounded Torello de' Nobili da Fermo, a close associate of Pietro de' Medici, “because of the Lady Isabella de' Medici, with whom both men were in love”.

In the eighteenth century, historian Riguccio Galluzzi reported that Isabella was strangled by her husband, Paolo Giordano Orsini, driven by jealousy over her alleged affair with Troilo, who was later assassinated in Paris, France. This interpretation gained wide popularity among later novelists and memoirists.

=== Death and controversies ===
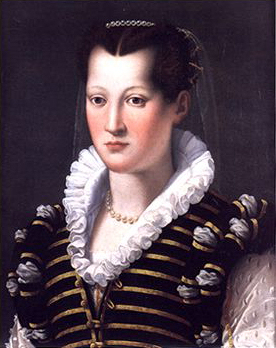
Isabella de' Medici, by Alessandro Allori, Uffizi, Florence.

While Isabella is recognised for her literary and artistic patronage, she is most widely remembered for the circumstances surrounding her death, which have been the subject of much historical and literary speculation.

On 16 July 1576, Isabella died unexpectedly at the Medici villa in Cerreto Guidi during a hunting trip. The official account, provided by her brother, Grand Duke Francesco, stated that she died "while she was washing her hair in the morning," having been found by her husband "on her knees, having immediately fallen dead". However, this account was met with widespread skepticism.

The Ferrarese ambassador, Ercole Cortile, reported that Isabella was "strangled at midday" by her husband, in the presence of several named servants, one of whom remarked that Isabella entered Paolo's chamber "as if she knew what was in store for her". Isabella's death followed a similar, sudden death of her cousin Leonora at a Medici villa just six days prior. Grand Duke Francesco later confessed to the honour killing of Leonora due to pressure from King Philip II, whose interest in her fate stemmed from the fact that Eleonora was the daughter of a Spanish grandee. Most historians believe Paolo Giordano murdered Isabella, possibly in response to her alleged affair with Troilo Orsini.

Other theories suggest Paolo Giordano may have acted on the orders of Francesco, potentially due to Isabella's growing influence and popularity among the nobles and the citizenry dissatisfied with Francesco's rule, which may have been perceived as a threat to his own power. The birth of Isabella's son, Virginio, who at the time was Cosimo I's only male grandson - as Francesco had no surviving sons -, may have further fuelled such concerns. Further suspicion is raised by an earlier incident in September 1572, when a fire broke out in the middle of the night at Palazzo Medici, where Isabella was staying with her 10-day-old baby son, following his birth. Although the fire caused substantial damage to the building, both Isabella and the infant - who had been sleeping in his mother's room - survived.

One scholar, Elisabetta Mori, has argued against the murder theory, proposing that Isabella died of natural causes and that the rumours of foul play were spread by enemies of the Medici.

Regardless of the true cause, the circumstances of Isabella's death became widely known throughout Europe, inspiring artistic and literary works for centuries afterward.

==== Damnatio memoriae ====
Isabella's prominent role within the Medici court was abruptly cut short before she reached the age of 34. Despite her status as Cosimo I's favoured daughter and confidante, her twelve-year political role as de facto First Lady of Florence, and her long-standing presence as a central figure in Florentine cultural life, her contributions to Tuscan scholarship and the arts have been comparatively overlooked and are notably absent from contemporary discussions and museum collections.

Scholars Karla Langedijk and Gabrielle Langdon have suggested that a damnatio memoriae (a condemnation of memory) may have been enacted against Isabella after her death, possibly by her brother Grand Duke Francesco, to restore family honour damaged by the rumours of adultery. As evidence, they point to the conspicuous absence of known portraits of Isabella within Medici collections, including her father's, suggesting a possible damnatio memoriae, a practice that at the time involved the destruction of portraits, letters, documents and other references to the condemned individual. This absence is particularly notable given her high status, her father's favour, her longer lifespan compared to her sisters, and her significant documented influence on Florentine culture.

== Children ==
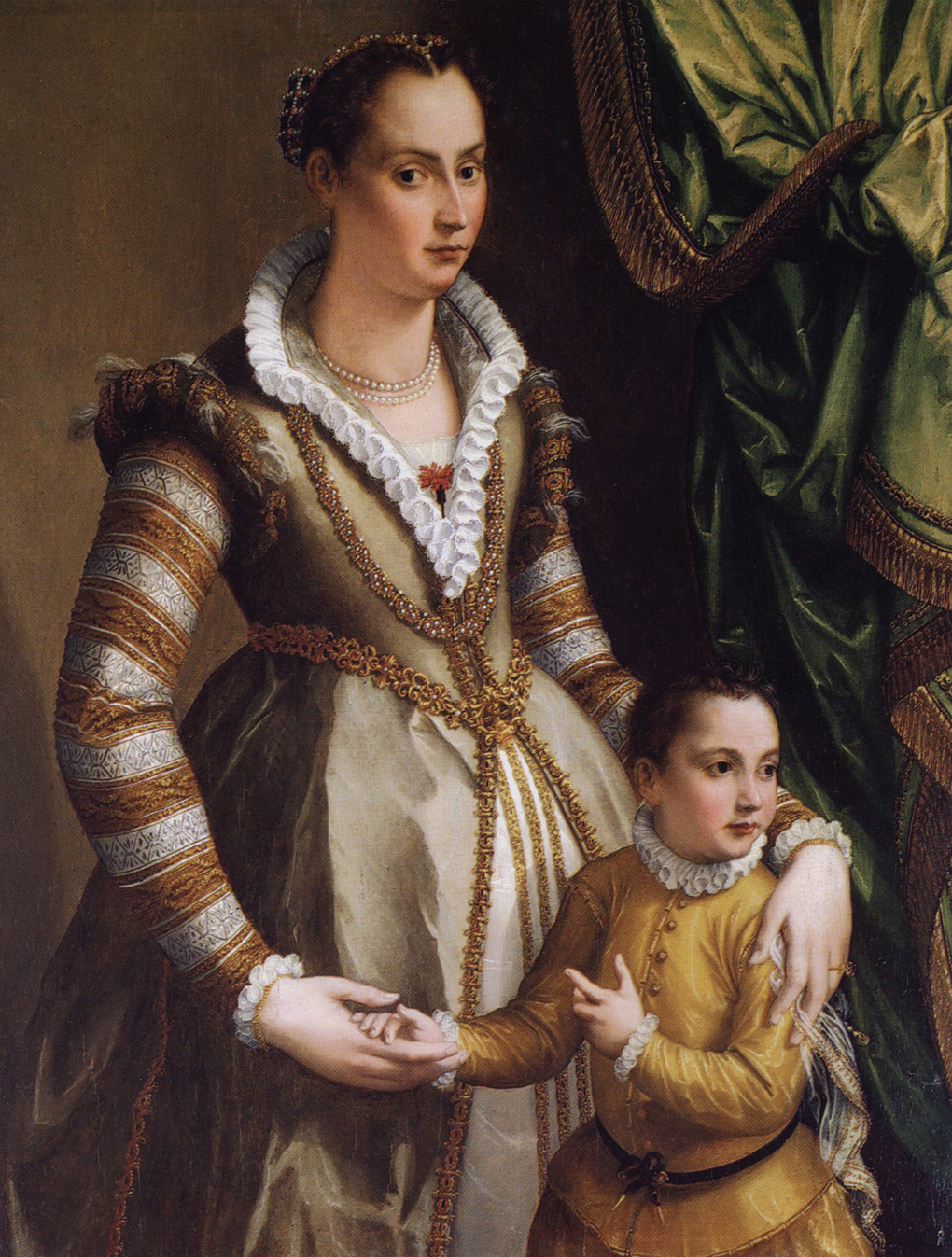
Portrait of Isabella de' Medici Orsini with her son Virginio by Alessandro Allori (1574)

After several miscarriages, Isabella de' Medici had two surviving children. Her daughter, Francesca Eleonora Orsini, was born in March 1571, followed by her son, Virginio Orsini, in September 1572. In accordance with her father's wishes, Isabella raised her children alongside Giovanni, Cosimo's son with Eleonora degli Albizzi. Francesca Eleonora, known as Nora, reportedly inherited her mother's musical talent and is credited with authoring the madrigal "Per pianto la mia carne si distilla." She later married her cousin Alessandro Sforza, becoming Duchess of Segni and Santa Fiora. Following her separation from her violent husband, she founded and retreated to a monastery in Tuscany, the Church of Saint Clare and Convent of the Poor Clares (Chiesa di Santa Chiara e convento delle Clarisse).

Virginio inherited the Duchy of Bracciano and was described by contemporaries as “the best of the Orsini dukes.” He is cited as the inspiration for Duke Orsino in Shakespeare's Twelfth Night, following his visit to London, where he was said to have impressed Queen Elizabeth I with his bearing and courtly demeanour.

Isabella was noted for her devotion to her children, reportedly dedicating more time to their upbringing than was customary for noblewomen of her rank. She is also believed to be the only documented noblewoman to have personally painted official portraits of her children.

== Legacy ==
"Wit, beauty and talent made her conspicuous among all the women of the day, Speaking Spanish, French and Latin fluently, a perfect musician, singing beautifully, a poetess and improvvisatrice by nature, Isabella was the soul of all around her, and the fairest star of the Medici."

=== Cultural patronage ===
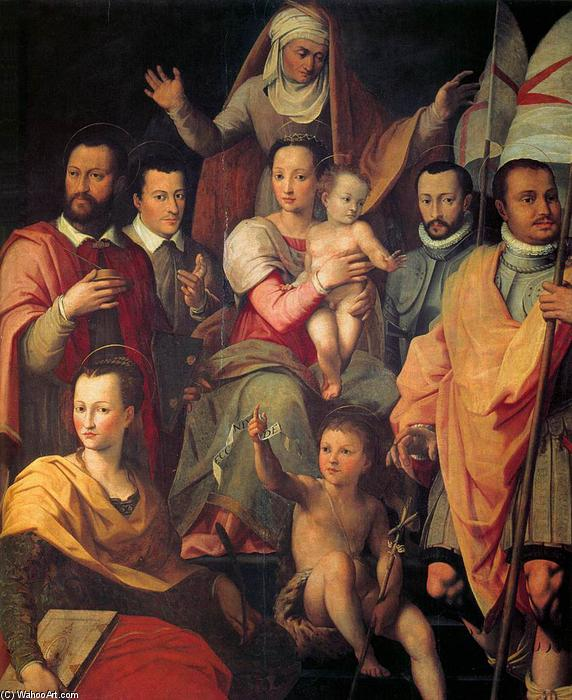
Giovanni Maria Butteri's altarpiece titled 'Virgin with Child and Members of the Medici Family as Saints', commissioned by Isabella

Isabella de' Medici was a quintessential Renaissance woman - a politician, muse, artist, and patron whose influence extended across the political and cultural spheres of late 16th-century Italy. Contemporaries described her as vivacious, beautiful, cultured, and wise, likening her to the goddess Minerva and the princess-scholar Saint Catherine of Alexandria. She was famously depicted as the latter in the Giovanni Maria Butteri altarpiece she commissioned, Virgin and Child and Members of the Medici Family as Saints, where she is featured in the bottom-left corner.

Throughout the 1560s and 1570s, Isabella presided over intellectual circles in Florence and Siena. At her residence, the Villa Baroncelli, she hosted literary and philosophical gatherings that attracted writers, musicians, and scholars, turning her court into a center of artistic patronage. Numerous dedications reflect her prominence: Filippo di Monte celebrated her as “the wisest of Florentia and the most beautiful” in a wedding madrigal; Beltramo Poggi, in La inventione della Croce di Giesù Christo (1561), praised her as “among the most illustrious and exceptional women in the world, distinguished not only by her status but also by her devotion and spirituality”; Fausto Sozzini included a sonnet in Rime portraying her as a “conduit for the light of God,” echoing Dante and Petrarch; Stefano Rossetti published a madrigal in her honour in The Lament of Olympia (Venice, 1567), praising her as “worthy of a royal crown and empire”; Girolamo Bargagli dedicated his Dialogue of the Games (Siena, 1572) to her; Mario Mattesillani offered a dedication in The Happiness of the Most Serene Cosimo de' Medici (Florence, 1572); and the Giunti press dedicated Luca Pulci's Ciriffo Calvaneo to her in order to highlight Florentine literary traditions. These dedications not only demonstrate Isabella's prestige but also provide insight into the political, religious, and cultural climate of sixteenth-century Florence.

Isabella de' Medici was not only the dedicatee of numerous works but also an active and discerning patron who commissioned art for her personal, secular enjoyment - an uncommon practice even for women of her rank during the Renaissance. Her literary commissions included poetry from Laura Battiferra, who honored Isabella with multiple dedications, and theatrical works like La Gostanza, written by the cleric and satirist Silvano Razzi for the carnival festivities of 1565. These examples reflect Isabella's cultivated interest in the arts beyond religious or dynastic obligations. Her patronage extended into the visual arts as well, notably through commissions from sculptors Vincenzo de' Rossi (Bacchus with satyr, and the Dying Adonis, still in the Medici collections and displayed in the Boboli Gardens) and Vincenzo Danti, whose works were intended primarily for aesthetic pleasure rather than devotional purposes - a notable deviation from the norms of female patronage in her time.

Concerning her own representation, several portraits of her survive, painted by court painters such as Bronzino and Alessandro Allori. However, unlike other members of the Medici family, she does not have a formal Bronzino state portrait of the type displayed in the Uffizi Galleries, an absence scholars have suggested may reflect a damnatio memoriae, despite her prominence as Cosimo I's favoured daughter.

Prior to the establishment of Accademia della Crusca, Isabella's cultural patronage also extended to the "questione della lingua", the debate about the standardisation of the Italian language. Giovanni Battista Strozzi recorded her 1573 arbitration advocating for the use of "mai" (never), citing Boccaccio's Decameron as her source. The Accademia degli Alterati also convened at Isabella's court, nominally under the patronage of her cousin Leonora, who lacked a formal court of her own.

=== Musical talent and patronage ===
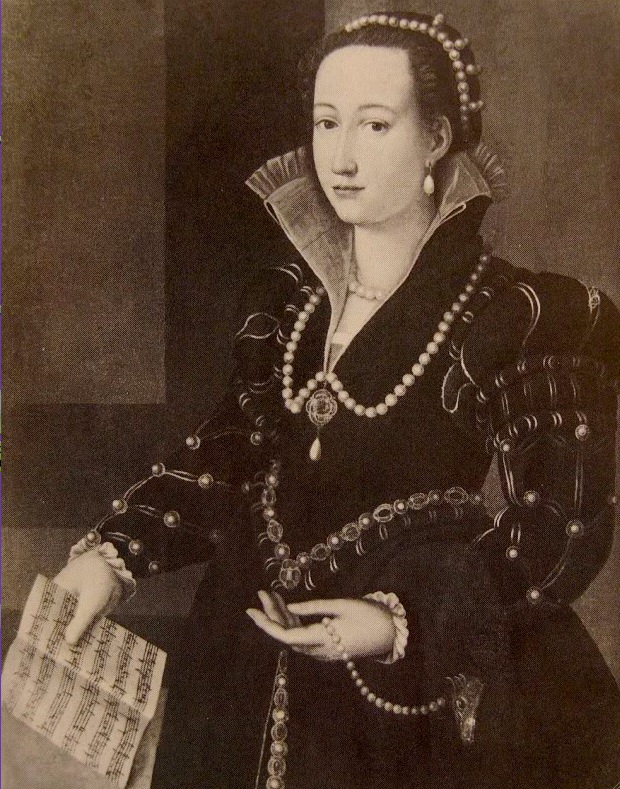
Portrait of Isabella de' Medici with sheet music (1560s, school of Alessandro Allori), commissioned by Isabella herself. Whilst aristocratic women cultivated music as a social grace, portraits celebrating female musical talent are rare, due to its historical association with seductive sirens, imbuing it with erotic connotations. This portrait was likely created for personal consumption.

Music was another important dimension of Isabella's cultural activity: she cultivated music throughout her life, both as a performer and as a composer. Her only surviving composition is a lute piece titled "Lieta vivo e contenta," transcribed in Cosimo Bottegari's song and lute book, now held in the Estense University Library in Modena. She also acted as a patron of music, supporting the career of the madrigalist Maddalena Casulana, who dedicated her Il libro primo de 'madrigali a quattro voci (Venice, 1568) to Isabella.

=== Later reception and scholarship ===
Isabella de' Medici's contributions to politics, the arts, and intellectual life, as well as her unconventional personal history, have continued to attract scholarly, musical, and literary attention after her death. Fabrizio Winspeare's Isabella Orsini e la corte medicea del suo tempo (1961) was among the first dedicated studies, followed by Donna Cardamone's analysis of her contributions to music in Gender, Sexuality, and Early Music (2002). Gabrielle Langdon examined her artistic and scholarly influence in Medici Women: Portraits of Power, Love and Betrayal (2006), while Caroline Murphy provided the most extensive modern biography in Isabella de' Medici: The Glorious Life and Tragic End of a Renaissance Princess (2008). More recently, Elisabetta Mori documented Isabella's surviving correspondence with her husband, family members, rulers, and foreign dignitaries in a 2019 publication.

Isabella also remained a subject of creative interpretation. She is the protagonist of Francesco Domenico Guerrazzi's novel Isabella Orsini, Duchessa di Bracciano, which centers on her inner life and moral struggles. Set against the constraints of her social position, the narrative explores themes of love, guilt, and internal conflict, delving into the psychological tensions between her desires and the expectations imposed upon her. In drama, John Webster's Jacobean tragedy The White Devil (1612), based on the life of Vittoria Accoramboni, incorporates aspects of Isabella's story, exploring themes of power, betrayal, and revenge with characters inspired by Isabella and her husband, Paolo Giordano Orsini. In opera, Federico Ricci composed Isabella de' Medici: opera seria, with a libretto by Antonio Gazzoletti, which premiered in Trieste in 1845; Renato Brogi composed Isabella Orsini, Duchessa di Bracciano, first performed in 1921. In contemporary fiction, Maggie O'Farrell's The Marriage Portrait (2022), while centred on Isabella's sister Lucrezia, draws heavily on Isabella's biography, particularly her tragic death, and Carla Maria Russo's La figlia più amata (2023) fictionalises her life based on Caroline Murphy's research.

Today, each July, the village of Cerreto Guidi commemorates her life and cultural contributions with the festival La notte d'Isabella (The night of Isabella).

== Ancestry ==
Ancestors of Isabella de' Medici

8. Giovanni il Popolano
4. Giovanni delle Bande Nere
9. Caterina Sforza
2. Cosimo I de' Medici, Grand Duke of Tuscany
10. Jacopo Salviati
5. Maria Salviati
11. Lucrezia de' Medici
1. Isabella de' Medici
12. Fadrique Álvarez de Toledo y Enríquez, 2nd Duke of Alba
6. Pedro de Toledo y Zúñiga
13. Isabel de Zúñiga y Pimentel
3. Eleanor of Toledo
14. Luis Pimentel y Pacheco, 1st Marquis of Villafranca del Bierzo
7. María Osorio y Pimentel, 2nd Marquise of Villafranca del Bierzo
15. Juana Osorio y Bazán, 1st Marquise of Villafranca del Bierzo
