= Henri de Montmorency, 4th Duke of Montmorency =

French military officer

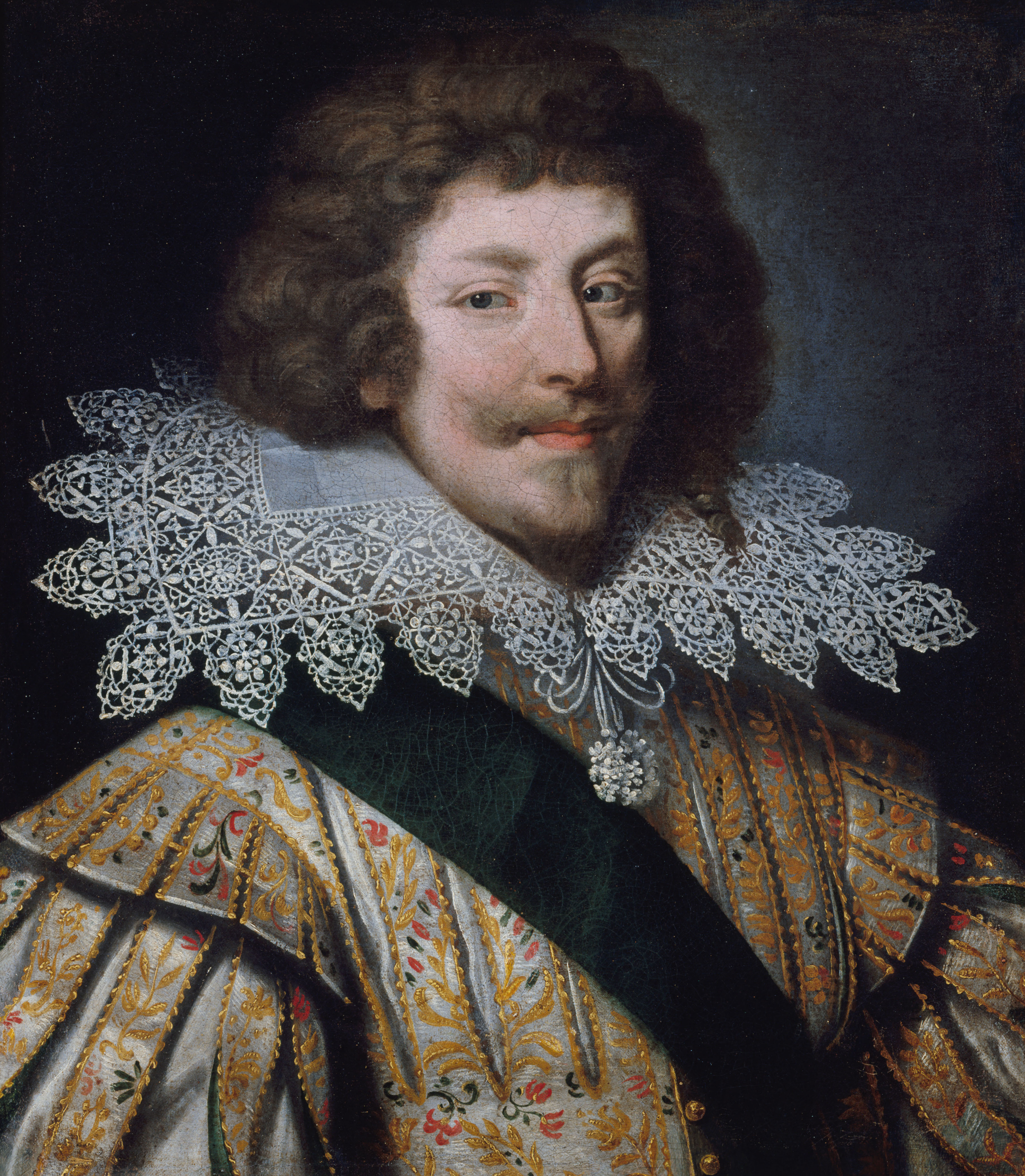
c. 1630 portrait of Montmorency by Daniel Dumonstier

Henri de Montmorency, 4th Duke of Montmorency (1595 – 30 October 1632) was a French military officer. Made Grand Amiral in 1612, governor of Languedoc in 1614, and by 1620 was viceroy of New France. Despite defeating a Protestant fleet and seizing islands of Ré and Oléron, Cardinal Richelieu kept him from taking advantage of these victories. Henri defeated the Duke of Rohan in Languedoc during 1628-1629. He gained notoriety as a military commander in Piedmont during the War of the Mantuan Succession in 1630. Joining the forces of Gaston, Duke of Orleans (king Louis XIII's brother), Henri raised an army and was severely wounded at Battle of Castelnaudary. Captured, he was executed on 30 October 1632, by a guillotine-like device.

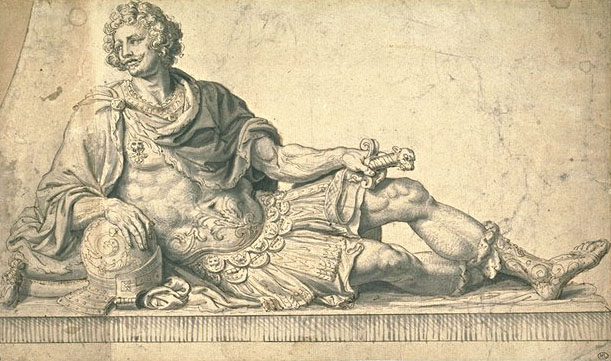
The funerary monument, by Michel Anguier

== Life and career ==
Born at Chantilly, Oise, Henri was the son of Henri de Montmorency, 3rd Duke of Montmorency, and his second wife, Louise de Budos. He was the godson of King Henri IV and was constantly receiving marks of the royal affection. Henri's name and his personality rendered him at an early age the darling of the court and the people. By 1612, he was raised to the office of Grand Admiral. Henri succeeded to his father's title of Duke of Montmorency in 1614 and was also governor of Languedoc. With influence from Marie de Medici, he married Maria Felicia Orsini, an Italian noblewoman. In 1620, he was made viceroy of New France, a post he held until 1625.

Henri wrested several important places from the Protestants and was present at the sieges of Montauban and Montpellier. On the renewal of the civil war in 1625, the fleet sent from Holland to aid the French king was placed under his command. In 1625, Henri defeated the French Protestant fleet under Soubise and seized the islands of Ré and Oléron, but the jealousy of Cardinal Richelieu deprived him of the means of following up these advantages.

In 1628–1629, Henri took command of a royal army to fight the forces of Henri, Duc de Rohan, in Languedoc, and he bested that famous leader of the Huguenots.

In 1630, Henri won renown as a military leader in the war against the Spaniards in Piedmont (Italy). He defeated the Piedmontese at the Battle of Avigliana, where he charged across a ditch at the head of the gendarmes of the king, captured Carlo Doria, the enemy general, with his own hand, and fought like a common soldier until the enemy was completely driven from the field. This victory was followed by the raising of the siege of Casal and the taking of Saluzzo. For these achievements, he was appointed a Marshal of France later in the same year.

At the height of his fame and influence, he was solicited to join the opponents of Cardinal Richelieu, Louis XIII's chief minister. Disliking Richelieu's attempts to rein in the influence of his class, in 1632, using his position as governor of Languedoc, he raised levies of troops and money, joined the party of Gaston, Duke of Orleans (the king's brother) and took command of an army of six or seven thousand.

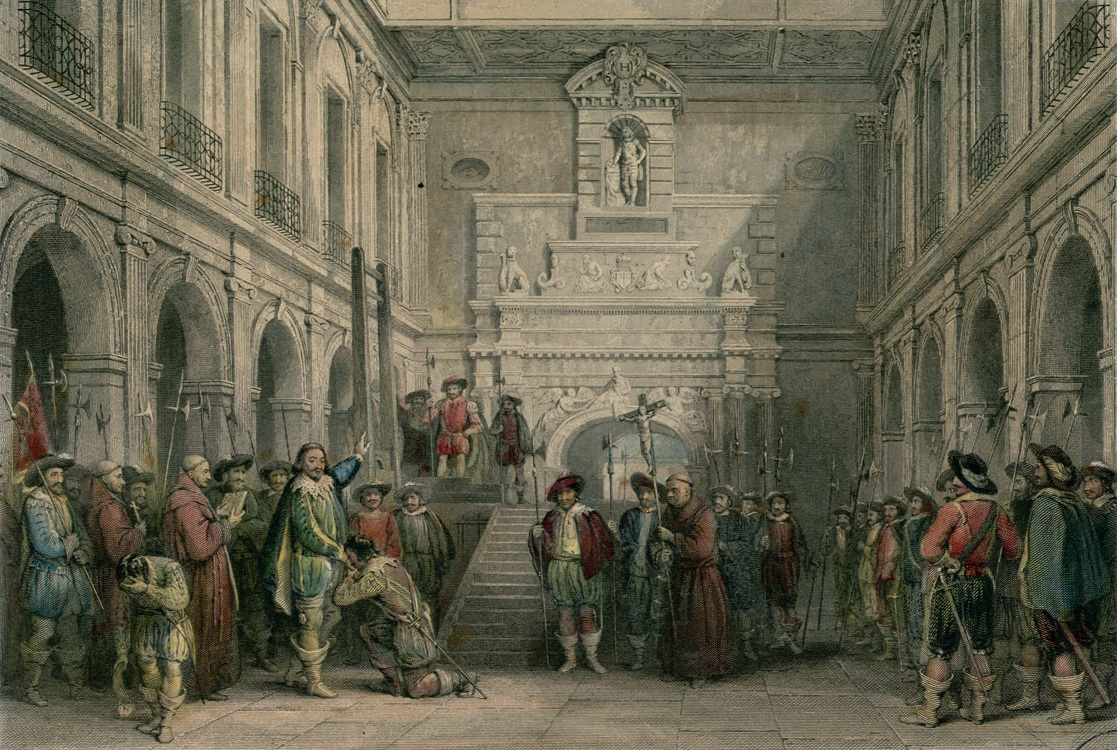
The execution of Henri

Negotiation was tried in vain; Henri was confronted and defeated by Marshal Schomberg at the Battle of Castelnaudary (1 September 1632). Trying to emulate his victory at Avigliana, Henri led a charge into the royal camp at the head of a few horsemen. He cut his way through six ranks of infantry amidst a continuing shower of shot and fought against overwhelming numbers, until his horse dropped dead. Severely wounded, he was captured.

Abandoned by Gaston, he was doomed to death by the remorseless Richelieu, as an example to the rest of the plotting nobility. In vain his life was begged for by all ranks throughout France. The only palliation of punishment that could be obtained from Louis XIII was that the execution should be in private. Henri was therefore beheaded in Toulouse's town hall 30 October 1632, by a guillotine-like device (according to the memoirs of Jacques, vicomte de Puysegur). His title passed to his sister, Charlotte Marguerite, Princess of Condé.

== Sources ==
- Barbier, Jean Paul (2002). Ma bibliothèque Poétique (in French). Librairie Droz.
- Fischer, David Hackett (2009). Champlain's Dream. Knopf.
- James, Alan (2004). The Navy and Government in Early Modern France, 1572-1661. The Boydell Press.
- Knecht, R.J. (2014). Richelieu. Routledge. ISBN 9781317874546.
- Koskenniemi, Martti (2021). To the Uttermost Parts of the Earth: Legal Imagination and International Power 1300-1870. Cambridge University Press.
- Sandberg, Brian (2010). Warrior Pursuits: Noble Culture and Civil Conflict in Early Modern France. Johns Hopkins University Press.
- Sonnino, Paul (2020). The Political Testament of Cardinal Richelieu. Rowman & Littlefield Publishing Group. ISBN 978-1538135969.
- Tucker, Spencer (2010). A global chronology of conflict: from the ancient world to the modern Middle East. Vol. 2. ABC-CLIO. ISBN 978-1-85109-667-1.

French nobility
Preceded by Henri	Duke of Montmorency	Next: Charlotte Marguerite
