= Jacopo Riguccio Galluzzi =

Italian writer and historian (1739–1801)

Jacopo Riguccio Galluzzi (25 April 1739 – 24 September 1801) was an Italian writer and historian, mainly of the Medici dynasty and era in Florence.

== Biography ==
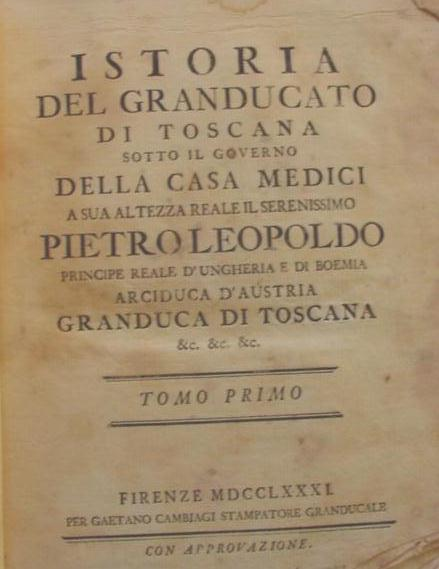
Title page of Jacopo Riguccio Galluzzi's Istoria del granducato di Toscana sotto il governo della Casa Medici, Florence, Cambiagi, 1781

He was born in Volterra to a prominent family. During 1757–1762, he studied Civil and Canon law at the University of Pisa. He then moved to Florence to work under the jurist Pompeo Neri. He obtained a salaried position in the State department of the Grand Duchy, and in 1768 was appointed professor of Moral Philosophy at the University of Florence. In 1769, Riguccio, along with Carlo Bonsi and Ferdinando Fossi, was appointed by Grand-Duke Leopold with the gargantuan task of reorganizing the archives of the Secretary of State of Tuscany. He continued into the 1790s with various government posts. He wrote a history of the House of Medici, including of the last of grand-duke of the family, Gian Gastone. The work was commissioned by Grand-Duke Leopold.

During the occupation of Tuscany by the French Revolutionary armies, in 1798 he also joined the French-backed puppet government. He was subsequently forced to flee to Paris, only to return to Florence in 1801.
