= Spanish–Ottoman Wars =

1492–1792 series of conflicts

Spanish–Ottoman wars
- Part of Ottoman–Habsburg wars, Ottoman–Venetian wars, Italian Wars, European wars of religion, Ottoman wars in Africa, Ottoman–Iranian Wars
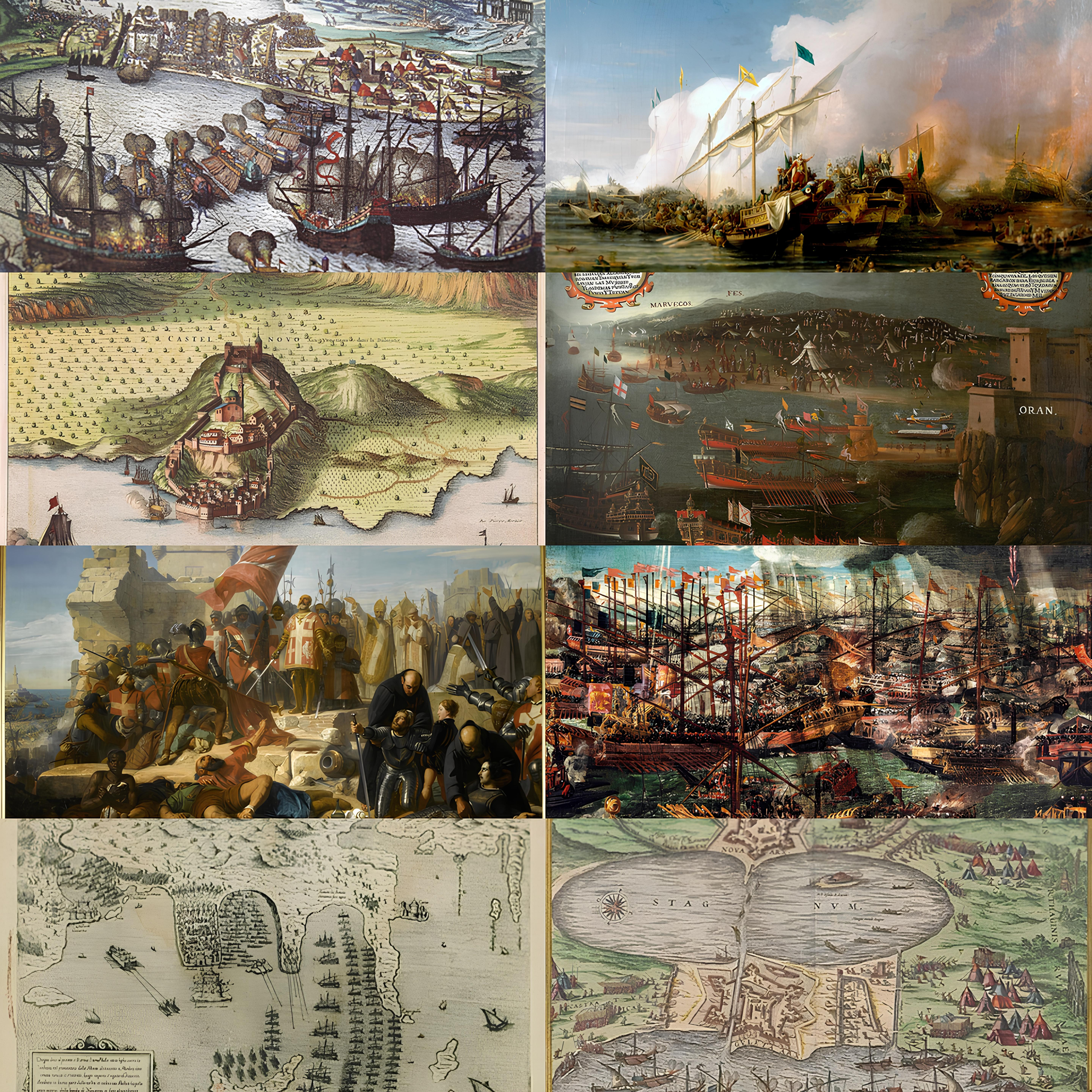
- Battle of Tunis (1535), Battle of Preveza (1538), Siege of Castelnuovo (1539), Sieges of Oran and Mers El Kébir (1563), Great Siege of Malta (1565), Battle of Lepanto (1571), Siege of Navarino (1572), Conquest of Tunis (1574)
Date	1492–1581
Location	Mainly Mediterranean (Southern Europe and North Africa). Also Central Europe, Balkans, East Africa, Indian Ocean (Red Sea, Persian Gulf), Indian subcontinent, Southeast Asia
Result	Spanish-Ottoman Armistice (1581): Decline of Ottoman offensive ambitions in the western Mediterranean; The Ottomans shifted their military attention east, toward Safavid Persia

Belligerents
Spanish Empire: Spain; Naples; Sicily; Duchy of Milan; Sardinia; Spanish Tripoli; Spanish Oran; Spanish Netherlands; New Spain; Viceroyalty of Peru; Philippines; Portugal: Portuguese India; Mozambique; Papal States; Order of Malta; Republic of Venice; Republic of Ragusa; Holy Roman Empire: Savoy; Republic of Genoa; Florentine Republic; Tuscany; Mantua; Montferrat; Ferrara; Urbino; Bavaria; Austria; Bohemian Crown; Duchy of Carniola; Flanders; Hungary; Croatia; Holy Leagues; Supported by: Kingdom of Kartli Ethiopian Empire Poland–Lithuania Tsardom of Russia Montenegro Serbian dissidents Greek dissidents Albanian dissidents	Ottoman Empire: Regency of Algiers; Ait Abbas; Kuku; Eyalet of Tunis; Ottoman Tripolitania; Egypt; Yemen Eyalet; Habesh Eyalet; Funj Sultanate; Basra Eyalet; Sultanate of Aceh; Eyalet of Bosnia; Crimean Khanate; Barbary corsairs Supported by: Morocco Sulu Sultanate Maguindanao Bruneian Empire Sultanate of Ternate Adal Sultanate Kathiri Sultanate Ajuran Sultanate Gujarat Sultanate; Deccan Sultanates; Ahmadnagar Sultanate; Bijapur Sultanate; Golconda Sultanate Morisco/Mudejar Dissidents

Commanders and leaders
Ferdinand II of Aragon; Isabella I of Castile (Spanish Empire) (Holy Roman Empire) Charles V (Spanish Empire) Felipe II (Spanish Empire) Felipe III Notable figures: (Spanish Empire) Francisco Jiménez de Cisneros (Spanish Empire) Pedro Navarro (Spanish Empire) Francisco de Sarmiento (Spanish Empire) Juan de la Cerda (Spanish Empire) Álvaro de Sande (Spanish Empire) Luis de Ávalos (Spanish Empire) Luis de la Cueva y Toledo (Spanish Empire) Bernardo de Aldana Giovanni Battista Castaldo Gian Giacomo Medici (Spanish Empire) Pedro de Toledo (Spanish Empire) García Álvarez de Toledo (Spanish Empire) Juan de Austria (Spanish Empire) Álvaro de Bazán the Elder (Spanish Empire) Álvaro de Bazán the Younger (Spanish Empire) Luis de Requesens (Spanish Empire) Hernán Cortés (Spanish Empire) Fernando Álvarez de Toledo y Pimentel (Spanish Empire) Luis Fajardo Carlo d'Aragona Tagliavia Pedro Téllez-Girón (Spanish Empire) Álvaro de Bazán (Spanish Empire) Álvaro de Bazán III (Spanish Empire) Francisco de Ribera y Medina Ottavio d'Aragona Manuel I John III Sebastião I Infant Luis Francisco Barreto (Spanish Empire) John of God Estêvão da Gama (Portuguese Empire) Cristóvão da Gama (Portuguese Empire) Diogo de Noronha Antão de Noronha João de Castro Manuel de Sousa Coutinho (Holy Roman Empire) Ferdinand I (Holy Roman Empire) Maximilian II (Spanish Empire) Mary of Hungary (Papal States) Pope Paul III (Papal States) Pope Pius V (Papal States) Marco Grimani (Papal States) (Spanish Empire) Marcantonio Colonna (Sovereign Military Order of Malta) Jean Parisot de Valette (Sovereign Military Order of Malta) Jean de la Cassière (Sovereign Military Order of Malta) Mathurin Romegas (Sovereign Military Order of Malta) Alof de Wignacourt (Republic of Venice) Andrea Gritti (Republic of Venice) Alvise I Mocenigo (Republic of Venice) Vincenzo Cappello (Republic of Venice) Sebastiano Venier (Republic of Venice) Marco Antonio Bragadin (Republic of Venice) Agostino Barbarigo (Republic of Genoa) Andrea Doria (Republic of Genoa) Gianandrea Doria Cosimo I de' Medici (Spanish Empire) Chiappino Vitelli Ferrante Gonzaga Wilhelm von Roggendorf Shahnavaz Khan (Simon I of Kartli) (Ethiopian Empire) Dawit II (Ethiopian Empire) Gelawdewos	(Ottoman Empire) Bayezid II (Ottoman Empire) Selim I (Ottoman Empire) Suleiman the Magnificent (Ottoman Empire) Selim II (Ottoman Empire) Murad III (Ottoman Empire) Mehmed III Notable figures: (Ottoman Empire) Kemal Reis (Ottoman Empire) Piri Reis (Ottoman Empire) Dragut (Ottoman Empire) Piali Pasha (Ottoman Empire) Şehzade Mehmed (Ottoman Empire) Seydi Ali Reis (Ottoman Empire) Sinan Reis (Ottoman Empire) Ayas Mehmed Pasha (Ottoman Empire) Mahomet Sirocco (Ottoman Empire) Sokollu Mehmed Pasha (Ottoman Empire) Müezzinzade Ali Pasha (Ottoman Empire) Lala Mustafa Pasha (Ottoman Empire) Murat Reis (Ottoman Empire) Sefer Reis (Ottoman Empire) Mustafa Pasha (Ottoman Empire) Khoja Zufar (Ottoman Empire) Mir Ali Beg (Regency of Algiers) Aruj Barbarossa (Regency of Algiers) Hayreddin Barbarossa (Regency of Algiers) Hasan Pasha (Regency of Algiers) Occhiali Abu Abd Allah al-Burtuqali Muhammad ibn Muhammad Abu al-Abbas Ahmad ibn Muhammad Ali Abu Hassun Al-Hajarī Aben Humeya Ahmad ibn Ibrahim Rasul ibn Ali

The Spanish–Ottoman wars (Note: Spanish: Guerras hispano-otomanas Turkish: İspanyol-Osmanlı Savaşları) were fought between the Ottoman Empire and the Spanish Empire for Mediterranean and overseas influence, and especially for global religious dominance between the Catholic Church and the Ottoman Caliphate. The peak of the conflict was in the 16th century, during the reigns of Charles V of the Holy Roman Empire (HRE), Philip II of Spain, and Suleiman the Magnificent of the Ottoman Empire; the conflict occurred during the years 1515–1577, although it formally ended in 1782.

== Prelude ==
=== Clash of interests in the Mediterranean and Europe ===
Islamic rule in the Iberian Peninsula, which began in 711, experienced its last great period during the reign of Abd ar-Rahman III (929–961). After his death, the Andalusian Umayyad state began to decline, and with the collapse of this state in 1031, the Tawaif-i Mulûk period—in which various Muslim emirates (34 at one point) ruled together—was between 1031 and 1090. Muslims tried to resist the attacks of the Christian kingdoms in the peninsula (León, Castile, Aragon, Navarre, Galicia and Portugal) within the framework of the goal of the Reconquista during the Almoravid and Almohad periods (1090–1248); however, the Battle of Las Navas de Tolosa in 1212 was a turning point in Islamic history. After a decisive victory by the Christians, the Emirate of Granada continued to exist in areas confined to the south of the peninsula as a dependency of Castile between 1232 and 1492; but with the unification of Castile and Aragon in 1469, the emirate began to face a more aggressive Spanish policy. Having lost its lands one by one in the Granada War that began in 1482, the Emirate of Granada was erased from history when its capital, Granada, fell on 2 January 1492, after an eight-month siege. The relations between the Ottoman Empire and Spain also began indirectly with the Granada War. Emir Abu Abdullah, who was in a difficult situation because of a series of land losses during the war, sent an ambassador to the Ottoman Sultan Bayezid II asking for help. However, Bayezid II was occupied with his brother Cem on the one hand and fighting with the Mamluks on the other, so he could not send the requested help.

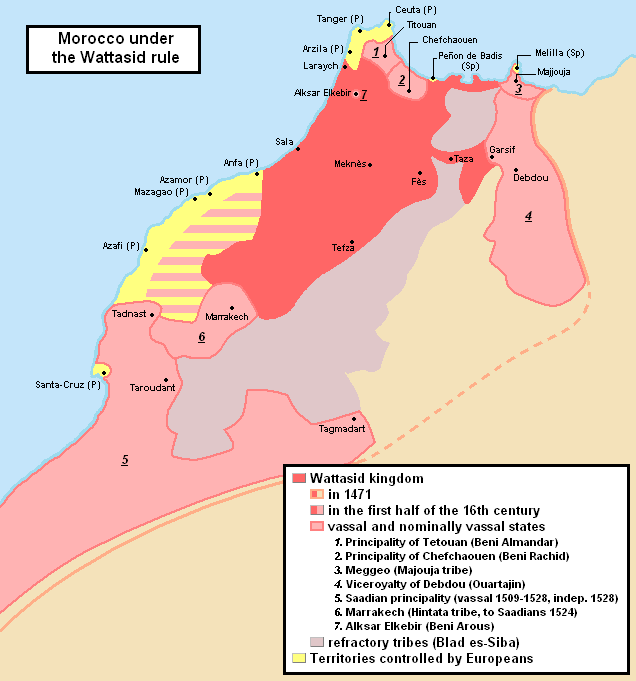
Iberian colonies over Wattasid Morocco

The Spanish Empire expanded its military operations to the North African coast and—with the help of its strengthened navy and the leadership of Cardinal Cisneros—settled at Santa Cruz de la Mar Pequeña in 1478. Then it occupied Melilla on the Moroccan coast and the island of Djerba on the Tunisian coast in 1497; Mers El Kebir in 1505; Peñón de Vélez de la Gomera in 1508; Oran in 1509; and Béjaïa and Tripoli in 1510. It also built a fortress on the island opposite the city of Algiers (recently conquered) and took the city indirectly under its control. However, the empire was defeated on Djerba in 1510. Simultaneously, a new phase of Moroccan–Portuguese conflicts started in which the Portuguese conquered the territories of Asilah and Tangier in 1471; conquered Castelo Real in 1506; won Azemmour in 1513; and won the Tednest and the Boulaouane in 1514. However, the empire failed at Graciosa in 1498; at Mamora and Marrakesh in 1515; and at Doukkala in 1516. Corsair raids remained a primary aspect of Ottoman–Spanish conflict. For example, as a modern study notes, the fall of Granada (1492) and Iberian incursions into North Africa "triggered a corsair war", with Ottoman-backed North African rulers licensing raids on Spanish shipping.

Plans to divide the Maghreb between Castile-Aragon and Portugal during the final stages of the Reconquista (including the Capitulation of Cintra)

This Iberian expansion over North Africa was formalized in 1509: the Crown of Castile and the Crown of Portugal signed the Capitulation of Cintra, in which both kingdoms partitioned the Maghreb into two spheres of influence, in which Morocco and Western Sahara were considered part of the Portuguese Empire's projection of power and territorial expansionism, while Algeria, Tunisia and Libya were part of the Spanish Empire's one. The main objective was to establish cooperation between the Iberian kingdoms for the conquest of North Africa. This was considered a continuation of the Reconquista to avoid further Berber-Islamic interventions in Iberia, as during the Marinid dynasty (legitimizing it by claiming that Mauretania Tingitana was part of Hispanidad/Iberism because of former links with Visigothic and Roman Hispania, along the existent in Al-Andalus era). Therefore it was necessary to avoid a Luso-Castilian war for control of the Berber states. As a result, it was agreed that the Portuguese would abandon the conquest of Vélez de la Gomera and the rest of the eastward territories (ensuring the Castilian sovereignty of Melilla and Cazaza), while the Castilians accepted Portuguese sovereignty over the North African territories between Vélez and Cape Bojador (on the Atlantic coast). Another important goal was the peaceful evangelization of Muslims through vassalage of their rulers.

During this period, all of North Africa (except Egypt) was ruled by local emirates that lacked military power and were too weak to resist the Spanish invasions. Two developments changed this disadvantageous situation in the early 1500s. First, after the prohibition of Islam in Spain in 1502, tens of thousands of Muslims from Andalusia migrated to North Africa, creating a fresh and dynamic population. Second, Turkish sailors from the western Anatolian coasts based themselves in the region and began resistance against the Spanish.

Within this framework, Oruç Reis and Kemal Reis—who were based on the island of Djerba in 1503—carried Muslims and Jews from Spain to North Africa, and they also began to clash with the Spanish. Oruç Reis and Hızır Reis (Hayreddin Barbarosa), who joined him, made an agreement with the Hafsid Ruler of Tunisia, Muhammed El-Mutawakkil IV, and settled in La Goulette in 1504. From then until 1513, and from 1513 onwards, they began to struggle with the Spanish and their allies on land and sea from their new base in Cherchell. However, since they lacked sufficient power to cope with the Spanish Navy, they sent gifts by ship in 1515 to the Ottoman Padishah Sultan Selim I, demonstrating their loyalty; in return, they were granted authority to collect ships and soldiers from the western Anatolian coasts. In this way, fighting began between the Ottoman Empire and the Spanish Empire over Algeria and Tunisia (which later became an all-out war).

=== Clash of overseas interests and globalization of war ===
Area of diplomatic participation of the Spanish Empire during the Ottoman–Habsburg wars and French–Habsburg rivalry

Since both empires coincided in development as great naval powers, they began to carry out large expeditions to increase their diplomatic rank, which involved more regional powers from different territories in the Spanish–Ottoman and Catholic-Islamic conflict—in some ways a world war—over the long-term. Moreover, after Ottoman emperors gained the title of Ottoman caliphs by overwhelming the Abbasid Dynasty after the Ottoman–Mamluk War (1516–1517), they were considered heads of the Dar as-Islam (Muslim world). They had the power to involve the rest of the Sunni Muslim states—particularly the Berber states, the Horn of Africa Sultanates, the Arabian Emirates, the Indian Sultanates, the Malaysian Sultanates, and the Indonesian sultanates affected by Iberian Colonialism—despite already having possession of the Ottoman Balkans, Levant, and Egypt. Also, Habsburg Spain was intimately bound with the Austrian branch of the Habsburg monarchy (the Holy Roman Empire, the Kingdom of Bohemia, and the Kingdom of Hungary-Croatia) and had possession of the Habsburg Netherlands and Italian domains (the Kingdom of Naples, the Kingdom of Sicily, the Kingdom of Sardinia, and the Duchy of Milan). The latter permitted closer ties with the Papal States—a universal power among the res publica Christiana (international community of Christian peoples and states)—and restoring the Gelasian political philosophy of Dominium Mundi to involve all Christendom against the Türkenkriege (Turkish wars) in Europe, as well as starting campaigns for the Catholic Church's potestas (power) over infidel societies outside Europe; this justified a first wave of European colonialism. This made the first stages of the Spanish–Ottoman struggle into a total global war between the Muslim world and Christendom for two purposes: conquest of a universal monarchy (i.e., the Pope and the Holy Roman Emperor against the Ottoman Caliph to be the King of Kings of the Abrahamic world) and suppression of the other "false religion". At the same time, they also sought to evangelize the pagans of Africa and Asia. They had two additional goals: a maximal goal of world domination, along with a minimal goal of being considered the successor to the Roman Empire and having political preponderance in Europe.

The first contacts were made with Safavid Iran via Petrus de Monte Libano (a Maronite ambassador), who developed a report to Shah Ismail I on the political situation in Europe and the greatness of Charles V, King of Spain and Holy Roman Emperor (including comparison with Charlemagne), as well as brother-in-law of King Louis II of Hungary. This information was provided to reach a potential ally for Persia against the Ottomans after the Turkish conquest of Egypt. The Republic of Venice was considered first, but it rejected the offers because of the Persian interest in including the Portuguese Empire (a rival of the Venetians in the spice trade) in the alliance, after Afonso de Albuquerque in Goa established good relations with the Safavids in 1513. Although Spanish envoy to the Mamluk Court, Peter Martyr d'Anghiera, heard about the Persian-Venetian conversations and communicated this to Pedro Fajardo. This communication included stories that the Shah was a powerful sovereign capable of challenging all the princes of the world, generating fascination among Spanish diplomats (who were already interested in Persia since the suggestion by Pope Leo X to Ferdinand II of Aragon of a mutual Catholic-Shia alliance between Portugal, the Castile-Aragon Union, Jagiellonian Hungary and Safavids against the Sunni Ottoman Caliphate). This motivated Spain to send missions to Persia in 1516–1519.

Thus a Habsburg–Persian alliance developed, and the Persians in 1524 proposed to Habsburg Spain the development of a two-front war against the Ottoman Empire, on the condition of not concluding separate peace treaties. In addition, Charles V communicated to the Persians about the French–Habsburg rivalry and the need for Persian support against a possible Franco-Ottoman alliance. However, the subsequent Shah Tahmasp I encountered logistical difficulties in implementing the agreements reached, because of delayed communications (between 7 and 8 years due to technological deficiencies). However, the Persians and the Spanish were de facto allies, and Ottoman war plans always included securing the border with Persia when campaigning against Spain, and vice versa. Even Álvaro de Bazán testified in his chronicles that Suleiman the Magnificent feared a two-front war against Spain and Persia. To support this project, Persians under Qadi Jahan Qazvini reinforced their contacts with the Portuguese, the Venetians, the Mughals, and the Shiite Deccan sultanates. This approach also influenced Portuguese maritime exploration, which brought news of the Turkish-Iranian Wars (with many victories for the Persians until the Battle of Chaldiran) and testimonies about the travels of explorers. These explorers included both foreigners—such as the Italian Ludovico de Varthema—and Spaniards such as Martín Fernández de Figueroa (a Spanish soldier in the Portuguese Empire during his expeditions to the Persian Gulf and India). He published the book Tratado de la conquista de las Islas de Persia y Arabia (Treaty of the conquest of the Islands of Persia and Arabia), edited by Juan Agüero de Trasmiera. Ferdinand Columbus told King Charles I that Spain had the right to conquer Persia.

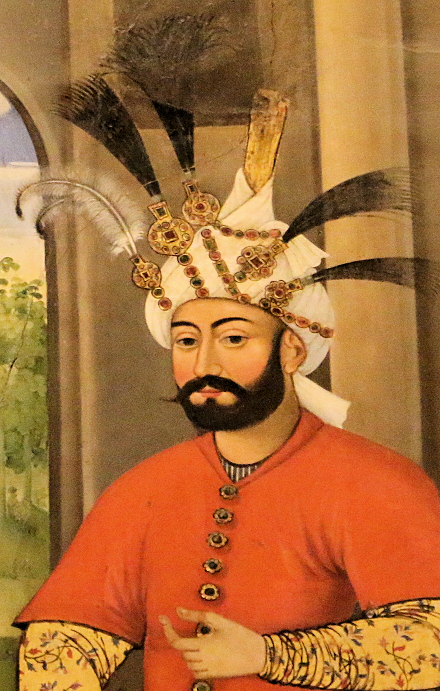
Shah Tahmasp, Persian ruler who developed an alliance with Habsburg Spain against the Ottomans

In turn, Spaniards such as Martín de Salinas became involved as intermediaries for embassies from other European powers to Persia, especially ones that were favorable to the Habsburg Empire of Charles V—in his case, serving the Archduchy of Austria of Franz Ferdinand, brother of Charles, who in 1524 communicated that a Persian ambassador would arrive in Burgos to communicate with Charles. This was in response to the proposals of alliance with the HRE that were sent by Ferdinand of Austria. Another Persian embassy arrived in Spain in late 1528, with ambassador Gabriel Sánchez imploring the Persians to expedite the conclusion of joint operations during 1529. Therefore, another ambassador, Jean de Balbi (a Savoyard of the Order of Saint John of Jerusalem), was sent via Portuguese Goa. His assignment was to report on the latest developments in Europe (especially the Treaty of Madrid (1526), the League of Cognac, and the Battle of Mohács), commit the Persians to the alliance, and ensure unity against the common enemy. Later, in the 1540s, another Persian emissary visited Charles V in Germany, and a covert mission was also sent to Spain (possibly carried out by the Venetian Michele Membré); however, there is no precise information about the meeting. All of these communications between Iberia, Italy, Germany, Hungary, and Persia revealed the existence of a formal anti-Ottoman coalition led by Spanish diplomats.

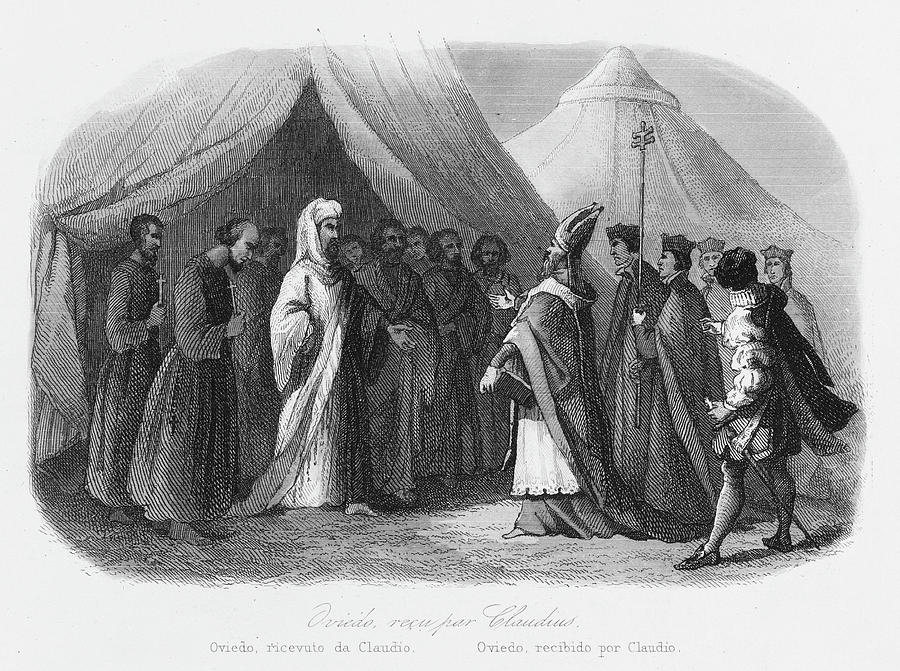
The Emperor of Ethiopia, Gelawdewos, receiving the Latin Patriarch and Spanish Jesuit, Andrés de Oviedo

The Ethiopian Empire also became involved; this was an Eastern Christian nation of interest to King Alfonso V of Aragon, who wanted to ally with Yeshaq I and Zara Yaqob against the Mamluks of Egypt and the Ottoman Turks. The Ethiopian monarchy increased its foreign relations with Europe with the primary objective of obtaining assistance in the Ottoman wars in Africa. This, in turn, made Ethiopia from 1500 to 1672 a part of the Kingdom of Portugal's sphere of influence—after the embassy of Pêro da Covilhã in 1493 in search of Prester John, and the Cristóvão da Gama expedition of 1541–1543)—and then of Habsburg Spain's sphere through the Iberian Union since 1580, and previously through Ignatian missionaries in the service of John III of Portugal. (These included Andrés de Oviedo, who presided over the first permanent Roman Catholic mission to the Ethiopian Catholic Church since 1557.)

The years 1556–1632 were essential because of the political influence of the Jesuits in the internal affairs of the Solomonic dynasty, despite logistical problems because of the Turkish military—Pope Gregory XIII did not wish to quit the Jesuit mission in Ethiopia because he feared losing that Christian country to the Muslim world—being relevant to the influence of Spanish missionaries. These included Pedro Páez, who converted Emperor Susenyos I, who in turn wanted to Catholicize his country despite hostility from the Ethiopian Orthodox Tewahedo Church. The Iberians believed that the alliance with the Ethiopians would facilitate their control of maritime traffic through the Red Sea. This objective, with the rise of Ottoman power in the area, became one of the unresolved issues for the Portuguese crown during its expansion in the Eastern Hemisphere (as stipulated with Spain in the Treaty of Tordesillas), as well as the ambitious project of Manuel of Portugal and Philip II of Spain to destroy the centers of Islam in Arabia and Egypt.

== Declared war ==
=== The struggle between Oruç Reis and Hayreddin Barbarossa with Ottoman support (1515–1529) ===
The Barbarossa brothers, who came under the protection of Sultan Selim in 1515, captured the city of Algiers in 1516 after a delegation from Algeria asked for their help against the Spanish Army. After Aruj Barbarossa (known as Oruç Reis to the Turks) was declared the Sultan of Algeria in Cherchell, he captured Ténès and Tlemcen; he expanded his territory to Morocco, but he lost his life in the Spanish counter-attack of May 1518. Tlemcen fell back into the hands of the Zayenids under Spanish protection.

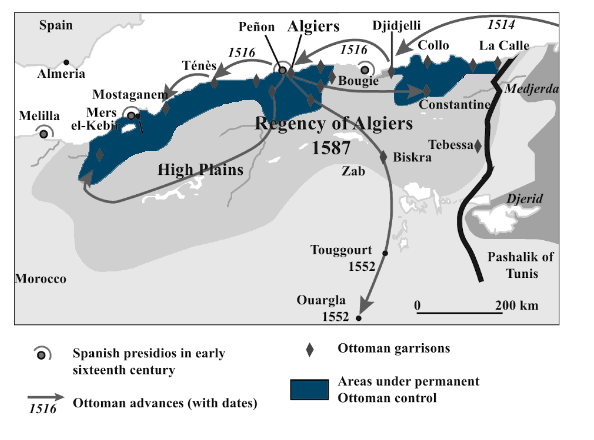
Ottoman advance in Algeria

By contrast, the Ottoman conquest of Egypt ended in 1517, consolidating the Ottoman naval presence in the Mediterranean Sea beyond the Balkans and Anatolia, while introducing it into the Red Sea—thereby starting a new series of Ottoman wars in Africa and Asia, which then caused it to clash with Spanish expansionist campaigns in the Maghreb and Portuguese maritime exploration on the Indian Ocean. Another consequence was that the Ottoman dynasty obtained the Ottoman Caliphate, which made it the Sultan of Sultans among all Sunni Muslims. (This was nominally from Morocco to Muslim India and Indonesia, although initially only Arab states who currently recognized the Abbasids or were menaced by Portuguese India Armadas submitted to the Ottoman political bodies.) Therefore the Ottoman dynasty was considered by Muslim Barbary corsairs to be their natural protectors; it was also considered by Catholic societies to be the political head of a unified Muslim world that could threaten Christianity at any moment because of the Ottoman Empire's bellicose policies.

Hayreddin Barbarossa replaced Oruç Reis; in October 1519, he sent a delegation of Algerian dignitaries and Muslim jurists to Sultan Selim with a petition from the Algerian people requesting assistance and annexation by the Ottoman Empire. This solicitation, which generated initial hesitation among the Turks, was answered positively by Suleiman the Magnificent, who then turned the Regency of Algiers into an Ottoman Eyalet (administrative division) in 1521.

Meanwhile, the Portuguese Empire—an ally of Spain whose delegated task was fighting Muslim states on the Mar de África (African coast outside the Mediterranean) according to the spheres of influence in the Treaty of Alcáçovas—began developing factories on the Swahili coast and the Gulf of Aden, in order to accomplish two goals: fighting against Ottoman corsairs on the Indian Ocean, and expanding their economic and military presence in the region while menacing the security of the Egypt Eyalet and the holiest sites in Islam. However, the admiral Selman Reis defeated the Portuguese Empire on Kamaran Island; he later led an expedition into the interior of Yemen to subdue the area. This benefited the Ottomans in consolidating their naval presence on the Red Sea and their land presence in South Arabia, stopping the Portuguese raids after 1527 and increasing their international prestige among Asian states (such as the Vizier of Hormuz or the Zamorin of Calicut).

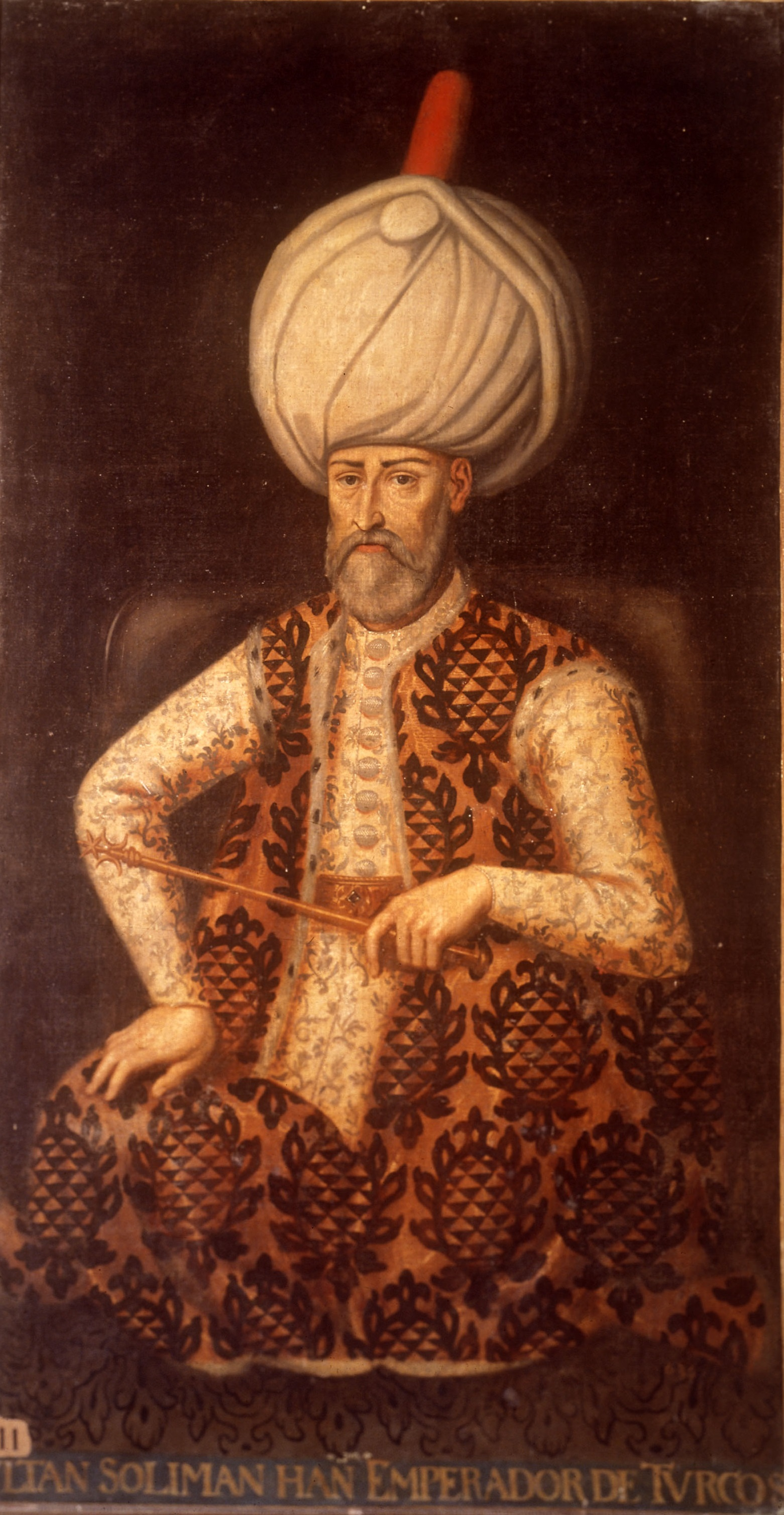
Ottoman Sultan and self-proclaimed Kaiser-i-Rum (Caesar of Rome), Suleiman the Magnificent

=== Spanish counter-offensive (1529–1541) ===
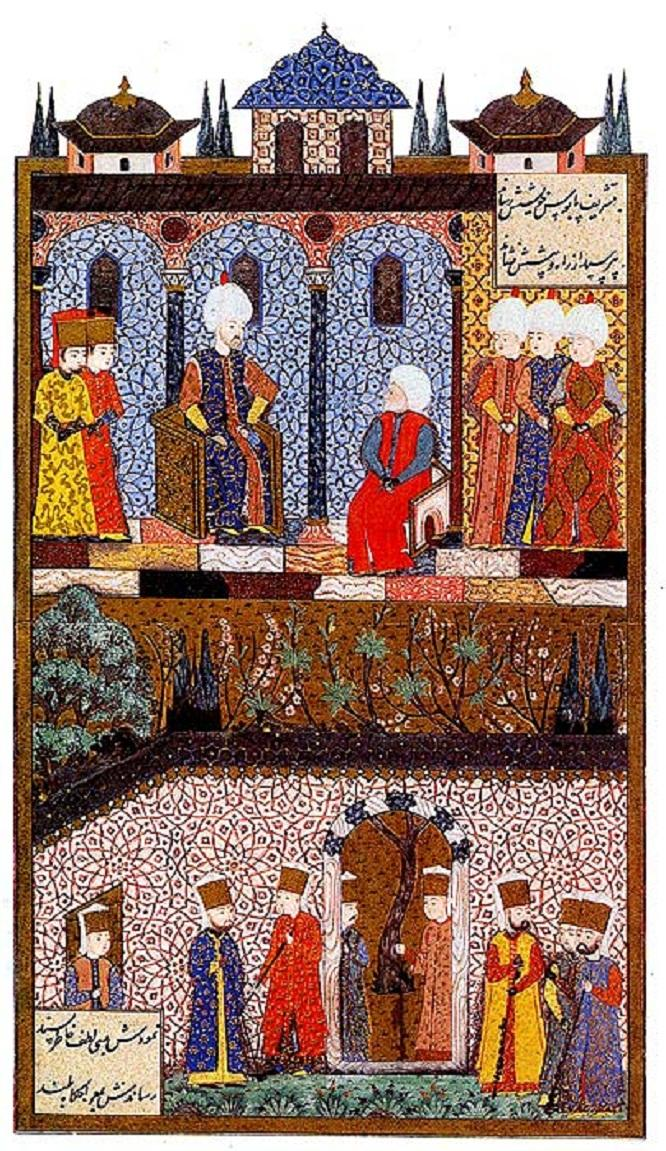
Suleiman the Magnificent's reception of Hayreddin Barbarossa (1533)

The loss of the island of Algiers caused a major shock in Spain. In 1529, a Spanish fleet of 10 ships carrying reinforcements to the besieged island was destroyed by the skillful counter-attack of Hayreddin Barbarossa, who had already passed the island. In July 1531, the 50-man Spanish-Genoese fleet—under the command of Genoese admiral Andrea Doria—suffered an even greater defeat in the Cherchell Campaign. Likewise, the Ottomans in 1534 were able to recapture the port of Koroni (at the tip of the Morea peninsula), which Italian admiral Giovanni Andrea Doria had captured in 1532.

During this period, another war front opened for the Spanish Monarchy in Central Europe during the Little War in Hungary (1526–1568). In this war, after the Battle of Mohács, Charles summoned the Spanish Cortes (political body) in Valladolid, requesting Spanish military assistance for the Holy Roman Empire, Austria, and Habsburg Hungary; the goal was to prevent the Turks from advancing into Hungary, Germany, and Italy. (Charles argued that Spanish interests were menaced there and also in Christendom as a whole.) As a result, after 1529, Charles V and Mary of Hungary sent a Spanish expeditionary force. This force was composed of the Tercio of Flanders (an army unit that also included Italians and Portuguese), which fought alongside Germans, Flemish, Czechs, Slovaks, Croats, Hungarians, and Romanians in major battles of the 1529–1533 campaign. These battles included the first Siege of Vienna and the second Siege of Buda. The force also participated in the battles of the Hungarian castles, in defense of the fortresses of Visegrád, Szeged, Lippa, and Timisoara for Ferdinand I of Hungary; this defense was against the Ottoman puppet John Zápolya of Hungary, with his Transylvanian, Moldavian, Serbian, and Turkish troops. Some subjects of Habsburg Spain that resalted in the Austro-Hungarian theater were Luis de Ávalos, Luis de la Cueva y Toledo, Luis de Guevara, Juan de Salinas, Jaime García de Guzmán, Jorge Manrique, Cristóbal de Aranda, John of God, Bernaldo de Aldana, Hurtado de Mendoza, Gianbattista Castaido, and Caste Lluvio. However, the year 1533 also included important turning points in the Ottoman–Spanish War. Indeed, the Ottoman Empire signed a peace treaty for the first time with the Holy Roman Empire, which also included the Spanish Empire. With this treaty, the war between the Ottomans and the Austrian Archduchy on the Hungarian front ended; nevertheless, the war with other vassals of the Holy Roman Empire (i.e., the Spanish Empire, the Kingdom of Naples and the Republic of Genoa) not covered by the treaty continued uninterrupted in the Mediterranean. The Siege of Agadir (1533) occurred that same year between Moroccans (backed by the Ottomans) and the Portuguese (backed by the Spaniards); the siege was won by the latter.

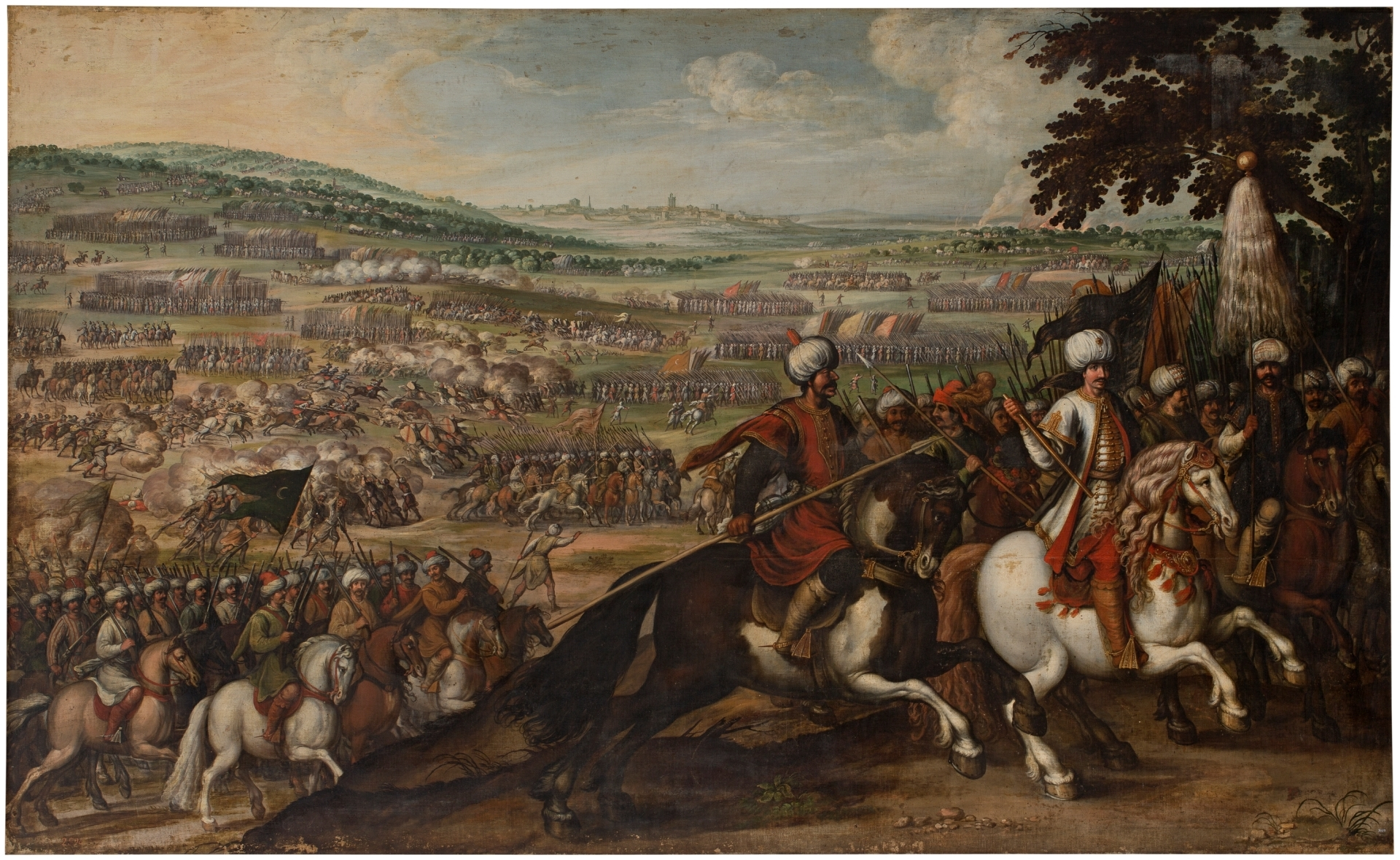
The Turks abandon the outskirts of Vienna in 1532 (Prado Museum, Juan de la Corte)

In a second important development in 1533, the Ottoman fleet under the command of Kemankeş Ahmed Paşa, who wanted to retake Koroni, was ineffective against the Genoese fleet; the Ottoman capital turned to Hayreddin Barbarossa and the Turkish leaders for a stronger fleet in the Mediterranean. Barbarossa, who was called to Istanbul in 1532, was appointed Kapudan Pasha in 1533. Barbarossa, who set sail for the Mediterranean with the strong fleet that he had prepared during the winter of 1533–1534, devastated the coasts of the Kingdom of Naples and then conquered Tunis on 16 August 1534.

This strategic move by the Ottomans caused the attention of the Holy Roman Emperor Charles V to turn fully toward the Mediterranean. In 1535, Charles V personally led an expedition and regained Tunis in June; this was accomplished with the help of a Christian coalition among Spain, the HRE, the Italian states, and Portugal (which was already in its own Ottoman wars since 1517 in the Indian Ocean and the Horn of Africa). In response, Hayreddin Barbarossa, who managed to smuggle his fleet to Annaba, sailed to the Western Mediterranean and invaded Minorca, one of the Balearic Islands of the Spanish Empire. In September, a Spanish attack on Tlemcen was also repelled by the Ottomans.

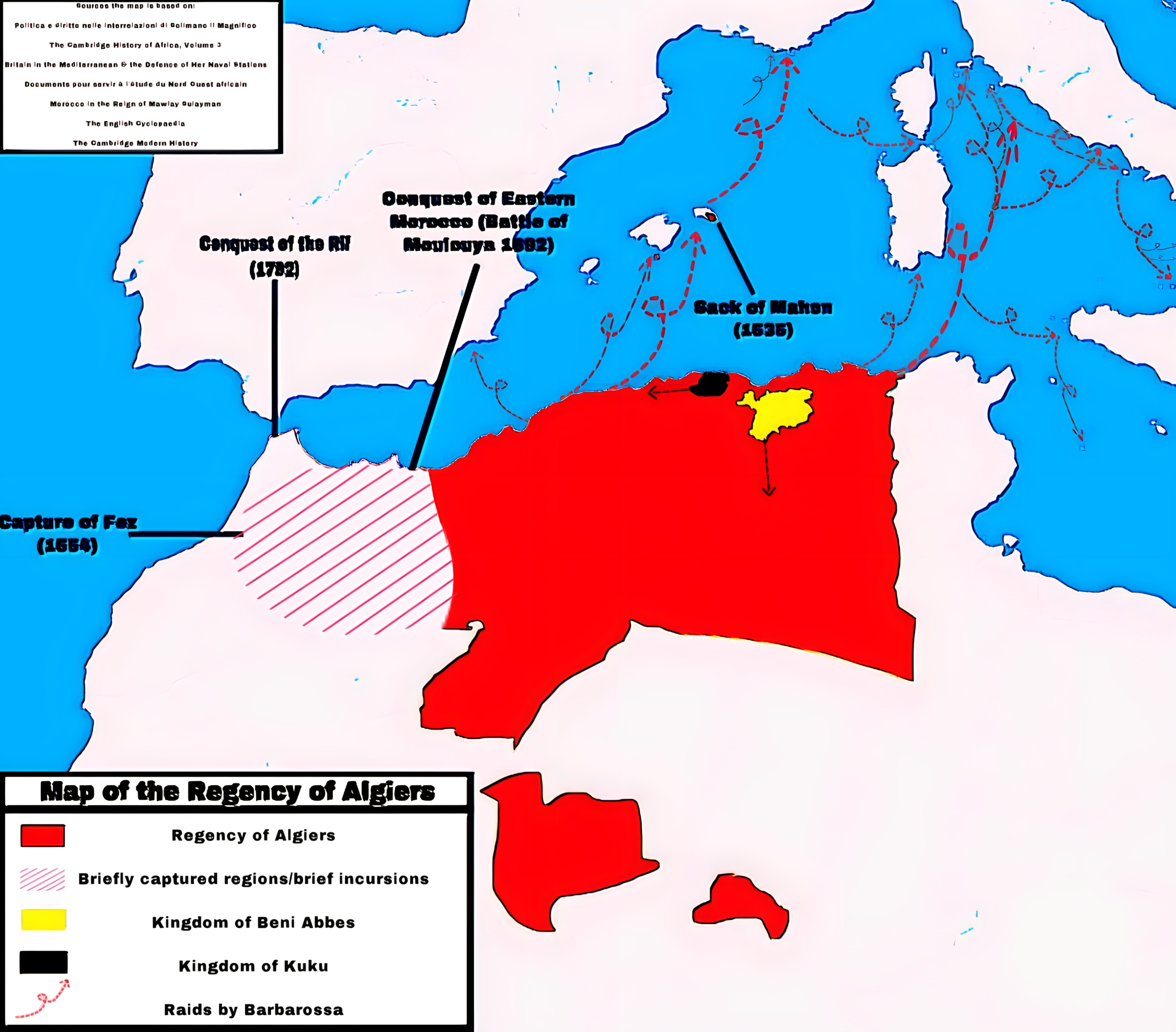
Barbary corsairs' raids during Hayreddin Barbarossa's rule over the Regency of Algiers

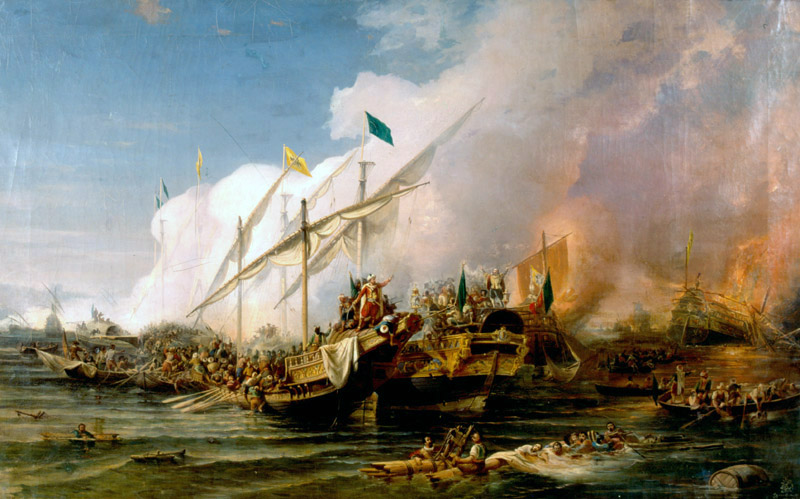
Battle of Preveza (1538)

In 1537, the Ottoman Navy under the command of Barbarossa, together with the Ottoman troops under the command of Lütfi Pasha, invaded Apulia, part of the Kingdom of Naples. However, Andrea Doria inflicted a defeat on their rear guardin the Battle of Antipaxos. The Ottoman–Venetian War with the Republic of Venice began in the same year. With the encouragement of Pope Paul III, the Holy League was then formed with the participation of Venice, the Spanish Empire, the Papal States, the Republic of Genoa, and the Knights of Malta. However, at the Battle of Preveza on 28 September, 1538, the Ottoman Navy under the command of Barbarossa won a major victory over a Christian navy that also included 50 Spanish galleons and 61 Genoese-Papal warships. Doria was criticized as having possibly thrown the battle, while Spanish sources picture a Venetian betrayal.

Castelnuovo (Herceg Novi) was captured by the Genoese admiral Andrea Doria (in the service of Habsburg Spain) that same year to be used as a base against the Ottomans in the future. Castelnuovo was recaptured by Barbarossa in 1539 during a siege in which the 6,000-man Spanish garrison was annihilated. During the Spanish occupation of Herceg Novi, they made incursions into Dubrovnik to defend the interests of Habsburg Croatia and the Republic of Ragusa. This was the last military operation of the Spanish Empire in the Eastern Mediterranean until the Battle of Lepanto. In 1540, an Ottoman fleet from Algeria invaded Gibraltar. However, the Spanish Navy balanced the situation with success in the Battle of Alborán. Meanwhile, the Spanish-Genoese fleet under the command of Giannettino Doria defeated another Ottoman fleet in the Battle of Girolata on 15 June 1540; it also captured Turgut Reis. Taking advantage of Turgut Reis' defeat, Andrea Doria set sail from Messina in the summer of 1540; he had a fleet of more than 80 ships (51 galleys, along with more than 30 galleys and fustas) and 14 Spanish infantry divisions led by García de Toledo, the Governor General of Sicily in the Kingdom of Spain. Andrea Doria landed in Tunis, capturing the fortresses of Monastir, Sousse, Hammamet, and Kelibia held by the Hafsids, thereby expanding Spanish rule in Tunis.

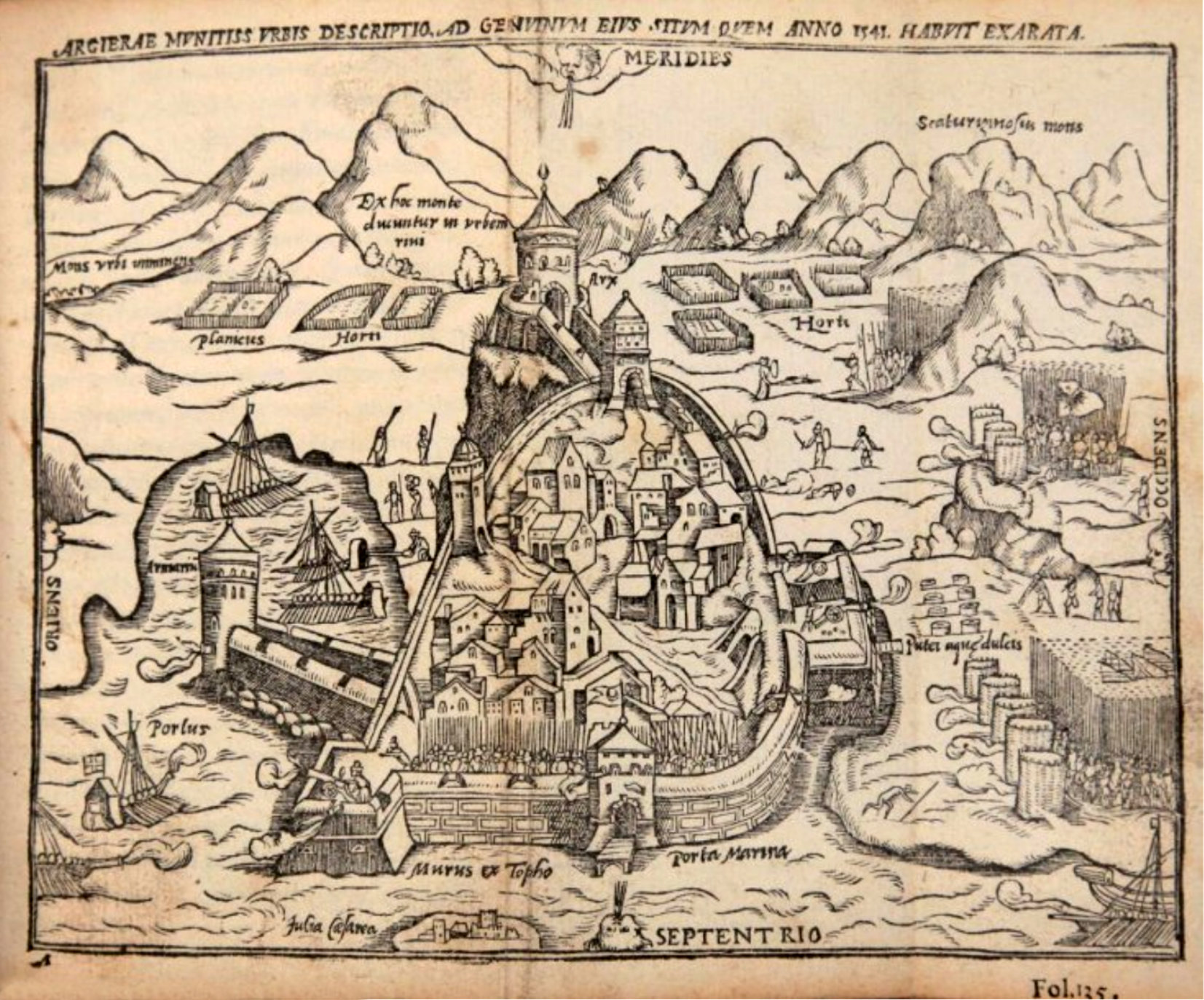
Algiers expedition (1541)

The year 1541 marked the peak of Spain's attacks, which had been occurring since 1529. After Barbarossa rejected an offer to take command of the Holy Roman Empire's navy, Charles V gathered a large navy (580 ships, along with 36,000 sailors and soldiers), but it was devastated by a storm during the Algiers Naval Expedition of 1541. He thus suffered a major defeat in front of Algiers, which was defended by Ottoman regent Hasan Ağa. However, two years later, the Spanish expedition to Tlemcen (1543) was launched, in which the Spanish force defeated the Zayyanids from the Kingdom of Tlemcen (supported by Ottoman Algeria and Wattasid Morocco). The expedition ended in complete success, as Abu Abdallah VI was restored to the throne as a Spanish vassal.

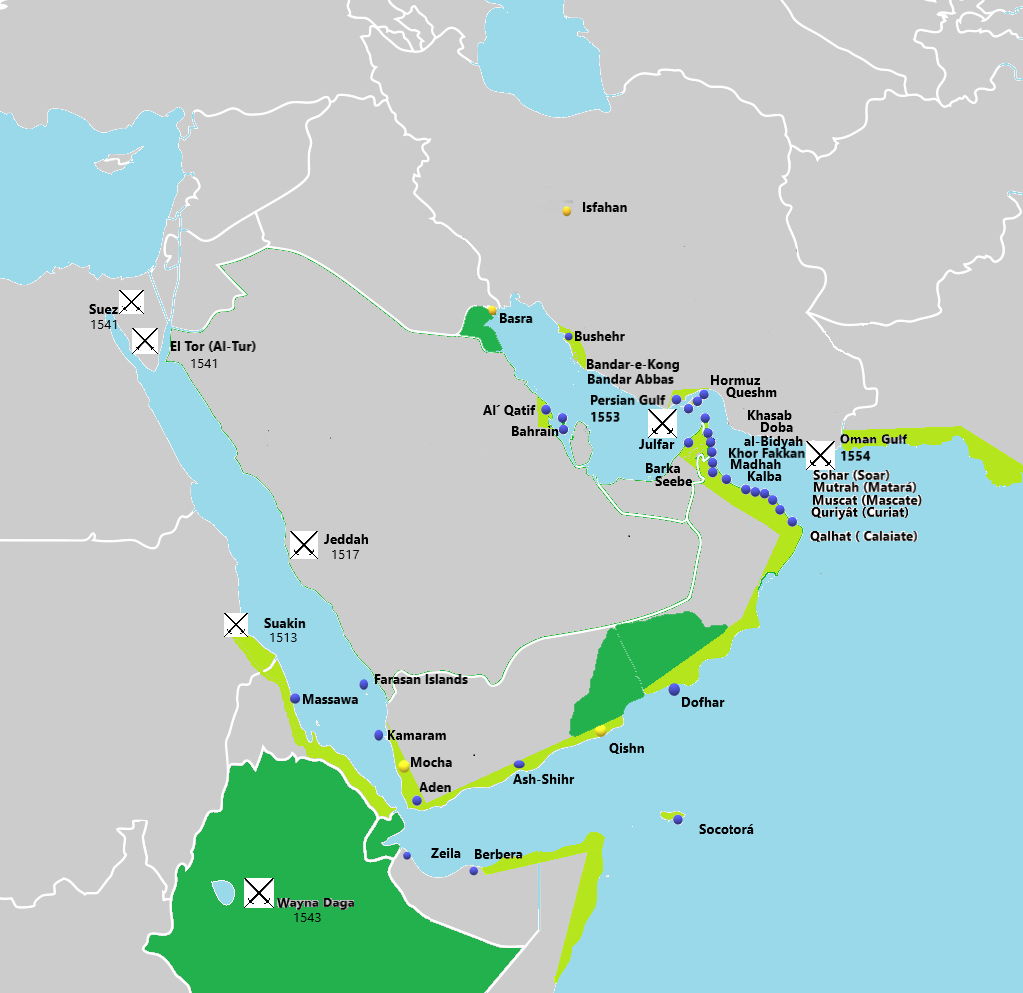
Ottoman–Portuguese conflicts (1538–1560)

In the Portuguese theater, the Ottomans became allies of Bahadur Shah's Gujarat Sultanate and Ahmad ibn Ibrahim al-Ghazi's Adal Sultanate. Their main goal was to continue the Mamluk Egypt–Portuguese conflicts, as well as developing its naval and economic power at the recently conquered Suez Port. Accordingly, in 1538, an Ottoman–Egyptian expeditionary force led by Hadım Suleiman Pasha was sent to Diu to help Gujarat and establish Ottoman influence in the Indian Ocean. However, they were defeated by the Portuguese Indian militia (although they conquered Ottoman Yemen on the return of the expedition). Then the Portuguese sent navigator Estêvão da Gama to lead a military expedition to Suez in 1541; the main goal was to crush the Red Sea's Ottoman fleet (the main Turkish navy that served to intervene on the Indian Ocean). Although initially victorious at the Battle of Suakin, the campaign ended in a military stalemate that was politically favorable for the Ottomans. (The Portuguese withdrew from Egypt after the Attack on Jeddah and the Battle of Suez because of stagnation.) However, the campaign was economically favorable for the Portuguese, because Muslim trade in the Red Sea was blocked from the Gulf of Aden. Moreover, the Portuguese could raid there, as shown in the Battle of El Tor; in addition, they intervened in the Ethiopian–Adal War, although they were initially crushed in the Battle of Massawa. Despite recent failures, the corsair Piri Reis—famous for developing an accurate nautical map of the world—was appointed Hind Kapudan-ı Derya (grand admiral of the Ottoman Fleet in the Indian Ocean) to lead campaigns in the Red Sea and the Persian Gulf (taking advantage of the recent Ottoman conquest of Basra). The Fall of Agadir also occurred in 1541, a major defeat in which the Saadians expelled the Portuguese Empire from Agadir (in Morocco). In consequence, King John III ordered the evacuation of Portuguese positions at Azemmour and Safi, which were too expensive to maintain without Agadir; the primary goal was building a more defensible position at Mazagão instead.

=== Ottomans took war to the Western Mediterranean (1542–1559) ===
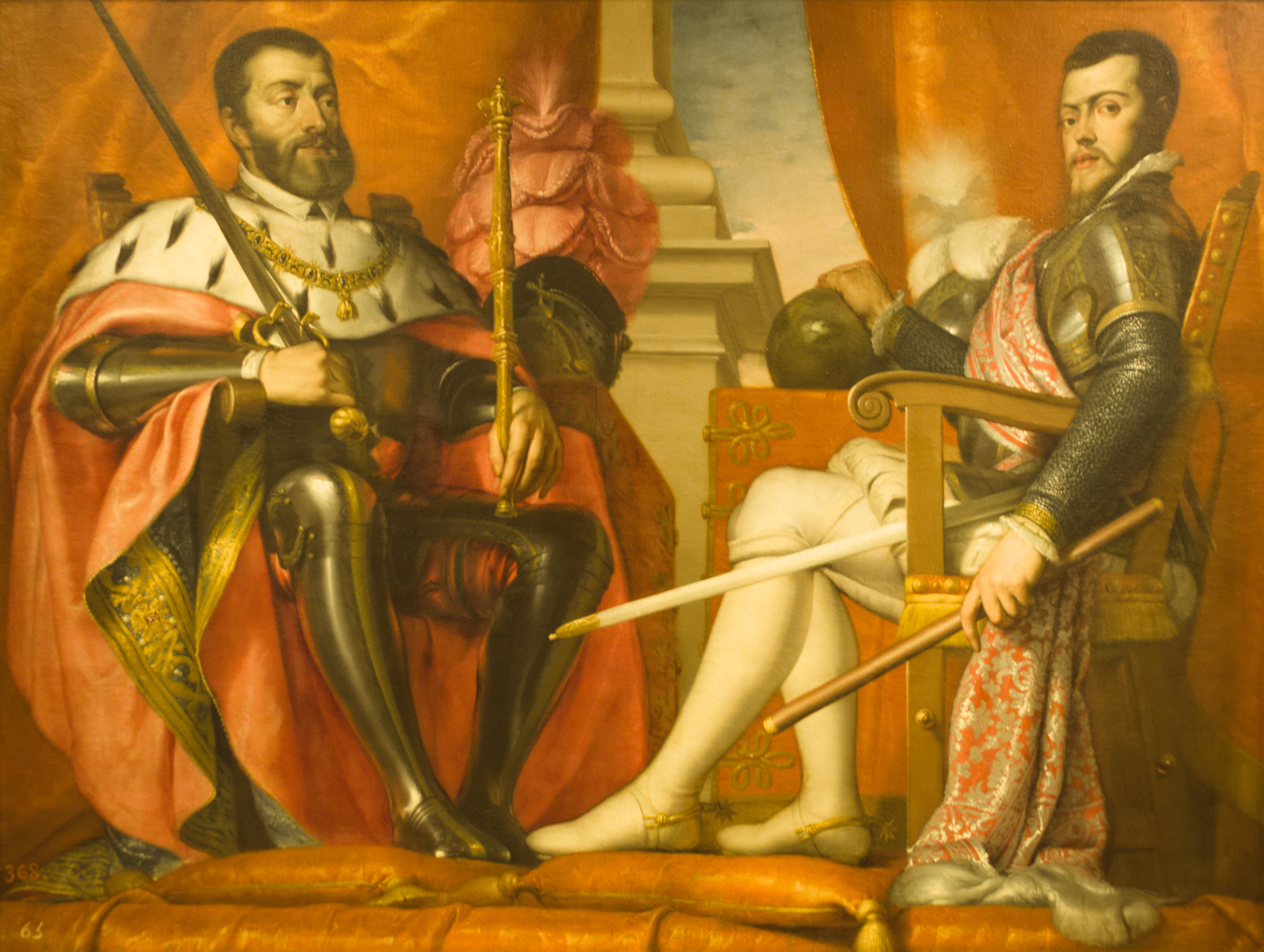
Charles V, Holy Roman Emperor, and Philip II of Spain, the main Spanish rulers who defied the Ottoman Caliphate

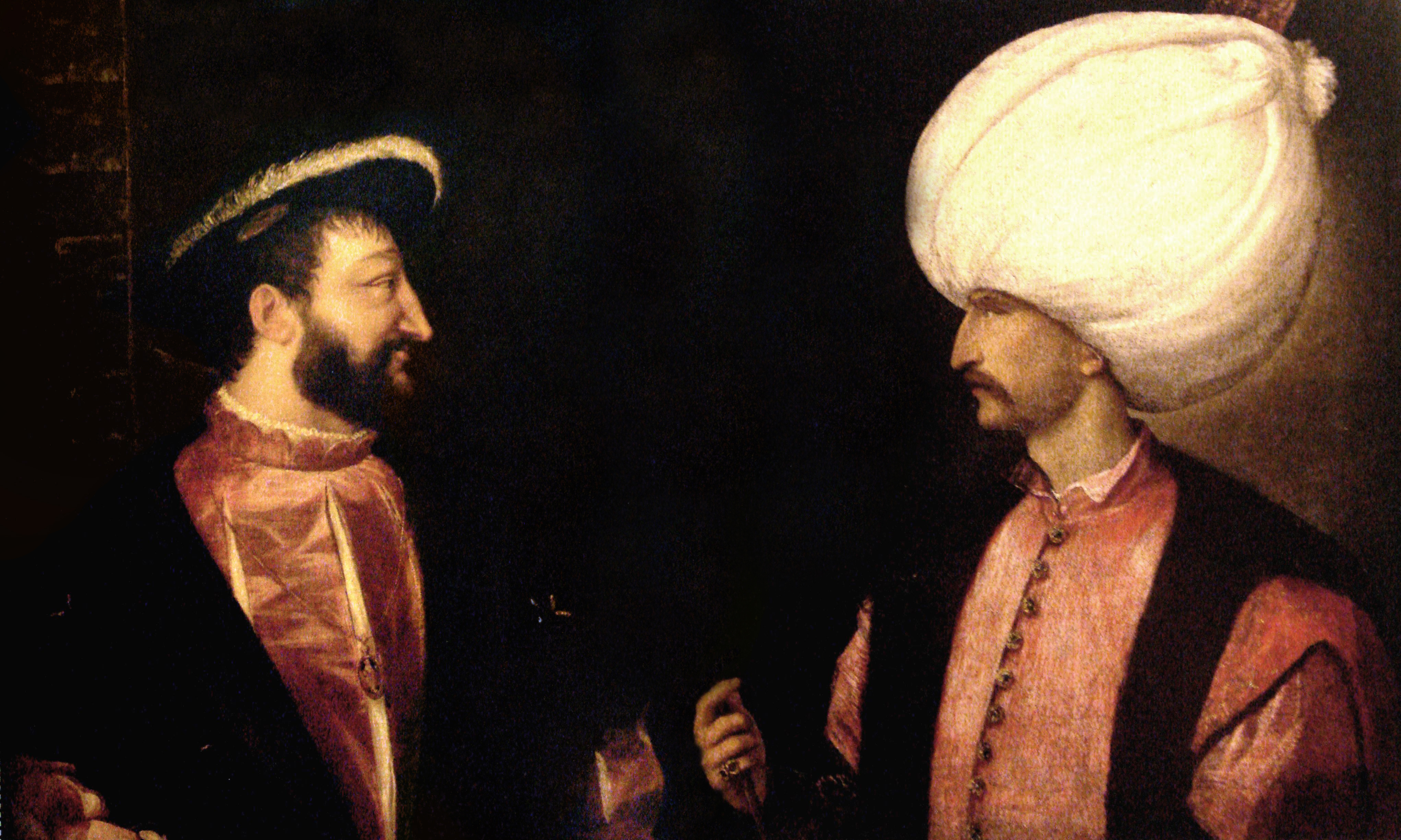
Francis I of France and Suleiman the Magnificent, the most important rivals of Charles V, established a Franco-Ottoman alliance in 1535 directed against Habsburg Spain

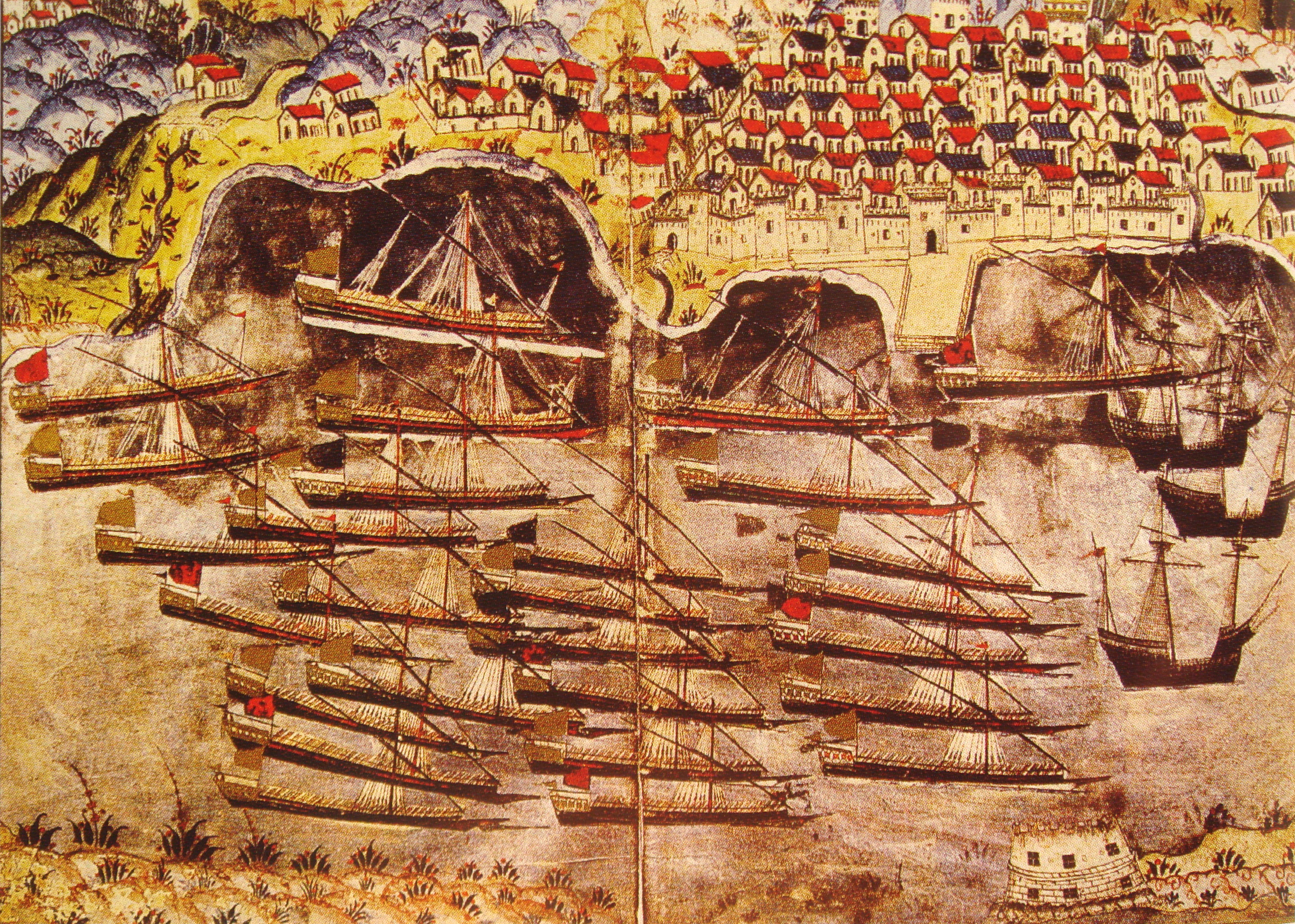
Ottoman wintering in Toulon

The Holy Roman Empire's major defeat in Algeria temporarily ended Spanish attacks on Ottoman territories; the Ottomans carried the struggle to the Western Mediterranean, where the Spanish Empire was the dominant element. With the Ottoman Empire's involvement in the Italian Wars within the framework of its alliance with France, the Ottoman fleet under the command of Barbarossa invaded ports held by the Kingdom of Naples, the Papal States, the Republic of Genoa, and the Duchy of Savoy in 1543; it wintered in Toulon during the winter of 1543–1544, continuing its operations on these coasts in 1544. Also in 1543, the Expedition to Mostaganem was launched by Count Alcaudete, although it was defeated by Ottoman–Algerian forces. In 1546, the important Turkish sailor Hayreddin Barbarossa died.

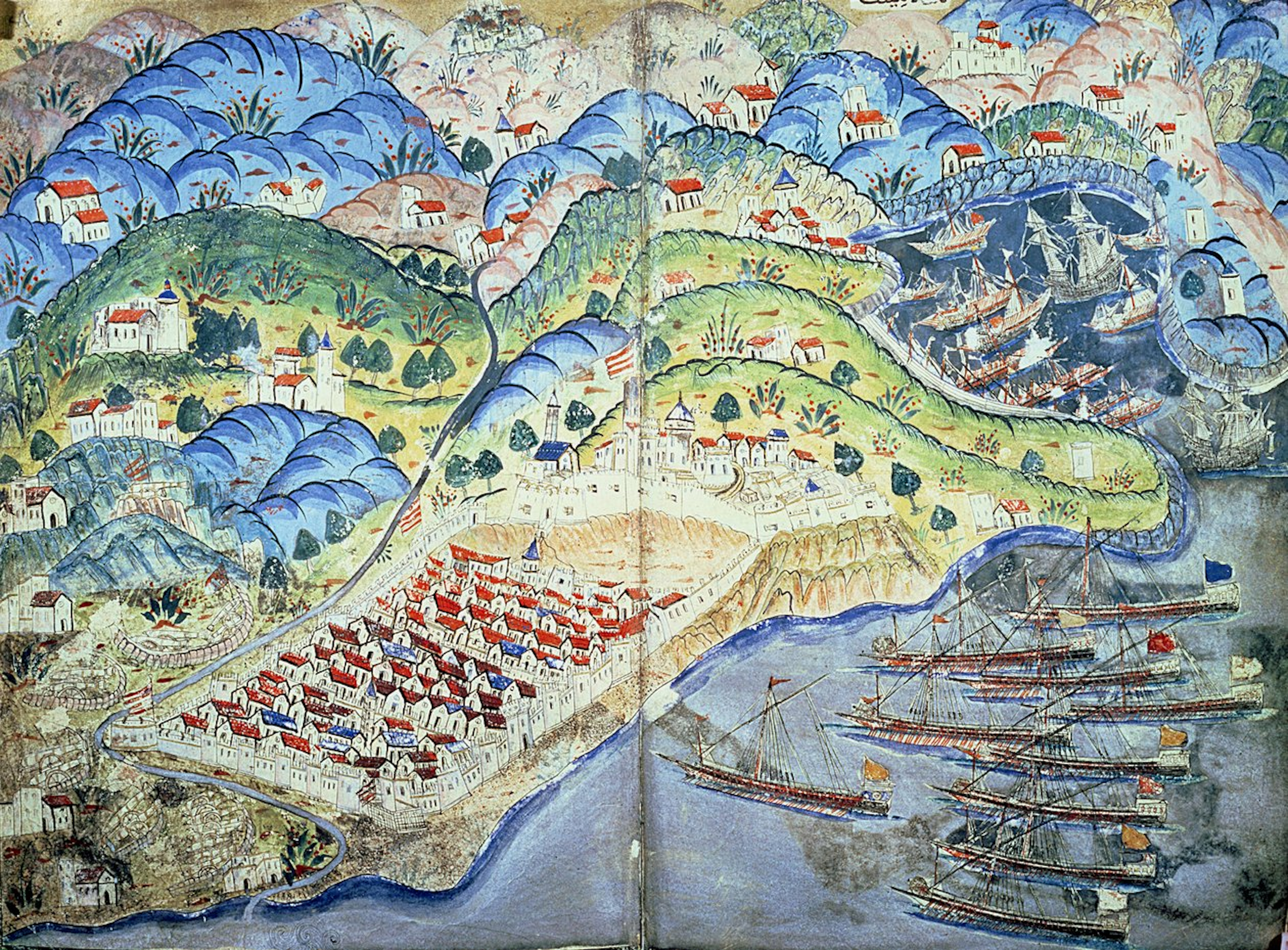
Siege of Nice in Matrakçı Nasuh's miniature (1543)

Meanwhile, because of a throne dispute in the Kingdom of Hungary, which was subject to the Ottomans, the Ottoman Empire and the Holy Roman Empire began a new war in 1540. In this context, the two empires continued their fierce struggle in the Mediterranean and Hungary. After the Ottomans emerged victorious from the war, the parties signed a ceasefire in 1545 and a peace treaty in 1547, and they entered a period of relative calm in the Mediterranean. Nevertheless, another Spanish expeditionary force to Hungary was sent in 1548; it was composed of the Tercio Viejo de Nápoles (which included Italians and Germans) under the leadership of Bernardo de Aldana and Giovanni Battista Castaldo. They fought in the Transdanubia region until 1554 against the oligarchs of Northern Hungary and Slovakia, as well as the Transylvanians, Romanians, French, and Turks who supported them. The Spaniards defended Habsburg Hungary in Csábrág, Léva, Murány, Szolnok, and Temesvár. (However, there they surrendered the fort of Lippa with no resistance because of economic problems, which caused Aldana's enemies to imprison him in Trencsén until 1556.) Their greatest successes were the suppression of robber knights on the Hungarian Highlands; the reconstruction of Szolnok; and the occupation of Ottoman Transylvania that briefly deposed John Sigismund Zápolya from 1551 to 1556.

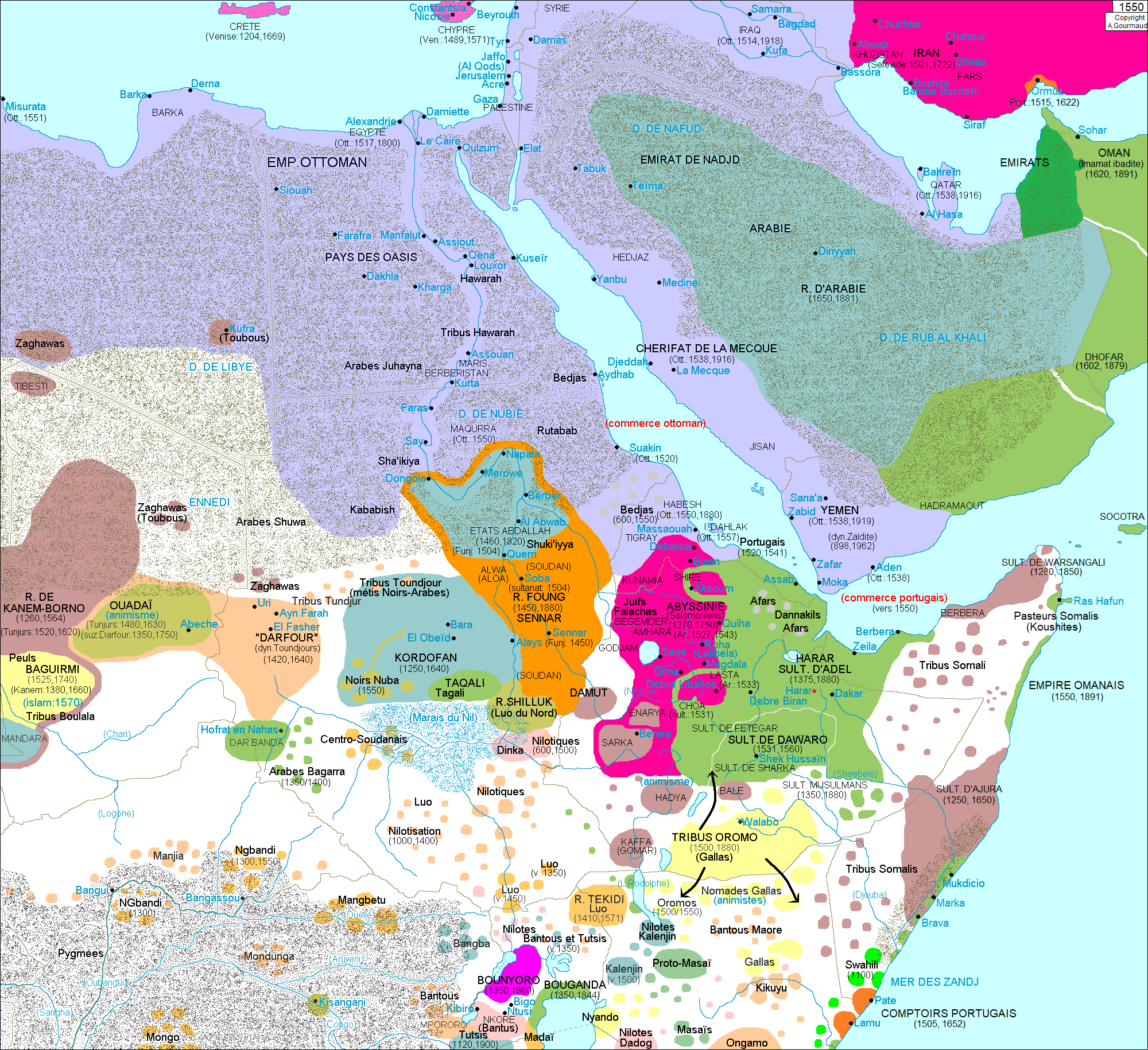
Map of Northeast Africa, in which a proxy war was occurring between the pro-Portuguese Ethiopian Empire (lilac color) and pro-Ottoman Adal Sultanate (light-green color)

Around the same time, on the Horn of Africa, there was a religious war between the Oriental Orthodox Christian Ethiopian Empire (which requested help from European monarchies) and the Sunni Muslim Adal Sultanate (backed by Muslim Somalis and the Ottoman Empire from the Yemen Eyalet) starting in 1529. This war was due to the expansionist ambitions of Ahmad ibn Ibrahim al-Ghazi (called O Granhe or "the left-handed" by the Portuguese). In 1542, an ally of Habsburg Spain in the Ottoman War—the Portuguese Empire under Estêvão da Gama (governor of Portuguese India)—answered those requests for help; this answer was influenced by the previous Adal-Portuguese Battle of Massawa of 1541 in modern Eritrea. Accordingly, the Portuguese Empire sent an expeditionary corps of 400 soldiers led by Cristóvão da Gama to assist the isolated Christian Negus Negust (King of Kings)—the Ethiopian emperor Gelawdewos. The corps was victorious at the Battle of Baçente and the Battle of Jarte (in which the Turkish contingent was nearly exterminated). In response, the Ottomans sent a new contingent of 1900 Turks, 2,000 Arabs, and some Albanians, who were victorious at the Battle of Wofla (killing half of the Portuguese corps, including Estêvão da Gama); however, the Ethiopian-Portuguese troops then won decisively at the Battle of Wayna Daga in 1543. This victory ensured the independence of Ethiopia and the survival of Ethiopian Christianity in the Ethiopian Highlands. Military engagements also took place in two locations: on the Portuguese war front on the Indian subcontinent at the Siege of Diu (1546), which resulted in Portuguese victory against the Ottoman–Gujarati coalition; and on the Arabian Peninsula at the Capture of Aden (1548), which resulted in Ottoman victory against a Portuguese-Yemeni insurgent coalition (which was a decisive expulsion of the Portuguese Empire from Yemen).

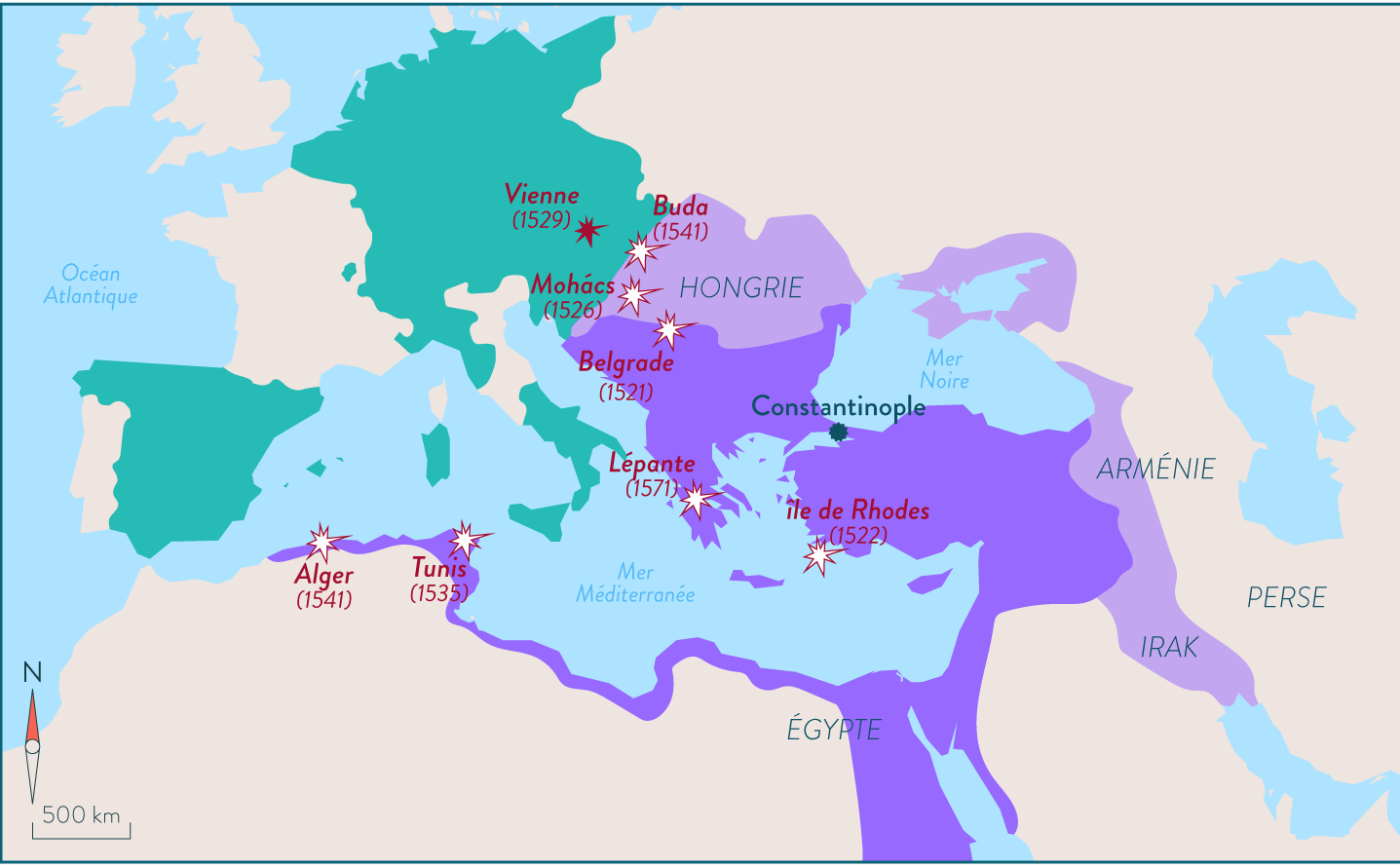
Ottoman–Habsburg wars at their peak in the 16th century. Habsburg Spain participated in all theaters of war in Europe

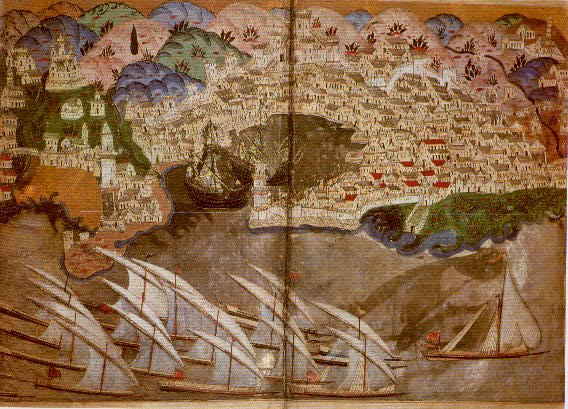
Ottoman Navy in front of Genoa

Despite other fronts, there was a brief peace from Ottoman military incursions into the Spanish Domains after 1545. However, the calm between these parties was short-lived: the Spanish Empire sent a fleet in June 1550 to capture the Ottoman fortress of Mahdia in Tunisia, and Emperor Ferdinand's efforts to recapture Hungary and Transylvania through George Martinuzzi led to the start of a new war that lasted until 1562. In this war, Turgut Reis, who assumed leadership of the Ottoman fleet, and Piyale Pasha, who was appointed Kapudan Pasha in 1553, brought Ottoman military presence in the Western Mediterranean to its peak, in defiance of the Spanish Empire.

The Mediterranean was the scene of larger-scale operations and important victories for the Ottomans. The operations of the Ottoman Navy in the Mediterranean, in alliance with the Kingdom of France against the Holy Roman Empire, led to the start of an Italian War that lasted from 1551 until 1559.

- 1551: The Ottoman Navy invaded the island of Gozo, which belonged to the Knights of Malta, one of Spain's allies, in July; in addition, they conquered Tripoli with land support from Libyan Arabs as a result of a siege from 14 to 15 August. Meanwhile, the Ottomans from Algeria launched the Campaign of Tlemcen (1551) against Spanish, Zayyanids, and Saadi Moroccan forces, changing the borders in favor of the Algerian Regency. The Siege of Qatif (1551) took place simultaneously, in July, against the Portuguese Empire at the Kingdom of Hormuz. In this siege, the Ottomans from the Basra Eyalet were defeated by the Portuguese (with the help of Safavid Persia, who were in their own conflict with the Turks).
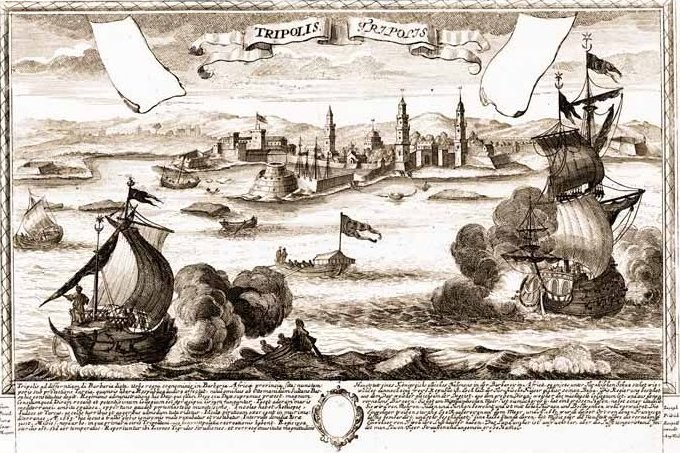
  Ottoman Conquest of Tripoli
- 1552: The Ottoman Navy sailed to the Western Mediterranean; invaded Calabria, which was part of the Kingdom of Naples; and (with the help of the French Navy) defeated the Genoese navy (backed by the Spanish Navy) under the command of Andrea Doria in the Battle of Ponza in August. That same year, the Ottoman expedition against Hormuz (led by Admiral Piri Reis and Seydi Ali Reis) was dispatched from the Egypt Eyalet against the Portuguese-Iranian alliance in the Persian Gulf; the main goal was securing the Hijaz from Portuguese raids, reestablishing Turkish-Sunni control of Indian Ocean trade, and conquering the Bahrain region to secure Ottoman Iraq from the Persians. Before arriving at Hormuz Island, the expedition sacked Portuguese Oman in August at the Capture of Muscat (1552), crushing the Al-Mirani Fort and occupying the southern Arabian coast from Aden to Basra, while blocking the Red Sea to Portugal. However, at the Siege of Hormuz in September, the expedition was defeated by the Portuguese; as a result, the Strait of Hormuz was not blocked. (This outcome allowed communication with Portuguese India to solicit reinforcements for revenge the next year.)
  Route of the Piri Reis expedition in 1552
- 1553: During this time, the struggle in the Mediterranean continued actively. The Ottoman fleet under the command of Sinan Pasha and Turgut Reis—together with a French fleet under the command of Antoine Escalin des Aimars— struck the coasts of Naples, Sicily, and Corsica; in August and September, they captured Corsica, which was under the control of the Genoese, an ally of the Kingdom of Spain. Nevertheless, the Kingdom of Spain realized that it could no longer hold Mahdia, which it had occupied in 1550. Emperor Charles V offered to turn the castle over to the Knights of Malta, but when his offer was rejected, he evacuated the castle. Then the Ottomans recaptured the castle. The Battle of the Bay of Velez took place in July of the same year, between Portuguese-Moroccan and Ottoman–Algerian forces at the Peñón de Vélez de la Gomera, and it ended in Portuguese defeat. Despite Morocco's alliance with Portugal and Spain (in response to the Ottoman expeditions to Morocco), the Ottomans tried to offer booty to the Saadi ruler as a token of friendship. They wanted to avoid possible Moroccan raids on Oran; in addition, they wanted to reconcile Saadians and Wattasids to assist against Iberian enclaves in North Africa, as well as support Mudéjar and Morisco renegades' attempts to restore Al-Andalus. However, the Moroccan-Algerian border issues were not solved, and so the Battle of Taza was later initiated. The Battle of the Strait of Hormuz (1553) took place that same year against the Portuguese Empire in Asia. In this battle, the Ottoman Indian Ocean fleet, led by Murat Reis the Elder, attempted to transfer 15 galleys from Basra to the Red Sea—needing to cross the Persian Gulf dominated by the Portuguese India Armadas from Ormus—to finish the Portuguese raids in the Gulf of Aden to Suez; however, the Ottomans lost that military engagement and were forced to return to Ottoman Iraq.
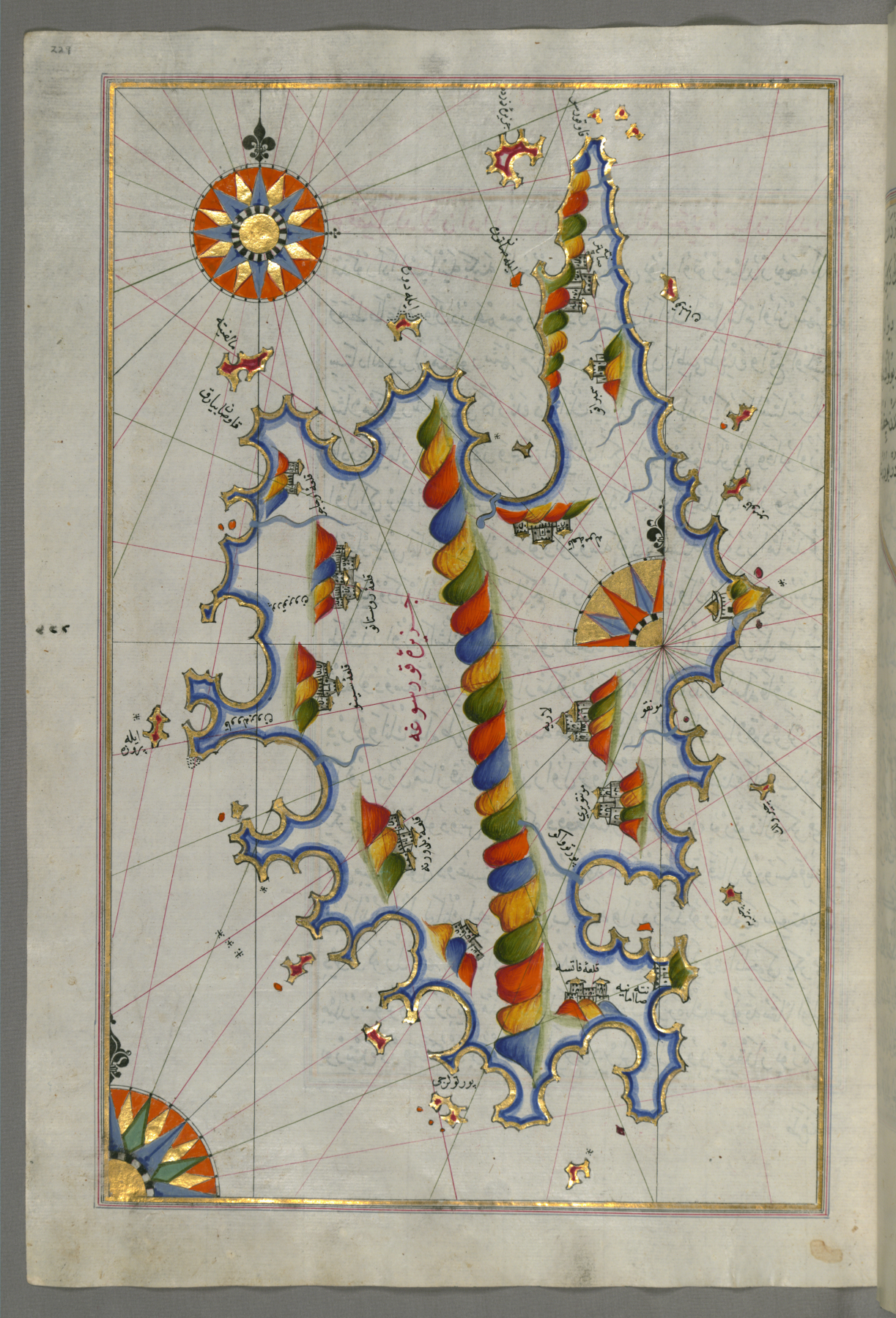
  Piri Reis map of Corsica, which helped to realize the Ottoman–French invasion of the island in 1553
- 1554: The Ottoman fleet took several actions: they plundered the coast of Pula, which was part of the Kingdom of Naples, Spain; they invaded Vieste; they bombarded the coast of Tuscany, which was part of the Republic of Florence; and they invaded Orbetello. However, the Ottoman fleet was unable to meet the French fleet and abandoned the planned joint operation on Corsica, returning because of the advancing season. On the Portuguese war front, the Battle of the Gulf of Oman took place, in which the Ottomans failed to expel the Portuguese from the Arabian Gulf or to conquer the Imamate of Oman; but the Ottomans finally succeeded in crossing the Strait of Hormuz and reaching Gujarat to help it against Portuguese India. The subsequent engagements were raids on Diu by Sefer Reis, which ended in a major victory for the Ottomans by looting profits of nearly 160,000 cruzados (Portuguese currency) and various heavily loaded Portuguese merchant ships.
  - On the other hand, Morocco was in a period of national fragmentation because of conflicts between Wattasids and Saadis. This fragmentation led to a Spanish–Ottoman proxy war there. The Wattasids, led by Ali Abu Hassun, after being rejected by the Portuguese Empire, sought help from the Ottomans starting in 1545. (They were too distant for a vassalage pact in which Morocco would be annexed to the Ottoman Empire.) Meanwhile, the Saadis led by Mohammed al-Shaykh were initially offended by the arrogant tone of the Sublime Porte (central government of the Ottoman Empire), which addressed Moroccan sultans as mere "Sheikhs of the Arabs", thereby disturbing previously good Saadian-Ottoman relations. Nevertheless, the Saadis later sought defensive aid from the Spaniards in response to Turkish interventionism (being too distant to invade Ottoman Algeria). In 1554, the Ottomans launched the Capture of Fez with the goal of conquering Morocco, which they briefly did. Another goal of the Ottomans was gaining access to the Atlantic Ocean by occupying the Moroccan port of Tangier, thereby avoiding the Iberian blockade of Turkish ships on the Strait of Gibraltar. This was a first step in larger plans to develop Turkish incursions into Spanish America and establish a Turkish colony with the proposed name of "Vilayet Antilia" on the Spanish Main (based on the Piri Reis map). However, Moroccan resistance prevented the Ottomans from executing this plan.
- 1555: The activities of the Ottoman Navy—under the command of Piyale Pasha and Turgut Reis—in the Western Mediterranean continued without slowing down. While the navy devastated the coasts of Calabria, Tuscany, Corsica, and Liguria, the Turkish-French raid on Piombino was fruitless. The Governor of Algiers, Salih Reis, captured Béjaïa, one of the few bases left by the Spanish in North Africa, on 28 September. This loss caused anger in Spain; the commander who surrendered the castle to the Ottomans, Alonso Peralta, was executed in Valladolid.
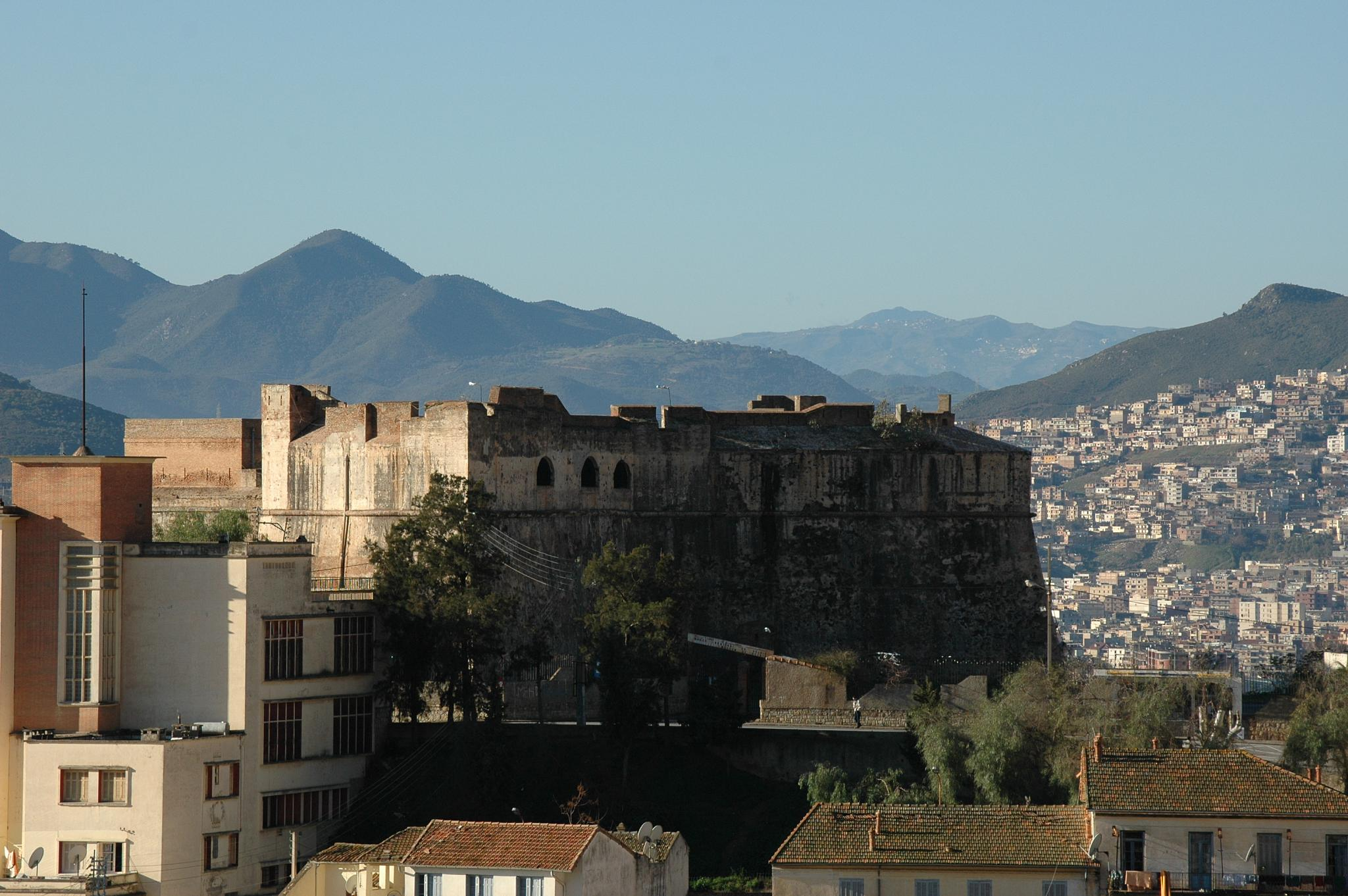
  Spanish Fort Barral in Béjaïa, Algeria
  - Meanwhile, the Holy Roman Empire also underwent a historical turning point after the First and Second Schmalkaldic Wars. The HRE's Imperial Diet convened in Augsburg to broker peace between the Catholics and Lutheran princes ( the Schmalkaldic League). When the Peace of Augsburg was signed on 25 September 1555, the Latin formula cuius regio, eius religio ("the religion of the ruler is the religion of his country") was adopted, granting each ruler the authority to determine the religion of his own territory. However, Charles V—who had suffered continuous military defeats against the Ottoman Empire; had failed to subjugate France; had lost Metz in 1554; and had failed to establish religious unity within his country—had collapsed psychologically and was prepared to abdicate, potentially dividing the HRE between the Spanish and German/Austrian branches. These shocking developments in the empire continued on 16 January 1556, when Charles V formally abdicated and retired to a monastery in Spain. Charles V's brother and the Archduke of Austria, Ferdinand, ascended to the empire's throne; Charles V's son, Felipe II (1556–1598), became King of Spain. From a global perspective, the Ottoman–Habsburg wars significantly influenced the consolidation of the Protestant Reformation despite opposition from the Holy Roman Emperor. This occurred because the Empire of Charles V did not have the freedom to focus on the German-Nordic religious conflict because of the Franco-Ottoman alliance threatening imperial interests in several wars: the Italian Wars, the Hungarian–Ottoman wars, and the Spanish–Ottoman War. As noted by Jack Goody, "the consolidation, expansion and legitimization of Lutheranism in Germany by 1555 should be attributed to Ottoman imperialism more than to any other single factor".
- 1557: An Ottoman fleet of 60 ships, under the command of Turgut Reis and Piyale Pasha, hit the coast of Apulia, landed troops on the coast of Calabria, and invaded Cariati. Then the fleet headed toward Tunisia and conquered Bizerte, which had been occupied by the Spanish Empire since 1534.
- The Hispano-Moroccan Expedition to Mostaganem in 1558
  1558: The Ottoman fleet, under the command of Turgut Reis and Piyale Pasha, carried out a larger-scale operation in the Western Mediterranean—invading Reggio in Calabria; plundering the Lipari Islands; and capturing Massa Lubrense, Cantone, and Sorrento on the Amalfi coast of the Kingdom of Naples. The fleet then bombarded Piombino on the Tuscan coast, headed south, and defeated a fleet of the Knights of Malta off the coast of Malta; then the fleet headed for the Balearic Islands and captured Ciutadella, the capital of the island of Minorca, after an eight-day siege (17 July). The Spanish response (allied with Moroccan troops in their own conflict with Ottoman Algeria) was the Expedition to Mostaganem (1558) in an attempt to conquer Algiers, but it ended in disastrous failure.
- 1559: The Peace of Cateau-Cambrésis ended the Italian Wars, consolidating Spanish hegemony in Europe and also temporarily dismantling the Franco-Ottoman alliance, because of France's withdrawal from the Mediterranean Sea and the beginning of the French Wars of Religion.

=== Unsuccessful peace efforts (1558–1559) ===
While this struggle was occurring in the Mediterranean, as a result of diplomatic negotiations between the Ottoman Empire and the Holy Roman Empire since 1557, a permanent armistice was signed between the Ottomans and the Germans on 31 January 1559. On 29 April 1558, Emperor Ferdinand sent four drafts of the Ahidname charter to the Ottoman side. Although the German ambassador Ogier Ghiselin de Busbecq appeared before Suleiman the Magnificent on 8 June, he did not receive a positive response to drafts of the Ahidname. However, it was agreed that negotiations would continue: because the Ottoman Empire had eliminated the Safavid Persian threat in the east through the Treaty of Amasya in 1555, the ongoing civil war of succession among the princes (after the assassination of Prince Mustafa in 1553) had turned Suleiman's attention to the struggle among his sons. The period between three events—Prince Bayezid's defeat by his brother Şehzade Selim in Konya in 1559, his subsequent refuge with the Safavids, and his strangulation by Ottoman executioners in Kazvin as a result of the Ottoman–Safavid reconciliation in 1561—occupied the Ottoman state mechanism considerably.

During the same period, the Spanish branch of the Habsburg Dynasty also sought peace with the Ottomans. In March 1558, both King Philip II of Spain and Pope Pius IV sent an emissary to talk with Persian ambassadors via Michel Cernovic; he was the chief dragoman (interpreter) of the Venetians and an agent of Ferdinand I of the HRE, as well as of Habsburg Spain, in Constantinople. However—along with the Flemish ambassador for the Kingdom of Germany, Ogier Ghislain de Busbecq—he was more concerned with negotiating the Ottoman border treaties in Transylvania and Hungary with the Vienna-based Habsburgs, rather than with finalizing an arrangement with Safavid Persia; this focus also led him to neglect negotiations about the Spanish–Ottoman conflict. In this context, the ambassadors sent to the Ottoman palace in November 1558 and June 1559 could not conclude an armistice, unlike Busbecq; the Ottoman–Spanish War, which had been active since 1515, entered its most difficult period in 1560. As a result, Spain developed an espionage network in the Ottoman court at Constantinople, providing information on Turkish naval activities and sabotaging its facilities. Spain had key people such as the Genoese Juan María Renzo, the Neapolitan Juan Agostino Gilli, the Venetian Aurelio Santa Croce, and the Genoese Adam de Franchi; these were supplemented by a network in Algiers led by the renegade Alí Bajá.

=== Total war (1560–1574): Djerba, Malta, Lepanto, and Tunis ===
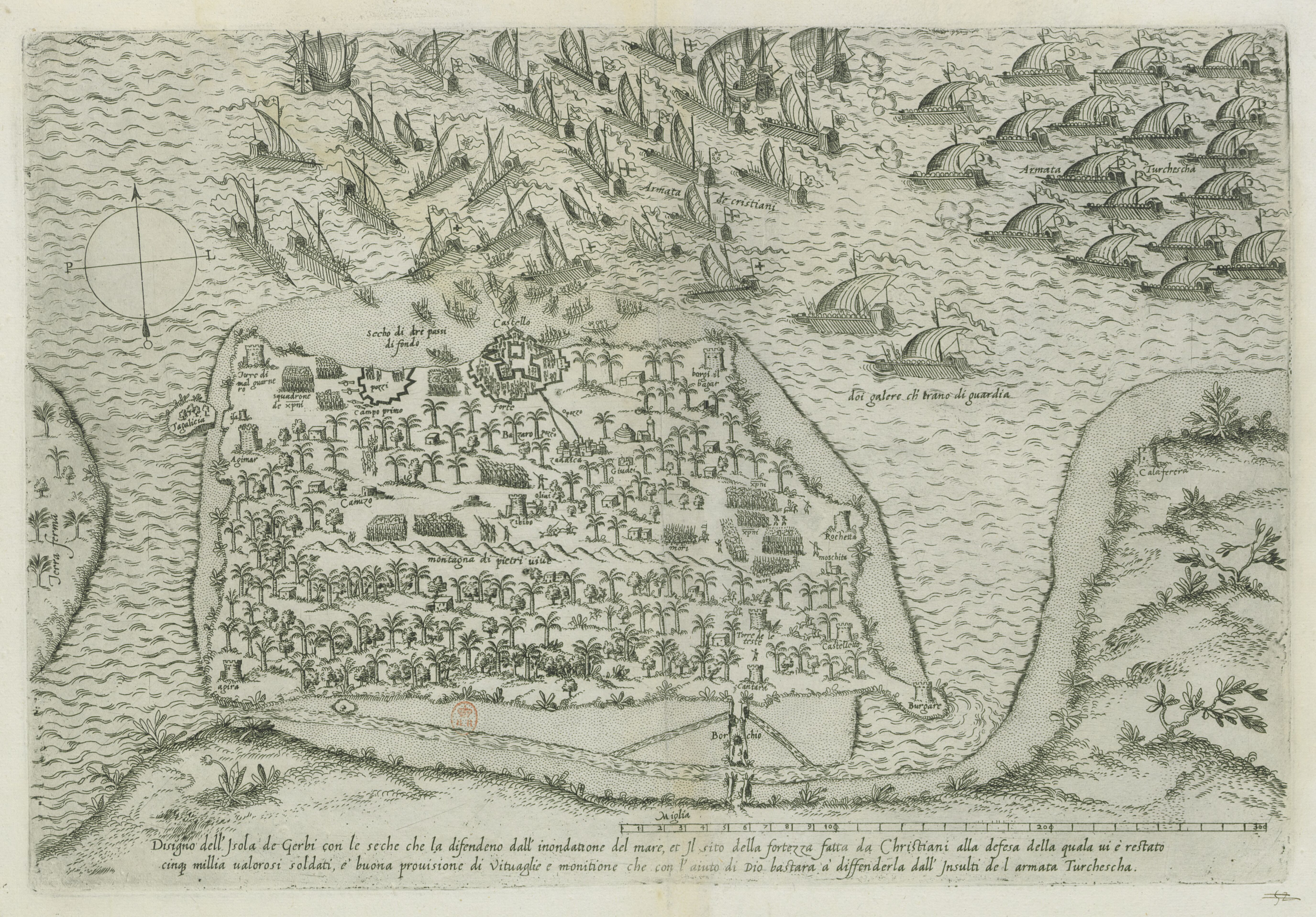
Battle of Djerba (1560)

The Ottoman Empire's relocation of the war to the Western Mediterranean from 1542 onwards, along with the devastating attacks of the Ottoman Navy on the lands of Spain and its dependencies each year, caused the Spanish Empire to turn its attention fully to the struggle there and to appeal to Pope Paul IV. In response to the Pope's call, the Holy Alliance armada of approximately 200 ships—consisting of warships from the Papacy, Genoa, Malta, Naples-Sicily and Savoy, in addition to Spain—targeted Tripoli; it was the base of Turgut Reis, who had caused the most destruction to Spanish lands between 1551 and 1559 (20 February 1560). In response to Reis, the armada, which headed for the island of Djerba for logistical reasons, captured it and built a fortress; however, the armada was forced into battle with the Ottoman fleet under the joint command of Piyale Pasha and Turgut Reis, which reached the island on 11 May. While the Ottoman Navy won a major victory in the Battle of Djerba, the armada lost half of its ships, and it suffered 9–18,000 deaths and 5,000 prisoners. Spanish Admiral D. Álvaro de Sande, who assumed command of the Djerba fortress after Genoese Admiral Giovanni Andrea Doria withdrew from the battlefield, was among these prisoners.

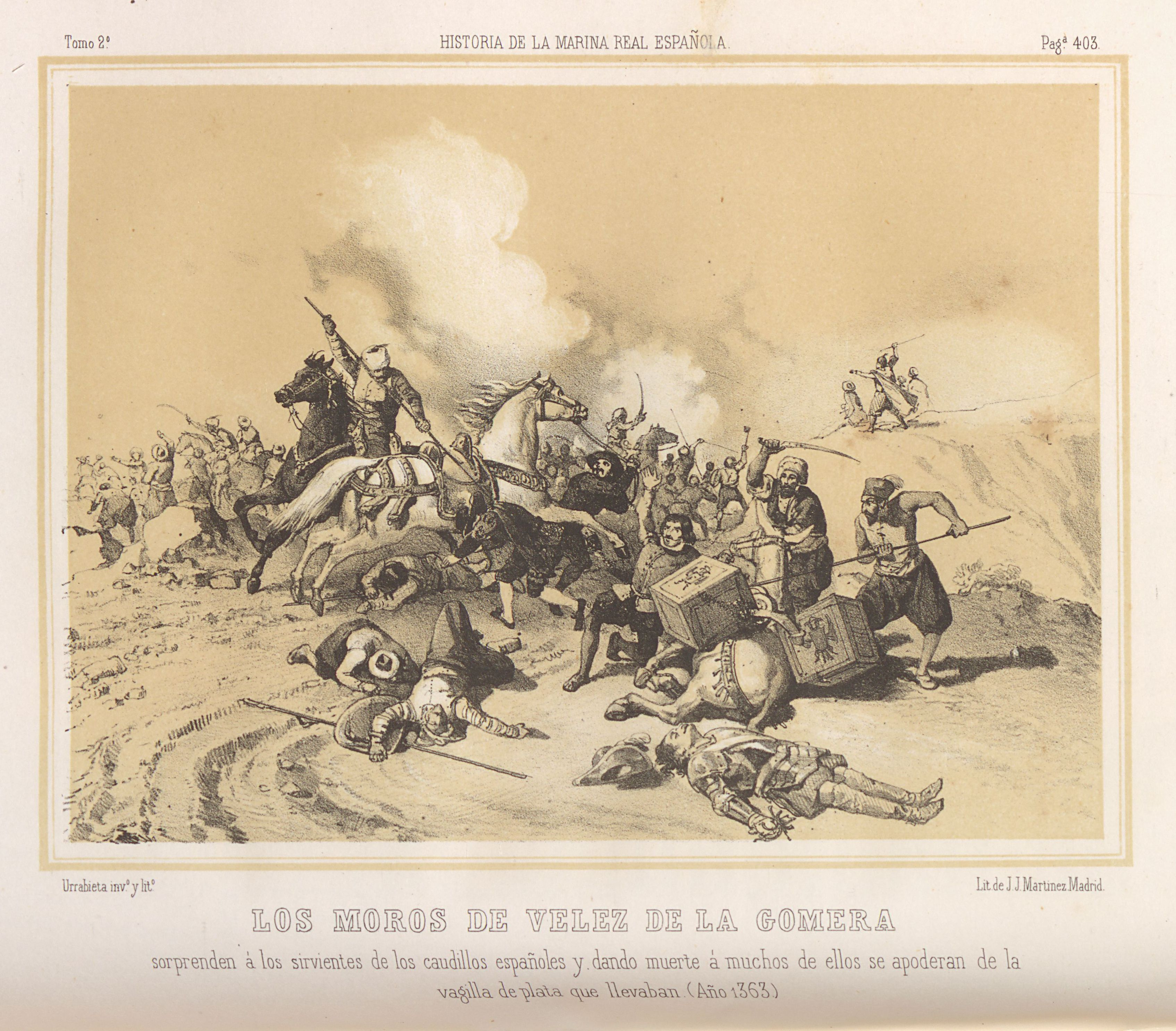
Defeat of the Spanish at Peñón de Vélez (1563)

While the victory at Djerba was, in a sense, the peak of the Ottoman Navy, for the next 10 years no power remained to oppose it in the Mediterranean. Spain, which had lost 600 skilled sailors and 2,400 harquebusiers (cavalry), required some time to recover. However, the Ottomans could not reinforce this superiority with additional gains. During this period, although Turgut Reis destroyed a Naples-Sicily fleet in the Battle of Lipari in 1561 and captured the remaining ships of the kingdom in the blockade of Naples, the Ottoman Navy—under the joint command of Piyale Pasha and Turgut Reis—could not take Oran, which it besieged (for the second time) in 1563. That same year, the Spanish fleet and troops under the command of Sancho Martínez de Leyva suffered a heavy defeat in front of the Ottoman base of Peñón de Vélez on the northern coast of Morocco, which they besieged. However, the following year, the Spanish fleet (aided by a Catholic coalition with Portuguese and Italian forces), commanded by García Álvarez de Toledo y Osorio, finally recaptured the base of Vélez. (These lands are still part of Spain.) The Great Siege of Mazagan (1562) also took place during this period—between Portuguese and Moroccan forces led by their prince Abdallah Mohammed, which ended in a crucial Portuguese victory.

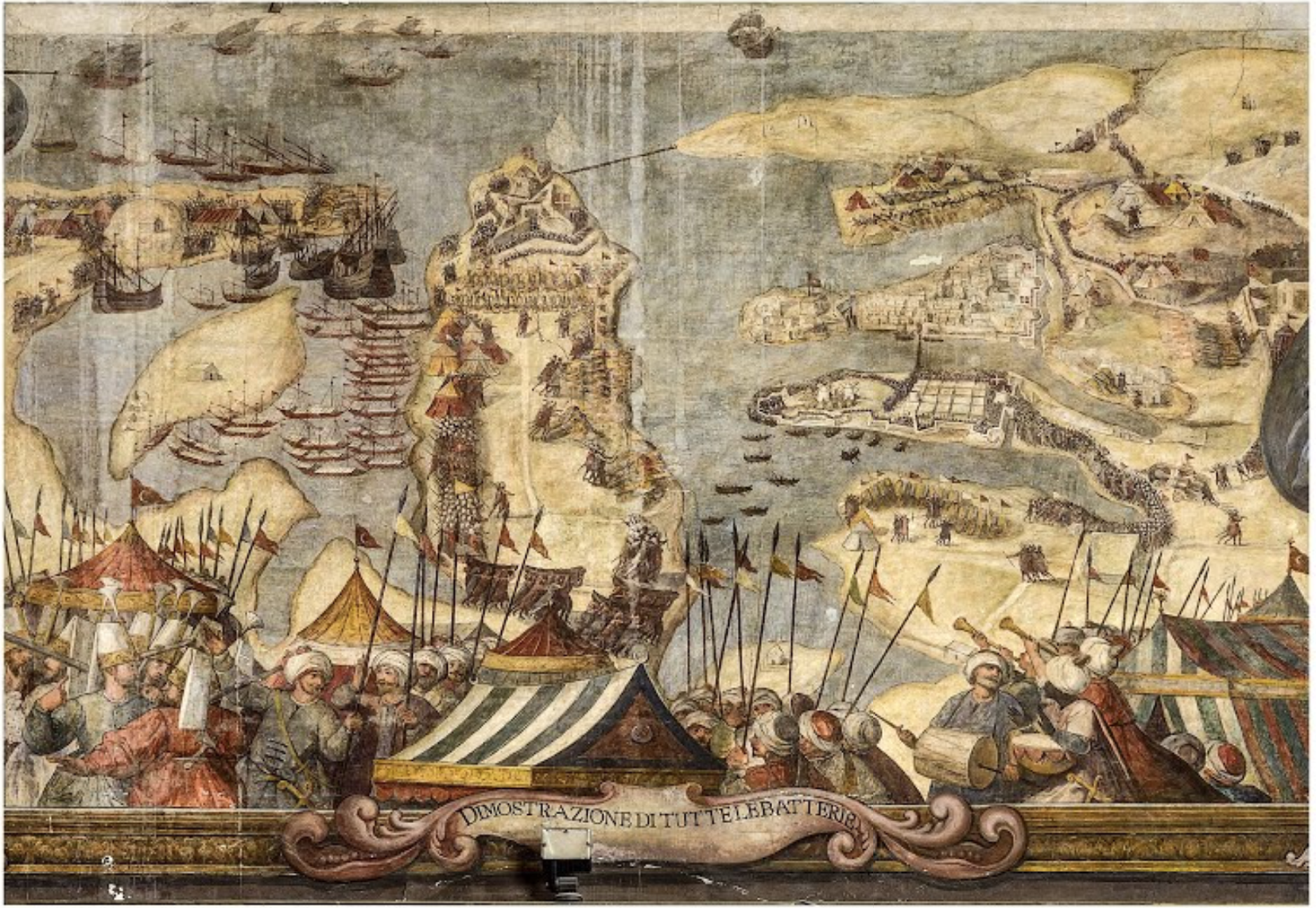
Great Siege of Malta (1565)

The year 1565 saw one of the largest operations by the Ottoman Navy. The navy, carrying a force of approximately 25,000 men, reached Malta on 18 May 1565, and it laid siege to the castles on the island defended by the Knights Hospitaller. The Ottoman forces, who had difficulty capturing the St. Elmo Castle, launched a heavy bombardment on 7 August of the island's main fortified positions, St. Michel and St. Angelo; however, they could not capture these positions with general attacks. The losses incurred, as well as the Ottoman Navy's need to return to Istanbul for the winter (because the season changed to autumn), led Lala Mustafa Pasha to evacuate the island. After a rescue party of 8,000 men under the command of Don García and Ascanio della Corgna, sent by the Kingdom of Spain, landed in Malta on 7 September, the Ottomans were routed and evacuated the island on 8 September. In this way, the Knights Hospitaller, an important ally of Spain, and the island of Malta, which protected the Kingdom's lands in southern Italy, were saved. Although the Ottoman forces suffered losses in Malta, the Ottoman Navy maintained its power. Indeed, while the Ottoman army was marching to Hungary in 1566 for the Siege of Szigetvar—the last campaign of Suleiman the Magnificent—the Ottoman Navy (under the command of Piyale Pasha) conquered Chios, which was ruled by the Genoese, an ally of Spain. Then, sailing to the Mediterranean, the navy struck the Pula coast of the Kingdom of Naples, also an ally of Spain. Later, in 1566, Philip II ordered his ambassador to Portugal, Alonso de Tovar, to undertake two tasks: preparing an embassy to Persia, and informing the king if the Persians intended to break the Peace of Amasya with the Ottomans after the death of Suleiman the Magnificent. (However, the mission never reached Persia.)

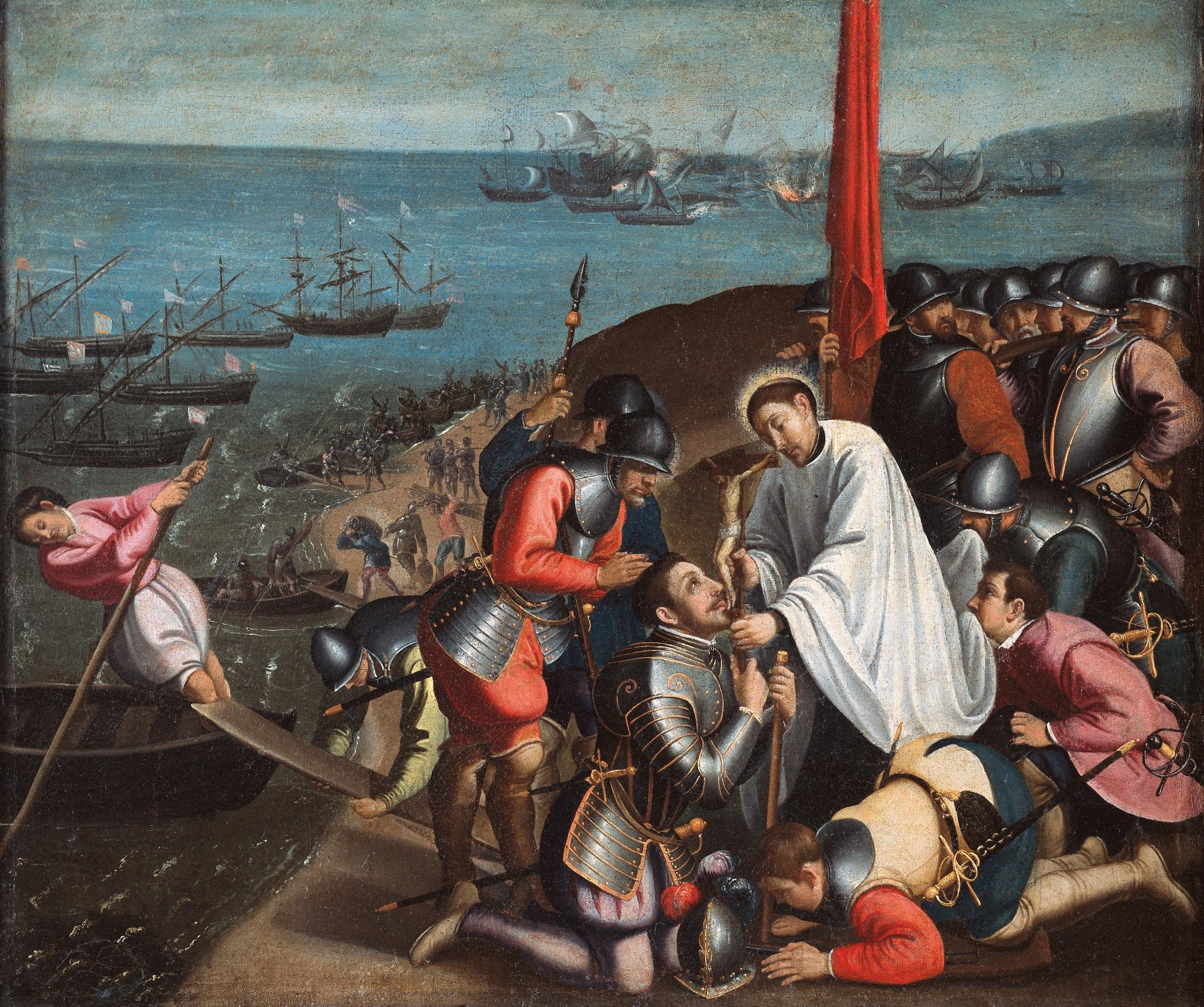
Portuguese troops in Malacca fighting the Acehnese and praying to Saint Francis Xavier, painting by André Reinoso

In addition, the Portuguese theater saw the Siege of Malacca (1568) in the Portuguese East Indies. This siege was instigated by the Ottoman expeditions to Aceh from 1564, which also supplied cannonneers and mercenaries from all the Turkish Empire to the Aceh-Kalinyamat Sultanate alliance, although the Portuguese were triumphant in that engagement (with the help of the Johor Sultanate). Nevertheless, the Ottoman–Acehnese alliance instigated further sieges to Malacca (as in 1570), and it supported the offers from the Muslim Indian Deccan sultanates—especially an embassy from Adil Shahi/Bijapur in the name of the Muslim alliance from the Battle of Talikota against the pro-Portuguese Vijayanagara Empire—with two goals. The first goal was developing an anti-Portuguese League of the Indies (along with the Kingdom of Sitawaka, the Gujarat Sultanate, and the Johor Sultanate) to expel the Catholic Church in India. The second goal was instigating a war front in the Indian Ocean to crush the Portuguese India Armadas from Goa to Malacca (distracting them to support Spaniards in the Mediterranean-Atlantic Ocean wars of the period).

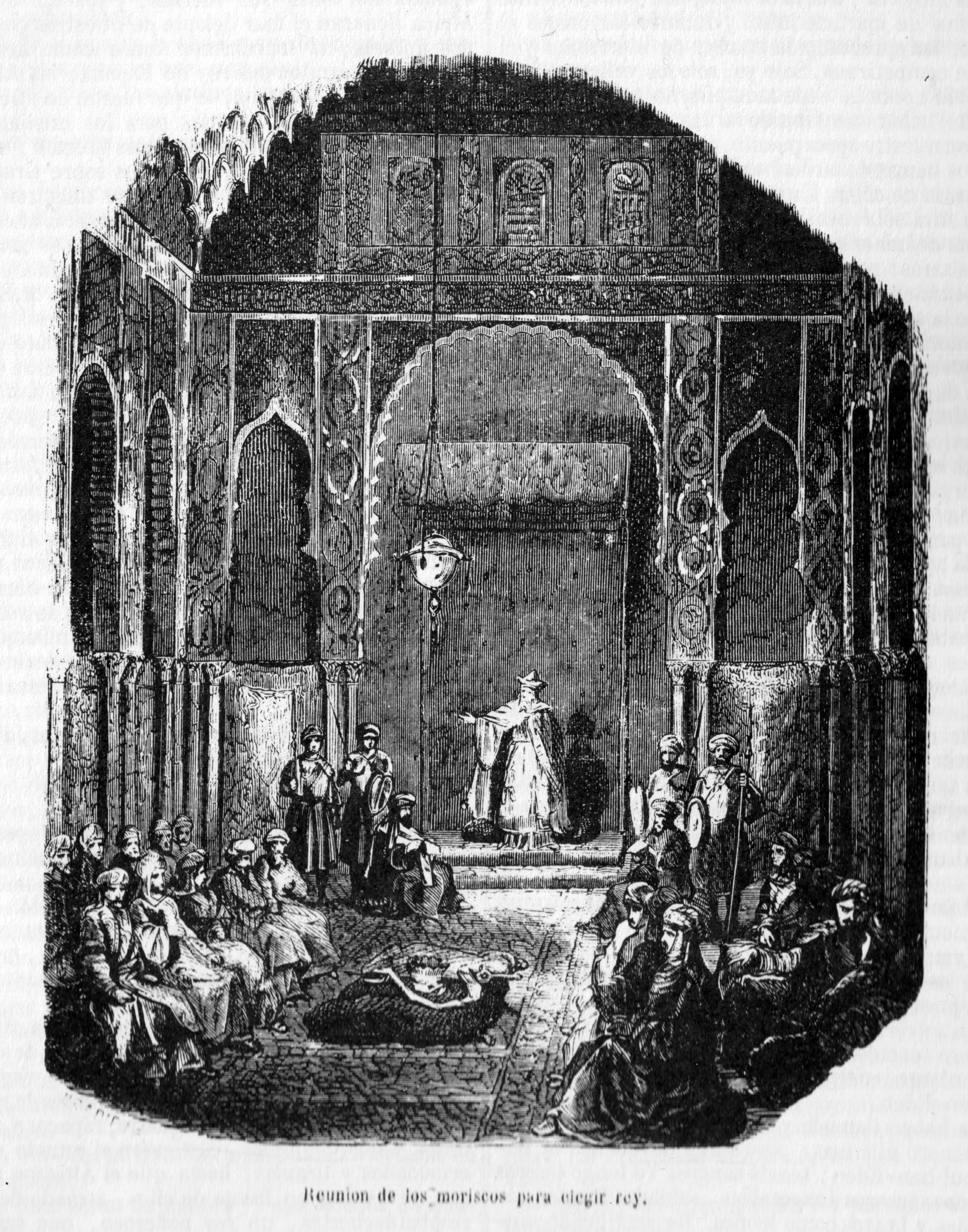
The acclamation of Aben Humeya as King of the Moriscos during the Alpujarra War. Ottomans tried to support them in an attempt to restore the Emirate of Granada

During this period of armed peace (between 1565 and 1571), the Kingdom of Spain was occupied with both the Granada Revolt and the Dutch revolt. At the start of the Dutch war of independence, Jan van Nassau and William of Orange were desperate for allies and inspired by the anti-Catholic Turco-Calvinist approach. They began sending envoys to the Ottoman court after the early stages of the rebellion in 1566; they received a positive response from the Sephardic and Ottoman adviser, Joseph Nasi, in a letter to Antwerp authorities claiming that "the forces of the Ottomans would soon hit Philip II's affairs so hard that he would not even have the time to think of Flanders". The Sultan Suleiman also offered troops at the time they requested. (However, the death of Suleiman the Magnificent briefly interrupted Netherlands–Turkey relations because of internal struggles, so no Ottoman material support arrived until 1574.)

Meanwhile, after Felipe II further tightened his assimilation policy with a decree in 1567, the Moriscos of Granada took advantage of the King's dealing with the rebellions launched by Protestants in Germany and Calvinists in the Netherlands. The Moriscos revolted in 1568 under the leadership of Aben Humeya; they requested the Ottoman Navy to organize an expedition assisting them in a letter sent to the Beylerbeyi of Algeria, Kılıç Ali Pasha, on 20 April 1568. Ottoman Sultan Selim II, to whom the Moriscos conveyed their requests for aid, responded in a letter on 16 April 1569: he was closely following the uprising, and he was doing his best to provide the necessary aid promptly, but it was impossible to send the Ottoman Navy to the region immediately, because the navy was preparing for the Cyprus expedition. However, Selim II ordered Kılıç Ali Pasha to support the rebels. Kılıç Ali Pasha's attempt to send a fleet to Almería in 1569 carrying soldiers, provisions, and weapons failed due to a storm; nevertheless, he sent 400-500 soldiers, along with provisions and weapons, in a new attempt during 1570. King Philip II acted during the winter of 1570–71 against the dangers of increasing this aid and spreading the uprising, and he suppressed the uprising violently. In response, taking advantage of Spain's preoccupation with the uprising, Kılıç Ali Pasha captured Tunis—then controlled by the Hafsids under Spanish protection—in an expedition at the end of 1569.

Alpujarra War in the Kingdom of Granada (Crown of Castile)

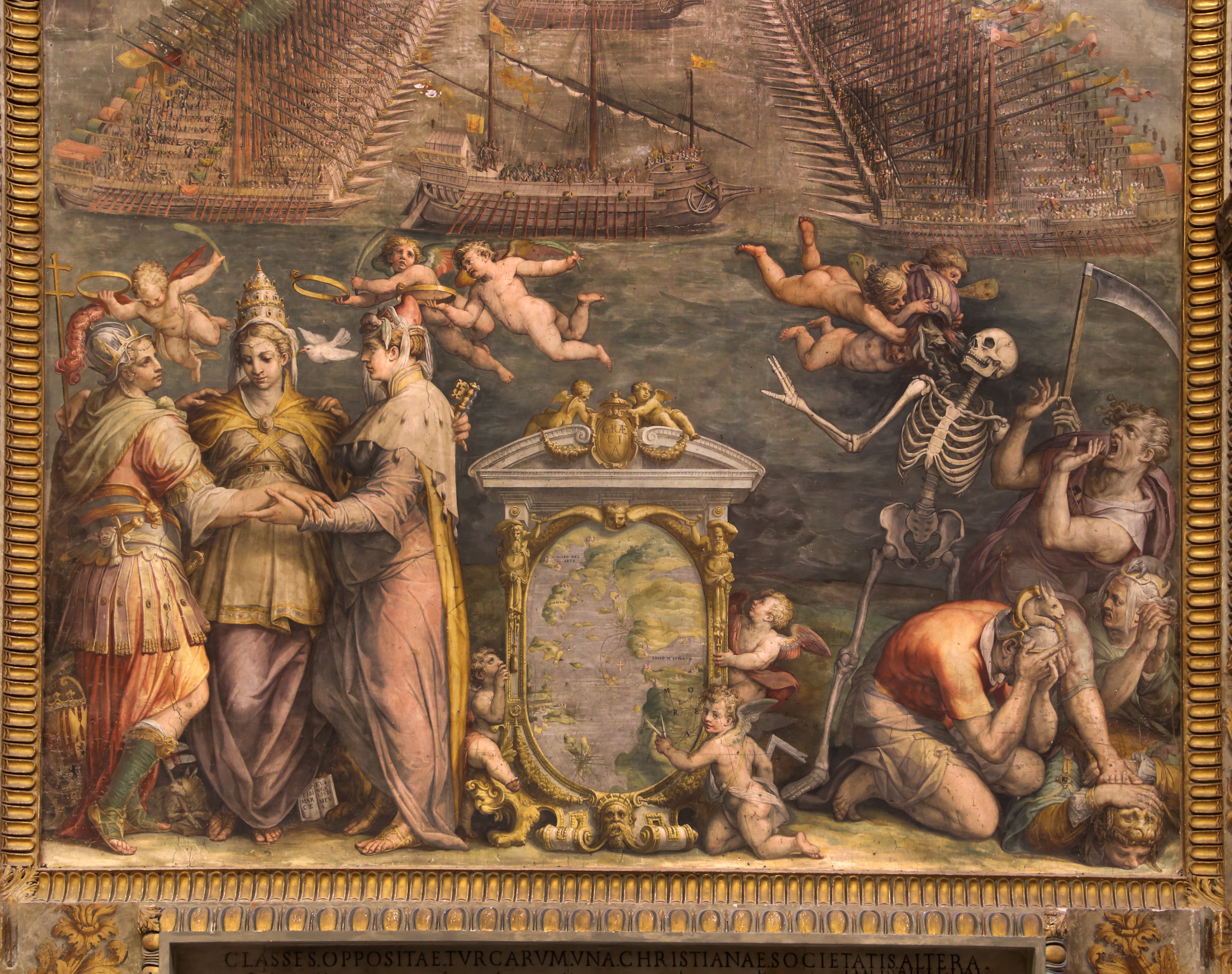
Fleet of the Holy League in front of Messina in 1572-1573 (painting by Giorgio Vasari and assistants)

After suppressing the Granada Revolt, the Kingdom of Spain refocused on its direct struggle with the Ottoman Empire. During the Ottoman attacks on Cyprus in the early years of the 1570–1573 Ottoman–Venetian War, the Holy Alliance—established between the Kingdom of Spain, its dependencies, and Venice on 25 May 1571—could not prevent the Ottomans from capturing Famagusta and completing the conquest of Cyprus. However, the kingdom inflicted a major defeat on the Ottoman Navy at the Battle of Lepanto on 7 October 1571. (Spain contributed 49 galleys to the Allied navy in the battle.) Subsequently, the Spanish–Venetian coalition developed contacts with Greek dissidents, planning a possible liberation of the Peloponnese. The Ottomans, who had completely rebuilt their navy, set out for the Mediterranean under the command of Kılıç Ali Pasha in the summer of 1572; however, they were pushed back by the Allied navy in the Skirmish at Cerigo Channel, to which the Spanish contributed 55 galleys.

During this period, another attempt was made toward rapprochement with the Persians: the Holy League prepared an embassy in 1572 to inform Shah Tahmasp I about the defeat of the Ottoman army at the Battle of Lepanto, and to propose renewing the Habsburg–Persian alliance to fight against the Turks. In addition, Íñigo López de Mendoza, viceroy of the Kingdom of Naples, sent gifts to the Persian monarch on behalf of the King of Spain (via an Armenian messenger named John the Baptist), with an offer of friendship. The Shah responded positively; he sent John the Baptist and a Persian emissary with his reply, containing many gifts for Philip II. However, after Tahmasp I fell seriously ill in 1574 and died two years later, these plans could not be realized when civil war broke out in Persia. (The Turks took advantage of this war by invading Persia in 1578.)

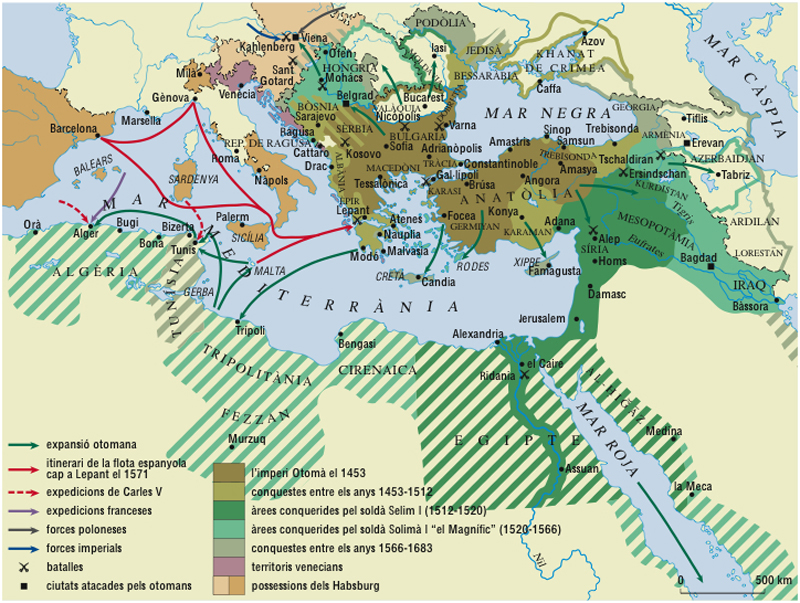
Ottoman wars in Europe at the peak of the Spanish–Ottoman War

That year, the Kingdom of Spain made the first offer of peace, but it brought no results. By contrast, peace negotiations between the Ottomans and Venice were concluded positively; the Holy Alliance was effectively ended as a result of an agreement signed between the parties on 7 March 1573. Following Venice's withdrawal from the war, the Ottoman Empire and the Spanish Empire were alone in their struggle. During the summer of 1573, the Ottoman Navy under the command of Piyale Pasha and Kapudan Pasha Kılıç Ali Pasha targeted the Apulia lands of the Kingdom of Naples, which was affiliated with Spain; at the same time, the Spanish Navy under the command of Juan de Austria took advantage of this attack and targeted the city of Tunis (which had been annexed to the Ottoman lands in 1569), capturing it on 10 October 1573.

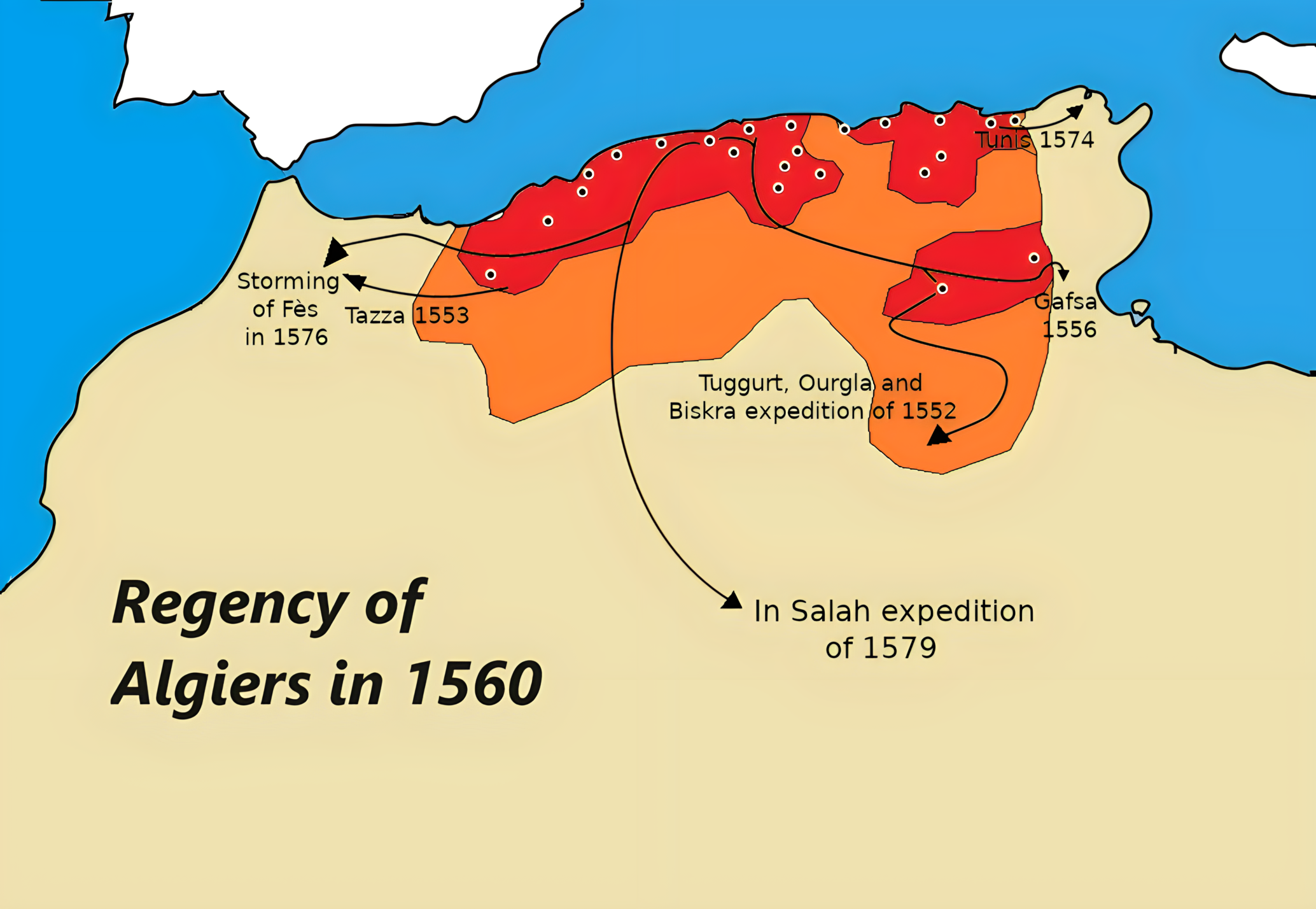
Algerian military campaigns during the period

As a result, the main objective of the Ottoman Navy in the following campaign season (1574) was to liberate Tunis from occupation. The navy was under the command of Kılıç Ali Pasha, and the Ottoman forces were under the command of Ciğalazade Yusuf Sinan Pasha. As a result of successful military operations between 12 July and 13 September 1574, the navy and the armed forces annexed Tunisia to the Ottoman lands (until French occupation in 1881). This was the final confrontation between the Crown of Castile forces and the Turks for a long time.

Map of the Dutch Revolt at the end of Spanish–Ottoman total warfare

Another goal of the Ottoman campaigns of 1574 was to help Dutch rebelsers in the Spanish Netherlands, as well as to consolidate a Turco-Calvinist alliance by reducing Spanish-Catholic pressure over the Dutch Reformed Church by opening another war front for Habsburg Spain. This ultimately led to two outcomes. The first outcome was the 1575 Spanish-Dutch Breda peace conference, held partly because Philip II wanted to focus on the Ottoman War, rather than also struggling with the Dutch war. The second outcome was the establishment of an Ottoman Consulate in Antwerp (De Griekse Natie) shortly afterward, in order to improve Netherlands–Turkey relations in the context of the Ottoman–Habsburg wars.

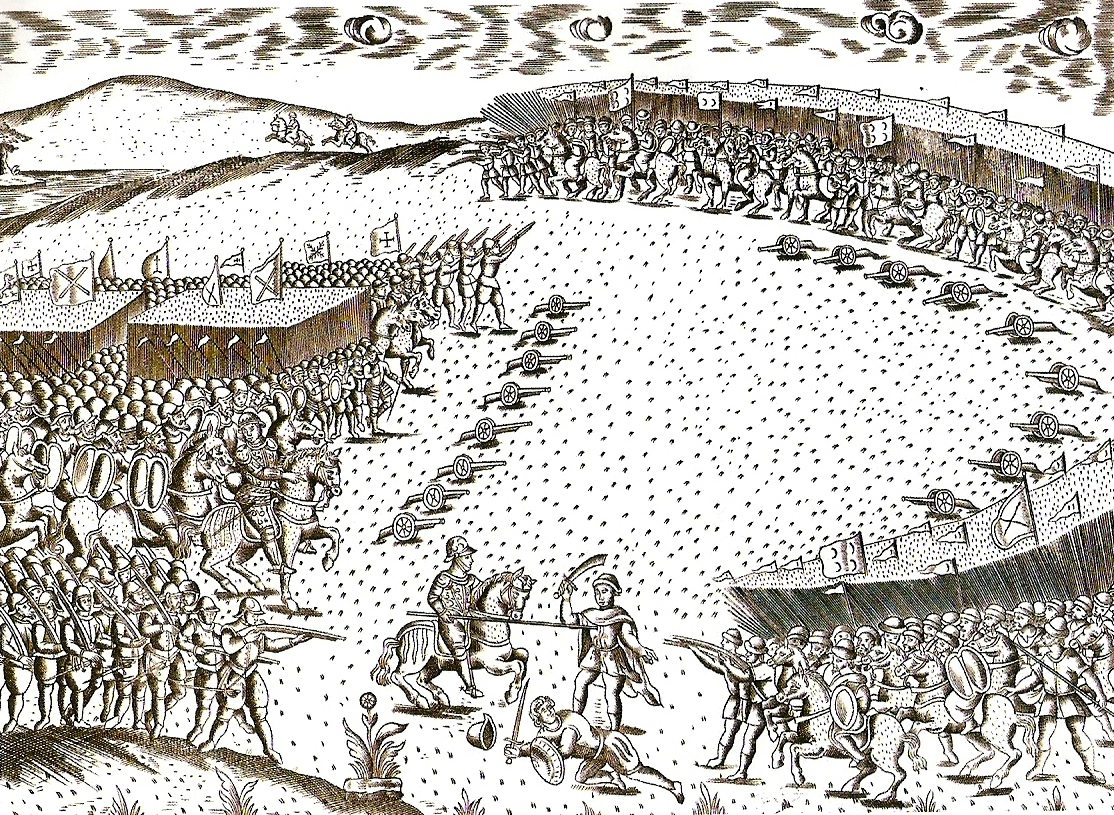
Battle of Alcácer Quibir, the last proxy war of Spanish–Ottoman total warfare in the Mediterranean

Philip II of Spain—in the name of prudence due to economic problems—ceased to develop further major military operations against the Ottomans; nevertheless, he still supported military operations by allied rulers to have indirect conflict with the Turks. One example was the project of Sebastian I of Portugal to help Abu Abdallah Mohammed II Saadi (who first sought help from Spain, but did not receive it because of the more pacific Spanish foreign policy at the time) in reconquering Saadi Morocco against the Ottoman–Algerian Capture of Fez (1576). This led in 1578 to the Battle of Alcácer Quibir. For this battle, Habsburg Spain financed and allowed Portuguese and Moroccans to recruit auxiliary forces in the king's territory (and convinced the HRE to do so); the kingdom feared the threat of an Ottoman suzerainty so close to the Iberian Peninsula. (This not only risked the security of the empire's metropolises, but also potentially threatened Iberian routes to the Atlantic Ocean and the Americas.) However, the battle ended in a Pyrrhic victory for the coalition of Ottomans, Algerians, and Moroccans—this coalition was supported by Morisco contingents and Sephardic capital in fear of the Spanish Inquisition—against the European coalition.

== Changing priorities and the search for peace ==
After the conquest of Tunisia by the Ottomans, the Ottoman Empire and the Spanish Empire realized that their borders in the Mediterranean had effectively stabilized. Although the Ottomans continued to gain territory in Tunisia, the expedition, which required the equipping of a large Ottoman fleet and the transportation of a significant landing force over a long distance, caused significant expense. (The income from Tunisia was much less than this expense.) In addition, there was internal unrest in Persia following the death of Shah Tahmasb I of Iran on 25 May 1576. This unrest began to draw the Ottomans' attention to their eastern front. In this context, the Ottomans—who had made peace with Venice in 1573—established a supportive administration in the north by placing the Voivode of Transylvania, Stephen Báthory, on the throne of the Polish–Lithuanian Commonwealth in 1575. (This placement was perceived as establishing a vassal government in the north.) After Rudolf II ascended to the throne on 25 December 1576, they renewed the 1568 treaty with the Holy Roman Empire, so the Ottomans were in a position to close other fronts in the west.

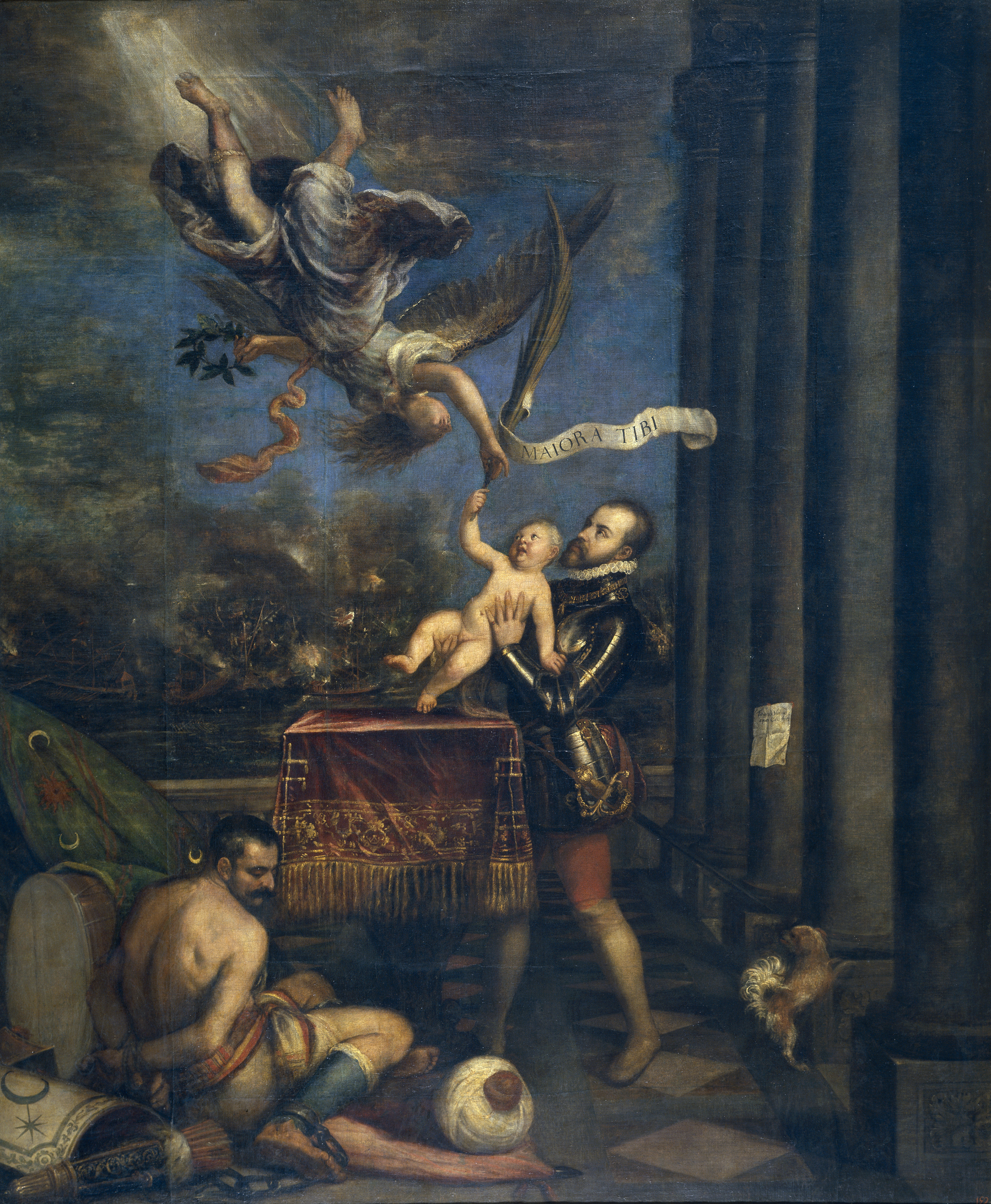
Philip II offering Don Fernando to Victory, portrait of the King of Spain Felipe II after the Battle of Lepanto

The problems in the Spanish Empire were much greater. Along with the large sums spent on the struggle against the Ottoman Empire in the Mediterranean, the Dutch Revolt that started in 1568 began to strain the budget of King Felipe II, who pursued an economic policy focused on excessive debt; in November 1575, the king declared the treasury bankrupt. Following these developments, the king secretly offered a ceasefire to the Ottomans.

An ambassador named Martín de Acuña ensured that a five-year armistice agreement was signed between the Ottoman Empire and the Kingdom of Naples (a vassal of the Crown of Aragon) in February 1577. The same ambassador also offered mediation to the Crown of Castile; when King Philip II deemed it appropriate, the ambassador began making efforts at the Ottoman palace that same year. A draft text emerged on 18 March 1577.

In this way, an unofficial ceasefire was established between the parties. The parties did not allow their navies to attack each other's lands, and Philip II did not send the troops that he had withdrawn from the Spanish Netherlands against the Ottomans. As a result of these negotiations, the Spanish ambassadors Giovanni Margliani and Bruti—who delivered the letter from the grand vizier Sokollu Mehmed Pasha to Philip II—ensured that the draft ceasefire agreement was signed on 18 March 1578 (7 February 1578 according to some sources).

Iberian enclaves in North Africa (Oran, Melilla, Ceuta, Asilah, Tangier, El Jadida, etc.) in 1580 at the end of Ottoman–Spanish Mediterranean warfare

The agreement was written to include the states clustered around the two powers' spheres of influence at each end of the Mediterranean. Within this framework were two spheres of influence. In the Ottoman sphere were the Kingdom of France (which was allied with the Ottomans) and the Holy Roman Empire, the Kingdom of Poland-Lithuania, the Republic of Venice, and the Sultanate of Morocco (all seen as tributary states by the Ottoman dynasty). In the Spanish Empire sphere were the Papal States, the Kingdom of Portugal, the Knights Hospitaller of Malta, the Republic of Genoa, the Republic of Lucca, the Duchy of Savoy, the Grand Duchy of Tuscany, the Duchy of Ferrara, the Duchy of Mantua, the Duchy of Parma, the Duchy of Urbino, and the Principality of Piombino. The Portuguese Empire and the Spanish Reinos de Indias (Spanish America and East Indies) were included in the armistice only in the context of the Atlantic Ocean (Aethiopian Sea) and the Mediterranean war zone, while the Red Sea and the Indo-Pacific were excluded from the truce. Ottomans and Iberians initially agreed not to damage their colonial interests in Persia (the Portuguese Kingdom of Hormuz and Ottoman Mesopotamia) as a condition of the truce in the Mediterranean. Following this first agreement, which foresaw a ceasefire between the parties for a period of three years (1577–1580), a one-year ceasefire agreement was signed between 21 March 1580 and January 1581; then a three-year ceasefire agreement was signed on 4 February 1581. The 1581 agreement was renewed in 1584, 1587, and 1591. Some Ottoman–Spanish conflicts of minor impact—except the Long Turkish War, the Bohemian Revolt, and the Great Turkish War (although Spain was a minor party)—took place between the total war of 1515-1575 and the peace treaty of 1782. These conflicts included the 3rd Duke of Osuna corsair war during the 1620s, the Ottoman–Venetian War (1714–1718), and the Spanish–Algerian War (1775–1785), among others. Spanish–Ottoman hostilities resumed in 1594 because of the support of Philip II for the Holy League (1594), though without reaching the magnitude of previous years.

== Continuation of war overseas ==
Iberian Union overseas domains. In the East Indies (from the Cape of Good Hope to Southeast Asia), the Ottoman–Spanish War continued despite the truce in the Mediterranean Sea.

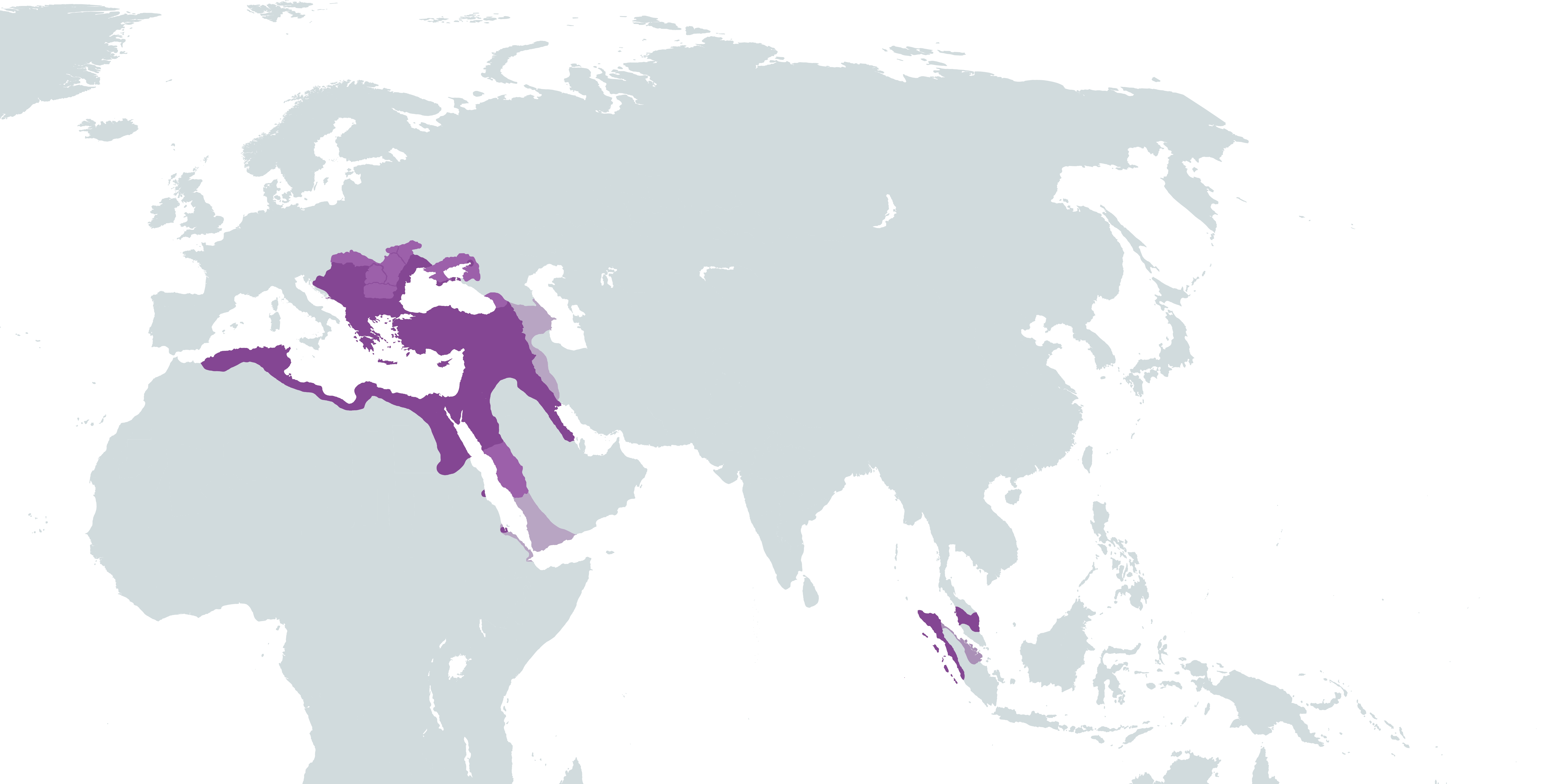
Ottoman Empire and its overseas vassal state, Aceh Sultanate, which continued the war in the Indo-Pacific region

The Spanish–Ottoman truce did not include the overseas possessions of either empire. After the War of the Portuguese Succession and the consolidation of the Iberian Union, the Portuguese Empire was directly involved in the global conflict between Habsburg Spain and the Ottoman Caliphate. This conflict spread to the Indian Ocean through Portuguese India and Portuguese Indonesia, and to the Pacific Ocean through the Spanish Philippines.

=== East Indies theater ===
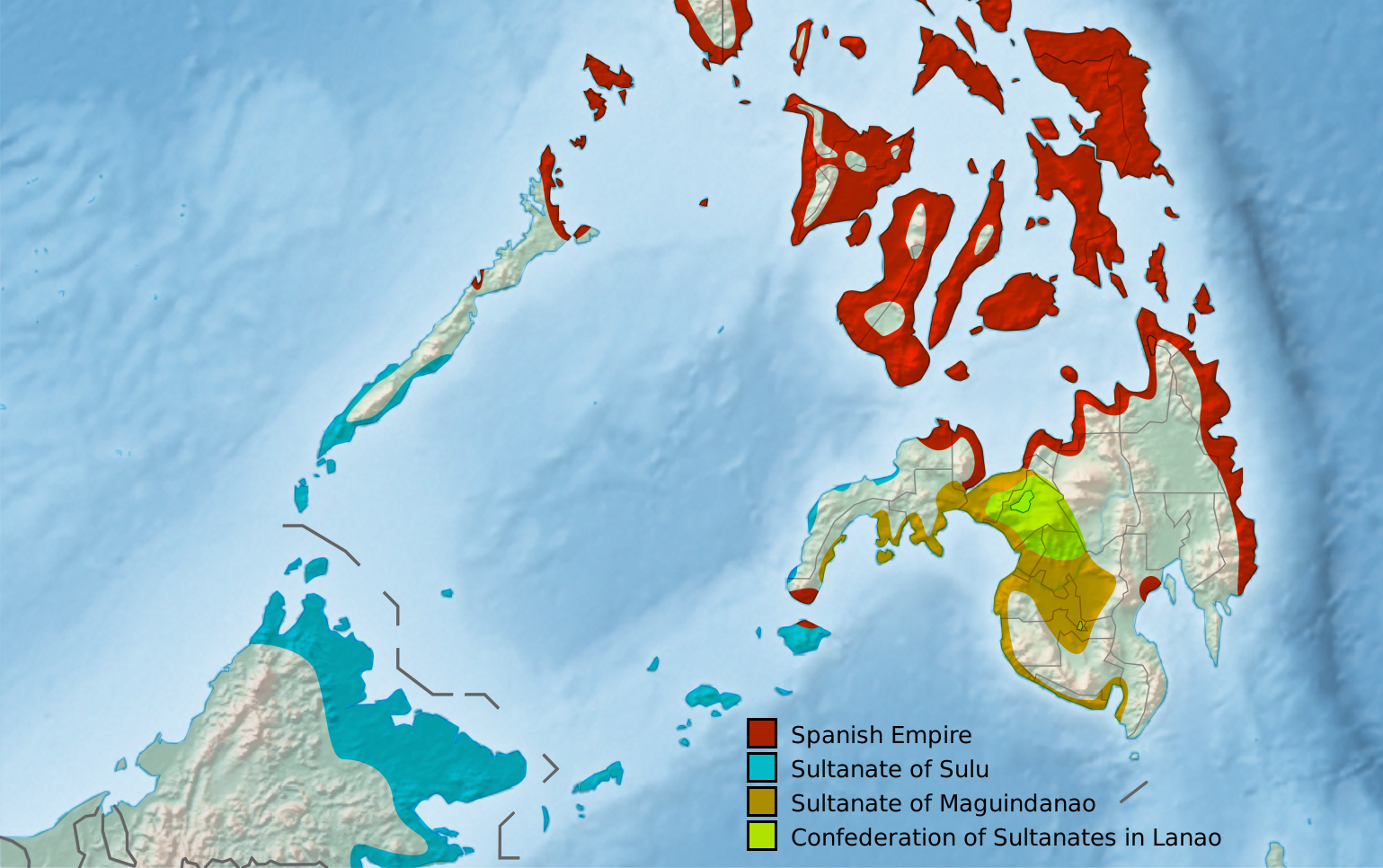
Moro Sultanates in the southern Philippines (Sulu, Maguindanao, and Lanao) which had support from Brunei, Ternate, the Dutch East Indies, Aceh, and the Ottomans

In Southeast Asia, Spanish rule had been consolidated in the archipelago of the Philippines (named after Philip II). This involved developing a sphere of influence over adjacent islands (including Borneo; the Moluccas [the fortress of Tidore]; forts on the island of Formosa; and annexes in the already oceanic Palau, the Mariana Islands, Caroline Islands, and Ralicratac); founding the Captaincy General of the Philippines as the center of the Spanish East Indies, in order to protect Catholic and Iberian interests in Asia and Oceania; seeking to develop China-Spain relations for commercial benefits; and primarily evangelizing to Catholicism to local pagan populations and those of several nearby Muslim sultanates in the Malay Archipelago. This then caused the Moro Conflict with local Muslims in the Philippines, who begged for aid from the Ottoman Empire. This conflict, along with the development of the Portuguese Empire in the Indonesian archipelago (such as Portuguese Malacca), attracted the attention of the Turkish Caliphate. The caliphate had already sent the Ottoman Expedition to Aceh during the 1560s to help the Sultanate of Aceh (formally vassalized to the Ottoman Empire) and, through the sultanate, nearby Muslim states in the Indo-Pacific region—such as Malacca, Johor, Patani, Gujarat, Ahmednagar, Bijapur, Jolo, Maguindanao, Tidore, Ternate, and the Bruneian Empire—that were potentially hostile to the Portuguese and Spanish Empires. This brought the Habsburg–Ottoman wars to Iberian Union colonial territories in the East Indies and threatened their dominance of the spice trade.

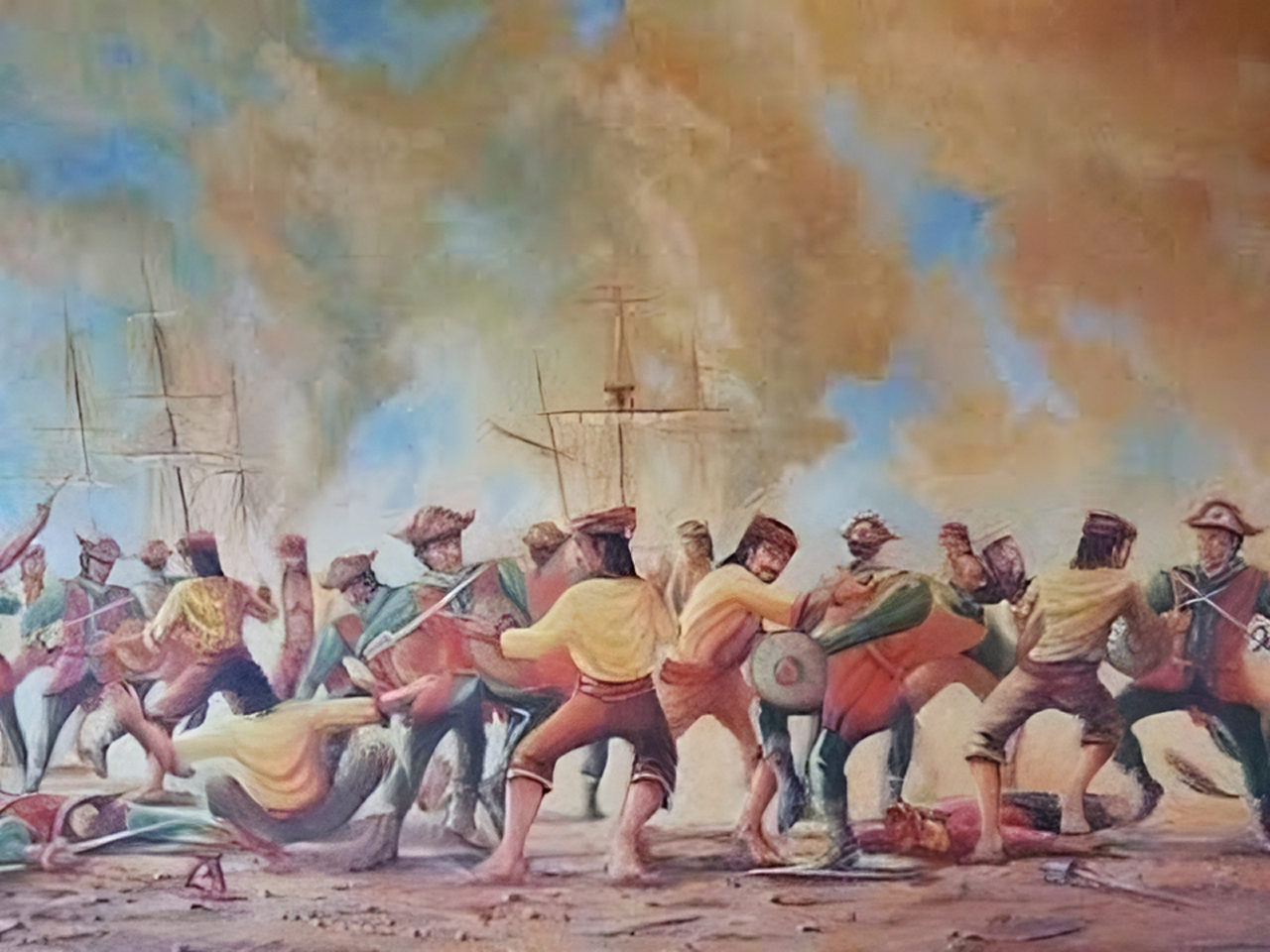
Bruneians (backed by Ottomans) fighting against a Spanish invasion

There were a series of naval skirmishes starting in 1565 and increasingly hostile relations with the Spaniards, because of Bruneian claims over former territories in Luzon (such as Maynila) and their alliance with the Moro people. In 1578, the Spaniards from Jolo—who had recently conquered the Sultanate of Sulu)—declared war over the Sultanate of Brunei, thereby starting the Castilian War. The Ottomans and the Muslim Lascars sent an expeditionary force to assist the Bruneians; this force included Turks, Egyptians, Berbers, Swahilis, Somalis, Arabs, Persians, Muslim Indians, Malays, Indonesians, and Moriscos (Andalusian Arabs. In reaction to the arrival of Ottoman soldiers to support Brunei and the Moros, the Spanish authorities recruited troops from New Spain (mostly Tlaxcaltecas) and Peru (mostly Quechuas), which increased into the 1630s.

The Bruneian-Spanish war ended in a stalemate, in which the Spaniards occupied Brunei and installed Pengiran Seri Lela as Sultan of Brunei and Pengiran Seri Ratna as Bendahara (head of the Malay nobility). However, because of an epidemic of cholera and dysentery, the Spaniards were forced to withdraw; Pengiran Bendahara Sakam Ibni Sultan Abdul Kahar was restored, but the Bruneians never recovered status as a regional great power.

Persians and Arabs and Egyptians and Turks brought [Muhammad's] veneration and evil sect here, and even Moors from Tunis and Granada came here, sometimes in the armadas of Campson [Kait Bey], former Sultan of Cairo and King of Egypt... Thus it seems to me that these Moros of the Philippine Islands [are] mainly those who, as had been said, come from Egypt and Arabia and Mecca, and are their relatives, disciples and members, and every year they say that Turks come to Sumatra and Borneo, and to Ternate, where there are now some of those defeated in the famous battle which Señor Don Juan de Austria won.

— Melchor Davalos

=== Red Sea – Indian Ocean theater ===
Portuguese presence in Asia (specifically on the Red Sea and the Gulf of Aden)
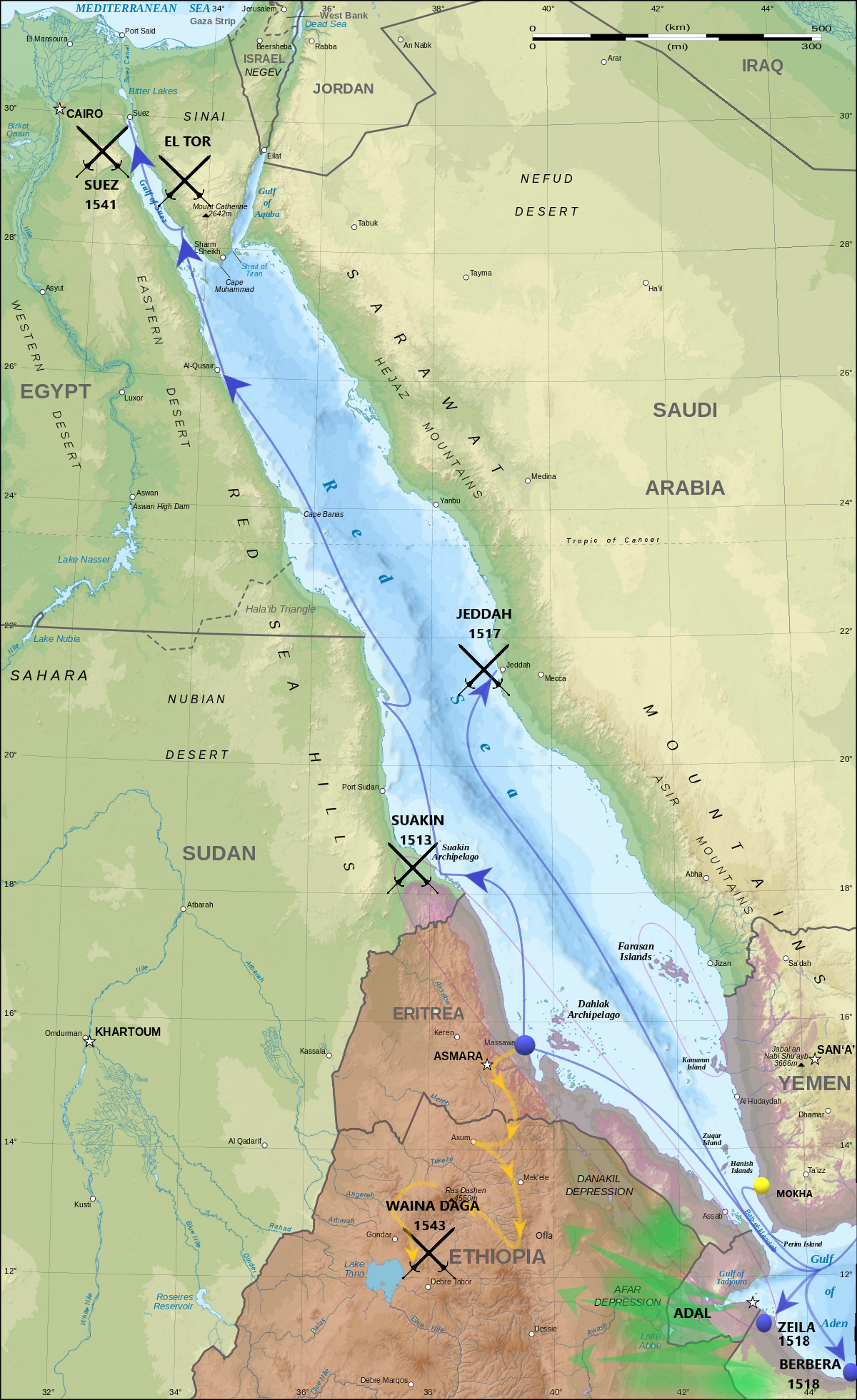
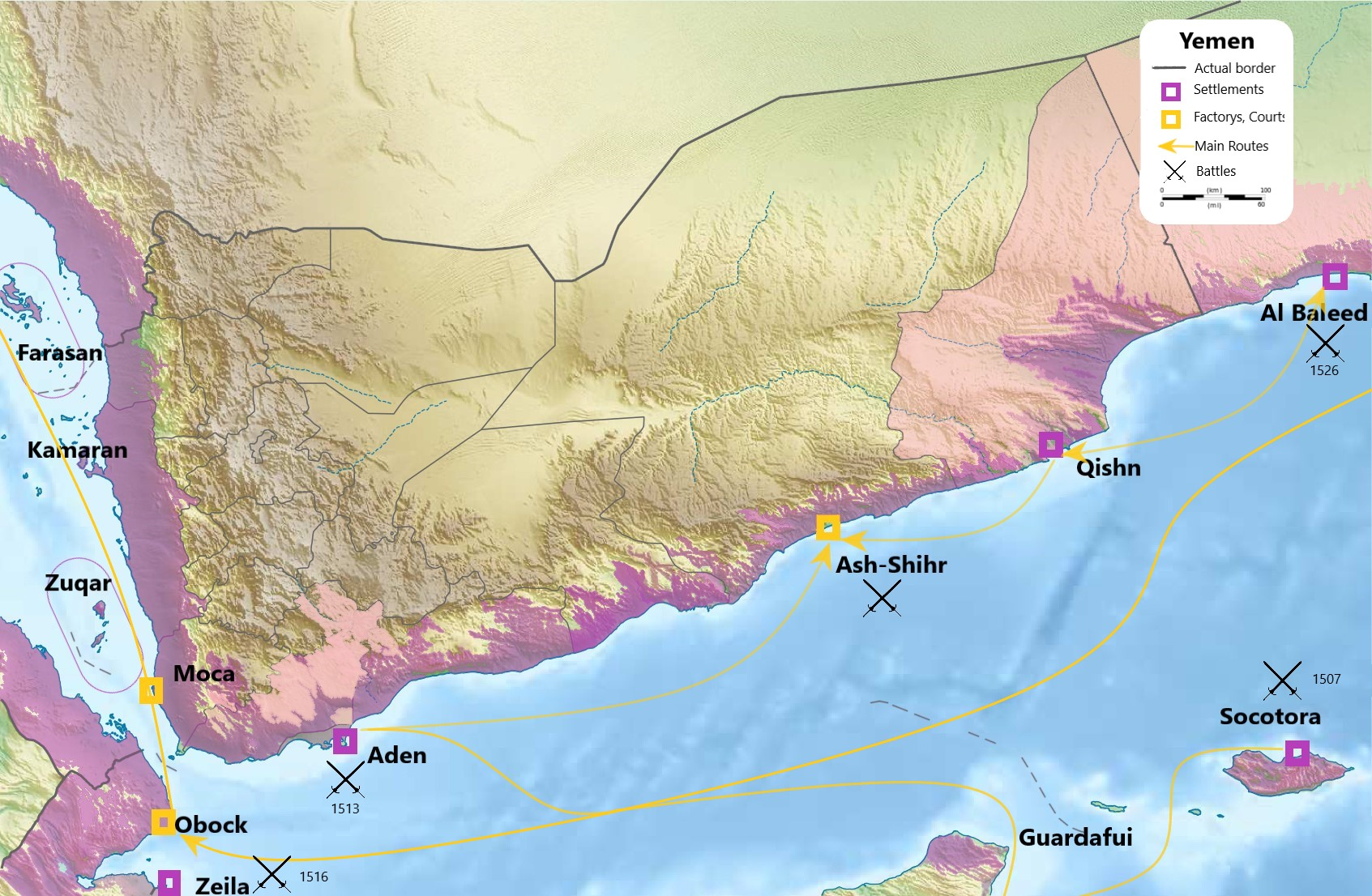

The first military engagement in this theater was a Spanish military expedition against Ottoman Egypt, in response to the Capture of Muscat (1581). The expedition conducted a series of raids in the Red Sea by occupying one of the castles of Yemen and Aden, previously destroyed by Hadım Suleiman Pasha in an Ottoman–Portuguese conflict in 1538. (This castle was located on a strategic island 160 miles from Aden Castle.) The expedition then reinforced the island, while starting to build ships by founding a shipyard. The expedition's main objectives were obstructing the trade route from India to the port of Jeddah (blocking Egyptian commerce along the way), as well as seeking potential allies by taking advantage of Yemeni–Ottoman conflicts. Consequently, the governor of Ottoman Yemen, Hasan Pasha—commissioned in 1580 by the grand vizier of the Ottoman Empire, Koca Sinan Pasha, to continue his anti-Iberian military policy—reacted with a major raid against the Spaniards in October 1586. In this raid, the Ottomans captured four Spanish galleys with many goods as spoils, which were sent to the Sublime Porte in tribute.

Simultaneously, a new Ottoman–Portuguese conflict in East Africa began as a result of the arrest of a Spanish spy in 1583 by Hassan Pasha. He used this arrest as an excuse to pressure Sultan Murad III for an increase in defenses on the Arabian coastal plain, in order to protect the Muslim Indian Ocean trade. In response, two galleots were sent from Suez to Mokha (Yemen), which were then delivered to the Ottoman corsair Mir Ali Beg for raiding Portuguese colonies on the Swahili coast. There were two main goals. The first goal was to block Iberians from crossing the Gulf of Aden by creating a new naval base for the Ottoman Navy in the Horn of Africa for conducting raids against Spaniards and Portuguese. The second goal was to contact the local Muslim population (mostly Somali and Swahili people who were hostile to the Portuguese) about their future vassalization (especially the Ajuran Sultanate) in order to conquer the Horn of Africa and expel local Christians (Iberians and Ethiopians).

Portuguese presence in Southeast Africa
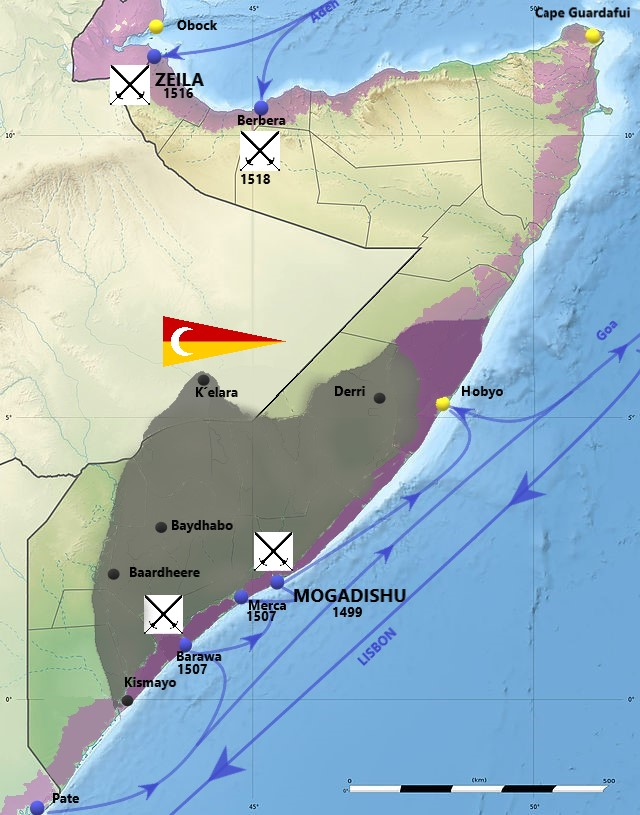
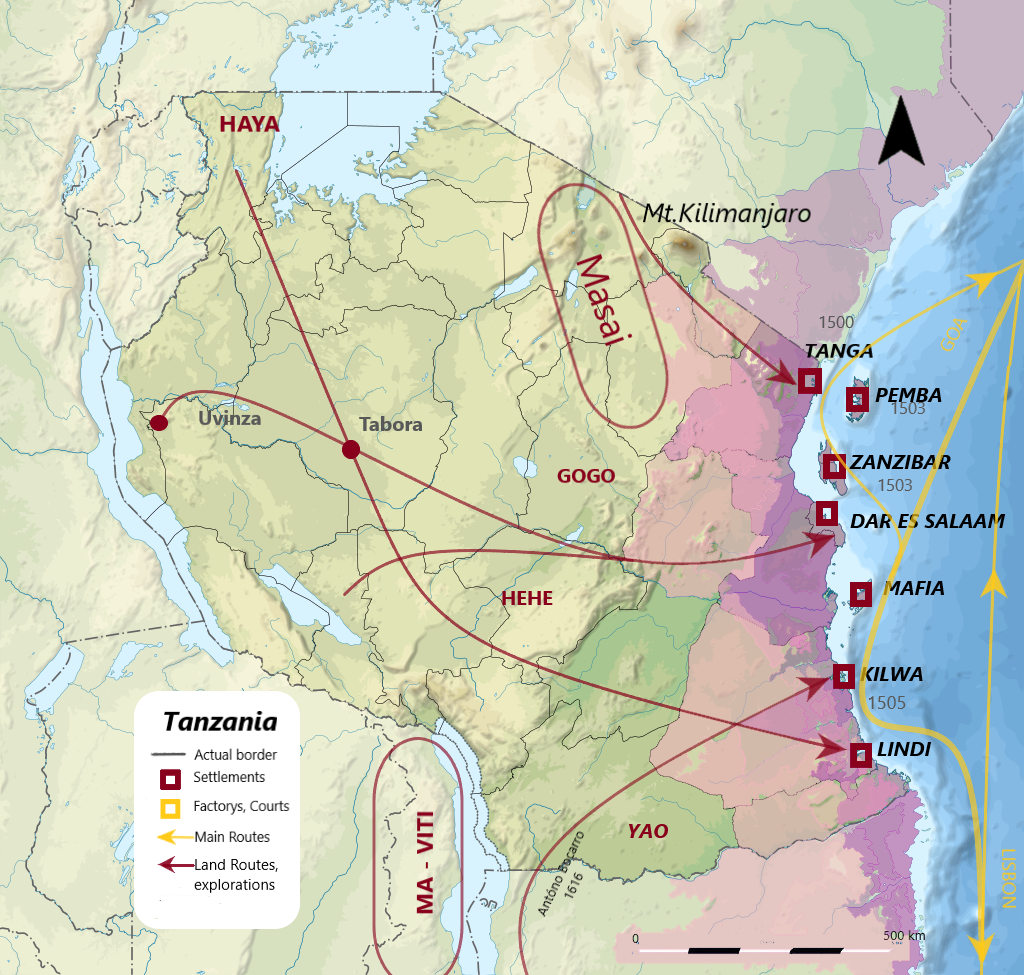

The ideal excuse for Turkish intervention was the appearance of an envoy from Ajuran Sultanate vassals (allies of Arabs and Swahili merchants) to the Ottoman corsair Mir Ali Bey. The envoy invited the corsair to intervene in the region and to develop a Somali-Turkish joint expedition against Portuguese Mozambique. After the Ottomans arrived at Mogadishu (Somalia) in 1586, the local population formally submitted to the Sultan of Sultans and enthusiastically helped the Turks by contributing resources and men to the Ottoman expedition. Similar support was provided by many coastal territories (such as Barawa, Pate Island, Pemba Island, and Kilwa Kisiwani) until becoming established at Lamu (Kenya). Meanwhile, the Portuguese, led by Ruy Lopes Salgado, withdrew and hid on Malindi, while a ship from Portuguese India commanded by Roque de Brito Falcão was captured and plundered by the corsairs. The Turks returned with 24 ships, a treasure of 150,000 gold cruzados (Portuguese currency), and 60 Portuguese captives. Despite a lack of preparation by the Portuguese Navy—worried by increased contact between Somali sailors and Ottoman corsairs—that caused those initial defeats, the Portuguese responded by sending a large fleet of 26 vessels commanded by Ruy Gonçalves da Câmara. The goal was to block the Red Sea, but the Portuguese failed to catch the Turkish corsairs. Because of economic problems, they departed for Portuguese Oman. These results discouraged Philip I of Portugal from further aggressive strategies, who then pleaded for prudence from the Viceroy of Goa, D. Duarte de Menezes—advising him to be less bellicose with the Ottomans in what he considered to be a minor theater of war for the Iberian Empire.

Since in these parts [i.e. Europe] there are many affairs deserving of attention, it will from now on be necessary for you to preserve the gains that have already been made rather than seek out new ventures. Keep in mind that offensive wars have many disadvantages, as has been demonstrated by the armada which you sent under Ruy Gonsalves da Câmara to the Red Sea which, far from resulting in any of the successes that had been hoped for, served only to provoke the Turks at great and unprofitable expense and with much discredit to the state ...

— Philip II of Spain

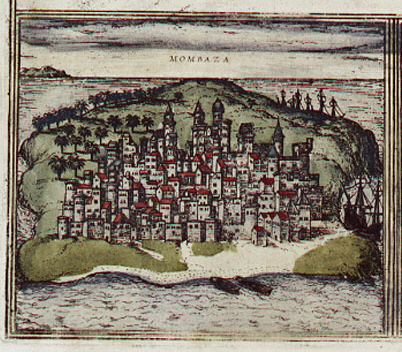
16th century depiction of Mombasa (Kenya), a key city during the Ottoman–Portuguese conflicts (1586–1589)

However, Duarte de Menezes was dissatisfied with the status quo. In January 1587, he ordered another large fleet to expel the Ottomans and restore Portuguese suzerainty. This fleet was composed of 2 galleons, 3 galleys, 13 light galleys, and 650 soldiers under the command of Martim Afonso de Melo. He subjugated Faza and Mombasa, and then he arrived at Malindi (still loyal to the Portuguese) to restore Colonial pacts in the Zanzibar Channel and improve diplomatic relations between the Portuguese and the locals. Then he returned to Goa via Socotra and Ormus, after failing to capture Mir Ali Beg. Subsequently, the Ottoman project to seize the Portuguese sphere of influence over modern Somalia, Kenya and Tanzania began to collapse. The Turks were defeated approximately four times during 1586, in their attempts failing to conquer Pate, Mombasa, and other cities. Another challenge was that Mir Ali Beg started to extract a heavy tribute from cities still under his control (such as Mogadishu) and attempted to sack cities loyal to the Portuguese (such as Malindi, which was bombarded by a Portuguese captain of the East African coast, Mateus Mendes de Vasconcelos). This caused him to alienate his former allies at a critical moment, so that a network of spies and informants within the Red Sea was developed by the Portuguese to anticipate Ottoman movements.

Finally, in 1589, the governor of Portuguese India, Manuel de Sousa Coutinho, sent an armada of 2 galleons, 5 galleys, 6 half-galleys, and 6 light galleys with 900 Portuguese soldiers, commanded by his brother Tomé de Sousa Coutinho. This armada was joined by the troops of Mateus de Vasconcelos at Malindi (adding a half-galley and two light galleys) in February. Then they clashed definitively with Mir Ali Beg on 5–7 March 1589 at the Battle of Mombasa (1589). With the help of the 'cannibalistic Zimba Tribe', the armada crushed Mir Ali Beg's small fort by the shore, sacking three Turkish galleys with 30 guns, and capturing Mir Ali Beg, while evacuating Mombasa inhabitants from the cannibalistic tribe's incursion. Later, the Portuguese managed to retake most of the lost cities in Southeast Africa and began punishing their leaders; however, Mogadishu seized independence, and the Ottomans remained a major economic partner of the Ajuran Sultanate.

Another late engagement between the Portuguese and the Ottomans was the Capture of Mombasa (1631–32). In this engagement, the Turks sent minor aid to the Sultanate of Mombasa led by Yusuf ibn al-Hasan, in which the Portuguese were briefly expelled from the region of modern Kenya because of piracy acts.

== Proxy wars after 1578 truce ==
Although the signed armistice was renewed several times, it could not be converted into a formal peace treaty. Therefore the state of war between the two parties continued—especially in the Spanish Philippines and Portuguese India against the Aceh Sultanate, an Ottoman vassal in modern Indonesia—until the signing of a definitive Treaty of Peace, Friendship and Commerce (the so-called Treaty of Constantinople) in 1782. Nevertheless, each empire conspired diplomatically against the other and prepared for a potential renewal of total war. In this regard, the espionage network developed by Philip II of Spain in Constantinople was relevant.

=== Ottoman–Spanish conflicts in the European wars of religion ===
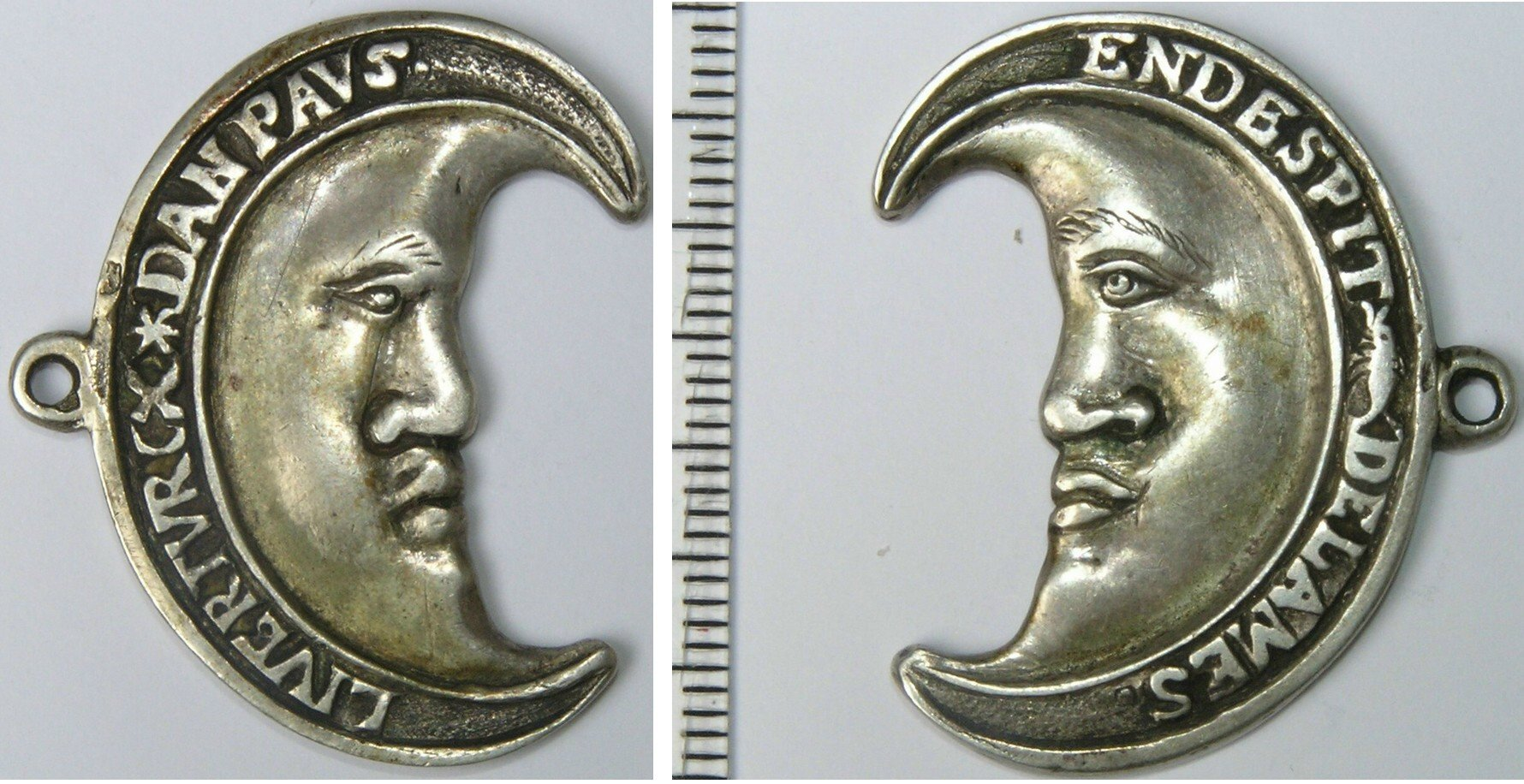
Coins bearing the inscription Liever Turks dan Paaps ("Better the Turks than the Pope"), minted in 1570 during the Dutch Revolt

In 1574, Selim II of the Ottoman Empire accepted requests for aid against Spain from a Franco-Dutch embassy, represented by the Huguenot François de Noailles in the name of Charles IX of France and William of Orange from the Netherlands. So Selim II developed an espionage network among Calvinists to put them in contact with the rebellious Moriscos of Spain and the Corsairs of Algiers. This development led to a tacit pirate alliance between Ottoman Barbary corsairs and the Dutch Sea Beggars (already allied with the English Sea Dogs and French corsairs) against the Spanish Navy (supported by the Dunkirkers and the Stratioti privateers), thereby linking Mediterranean Sea and North Sea corsair warfare.

In addition, Murad III of the Ottoman Empire strengthened Turkey–United Kingdom relations after the start of the Anglo-Spanish War (1585–1604). He responded positively to proposals by Elizabeth I of England to develop an Islamic-Protestant coalition with the Dutch Empire, French Huguenots, Moriscos, and Saadi Morocco against Philip II of Spain (perceived as the most powerful king of Christendom, and so the most important defender of "Catholic Idolatrism"). This coalition led to Anglo-Turkish piracy against the Iberian Union, Spanish Italy, the Catholic League (French), Venice, the Papal States, and Habsburg Croatia. This Anglo-Dutch approach to Maghreb Muslims, the Turco-Calvinist conspiracy, reached its peak in the early 17th century, combining with the Eighty Years' War and then the Thirty Years' War, as well as the Saadi Sultanate's civil war in Morocco and the Portuguese Restoration War. Another rapprochement included Venice and Henry IV of France (leader of the Huguenots in the French Wars of Religion) against the Iberian Union (resenting the Habsburg supremacy in Italy and the Portuguese in Indian Ocean trade)—thus an informal Venetian–Ottoman alliance through Bourbon France. This alliance was consolidated when the Venetians sabotaged Pope Clement VIII's plans to develop a new Holy League in 1594 (in the context of the Long Turkish War), while also approaching the 1596 Greenwich coalition (France, England, and the Netherlands) that supported Turkish piracy against the Spanish Empire until the Twelve Years' Truce; they were trying to impede a Spanish naval presence in the Eastern Mediterranean under the Venetian sphere of influence and to dismish Spanish influence in the Italian states. By the late 16th century, the navies of France, England and the Netherlands dominated Mediterranean commerce and became the main threat to Habsburg Spain; this situation led the Spanish to give a higher priority to the Low Countries than to the Ottomans.

=== Spanish – Eastern Catholic intrigues against Ottoman rule ===
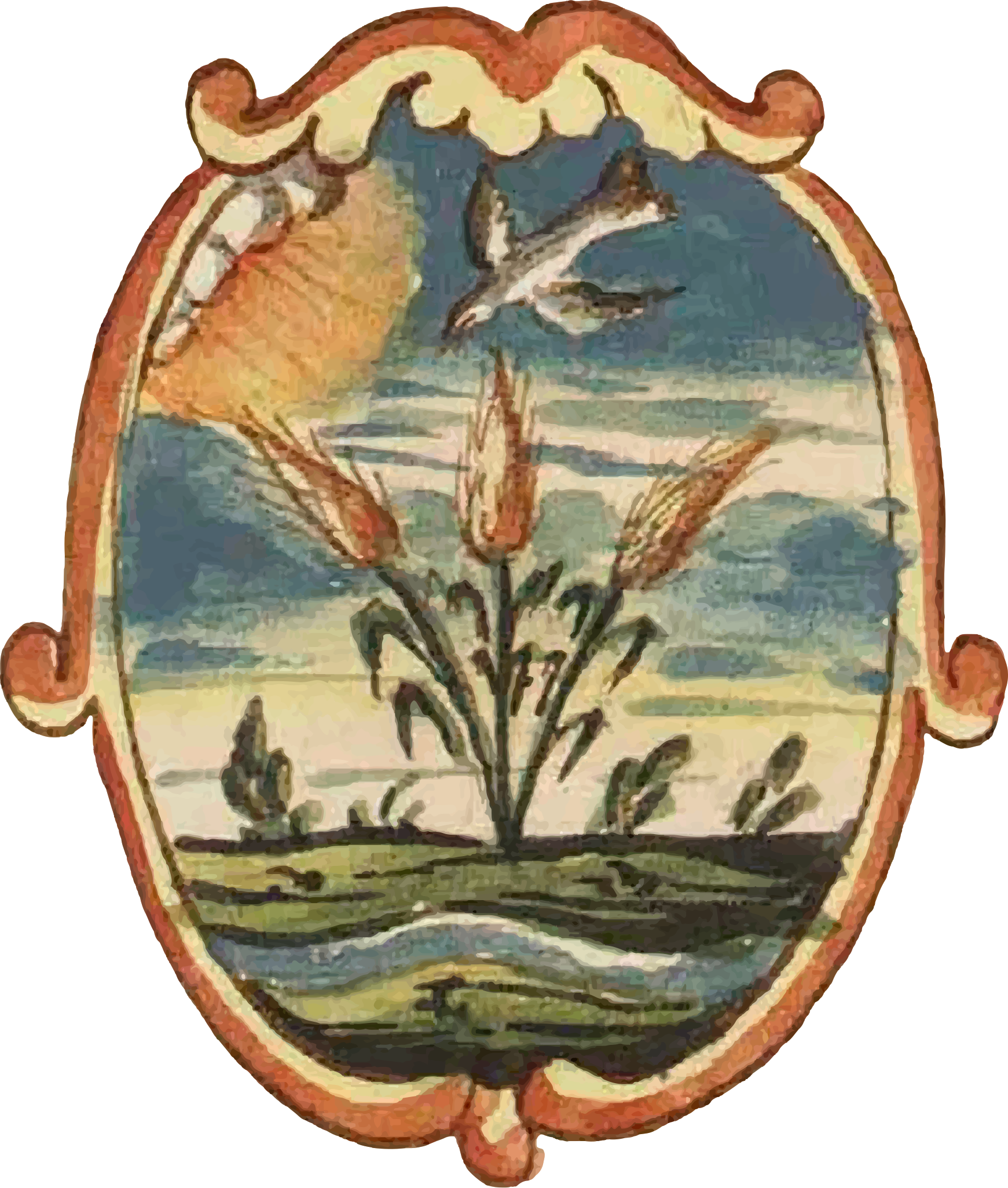
Coat of arms of Crescia nobiliary family, an Albanian dynasty allied to Habsburg Spain against the Ottoman rule

Meanwhile, Habsburg Spain (assisted by Habsburg Austrians, the Republic of Venice, the Holy See and Poland-Lithuania) developed a network of espionage among Eastern Christians of the Ottoman Balkans and Caucasus. The first goal was to secretly convert anti-Ottoman Eastern Orthodox dissidents to Eastern Catholicism—because the Eastern Orthodox Church was loyal to the Sultan of Sultans, and it preferred Dhimmi autonomy from the Millet system to Uniatism with Papal supremacy)—or at least into vassals of the Hispanic Monarchy or the HRE. The second goal was to prepare future revolts against the Ottoman Caliphate among Albanians, Serbo-Croatians, Greeks, Cypriots, Armenians, Georgians, Maronite Lebanese, and Arab Christians (including people such as Giovanni Renesi I, Giovanni Renesi II, Teodoro Crescia, Giorgio Basta, Mark Gjini, Tom Plezha, Nikollë Mekajshi, Nikollë Bardhi, Manthos Papagiannis, Petros Lantzas, Emmanuel Mormoris, Makarios Melissenos, Athanasius I of Ohrid, and Dionysios Skylosophos)—or at least to be informed about the Ottoman military and to counter Barbary corsairs by hiring exiled Stratioti Rums to serve as privateers for Naples and Sicily.

Some anti-Ottoman projects that resulted from these Spanish intrigues were the anti-Ottoman revolts of 1565–1572, the Albanian revolt of 1566–1571, the Convention of Mat, the Himara Revolt of 1596, the Thessaly rebellion (1600), the Convention of Dukagjin, the Epirus revolt of 1611, and the Convention of Kuçi.

=== Spanish–Ottoman corsair war and colonization attempts in Morocco ===
Starting in the 17th and 18th centuries, the Spanish Empire and the Ottoman Empire continued their centuries-long rivalry for Indo-Mediterranean supremacy, though mostly via indirect campaigns and proxy forces. Although the Mediterranean Sea and the Indian Ocean were no longer war zones as during the peak of the Ottoman–Spanish War, this was still a relevant military region because of constant raids and skirmishes between the Ottomans and the Spanish through privateering—mainly the Ottoman-backed Barbary corsairs (with their base on the Barbary Coast) and the Spanish-backed Uskoks (with their base on the Adriatic Sea). The two empires largely avoided formal war, as both were more focused on the Eighty Years' War and the Ottoman–Persian Wars (clashing only directly in the Thirty Years' War in Eastern Europe during the 1620s). However, the two empires fought in recurring naval battles, raids, and sieges, often using allies such as the Knights Hospitaller (Malta), Genoa (main investor in the Spanish Mediterranean fleet in exchange for renting Spanish ships for the Genoese navy), and Venice or local proxies (Moroccan dynasties, Algerian corsairs, Persian, and Ethiopian states).

In addition, during the reign of Philip III of Spain—more pacifistic, who preserved the Pax Hispanica without risking total wars, but with a significant anti-Islamic foreign policy—Spain achieved some conquests in Morocco (ally of Morocco), such as Larache and Mehdya. However, Spain failed in its attempts to conquer Algiers, Tunis, and Alexandria, as well as to stop Barbary corsairs, Jewish pirates, and Anglo-Dutch-Turkish piracy (the Barbary Coast became its main objective in the Mediterranean, and it became a refuge territory for expelled Moriscos), a constant menace to the Spanish treasure fleet. In response to Moroccan-Ottoman support for Morisco renegades (such as the Republic of Salé), Spain became a refuge for renegade Berber emirs and sultans who disliked Moroccan and Ottoman rule in the region.

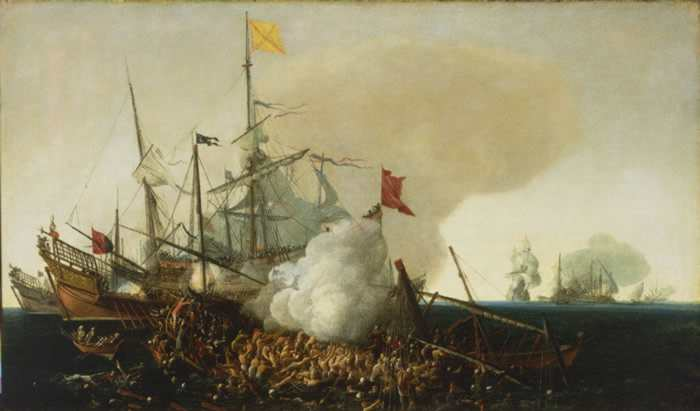
Spanish galleons against Barbary galleys. Cornelis Vroom, 1615

Spain (including its Italian territories and Portugal until 1640) held enclaves in North Africa (Ceuta, Melilla, Oran, Mazalquivir and at times Larache and Mamora) and a large navy in the Western Mediterranean (and the Adriatic Sea to patrol Habsburg Croatia). At the same time, the Ottomans controlled North African regencies (Algiers, Tunis, and Tripoli) and the Eastern Mediterranean (the Levant, the Aegean islands, and the Balkans); the Ottomans were allies of Saadi Morocco and briefly of Venice (who, because of their economic interests, saw the Ottomans as partners against Spanish-Austrian expansionism in Northern Italy). The Golden Age of Piracy occurred throughout the 17th century, in which the Barbary corsairs raided Christian shipping and coasts. As naval historian Alan Jamieson observed, until 1800 the Barbary pirates (as Ottoman vassals or freelancers) "captured and enslaved more than a million Christians". These Ottoman-backed corsairs usually raided the Spanish Levant and southern Italy. This practice prompted a military response from Habsburg Spain in the early 1600s (although without declaring war directly on the Sublime Porte, only on the Barbary states), because the Algerian corsairs had become the greatest maritime threat to Spain and Christendom. Under viceroys such as the Duke of Osuna (Pedro Téllez-Girón) in Sicily and Naples (1611–1620), as well as Emanuel Filibert of Savoy (Viceroy of Sicily after 1622), Spain's Armada del Mar Océano (Atlantic fleet)—which was undergoing improvement and expansion with Genoese assistance—waged periodic Mediterranean campaigns against Ottoman-allied ports, while Spanish officers and soldiers served as defensive troops in Malta and Italy.

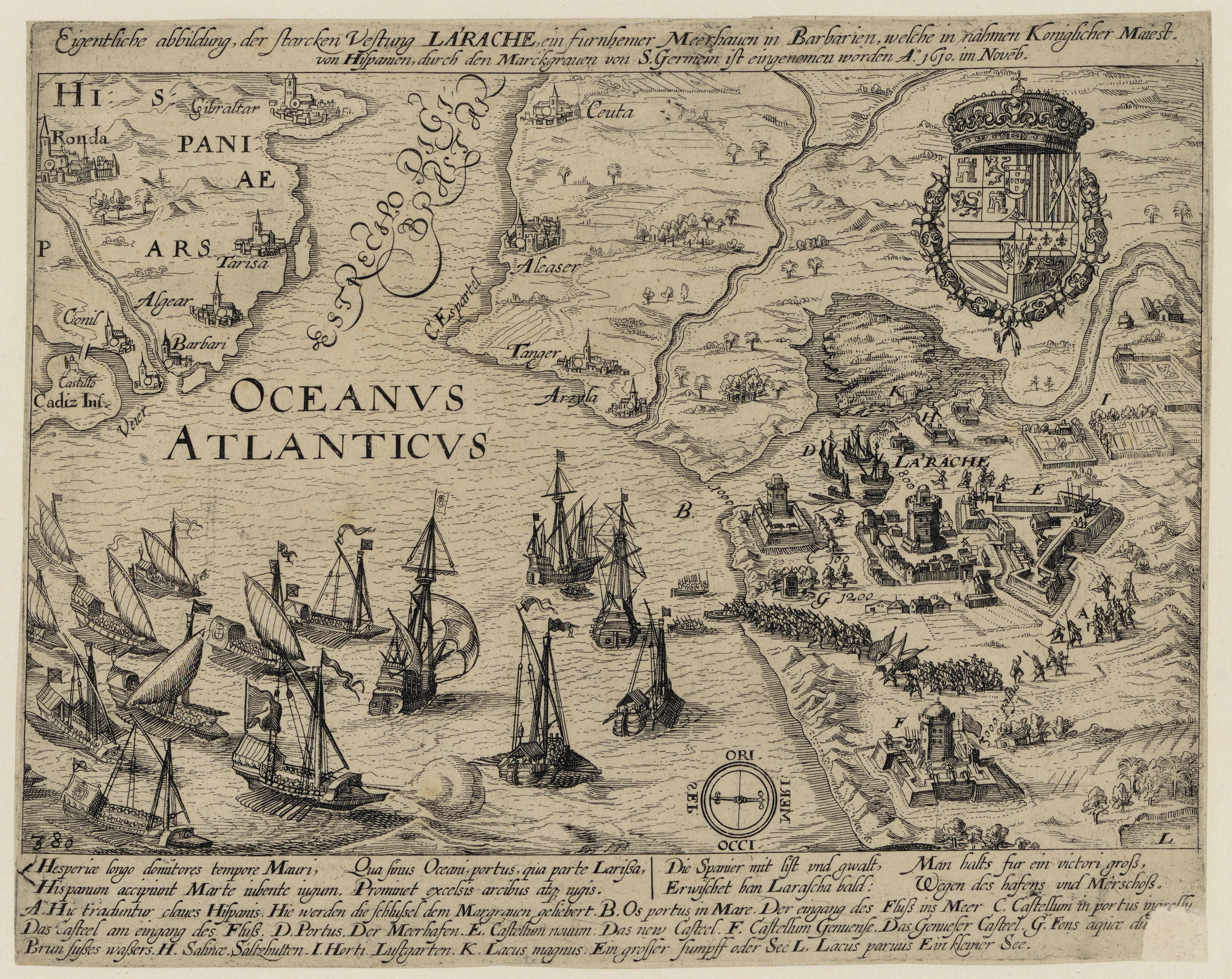
- Spanish conquest of Larache
  1600–1610: In 1600, the conflict shifted from the Eastern Mediterranean (dominated by the Ottoman Empire) to northwest Africa (where the Ottoman Navy was in decline). In 1601, a Spanish-Genoese campaign (led by Giovanni Andrea Doria) was launched against Ottoman Tunisia; then in 1601–1608, a major campaign was launched against Algiers, in an attempt to conquer it with the help of the Kingdom of Kuku and Kabylians led by Amar ben Amar (although the Spaniards ultimately failed). The Battle of the Gulf of Cadiz took place in 1604. (In this battle, former Elizabethan Sea Dogs joined Barbary corsairs after the end of the Anglo-Spanish War.) In addition, naval actions took place in Longo Island (in North Africa). The Battle of Hammamet (which ended in failure for Spain) took place in 1605; also in 1605-1606, the Spaniards raided the city of Durazzo (on the coast of Albania) in an attempt to ruin an improvement in Venetian–Ottoman relations. The Anglo-Dutch-French-Barbary alliance was diluted in 1609 when the Twelve Years' Truce was reached; the Franco-Algerian war (1609–1628) also started, in which Spain and France sometimes cooperated militarily in the Mediterranean—as in the Raid on La Goulette (1609) under the leadership of Luis Fajardo, where an Ottoman corsair fleet was destroyed. (Before reaching Goulette, Fajardo raided Mazalquivir and Tlemcen, and he also transported expelled Moriscos to Oran.) Also, in the early 1600s Spain landed forces on Morocco's Atlantic coast as a consequence of Mohammed esh Sheikh el Mamun's request for help in 1608 against Zidan Abu Maali. By November 1610, the Spanish captured the Moroccan port of Larache after al-Ma'mun ceded the city to Spain, in return for their help in the Moroccan dynastic struggle after the 1603 death of Ahmad al-Mansur (in which the Ottomans, the Dutch, the English and the French were also interested in intervening). Nevertheless, no significant battle occurred—the Marquis of San Germán simply took possession on 20 November 1610. Spain's primary goal was to preserve the independence of Morocco from possible Ottoman occupation or development of hostile European enclaves, as well as ending the Salé-Mamora-Larache axis of the Barbary slave trade.
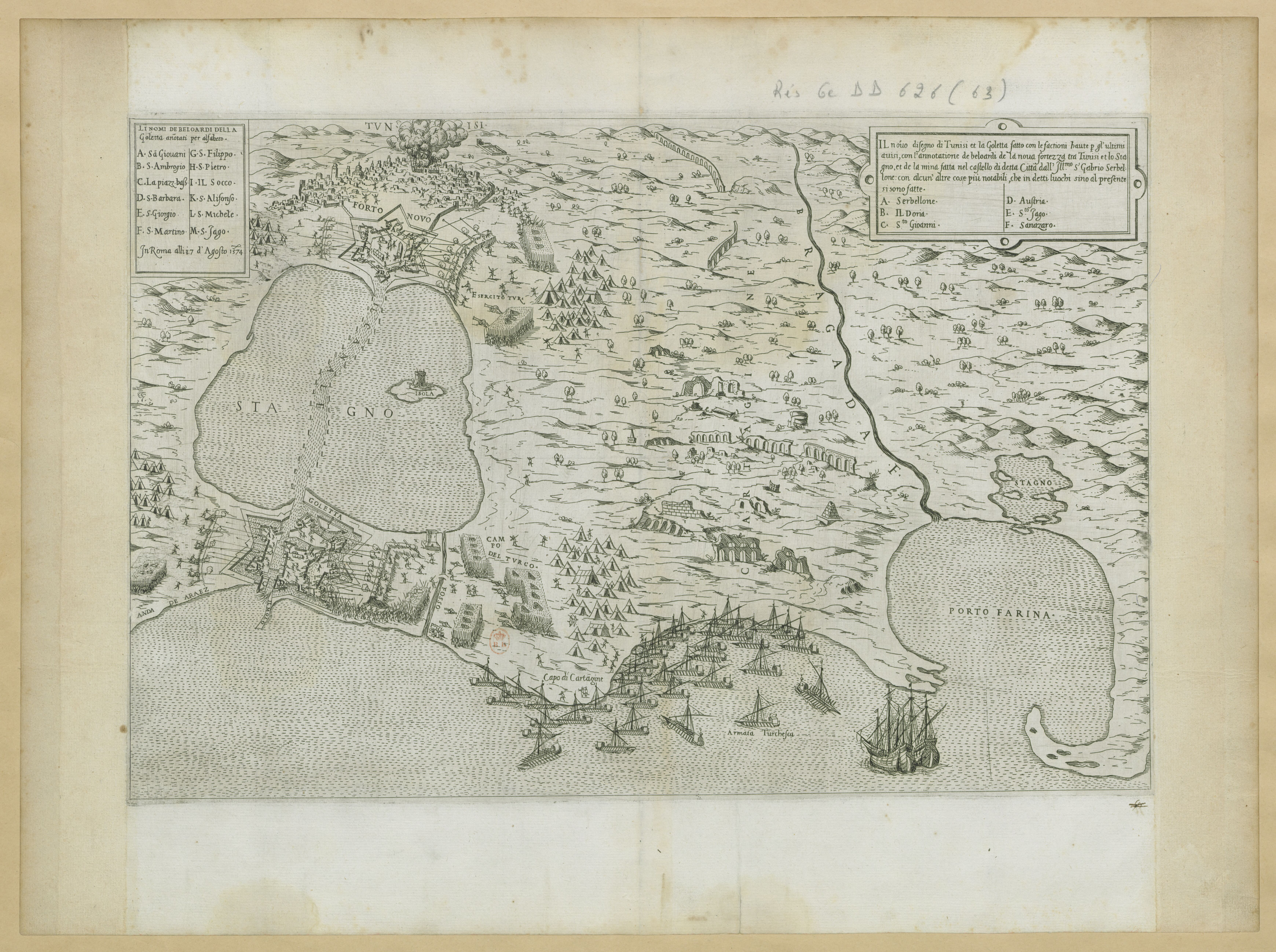
- La Goulette at the time of the Spanish-Barbary War
  1611–1615: Iberian, Sicilian and Neapolitan fleets struck Tunisian ports, for example, in the Raid on Kerkennah (28 Sep–2 Oct 1611) by Álvaro de Bazán’s squadron; this raid overran the corsair base in the Kerkennah Islands (Tunis), killing hundreds of Turkish–Tunisian defenders and freeing scores of Christian captives. A few months later, on 23 May 1612, Spanish galley captain Antonio Pimentel led six galleys into the harbor of La Goulette (the port of Tunis) and burned seven pirate ships, capturing the remaining three. Spanish chronicles emphasize that these raids destroyed newly built Ottoman-style ships (belonging to Dutch-born corsair Zymen Danseker) intended for Atlantic raids and possible Muslim colonization of the Americas. These actions illustrate how Spain struck into Ottoman Tunis to suppress piracy (and deter Ottoman collusion). In August 1613, the Battle of Cape Corvo took place, in which Ottavio d'Aragona successfully raided the Karaburun Peninsula in modern Turkey. Also, on the Moroccan front in 1611, the rebellion of the self-proclaimed Mahdi, Ahmed ibn Abi Mahalli, started against the Saadi sultans. These sultans lost popularity after depending on foreign assistance to rule, from Iberians and Habsburg Italians for al-Ma'mun, or from the Franco-Ottomans and Anglo-Dutch for Zidan. This led indirectly to the Spanish capture of the Zaydani Library in 1612, after the Spanish Navy at Andalusia intercepted a French corsair navy with the royal treasures of the Saadis (who feared that rebels would destroy it because of blaming the Sunni Muslims of Bid'ah). In 1614, Admiral Luis Fajardo led a large fleet to seize La Mámora (now Mehdia), then a pirate haven near Rabat where Muley Zidan (who was at war with Spain since 1611) provided a base for Dutch corsairs. This Capture of La Mámora in August 1614 was virtually uncontested: as Spanish accounts note, Fajardo's 20-ship squadron arrived after most corsairs had fled; sank two blocking vessels; and occupied the fortress with little resistance. They then renamed it San Miguel de Ultramar and held it until Moroccan forces retook it in 1681. Meanwhile, many Moriscos renegades living in Salé turned to piracy and expanded their area of operations to the Atlantic Ocean by 1614, owing to leadership by the corsair Ibrahim Vargas (who was among the economic elite of Hornachos before the expulsion of the Moriscos). Vargas was rewarded by Moroccan sultans with an autonomous Republic of Salé, which later joined forces with the Corsairs of Algiers led by the Dutch pirate Jan Janszoon.
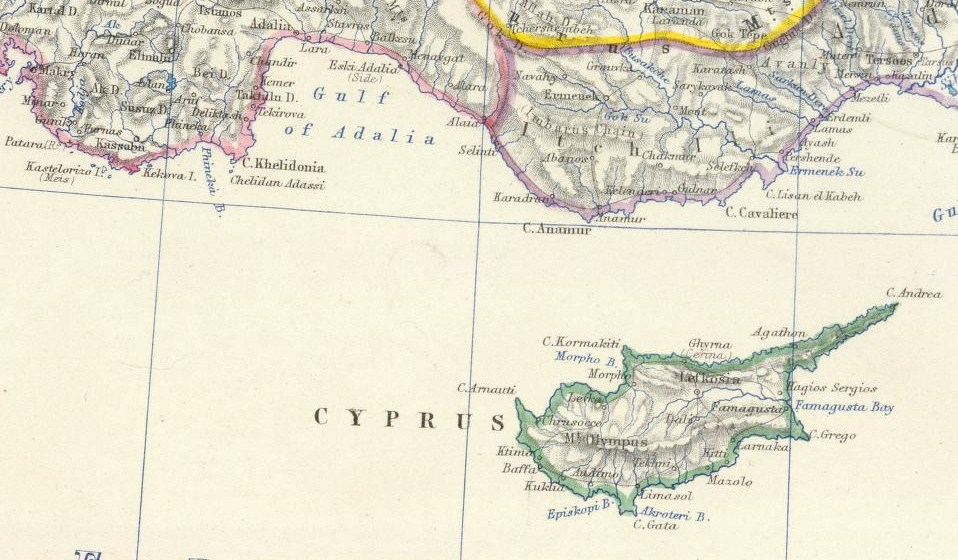
- Cape Gelidonya location
  1616–1619: In the Eastern Mediterranean, Spanish warships occasionally crossed into Ottoman waters to support Christian allies. One noted naval engagement was the Battle of Cape Gelidonya (14 July 1616), when six Spanish galleons (under Francisco de Ribera, sent by Viceroy Osuna) intercepted an Ottoman fleet of 55 galleys off the south coast of Anatolia. The Spaniards fought off a much larger Ottoman force, inflicting heavy losses in a sort of "little Lepanto". However, the following year saw a Spanish defeat: on 4 August 1617, a Spanish convoy of troops from Cartagena was ambushed at Cape Palos by 16 Algerine (Ottoman–Algerian) galleys, as the Dutch-Algerian admiral Sulayman Reis overwhelmed the Spanish, who lost two ships and about 700 men. Also in Venice, the Giovanni faction (Italianist and thus anti-Spanish), which had risen to power during the late 1500s, started to increase its rapprochement with the Franco-Ottoman alliance, the Dutch Republic, and the Protestant Union in 1617 against the domination of Spain-HRE among Italian states; the faction thereby helped anti-Habsburg war efforts in the Adriatic Sea—such as the Montferrat Succession, the Uskok War, and the Spanish-Barbary War, including engagements such as the 1617 Battle of Ragusa, the 1618 Battle of Gibraltar—and being a prelude to the Thirty Years' War. During 1618-1620, the Dutch and the Spanish briefly cooperated under Mooy Lambert and Miguel de Vidazábal against the Corsairs of Algiers in the Dutch–Barbary War, which ended when the Eighty Years' War restarted.
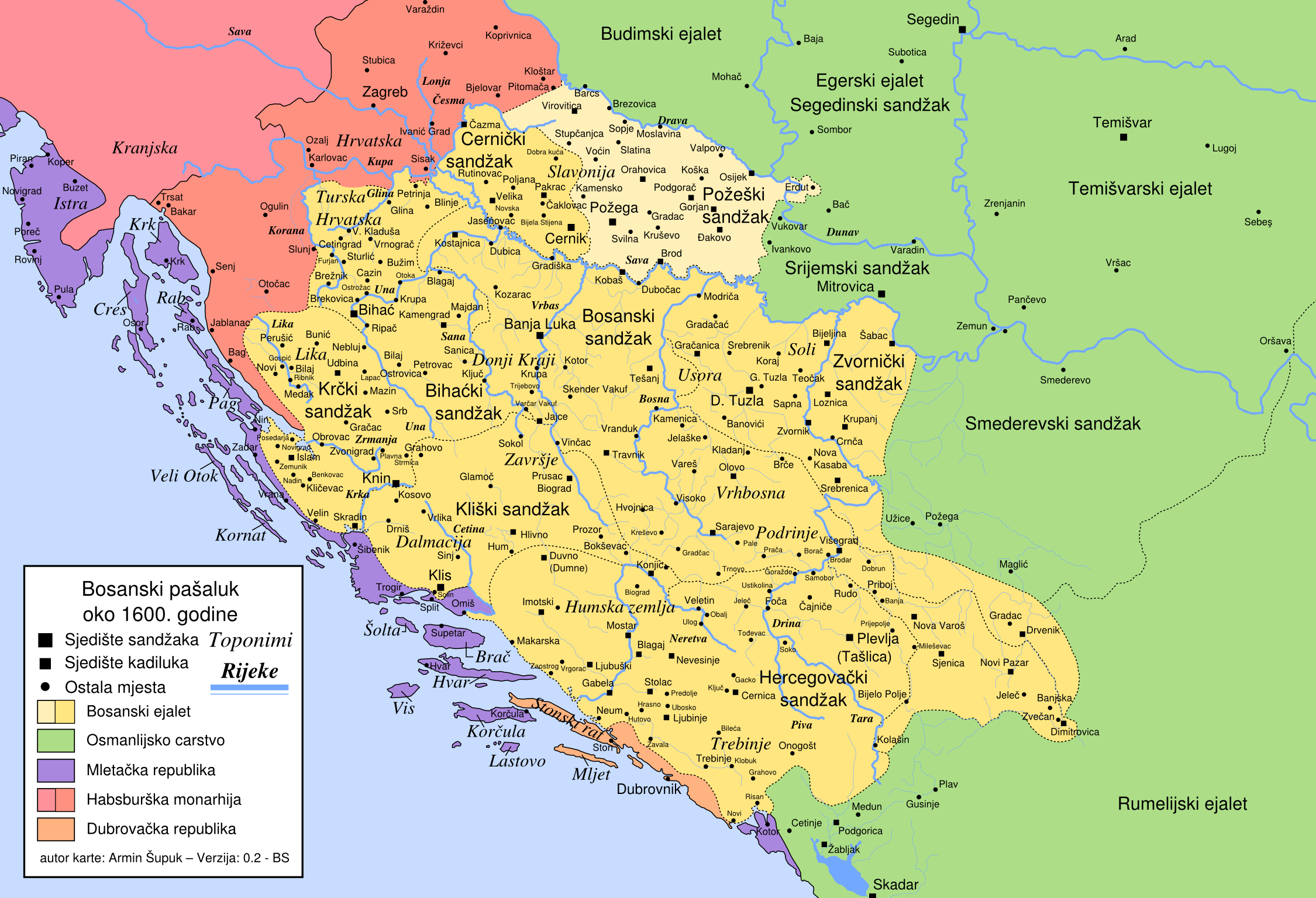
- Map of Dalmatia in the early 1600s, partitioned between Venetians and Ottoman Bosnia
  1620–1625: Throughout the 1620s, the conflict blended formal battles with corsair warfare and the arrival of anti-Habsburg European navies. During 1622, the Dutch Republic developed alliances with numerous North African countries against Spain at the start of the Thirty Years' War overseas, concluding a treaty of peace and friendship with Ottoman Algiers and ending a Dutch–Barbary war (although having a brief new war in 1624). The Kingdom of England acted similarly after ending the English expedition to Algiers (1620–1621), thus restarting Anglo-Turkish piracy against Habsburg Spain. In March 1621, the Battle of Chios took place, in which a Spanish-Italian-Flemish force led by Carlo Doria triumphed over the Ottomans in the Aegean Sea. Then Fadrique de Toledo defeated a Dutch-Danish navy in the Battle of Gibraltar (1621) before combining their forces with Corsairs of Algiers. When Philip IV of Spain and the Count-Duke of Olivares rose to power in 1621, the Spanish Navy was sent to the Atlantic Ocean and northern Europe to aid Ibero-America and the Catholic League (Germany), the Mediterranean becoming a minor theater in the geopolitics of Habsburg Spain—although 12 reinforced galleys led by Carlo Doria were stationed in Monaco and Finale Ligure to patrol the region against the Ottomans and other hostile European navies (taking action in the Relief of Genoa against France). In June 1624, a combined Spanish–Maltese fleet under the Marquess of Santa Cruz defeated the Tunisians off the Gulf of Tunis, capturing all 14 enemy galleys. Three weeks later (on 26–27 June) Bazán's fleet met a Barbary armada at Palermo (near Sicily). Despite being outnumbered, the Christians sank seven and captured six corsair ships, freeing 400 Christian galley slaves. In July 1624, another Spanish-led force (joined by the Genoese and the Maltese) defeated an Algerine–Tunisian fleet in the Battle of the Dalmatian Coast (near Venetian Dalmatia), seizing seven galleys—a clear blow to Ottoman naval power. In October 1624, Spanish, Neapolitan, and allied galleys under Diego Pimentel defeated six Algerine corsairs in the Battle of San Pietro Island (near Sardinia), destroying the flagship and capturing four ships. These victories reflect Spain's effective use of combined Catholic squadrons (including Italian allies such as the Genoese, Tuscan, and Papal navies) to contain Ottoman privateer fleets in the Western Mediterranean.

After 1625, the fighting with the Ottomans tapered off, as Spain's attention shifted to European wars (the Thirty Years' War and French–Habsburg rivalry) and internal crises (Portugal's independence in 1640); in addition, the Spanish Mediterranean fleet entered a period of decadence because of the economic effects of Spanish bankruptcy and internal struggles among Genoese bankers. (All of this led to an informal truce starting in 1634, as Olivares ordered avoiding engagements with the Ottomans or the Algerians.) Starting in 1635, the Mediterranean fleet focused on the Franco-Spanish War (1635–1659). Nonetheless, corsair raids continued in both directions, although to a lesser extent. Barbary pirates from Algiers, Tunis and Tripoli harassed Spanish shipping and raided coastal towns (e.g. the 1625 Sack of Málaga by Moroccan corsairs). The Spanish also cooperated with Venice and the Knights of Malta in later decades to fight Ottoman fleets—notably aiding Venice in the Cretan War (1645–1669) and the Morean War (1684–1699)—although the Crusading movement declined in favor of raison d'état (national interest) after the arrival of the Westphalian system. So began the Decline of Spain as protector of the res publica Christiana (international community of Christian peoples and states) against the Ottoman Caliphate, losing its traditional Christian allies while Bourbon France consolidated as the main defender of Christians in the Ottoman Empire. During this period, Spanish Sicily was the main base of operation for the Spaniards against Ottoman raids in the Mediterranean Sea until the War of the Spanish Succession.

== See also ==
- Barbary Coast
- Barbary corsairs
- Spanish-Moroccan Wars
- Moroccan–Portuguese conflicts
- Anglo-Moroccan alliance
- Anglo-Turkish piracy
- Protestantism and Islam
- Turco-Calvinism
- Franco-Ottoman alliance
- Habsburg–Persian alliance
- Ottoman–Habsburg wars
- Holy League
- Iberian Union
- Ottoman–Portuguese confrontations
- Portuguese–Safavid wars
- Morisco
- Mudéjar
- Marrano
- Sephardic Jews
- Jewish pirates
