= Battle of Cape Gelidonya =

1616 Ottoman–Habsburg naval battle

- Part of Spanish–Ottoman wars
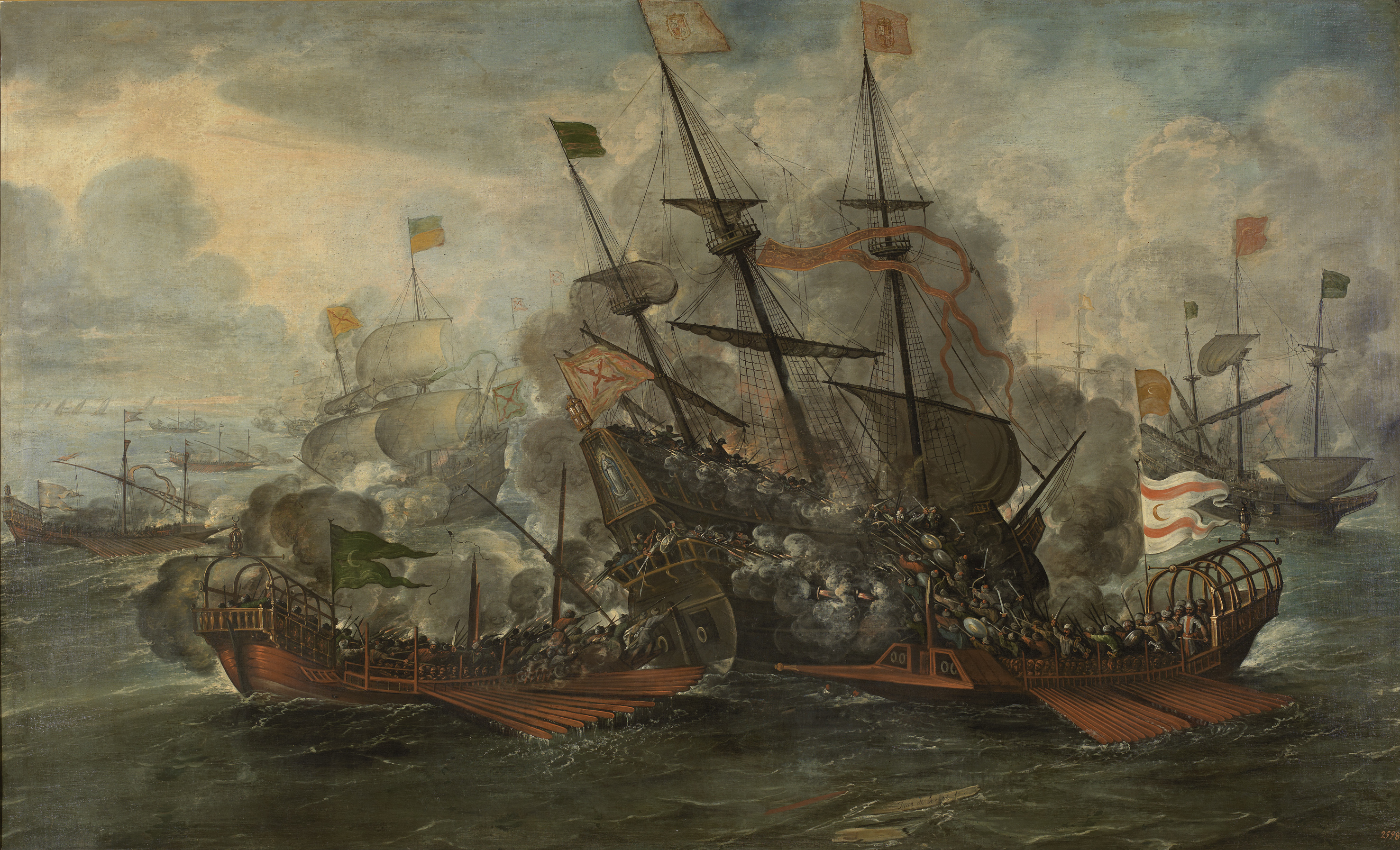
- Spanish galleons fighting off Ottoman galleys. Oil on canvas by Juan de la Corte (1597–1660), Naval Museum of Madrid.
Date	14–16 July 1616
Location	Off Cape Gelidonya, Anatolian south coast
Result	Spanish victory

Belligerents
(Spain) Spanish Empire	Ottoman Empire

Commanders and leaders
Francisco de Ribera	Bey of Rhodes

Strength
2 galleons 2 carracks 1 hulk 1 patache 1,600 soldiers	55 galleys 12,000 soldiers

Casualties and losses
34 killed 93 wounded	10 galleys sunk 23 galleys damaged 3,200 killed

The Battle of Cape Gelidonya or Celidonia took place on 14 July 1616 during the Ottoman–Habsburg struggle for the control of the Mediterranean. During its course, a small privateer fleet owned by Spanish Viceroy of Sicily Pedro Téllez-Girón, Duke of Osuna, under the command of Francisco de Ribera, was attacked by an Ottoman fleet that vastly outnumbered it while cruising off Cyprus. Despite this, the Spanish ships, mostly galleons, managed to repel the Ottomans, whose fleet consisted mainly of galleys, inflicting heavy losses.

The battle, sometimes called in historiography a "Little Lepanto", became a turning point in Mediterranean naval warfare, where the galleys employed by the Ottoman navy were left obsolete by the heavily armed western sailing ships, like galleons and carracks, increasingly used by Spain and other Christian nations. The victory was further made significant by its closeness to the Ottoman core and the little size of the forces required to defeat an Ottoman fleet. From that point, the technical and strategic distance between the Christian and Muslim navies would expand over the coming centuries.

== Background ==
In 1616, a royal decree by Philip III banned viceroys from engaging in privateering. The decision obstructed Viceroy of Sicily, the Duke of Osuna, who had achieved an unprecedented success through privateering actions after earning a license for it in 1613, attracting political enmities in the court which had likely influenced Philip's stance. Osuna resorted to bribery to maintain his activities, leading to his appointment as Viceroy of Naples in 1616, but at the same time, he decided to innovate in maritime tactics to maximize the power of the Spanish armada. His first move was to build a private fleet of sailing ships.

Mainstream belief at the time was that sailing ships were inferior to the rowing ships commonly used in Mediterranean warfare, as it had been demonstrated in events like the Battle of Zonchio, where the Venetian carracks used by both sides failed due to a lack of maneuverability and wind. However, Osuna and Ensign Francisco de Ribera y Medina were convinced that western advances in artillery and shipbuilding had reversed the situation. Previously, the Dutch privateer Zymen Danseker, hired by the Regency of Algiers, had built several rudimentary sailing ships for their Barbary corsairs, which had turned out hard to defeat. Dauser then built a dozen of ships for the navy of the Ottoman Tunisia in 1612, but Osuna had the fleet destroyed in port in a night raid by captain Antonio Pimentel before it could set sail.

Osuna started the building of several sailing ships, owned and funded by himself to ease bureaucracy. In order to test their effectivity, Osuna ordered Ribera to raid the Tunisian port of La Goulette with the galleon San Juan Bautista. Ribera duly captured four Moor vessels with minimal casualties, an enormous success that confirmed their impressions. After reports of an Ottoman armada getting ready to attack Calabria, Ribera sailed off on 15 July from Sicily to Eastern Mediterranean waters with five more ships. He was to undertake privateering against Ottoman vessels and ports in the area between Cyprus and the region of Çukurova, hoping to delay or divert the armada.

== Previous moves ==
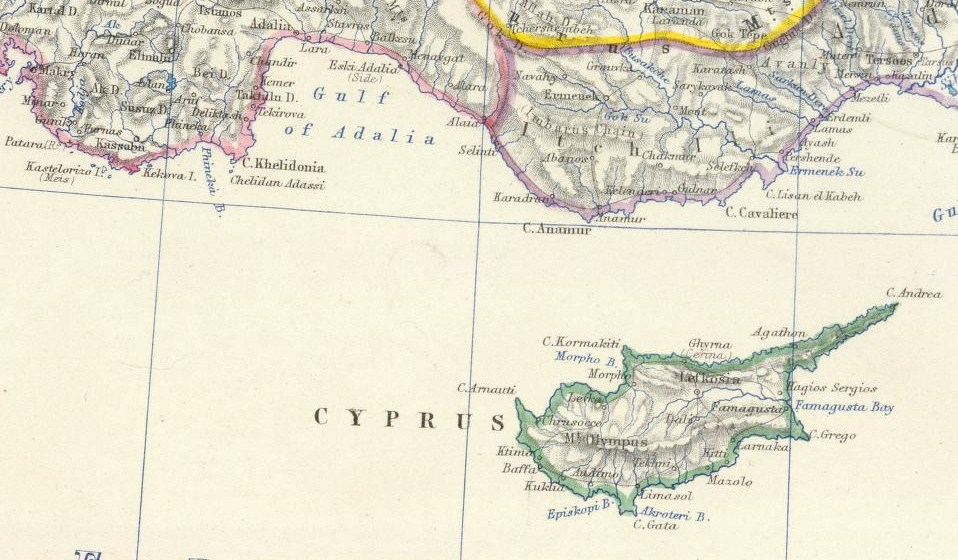
Area of Ribera's cruise.

The Spanish fleet sailed to the island of Cyprus, then under Ottoman rule, where Francisco de Ribera ordered that land be sighted prior to initiating of the cruise. During the mission 16 merchant caramoussals were captured by Ribera's fleet off Cape Gelidonya, as well as an English privateer in Famagusta and a large number of minor vessels at sea. In addition, ten warships were sunk or burnt in the port of Larnaca, whose defenses were also destroyed by a landing party which suffered no loss. Five enemy privateers remained in Famagusta to wait for Ribera to leave.

The Ottoman governor of Cyprus, who had been rapidly informed regarding the Spanish activities, called for help from the Ottoman armada. Ribera, warned of a relief force coming from Chios thanks to the capture of a merchant vessel coming from Constantinople, initially intended to intercept it before it could join with more Ottoman ships. However, after being advised not to risk get caught in the meltemi, he decided to instead wait for his pursuers off Cape Gelidonya. The place was more convenient than remaining in Cyprus, as its remoteness would prevent the privateers from taking Ribera between two fires from the back. An Ottoman fleet of 55 galleys appeared off the cape few days later, on 14 July.

== Opposing forces ==
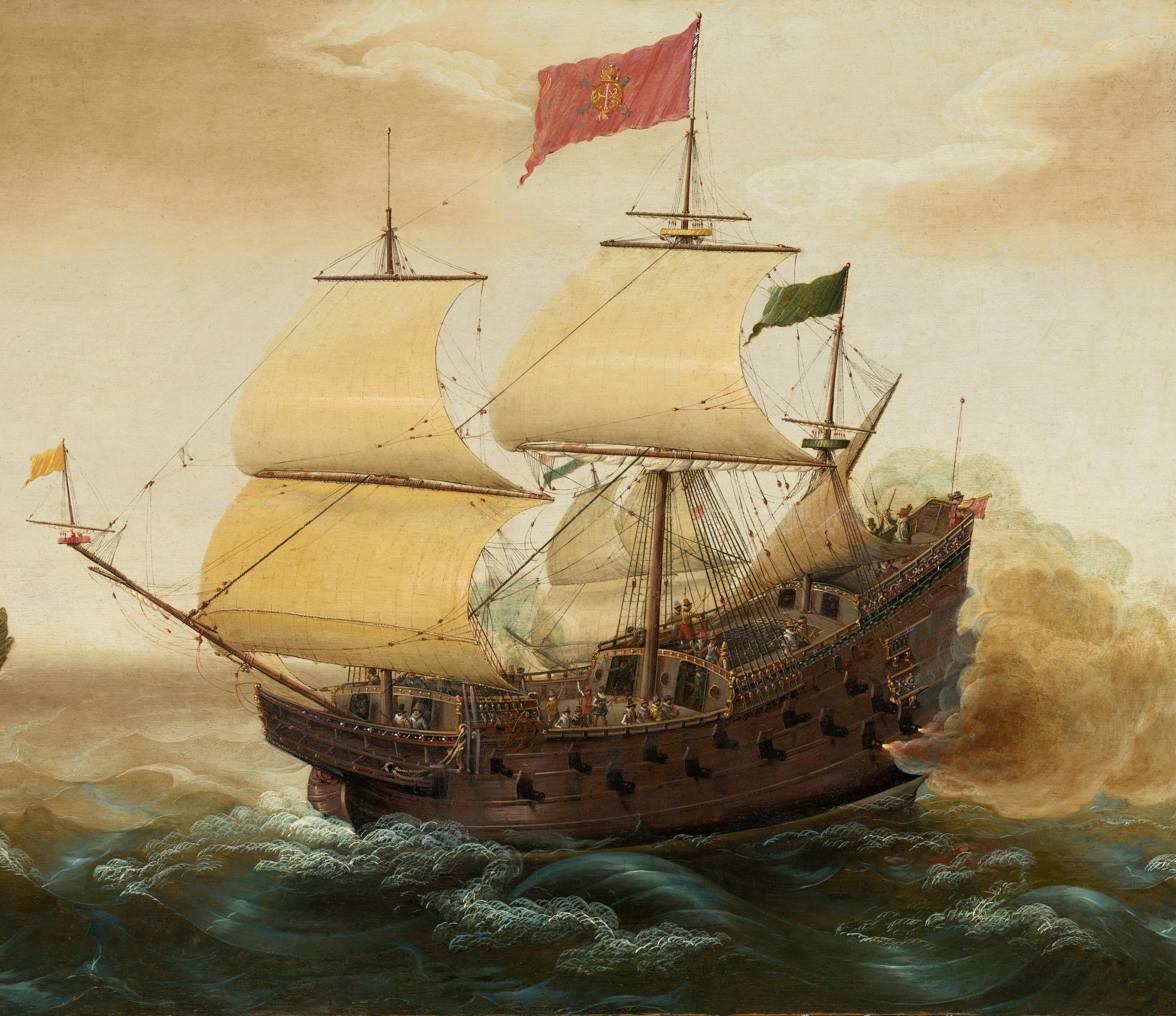
Spanish galleon, by Cornelis Verbeeck.

The new Spanish fleet was composed of two galleons, the 52-gun flagship Nuestra Señora de la Concepción and the 34-gun Almirante, commanded by Manuel Serrano; two carracks, the 27-gun Buenaventura or "Capitana", commanded by Ínigo de Urquiza, and the 34-gun Carretina under Juan de Valmaseda; the 30-gun hulk San Juan Bautista or "Urqueta", commanded by Juan Cereceda; and the 14-gun patache Santiago under Ensign Garraza. Osuna had selected new crews, with many Basque crewmen among them. Aboard the ships were about 1,600 Spanish and Italian soldiers, of whom 1,000 were musketeers.

Naval historian Julian Corbett believed Osuna imitated and deliberately surpassed several conventions of the English navy of the time. The Nuestra Señora de la Concepción was about the same size as the first-rate English ship Prince Royal, launched in 1610, and carried heavier weapons. Osuna's fleet had also increased the number of embarked soldiers through the Spanish custom of having them act as artillery crews, which were differentiated crews in the English ships.

Some sources call Ribera's fleet Las Cinco Llagas ("The Five Holy Wounds"), but in reality this name was given later by Osuna to another fleet of five ships also owned by him. These were commanded by Jacques Pierres, a French corsair with a long career in the Savoyard and Tuscan fleets before joining Osuna's entourage. According to French sources, Pierres was at the time embarked in Ribera's fleet and lent his experience for the operations undertaken.

The Ottoman armada was composed by 55 galleys, commanded by the Bey of Rhodes and secondarily by the Bey of Caramania. The fleet enjoyed around 12,000 fighting men on board and around 250-275 guns, counting their bow cannons and swivel guns, but due to their position in their prows they could probably train fewer than fifty guns against the Spanish at the same time. Their guns were also probably much lighter than their enemies'. The Ottoman Navy, at the time administrated by Grand Vizier Damat Halil Pasha, was coming from a small but sound defeat in Negroponte to Tuscan admiral Jacopo Inghirami and needed to recover their prestige.

== Order of battle ==
The Ottoman galleys formed into a huge crescent meant to encircle the Spanish. The galleys of the beys were located at the horns, while the flagship of the Ottoman Navy was in the center. For his part, Ribera's exact formation is discussed. Fernández Duro interpreted he formed in what would have been the first instance of line of battle in history, with four ships remaining close-hauled to each other bow to stern and the other two behind as a reserve. However, Ribera wrote he maneuvered with his ships as though they were galleys, leading Corbett to postulate rather that the Spanish fleet, while certainly divided in four and two, rather advanced in the traditional line abreast. Anderson believed Ribera charged this way and eventually ordered his ships to turn broadsides on to present their guns. In turn, he finds the fleet operated in two groups of three.

Ribera's Concepción stood at the right extreme, next to the Buenaventura and close to the Santiago. In order to avoid his ships becoming separated and overwhelmed individually in the light wind conditions, Ribera ordered to deploy rowing boats to tow their ships back into position if necessary. He further ordered to tie the other three ships together in the worst case. His exact orders at this (se diesen cabo por los costados tres) are also obscure. Anderson interpreted Ribera's intention as for the Almiranta, the Carretina and the San Juan to form a wagon fort-like triangle, tied bow to stern. In any case, the report indicates there was wind, so presumably there was no need to tie the ships.

== Battle ==
=== First day ===
The battle began at 9 am when the Ottoman galleys advanced while opening fire. Ribera held fire until the Ottoman ships were as close as possible before ordering to return fire to hit them point blank, a tactic known as fuego a la española ("Spanish fire"), a tocapenoles ("with their rigs touching") or a la veneciana ("Venetian fire"). The Spanish also fired with a variety of ammunition, including conventional cannonballs, incendiary balls and chain shots, which made their artillery highly effective. They kept the Ottoman vessels at bay until sunset, upon which the attackers then withdrew to their initial positions with eight galleys about to sink and many others damaged. After nightfall, the Spanish lit their lanterns and kept their fleet together with the help of their boats.

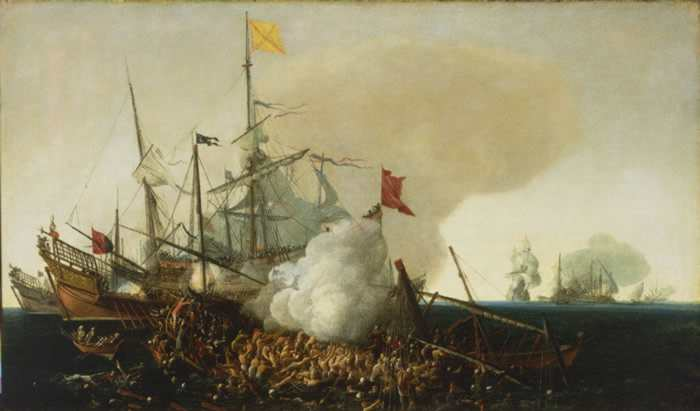
Spanish galleons against Barbary galleys. Cornelis Vroom, 1615.

=== Second day ===
The attack was resumed the next morning, when, after a night war council, the Ottomans attacked in two groups which separately attempted to capture the Concepción and the Almirante. They managed to close up enough to enter the range of the Spanish muskets, but the Spanish artillery again prevented them to attempt to board the ships. Although they succeeded to throw grappling hooks on the Carretina, the San Juan intruded between them firing with her own artillery, while a squad of galleys attempting to help them was fought off by the Concepción from the other side. Unable to board, the Ottoman artillerymen targeted the sailing ships' rigging, but after achieving little, the Ottoman force withdrew in the evening with another 10 galleys heeling over.

Compared to the previous day, the Ottomans had achieved more significant damage, capturing the Concepción's rowing boat and forcing the Hispanics to work during the night to repair the broken rigging. Ribera had also suffered light wounds in his face, and his ships were starting to run out of gunpowder and cannonballs from battling so many enemies, which forced him to distribute their remaining reserves between them. However, the Ottoman fleet had taken much heavier damage again, returning with thousands of casualties and wounded and half of their galleys damaged. That night a new council of war took place during which the Ottomans decided to resume the action at dawn.

=== Third day ===
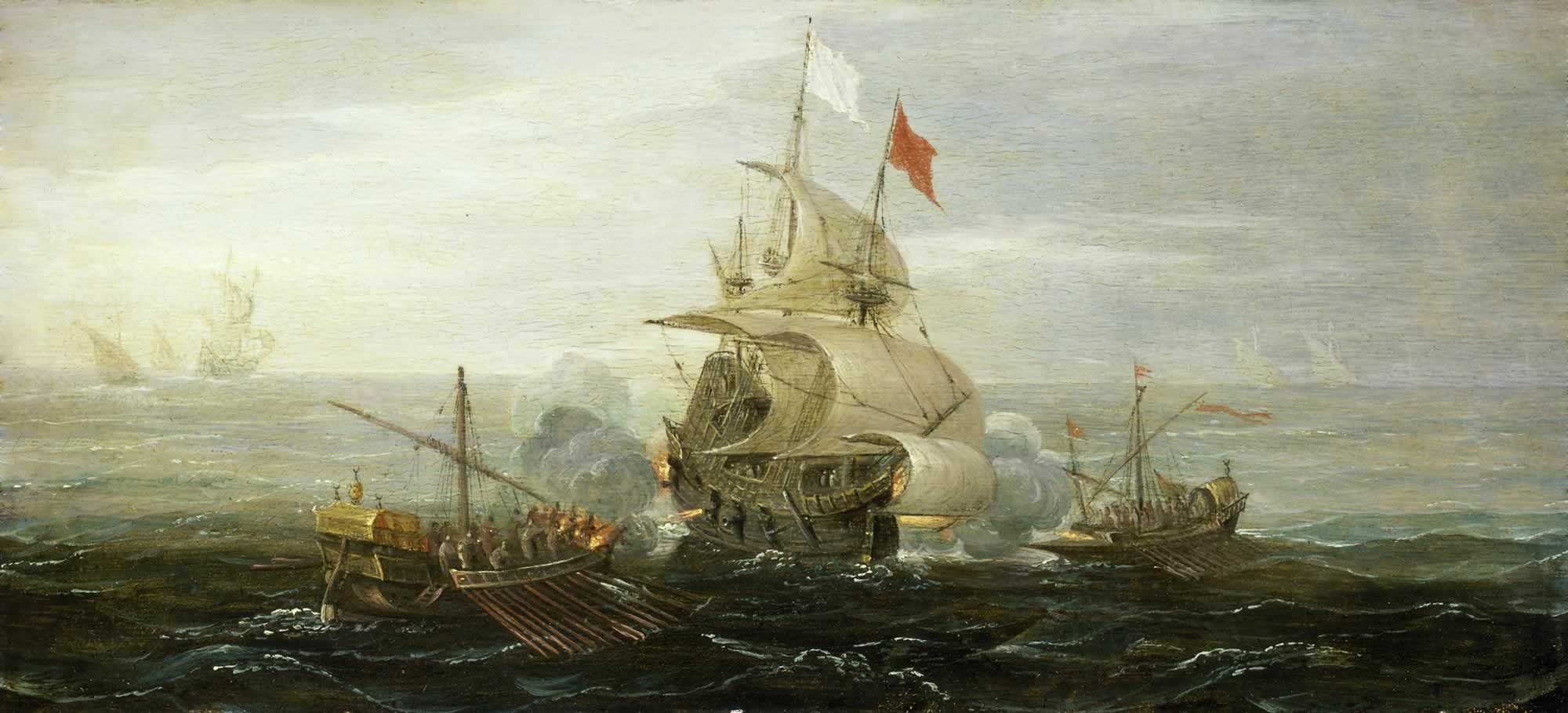
French ship against Barbary galleys, by Aert Anthoniszoon.

The third and last day, after a speech that boosted their morale, the Ottomans attacked with great resolve and managed to grapple the Carretina, but the ships' high sides made it difficult for the Ottoman janissaries to climb up, leaving them vulnerable to the fire of the Spanish falconets. The Concepción also helped repel them from its side. Meanwhile, more galleys approached Ribera's flagship from the most favorable angle to exploit its blind spot, but the Spanish commander had foreseen such a possibility, ordered that the Santiago move to his ship's bow. The maneuver exposed the Ottoman galleys to the combined fire, which kept doing severe damage. Fighting continued until midday, when the Spaniards only had gunpowder left for six more hours of battle, but at this point the Ottomans finally retreated not to return, with another galley sunk, two dismasted, and 17 others severely damaged or heeling over.

In total, the Ottoman fleet suffered heavy losses, with 10 galleys sunk and another 23 disabled. 1,200 Janissaries and 2,000 sailors and rowers were killed. Ribera also reported hearing two cannon shots in the Ottoman flagship, which he identified as a signal that the fleet's commander had been either killed or gravely wounded. By comparison, the Spanish suffered 34 dead and 93 wounded, as well as severe damage to the rigging and hulls of the Concepción and the Santiago, which had to be towed by the other ships to Candia to be repaired. Once rearmed, Ribera headed for Brindisi, where he arrived with 15 more ships captured and much booty in gold.

== Aftermath ==
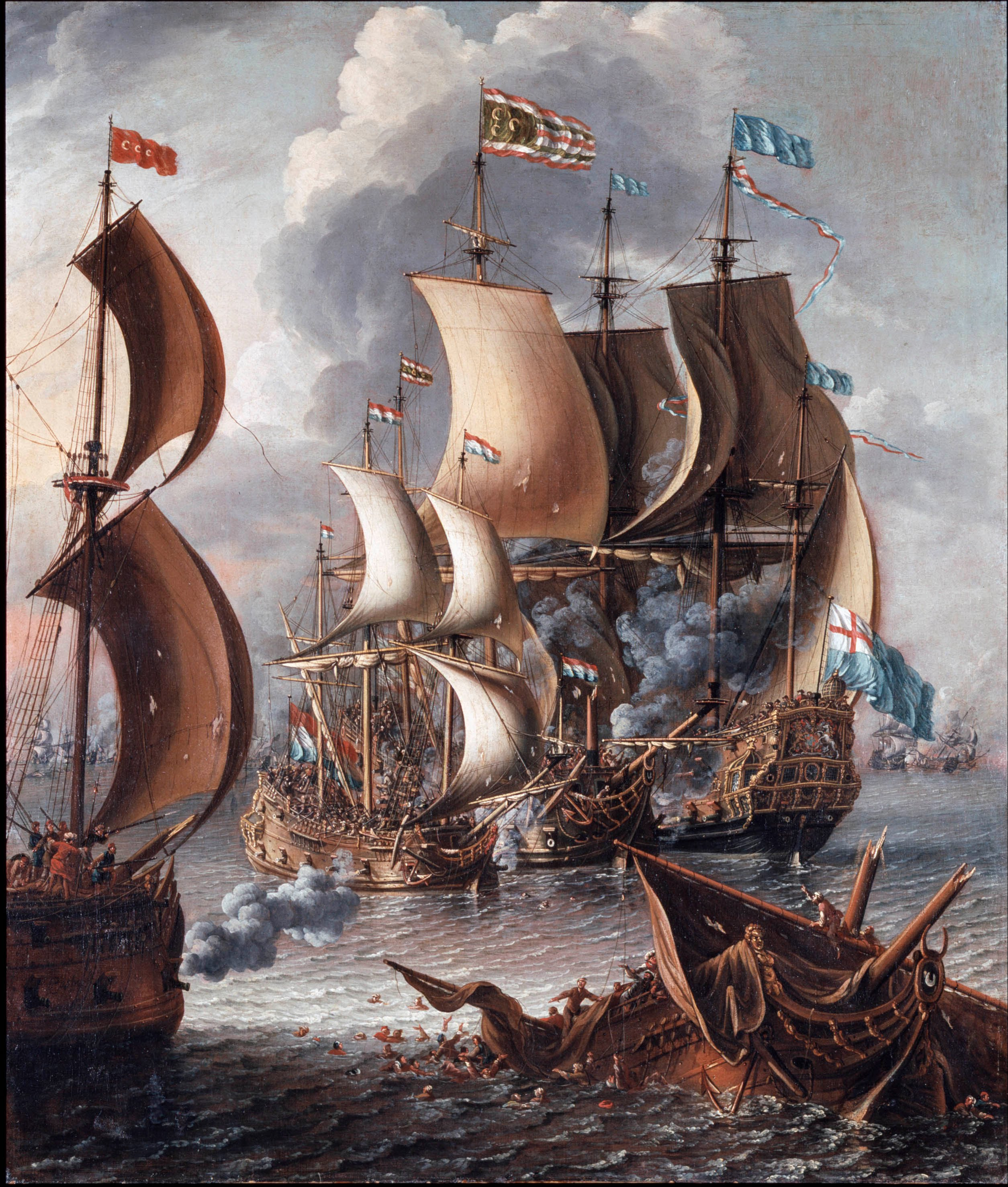
Europeans against Barbary pirates, by Laureys a Castro.

For his success, and by the Duke of Osuna's petition, Ribera was promoted to Admiral by King Philip III, who also rewarded him with the habit of the Order of Santiago. The fame granted by the battle came to equate him to Álvaro de Bazán, Marquis of Santa Cruz, another innovator of the Spanish armada, after gaining his own victory in the Battle of Vila Franca do Campo. The soldiers and sailors of the fleet were also rewarded by Osuna, who had arrived to Naples in July, when the fleet had already sailed off. In spite of the victory, the Spanish monarchy, characteristically slow in capitalizing on triumphs, denied Osuna's petition of funding a new fleet of twelve galleons, and reiterated the ban of privateering, which Osuna continued ignoring.

The victory in Gelidonya cemented Spanish hegemony in the central Mediterranean. Less than a month after the battle, Osuna found out the Calabrese renegade Arzan had sailed off from Constantinople with twelve galleys, so he tracked and destroyed them with ten galleys under the command of Íñigo Zapata, who killed the enemy captain. Afterwards, Ottavio d'Aragona, another of Osuna's lieutenants, continued the campaign disguising a Hispanic fleet as Turk ships and bombarding Constantinople. Despite the advantage, Philip III's court continued without making significant moves to establish a long lasting control on the Mediterranean, whose watch would keep tied to Osuna's initiative and victories. In December, the Duke engaged in an unofficial warfare with the Republic of Venice, a usual ally to the Ottomans, leading Ribera to defeat them in the Battle of Ragusa.

The longer lasting resonance of the battle came from the fact that, unlike most naval battles between Christians and Muslims up to the point, the battle had taken place in the maritime center of the Ottoman Empire and a handful of western ships had sufficed to defeat an overwhelmingly bigger fleet. With their failure to adapt in shipbuilding and tactics, the Ottoman naval threat progressively became limited to their own, reduced privateering actions against merchant trade. The battle opened the door for more European countries to assert themselves in the Mediterranean with their own ships, ironically undermining Spanish dominance in the process. Barbary corsairs, however, adapted thanks to the presence of Dutch and English crews, remaining a danger for Christian nations.

== Legacy ==
Spanish playwright and poet Don Luís Vélez de Guevara wrote the comedy "El asombro de Turquía y valiente toledano" ("The wonder of Turkey, the courageous Toledoan") to commemorate the battle.

== See also ==
- Battle of Diu – Naval battle won by Portugal through superior shipbuilding and artillery over Muslim ships
- Siege of Coron (1533–1534) – Naval battle where artillery from sailing ships was decisive against Ottoman galleys
- Skirmish at Cerigo Channel – Naval battle where artillery from sailing ships deterred a much larger Ottoman galley fleet
- Raid on La Goulette (1609) – First operation in the Mediterranean were only sailing ships were fielded
- Battle of Focchies – Naval battle where Venetian sailing ships defeated a much larger mixed Ottoman fleet

== Bibliography ==
- Anderson, Roger Charles (1952). Naval wars in the Levant, 1559-1853. Princeton University Press.
- Canales, Carlos; Rey, Miguel (2016). De Salamina a las Malvinas: 25 siglos de guerra naval (in Spanish). Spain: EDAF. ISBN 978-84-4143-700-5.
- Canales, Carlos; Rey, Miguel (2019). Naves mancas: la Armada Española a vela de Cabo Celidonia a Trafalgar (in Spanish). EDAF. ISBN 978-84-414-2879-9.
- Corbett, Julian (2007). England in the Mediterranean: A Study of the Rise and Influence of British Power Within the Straits, 1603-1713. Cosimo. ISBN 9781602062672.
- Fernández Duro, Cesáreo (2006). El gran duque de Osuna y su marina: jornadas contra turcos y venecianos (1602–1624) (in Spanish). Spain: Editorial Renacimiento. ISBN 978-84-8472-126-0.
- Hanlon, Gregory (2008). The Twilight Of A Military Tradition: Italian Aristocrats And European Conflicts, 1560-1800. Taylor & Francis. ISBN 9781135361426.
- de Groot, Alexander H. (1978). The Ottoman Empire and the Dutch Republic: A History of the Earliest Diplomatic Relations, 1610-1630. Universidad de California.
- Íñigo, Luis E. (2023). Vae victis: Una historia de las derrotas que sellaron el destino de la humanidad (in Spanish). Spain: EDAF. ISBN 978-84-4144-223-8.
- Linde, Luís M. (2005). Don Pedro Girón, duque de Osuna: la hegemonía española en Europa a comienzos del siglo XVII (in Spanish). Madrid, Spain: Encuentro. ISBN 978-84-7490-762-9.
- Rodríguez González, Agustín Ramón (2021). Lepanto, la batalla decisiva (in Spanish). Spain: Sekotia Ediciones. ISBN 978-84-1675-090-0.
- San Juan Sánchez, Víctor (2018). Breve historia de las batallas navales del Mediterráneo (in Spanish). Nowtilus. ISBN 9788499679365.
