= Francisco de Ribera y Medina =

Spanish naval commander (1582–1646)

Francisco de Ribera
- Born: 1582; Toledo, Spain
- Died: 1646 (aged 63–64); Spain
- Military career
- Allegiance: Spanish Empire
- Service years: 1603–1646
- Rank: Admiral
- Conflicts: Ottoman–Habsburg wars; Raid on La Goulette; Battle of Cape Celidonia; Spanish-Venetian conflicts; Battle of Ragusa; Eighty Years' War; Recapture of Bahia; Anglo-Spanish War; Cádiz expedition

Francisco de Ribera y Medina (c. 1582 – c. 1646) was a Spanish admiral and privateer. He was active in many of the naval wars of the Hispanic Monarchy in the 17th century, fighting variously Ottoman, Venetian, Dutch and English enemies.

He gained fame in the Mediterranean under Pedro Téllez-Girón, Duke of Osuna, defeating a vastly larger Ottoman fleet at the Battle of Cape Gelidonya. Ribera later moved to the Atlantic, where he led the Spanish naval effort of the Eighty Years' War with notable success, often in teamwork with the Dunkirkers. Although overshadowed in the sources by other admirals of his age, he was reputed to be a masterful naval commander, retiring undefeated despite his grueling career.

== Early career ==
Ribera lost his father at an early age, leading him to a low life in Toledo. He already intended to join the Spanish armies, but was forced to flee from Toledo after killing a man in a duel and wounding not fewer than five. He ended up in Cádiz, where he joined the Spanish armada under Admiral Luis Fajardo in 1603.

One year into its tenure, Fajardo's convoy defeated a fleet of the Ottoman Empire, and during its course Ribera had his first showing by capturing a Turk ship, which gained him Fajardo's favor. In 1605, he was part of Fajardo's expedition to Cumaná, modern-day Venezuela, where their 14 galleons captured 19 Dutch privateer hulks which had been harassing local Spanish trade. However, after being promoted to ensign, Ribera killed a captain in a duel, forcing him again to flee for another destination.

== Mediterranean fleet ==
He travelled to the Viceroyalty of Sicily seeking to join the Duke of Osuna, who was building a privateer fleet of galleons. Osuna was in search of captains, given that his main galleon expert was Jacques Pierres, a French corsair with experience in the Tuscan navy, under whom Spanish crews were unhappy to serve. Ribera was possibly mentored by Pierres in his first days in Osuna's fleet.

Osuna gave Ribera command of one of the 36-gun galleon San Juan Bautista. With it, he defeated a fleet of ten Barbary galleys from Tunis, after which he chased them to the Tunisian port of La Goulette and assaulted it, capturing four local ships. The battle saw Ribera promoted to captain, and among Osuna's best commanders, along with Ottavio d'Aragona. When Osuna was appointed Viceroy of Naples, Ribera and d'Aragona accompanied him as part of his entourage, referred to as the Duke's Bravos ("Brave Ones").

In July 1616, Ribera commanded a squadron formed by his flagship, the 52-gun Concepción, and five other ships, with a total of one thousand musketeers on board. At the Battle of Cape Gelidonya, his squadron defeated an overwhelming enemy force of 55 Ottoman galleys, leading King Philip III to promote Ribera to admiral for this victory, along with awarding him with admittance to the Order of Santiago. His next campaigns would be against the Republic of Venice, an intermittent ally of the Turks, against which Ribera obtained another major victory at the Battle of Ragusa.

In 1619, Ribera underwent a long campaign with five galleons to curb Barbary piracy around Sicily, Malta and Sardinia, capturing multiple ships and penetrating La Goulette twice to burn the local ships. In March, he chased a fleet of other five vessels from the Regency of Algiers, reaching two of them, whose crews blew up their ships to avoid capture.

In 1620, the Duke of Osuna was recalled to Spain. Ribera's last deployment under his orders saw him command ten galleons in conjunction with Agustín de Silva with six galleys, hounding Candia and capturing a dozen Venetian merchants. After Ribera returned to Naples with the merchants, Silva was cornered by Venetian admiral Federico Nani with eight galleons, losing his main galley but managing to escape with the rest.

With Osuna definitely demoted, Ribera was given command of the Sicilian ships. He was ordered to carry troops to Genoa, after which he leading yet another raid on La Goulette in August 1621 to destroy the local corsair ships. It was followed by another raid by Diego Pimentel later into the year.

== Atlantic fleet ==
In 1623, Ribera and his Naples Squadron, were transferred to the Spanish Armada in the Atlantic Ocean under Fadrique de Toledo, Marquis of Valdueza. The following year he could finally take possession of his habit of Santiago, as the process had dragged over the years due to Ribera's grandmother being found to be of converso blood. A special exemption in honor of his battle feats was decreed by Pope Urban VIII himself, an unusual privilege, which was ratified by Philip III. The king also granted Ribera lordship of Castilleja de la Cuesta in compensation for the delay. In 1625, Ribera participated in the Recapture of Bahia from Dutch forces, and shortly after in the defense of Cádiz against the English and the Dutch.

The following year, Ribera was stationed in Flanders as head of the Spanish Armada in coordination with the local Dunkirkers. His campaign dealt a series of blows to the Dutch navy, until then eminent. In October, Ribera commanded 12 galleons in an extensive privateer action, sinking over 140 Dutch fishing vessels near the Scottish coast. Along with a storm that scattered 20 galleons the Dutch had sent to blockade Dunkirk, the year heavily compromised the naval state of the Dutch Republic, which offered up to 40,000 florins as a reward for every captured ship based off Dunkirk, either Spanish or Flemish.

In October 1627, Ribera was required to assist Cardinal Richelieu in the siege of La Rochelle, sailing off with 14 galleons and 3 pataches, but he found that the English enemy had abandoned the siege, so he took a detour to engage in privateering. He was then called to relieve Gravelines, besieged by Dutch warships, which he forced to retreat with the help of Dunkirk corsair Jacques van der Walle. With his hands finally free, Ribera divided his fleet in two parts, commanding one of them and leaving the other under Jacob Collaert, and between them, the two sunk and captured over 90 Dutch ships. Ribera even took to privateering in front of English ports, taking some local ships, provoking the scandal of the Parliament of England and King Charles I.

In 1631, the Dutch armada planned a massive attack against Spanish trade, so Ribera and Charles of Bourgoigne, Count of Wacken readied their fleets in Dunkirk and Ostend. However, with the Dutch eventually aborting their plan, and thanks to Carlos Coloma's success at relieving Bruges, Ribera and the Dunkirkers came out again. In Autumn, Ribera assisted Dunkirker Michel Jacobsen in bringing a 24-ship convoy carrying a 200,000 ducats and 4,000 Spanish troops from A Coruña to the Spanish Netherlands. Wacken died the following year, but Ribera remained in his post until 1635, when tasked with protecting the Atlantic and heading a relief fleet to Pernambuco. He was replaced by Juan Claros de Guzmán, Marquis of Fuentes.

== Bibliography ==
- Anderson, Roger Charles (1952). Naval wars in the Levant, 1559-1853. Princeton University Press.
- Castro Rodríguez, Rafael (2024). Matanzas 1628: La captura de la flota de Nueva España de Juan de Benavides y Bazán. EDAF. ISBN 9788441442917.
- Echevarría, Miguel Ángel (1998). Flandes y la monarquía hispánica, 1500-1713. Sílex. ISBN 9788477370680.
- Fernández Duro, Cesáreo (2006). El gran duque de Osuna y su marina: jornadas contra turcos y venecianos (1602–1624) (in Spanish). Spain: Editorial Renacimiento. ISBN 978-84-8472-126-0.
- Canales Torres, Carlos; Del Rey Vicente, Miguel (2011). Naves mancas: la Armada Española a vela de Cabo Celidonia a Trafalgar [Missing ships: the Spanish Navy sailing from Cape Celidonia to Trafalgar] (in Spanish). Madrid: Editorial Edaf. ISBN 978-84-414-2879-9.
- Rodríguez González, Agustín (2020). Corsarios españoles. EDAF. ISBN 9788441440609.
- Sánchez Sánchez, Francisco Javier (2025). Francisco de Ribera, el almirante invicto. Renacimiento. ISBN 9791387552299.
- San Juan Sánchez, Víctor (2018). Breve historia de las batallas navales del Mediterráneo. Nowtilus. ISBN 9788499679365.
- Villiers, Patrick (2000). Les Corsaires du littoral: Dunkerque, Calais, Boulogne, de Philippe II à Louis XIV (1568-1713). Presses Universitaires du Septentrion. ISBN 9782859396336.
