= Galleass =

16th–17th century masted and rowed ship

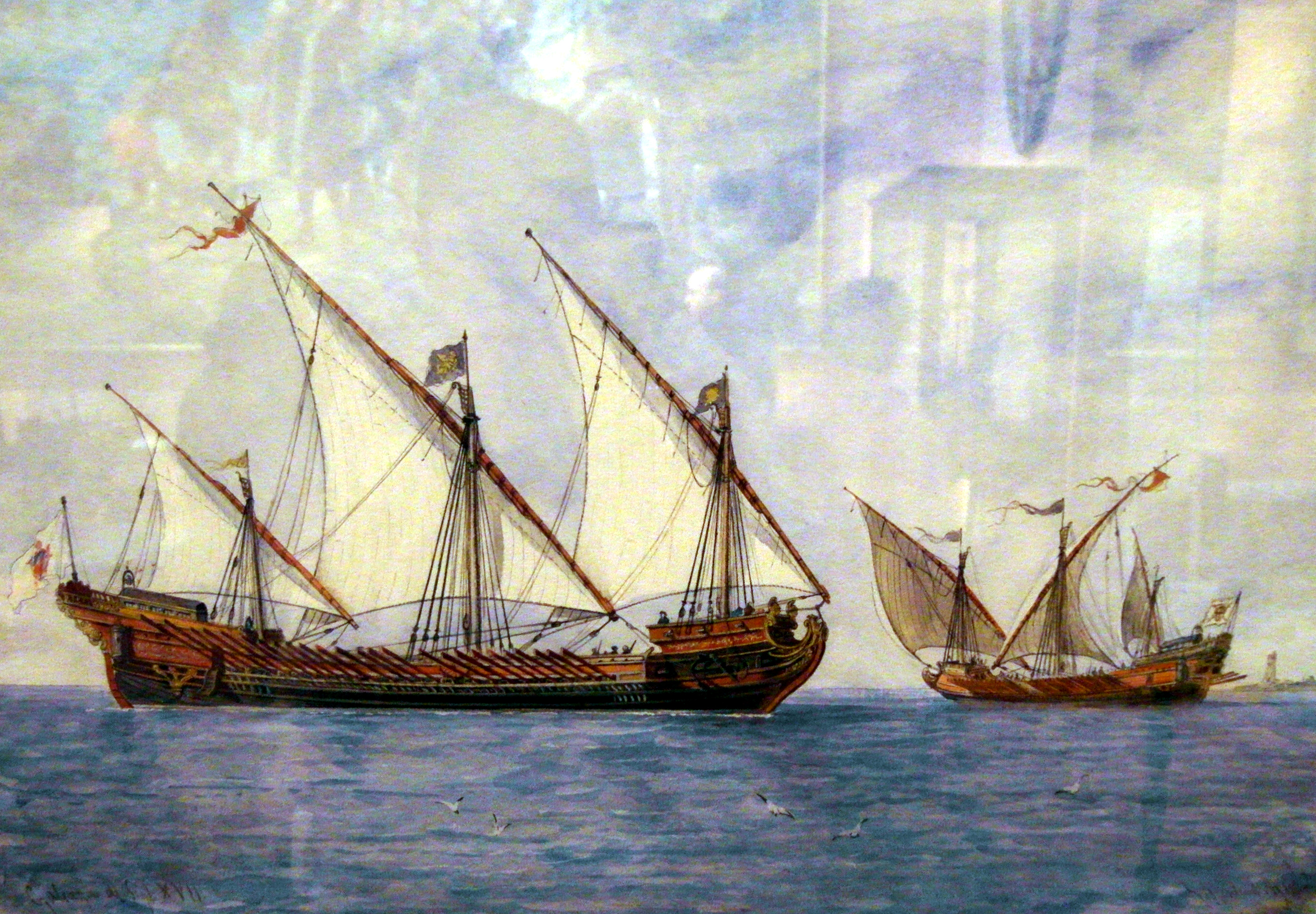
Venetian galleasses. Naval Museum of Madrid.

A galleass (Italian galeazza, Spanish galeaza) was a warship of the Renaissance that combined the sails and armament of a galleon or carrack with the propulsion and maneuverability of the oared galley. While never quite matching up to the full expectations for its design, the galleass was widely employed by the navies of the Republic of Venice and the Spanish Empire during the 16th and 17th centuries.

Distinct types of galleasses were developed concurrently under vastly different needs. Mediterranean galleasses were invented by Venice during the Ottoman–Venetian wars with the aim to overpower galley fleets, a model also adopted by Spain and other nations after their notable role in the Battle of Lepanto. In comparison, Atlantic galleasses were designed by Spain to outmaneuver sailing ships and protect their treasure fleets, eventually evolving into oarless galleons and frigates.

== Characteristics ==
The term "galleass" was also applied to any particularly large and heavy galley, but eventually came to mean a cross between a rowing and a sailing ship. Mediterranean galleasses were higher, larger and wider than regular galleys. They also differed in not having as high a length to beam ratio as the galleys, being limited to 1:5 compared to their 1:7. They had up to 32 oars, each worked by up to five men. They usually had three masts, and unlike galleys, proper forecastles and an aftcastles. Although fundamentally slower than regular galleys, much effort was made in Venice to make galleasses as fast as possible to compete with them. The gun deck usually ran over the rowers' heads, but there are also pictures showing the opposite arrangement.

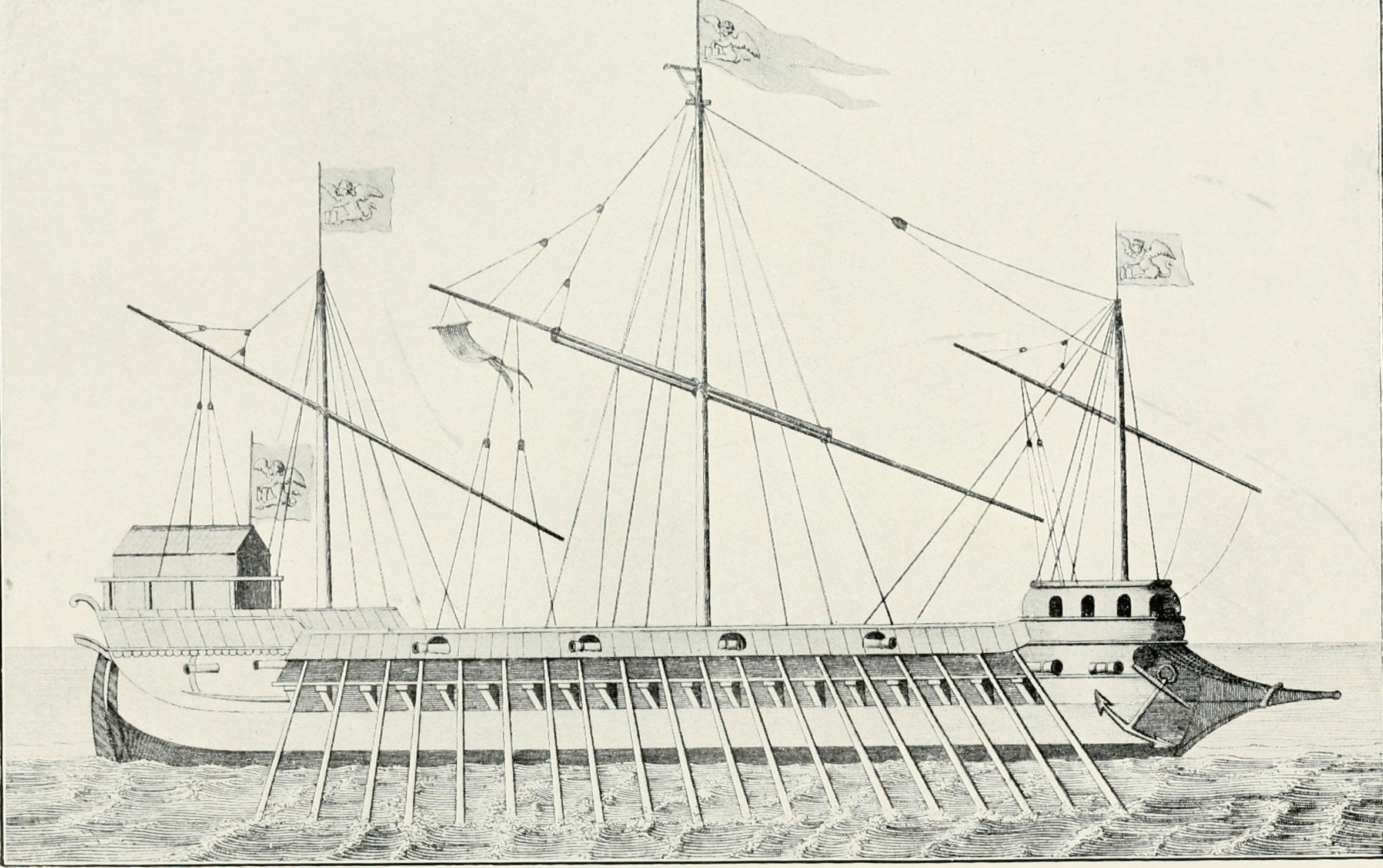
Galleass, from Heresies of sea power. 1906.

Galleasses usually carried more sails than galleys and had far more firepower. Compared to galleys, which only fielded a handful of guns on their prows and none on their broadsides, a galleass' artillery could carry 30-50 pieces of different sizes. Galleasses were also way more stable in rough seas due to their larger dimensions and higher freeboard. However, their reduced speed and maneuverability meant they needed to be supported by lighter galleys, which would tow them to assist their movement.

Atlantic galleasses (galeaza atlántica or cantábrica) were developed in parallel by Spain. They were crosses between galleys and galleons meant to be used in Atlantic Ocean, where they could hunt down sailing ships. Unlike Mediterranean models, Atlantic galleasses were designed primarily to move by sail, and would only deploy their rows to strategically turn or sprint. This allowed them a better maneuverability than purely sailing ships, while the increased size also allowed for superior firepower compared to Mediterranean galleasses. Spanish Atlantic galleasses could carry up to 100 guns of several sizes. A similar but smaller model was the galizabra, which combined traits of both a galley and a zabra.

The English and French also adopted smaller galleasses for their usage in the Atlantic. English galleasses were fitted with six to nine guns, generally small and interspersed between the row ports in the lower deck. They were used to escort the wings of a bigger fleet, and were meant to be supported themselves by pinnaces and even smaller galleasses called rowbarges.

Ottoman galleasses, created for the Mediterranean, were called mahon or mahona (from Arabic mahun, meaning boat). They resembled their Venetian counterparts, although smaller and with lighter armament, carrying usually 20 guns of different sizes, and served eminently as flagships and artillery ships. Mahons likely appeared in the 17th century, although the term was previously in use for oared transports, causing confusion in some sources.

== History ==
Some authors identify as galleasses the great galleys used by Venice during the Second Ottoman–Venetian War, forming part of their fleet in the Battle of Zonchio in 1499. These ships were described to be so advanced that the Ottomans could not replicate them yet, not even after capturing two in the Battle of Modon and towing one to Constantinople. The Ottomans also fielded two carracks with rows during the battle. Otherwise, the Mediterranean galleass is considered to have been probably conceived during the naval reforms of Cristoforo Canal, after the end of the Third Ottoman-Venetian War in 1540.

=== Development ===
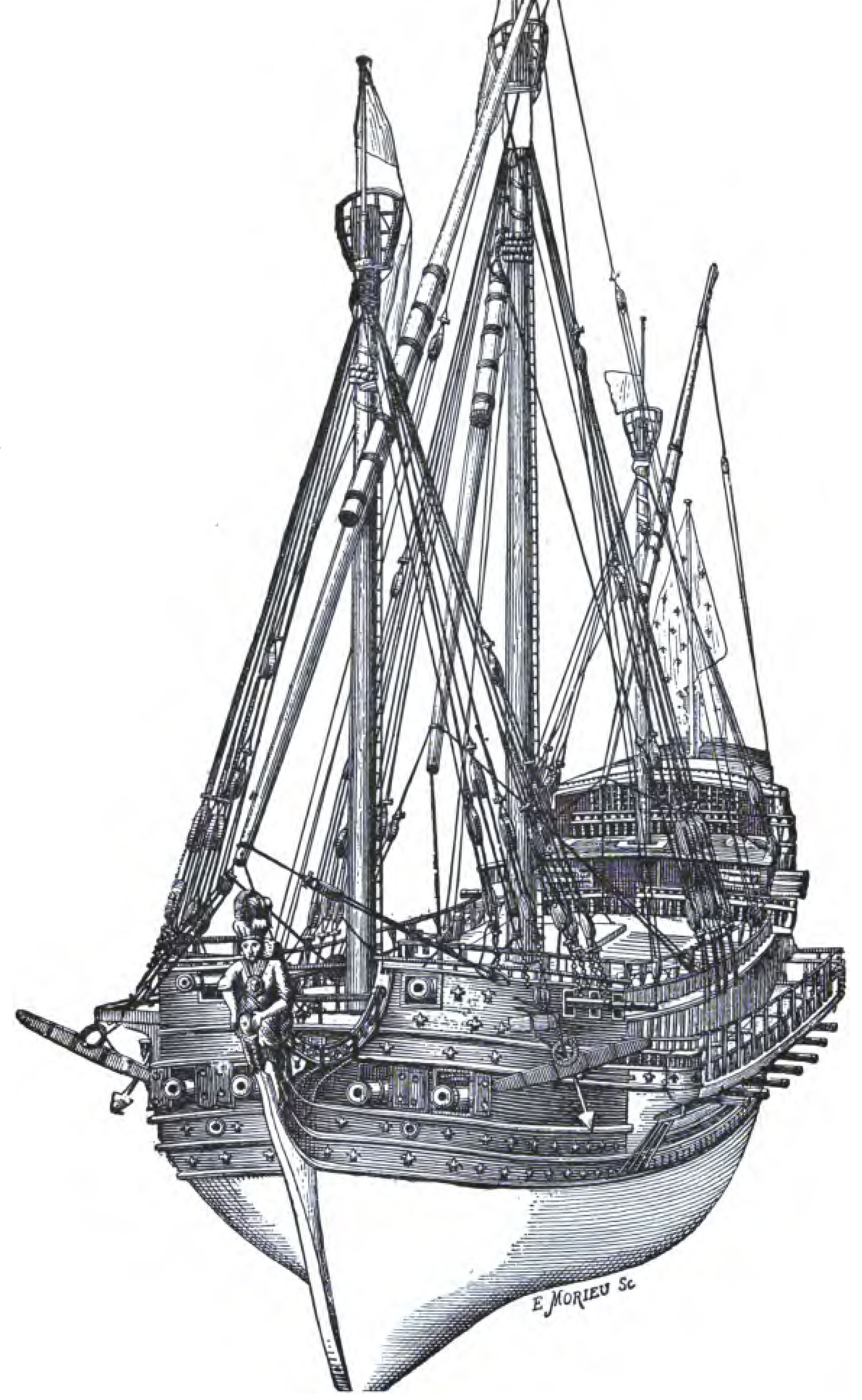
Galleass, from The Story of the Barbary Corsairs by Stanley Lane-Poole, 1890.

In 1526, engineer Vettor Fausto built and tested a large quinquereme, inspired by Hellenistic-era warships, to convince the Venetian Senate that heavy galleys could trump much larger fleets, especially in light of Venice's unstable position compared to the Spanish and Ottoman empires. His model influenced future galleasses, which were known as galeazze alla faustina ("Fausto-style galleasses"). Subsequent Venetian galleasses were based on existent models of great galleys (galea grossa) used to carry heavy loads for trade (da mercato). Great galleys had been traditionally used by Venice since the 13th century to carry the most precious goods and defend them from attacks, but by the 16th century, they had been gradually abandoned due to their decreasing profitability.

In 1540, Álvaro de Bazán the Elder built a private fleet in Biscay, including Atlantic galleasses like the 800-ton Santa María and the 1200-ton Santa María Magdalena, carrying 100 guns each. They were employed with great success in counter-privateering. Bazán also proposed to replace the sailing ships in the Spanish treasure fleets with galleasses of 200-400 tons, which would again employ sails normally and switch to rows when necessary. The project was rejected by a mix of political and logistic problems, so he repurposed the ships to escort the existent fleets, similarly gaining renown for their performance and reliability.

The English navy adopted galleasses around the same period. In addition to three prototypes built earlier, in 1543 they captured Pierre de Bidoux, Seiur de l'Antigue, nephew to French admiral Prégent de Bidoux, who offered his services as a shipbuilder to King Henry VIII against his former employers. He built nine galleasses for their use in the Atlantic between 1544 and 1546, including the six-gun Bull, the eight-gun Tiger and the nine-gun Antelope and Hart, depicted in the Anthony Roll. At least two others were developed by Scotland, yet captured by the English in 1544. English galleasses and rowbarges proved effective against French galleys during the Italian War of 1542–1546.

The first Venetian galleasses seem to have been built around 1550 over existent great galleys, probably as a response to the lack of mobility displayed by purely sailing warships in the Battle of Preveza. They were built secretly in the Arsenal, but were never used for war due to the great fire at the Arsenal in 1569, which destroyed them before they could be launched. According to Genoese admiral Andrea Doria, Venice had refrained from fielding these galleasses after finding them too impractical.

=== Popularization ===
Atlantic galleasses were also used in conjunction with carracks by Álvaro de Bazán the Younger to fight off pirates and privateers in the Atlantic, since these usually employed carracks and other sailing ships themselves, which could be rendered easy prey for galleasses in conditions of little to no wind. One of his captures in 1557 was a French galleass, the 19-gun, 200-ton La Crézen de Burdeos. However, with the end of the Italian Wars in 1559, Bazán was eventually required to redirect his efforts to the Mediterranean, where Ottomans and Barbary corsairs mainly used quicker galleys and galiots, leading him to replace his fleet by a similar squad of galleys.

In 1561, Pedro Menéndez de Avilés designed and built 230-ton Atlantic galleasses inspired by Bazán the Elder, which received the name of galeones agalerados ("galleyed galleons"). He formed a fleet of twelve, nicknamed the "Twelve Apostles", to protect the Spanish treasure fleets from French and English pirates and privateers, for which they exceeded expectations. However, their rows were eventually discarded as impractical when it was found out the ships would take water through the row-ports while rowing into the wind. Their cargo hold was also improved with an additional bridge. As a result, their model evolved into the galeoncete, a fast, lighter galleon.

Venice built a fleet of galleases again in 1564 by the hand of shipbuilder Francesco Bressan, using the hull of great galleasses which were added forecastles and aftcastles with heavier artillery. Their works were accelerated in 1567 with the worsening risk of an open war against the Ottoman Empire. The Grand Duchy of Tuscany also built two galleasses in preparation, although they lacked quality and were not fielded. Also in 1564, French admiral Gaspard de Coligny included a 200-ton Atlantic galleass in his expedition to Florida, where they built Fort Caroline. The settlement was destroyed by Menéndez de Avilés after one year.

=== Holy League ===
Twenty early mahons were among the Ottoman fleet of the Great Siege of Malta in 1565, probably referring to troop carriers at this stage. By 1571, at the start of the Ottoman conquest of Cyprus, Venice had twelve operational galleasses, which headed for Cyprus with the Venetian squad under the command of Girolamo Zane as part of the Christian relief fleet. Ottoman admiral Piali Pasha intended to fight them in Candia, but bad weather prevented it. Six of the galleasses were integrated in the fleet of the Holy League, under the command of Francesco Duodo. They would have their first battle in the Battle of Lepanto in 1571, where the Holy League's fleet under John of Austria would face the Ottoman armada of Müezzinzade Ali Pasha.

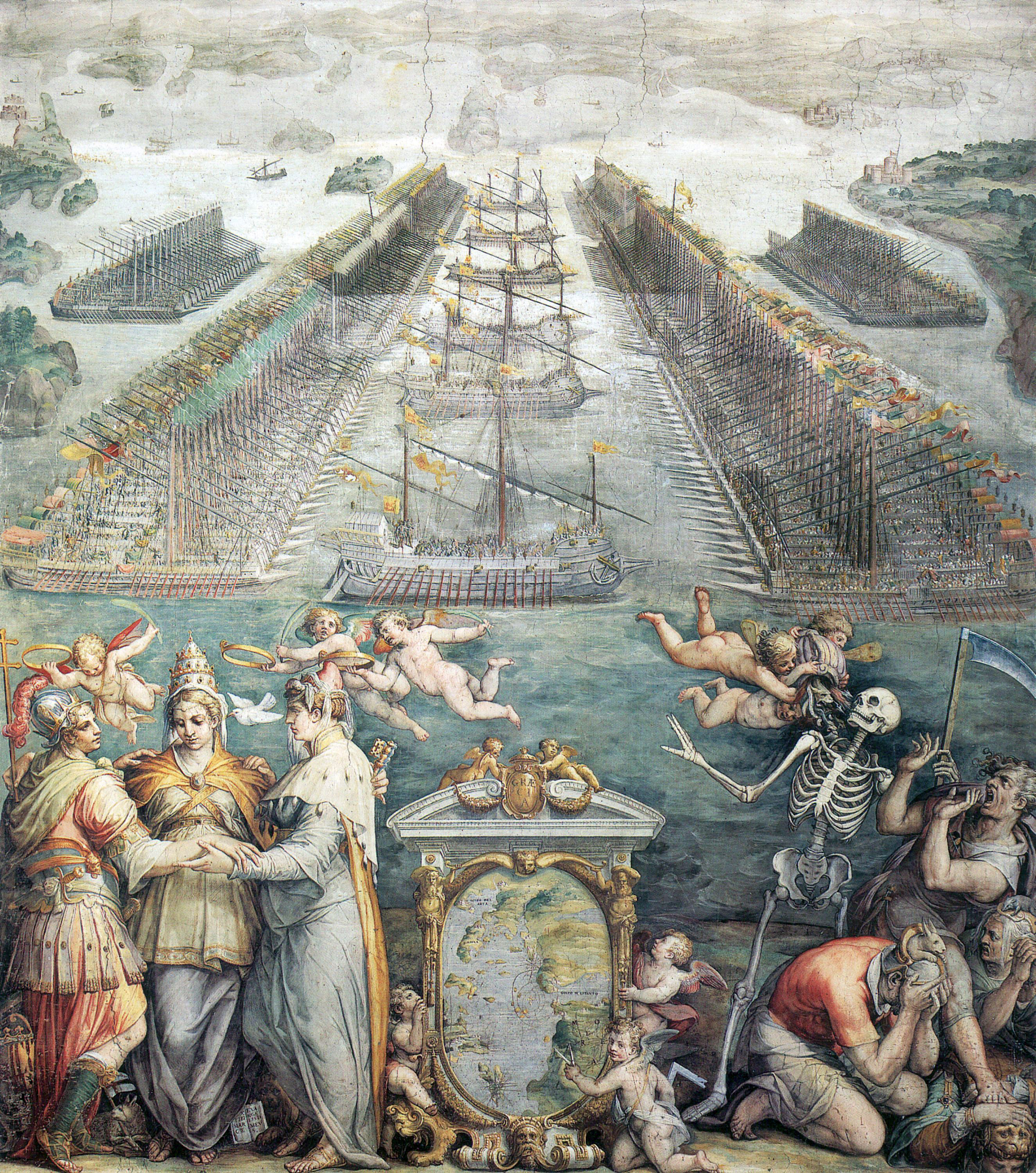
Orders of battle in Lepanto, with the six Venetian galleasses between the two fleets. Giorgio Vasari (1572, Sala Regia).

Due to contrary winds, the galleasses struggled to move towards their place in the vanguard, requiring to be towed by galleys into position. The two galleasses of the right wing had no time to be deployed or possibly fell behind. However, once there, their mass and artillery stunned the Ottomans, breaking the force of their attack. The galleasses also carried 500 Spanish arquebusiers each, which added greatly to their firepower. The surprise was multiplied because Ottoman navy had little knowledge of Venetian galleasses, believing they only fielded three artillery pieces like great galleys. It is also likely Ali Pasha and his lieutenants mistook the galleasses for supply ships or transports, therefore vulnerable to attack.

Recovering from the shock, Turks did not try to engage the galleasses directly, but divided their line and sailed around the galleases, opting to continue their advance and clash with the rest of the Christian fleet. This decision still compromised greatly the Ottoman advance, as the chaos of the maneuver, mixed with the high speed required to get away from the galleasses, prevented them to reform effectively until it was too late. For their part, the galleasses were left out of the battle, as the wind worsened their unmaneuverability and the chaos of the fight prevented them to fire from afar without hitting the Christian ships. According to some sources, only one galleass in the left wing could reposition itself to keep firing. However, their contribution had already cemented the victory of the Holy League.

After the battle, John of Austria congratulated Duodo for his role in the battle. After Don John wrote to King Philip II praising the ships, the monarch immediately ordered to build their own Mediterranean galleasses in his Italian shipards, intending that the Holy League could hopefully gather up to twenty of them. Bazán the Younger organized their construction in Naples in 1572. Venice similarly considered their ships a success, although admiral Giacomo Foscarini cautioned against including them in all operations, believing they would only encumber the fleet against an enemy who could not be forced or goaded into a frontal battle. The Ottoman Grand Vizier also ordered to build similar ships.

In June 1572, Marcantonio Colonna led another Holy League fleet in absence of John of Austria. He eventually found the surviving Ottoman admiral, Occhiali, leading a rebuild Ottoman armada which icluded six mahons. In the subsequent skirmish at Cerigo Channel, although severely outnumbered, Colonna arranged his galleys behind a line formed by the six galleasses and twenty galleons and carracks. Unwilling to face their heavy artillery, and failing to find a way through them, the Ottoman eventually withdrew. The encounter repeated days later, where Occhiali attempted to lure the Christian galleys away from the galleasses and sailing ships, but he retreated after having his left wing punished by artillery. John of Austria later arrived with the two Tuscan galleasses. After Don John conquered Tunis in 1573, Occhiali reconquered it with a fleet including fifteen mahons, which John did not arrive in time to fight.

=== War of the Portuguese Succession ===
In 1577, shipbuilder Cristóbal de Barros complemented Avilés' fleet with bigger models and galleons, designed to serve as flagships. However, Spanish Atlantic galleasses were falling out of favor and gradually evolving into conventional galleons. While powerful and versatile, vessels combining both sails and rows in the ocean were proving too complicated and expensive to build, especially compared to the new models of exclusively sailing ships. In 1580, Bazán the Younger and Barros accorded the new design of galleon, which would become predominant in the Spanish navy. Still, a galleass, the San Cristóbal, acted as flagship for Pedro Sarmiento de Gamboa in his expedition to the Strait of Magellan.

In an unusual reversal of this evolution, two Mediterranean galleasses built in Naples, the Capitana and the Patrona, were adaped to the Atlantic by fitting them with full rigging. They carried 50 guns each, making them imposing for their type. After the start of the War of the Portuguese Succession, they participated successfully in the conquest of the Azores in 1583 by Bazán the Younger, forming part of a division of twelve galleys, which possibly towed them if required. These galleys also towed the landing craft built by Bazán. Meanwhile, Alonso de Bazán built the first two galizabras in Lisboa the following year, the 200-ton Julia and Augusta. Upon discovering they could not house the required number of rowers and sailors, he enlargened them and rebuilt them in the form of galeoncetes with oars.

=== Anglo-Spanish War ===
In 1586, two other adapted galleasses, probably the Capitana and the Patrona again, were deployed again to escort the Spanish treasure fleet to Cartagena de Indias from possible attacks from English corsair Francis Drake.

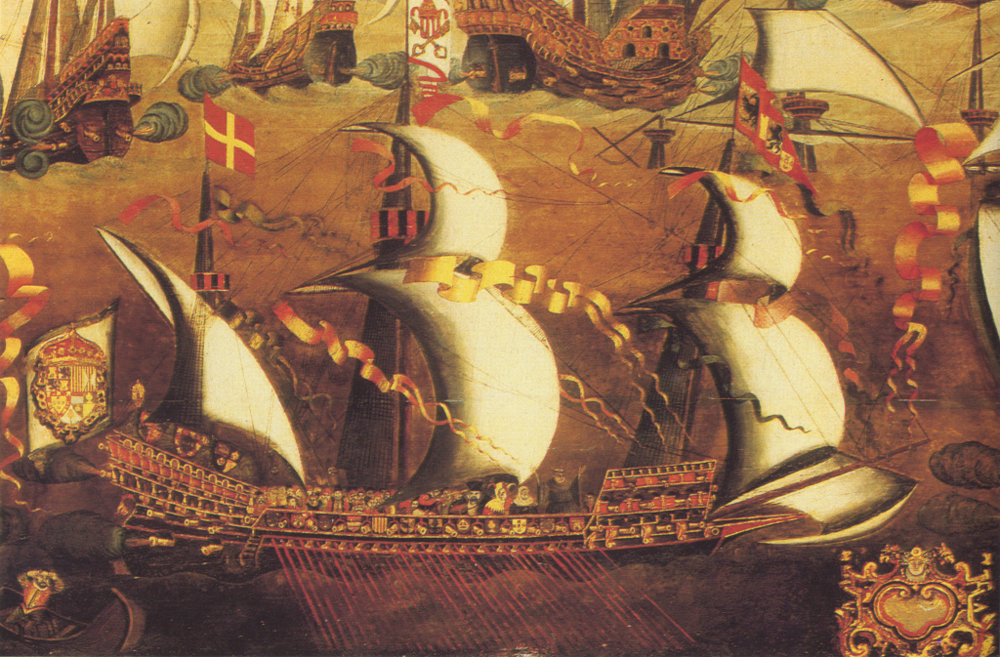
A galleass of the 1588 Spanish Armada, fitted with full rigging to navigate the Atlantic.

Several of these models were all part of the Spanish Armada in 1588, which featured eight galleons built by Bazán and Barros, the two galeoncetes built by Alonso and four 500-ton galleasses from Naples: the San Lorenzo, the Napolitana, the Zúñiga and the Girona, commanded all by Hugo de Moncada. However, the galleasses were crewed with too few rowers, and were also unsupported. In his original plans for the Armada, Bazán had pushed to have as many as 40 galleys in the fleet, but upon being refused, he asked at least eight of them so they could support the galleasses in pairs, which was refused again; only four galleys, which were also found out to be structurally past their primes, accompanied the fleet eventually.

With 50 guns, 300 soldiers and sailors and ability to move without wind, the galleasses were formidable vessels, being part of the front-line of fighting ships. During the course of the Armada, they were called to capitalize on any calm, rescue Spanish stragglers and cut-off stray English ships. However, they were slow and cumbersome, and their rudders proved defective. After the Battle of Gravelines, the San Lorenzo and Girona were then wrecked by the storms that befell the armada, with only the other two making it back safely to Spain. As a result, the galleasses and galleys were judged to be too fragile for the wild Atlantic weather, although it has been argued their number of rowers and subpar quality respectively played a greater role in their damage. The galizabras Julia and Augusta, in turn, proved seaworthy enough to survive the fiasco.

After the failure of the Spanish Armada, Philip II ordered to solve the design flaws on the galleasses, with Alonso de Bazán working on reinforcing the rudders in 1589. Two other Mediterranean galleasses built in Naples were added to the Atlantic armada in 1590. Also, after the victory over the English Armada the same year, ten more galizabras were built. In September, four galleasses and several galizabras were part of the fleet taken by Sancho Pardo Donlebún to carry the squad of Juan del Águila to Blavet. The galleasses helped conquering Blavet by bombarding the harbor from the sea, although two of them wrecked in the way home. This would be the last usage of Mediterranean galleasses adapted for the Atlantic by Spanish. Conversely, galizabras had proved their usefulness repeatedly, so they continued being produced and successfully fielded for coastal defense and escort of fleets, taking part in the capture of Richard Hawkins in the Pacific in 1594.

=== Later use ===
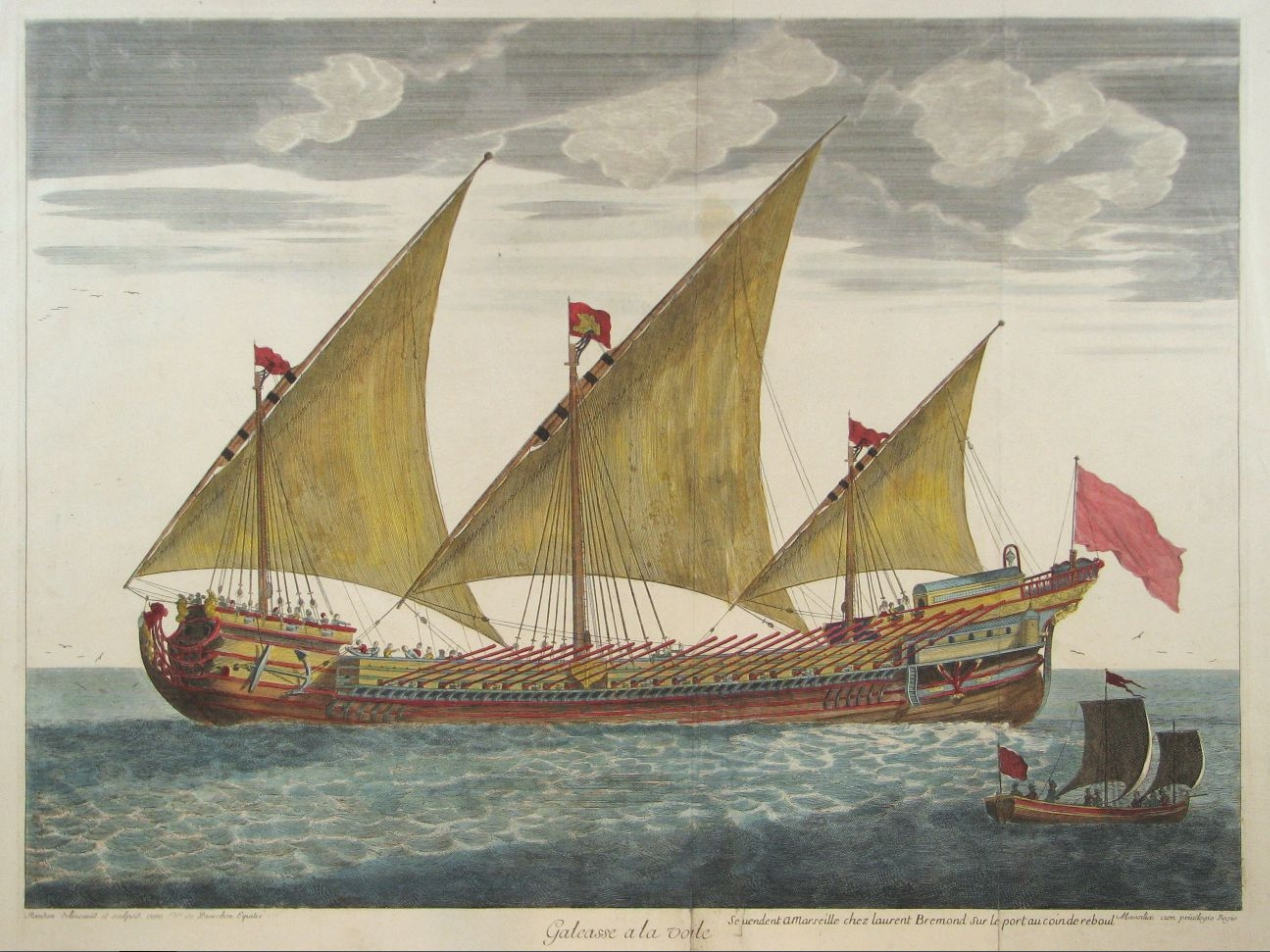
Galleass from Plan de Plusieurs Batiments de Mer avec leurs Proportions (c. 1690) by Henri Sbonski de Passebon.

Galizabras, increasingly known as a kind of frigates, lasted in service until being phased out early into the 17th century. By contrast, the Mediterranean, with its less dangerous weather and more fickle winds, galleasses continued to be in use as auxiliaries to galleys for a long time. In 1615, Pedro Téllez-Girón, Duke of Osuna built four heavy galleasses in Sicily in preparation of an Ottoman attack. However, events like the Battle of Cape Gelidonya, where six privateer vessels also owned by Osuna defeated a much larger Ottoman galley fleet, proved the value of sailing ships in the Mediterranean and initiated the general decline of rowing ships of any kind. One year later, the Venetian armada deployed six galleasses against Osuna's galleon fleet the Battle of Ragusa, with little success.

Despite these failures, the Venetian navy continued fielding galleasses, not only out of strategical custom, but also due to the political prestige achieved by those ships in Lepanto. They also improved their design so they could be significantly faster and nimbler. Around this time, the Ottoman Empire also built several fighting mahons.

Galleasses therefore featured at both sides of the Ottoman-Venetian War of 1645–1669. They were heavily favored by captain-general Francesco Morosini due to their capacity for artillery and low dependence on wind, which led to four to eight galleasses being sent every year to join the war fleet. However, Morosini's successors noted galleasses also combined the disadvantages of both galleys and galleons, being too slow compared to the former and too unstable for rough weather compared to the latter. Still, by the Morean War, the increasingly reduced Venetian navy invested mainly its resources in galleasses over quicker galleys. Charles Thomson wrote Venice was still using galleasses during his visit to the Venetian Arsenal in 1732, although noting they were the last western nation to do so. They were finally retired from production in 1755.

== See also ==
- Galliot
- Great ship
- Turuma

== Bibliography ==
- Abercrombie, Gordon Ellyson (2025). The Hospitaller Knights of Saint John at Rhodes 1306-1522. Pen and Sword. ISBN 9781399048026.
- Altolaguirre y Duvale, Ángel (1888). Don Álvaro de Bazán, primer marqués de Santa Cruz de Mudela. Huérfanos.
- Anderson, Roger Charles (1952). Naval wars in the Levant, 1559-1853. Princeton University Press.
- Cordero, Javier; Hernández, Ricardo (2011). Operación Gran Armada. Díaz de Santos. ISBN 9788499699653.
- Fernández Duro, Cesáreo (1895). Armada Española, desde la unión de los reinos de Castilla y Aragón, tomo I. Instituto de Historia Naval.
- Fernández Duro, Cesáreo (1896). Armada Española, desde la unión de los reinos de Castilla y Aragón, tomo II. Madrid: Instituto de Historia Naval.
- Lane, Frederic Chapin (1973). Venice, A Maritime Republic. Johns Hopkins University Press. ISBN 9780801814600.
- Loades, D. M. (2017). The Anthony Roll of Henry VIII's Navy. Taylor & Francis. ISBN 9781351546706.
- Mattingly, Garrett (1950). The Defeat of the Spanish Armada. Penguin.
- Olesa Muñido, Francisco Felipe (1968). La organización naval de los estados mediterráneos y en especial de España durante los siglos XVI y XVII. Tomo 2. Editorial Naval.
- Petacco, Arrigo (2005). La croce e la mezzaluna. Quando la cristianità respinse l'islam. Mondadori. ISBN 88-04-54397-3.
- Rodríguez González, Agustín (2017). Álvaro de Bazán: Capitán general del Mar Océano. EDAF. ISBN 9788441438033.
- San Juan Sánchez, Víctor (2018). Breve historia de las batallas navales del Mediterráneo. Nowtilus. ISBN 9788499679365.
- Stevens, William Oliver (2009). A History of Sea Power. Bod Third Party. ISBN 9783861950998.
- Valdez-Bubnov, Iván (2012). Poder naval y modernización del Estado: política de construcción naval española (siglos XVI-XVIII). Bonilla Artigas. ISBN 9786077588696.
