= Tarihi Kadırga =

Ottoman galley

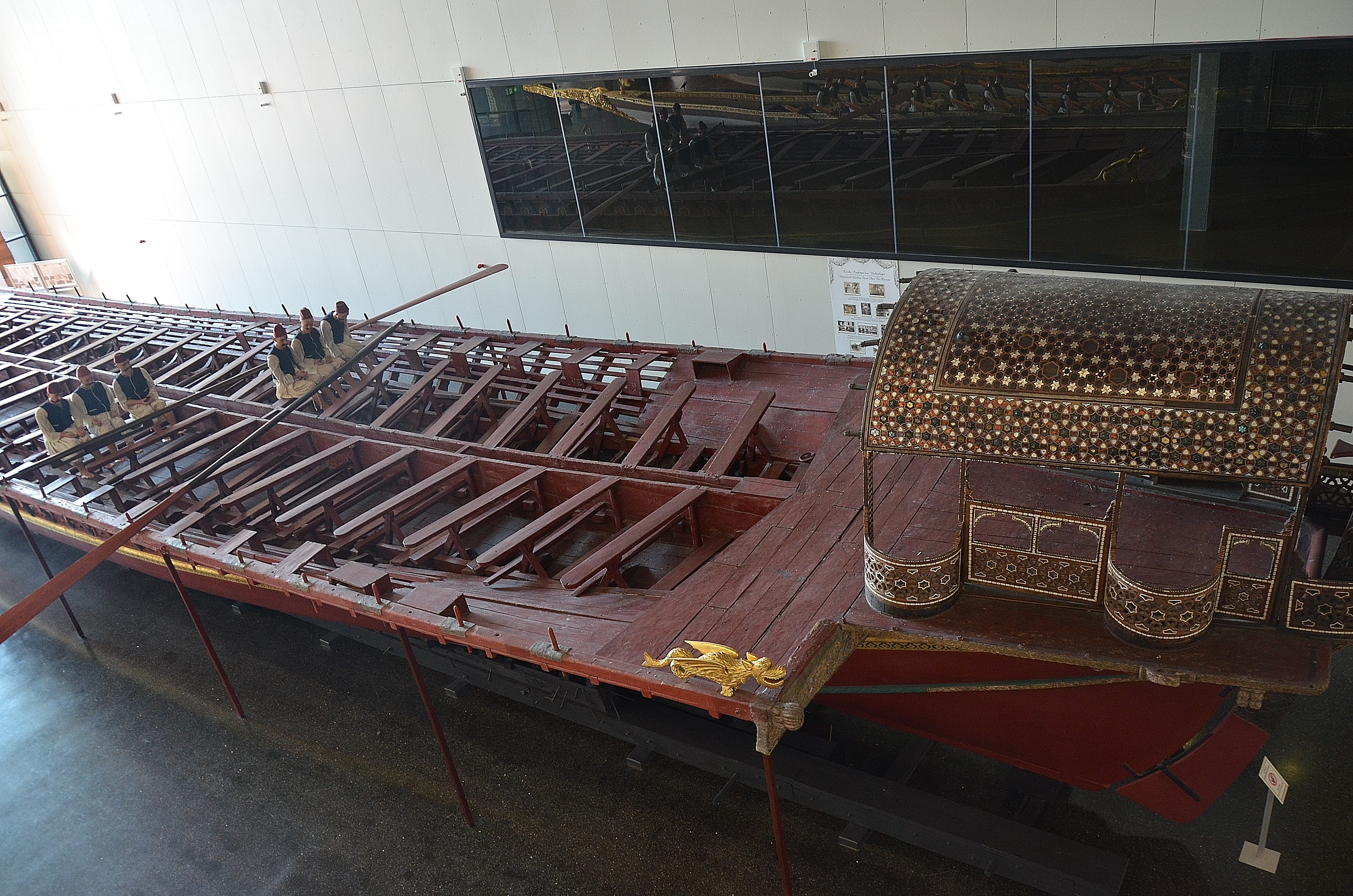
- Tarihi Kadırga at the Istanbul Naval Museum

History

Ottoman Empire
- Name: Tarihi Kadırga
- Builder: Imperial shipyard
- Decommissioned: c. 1839
- Status: Museum ship

General characteristics
- Class & type: Galley
- Length: 39.64 m (130.1 ft)
- Beam: 5.72 m (18.8 ft)
- Complement: 144 oarsmen

Tarihi Kadırga (Turkish for "historical galley") is an Ottoman galley constructed in the late 16th or early 17th century for the use of Ottoman sultans in inland waters. She is the only surviving original galley in the world, and has the world's oldest continuously maintained wooden hull.

== Design ==
Tarihi Kadırga has a length of 39.64 metres (130.1 ft) and has a beam of 5.72 metres (18.8 ft). She was equipped with 24 pairs of oars, and crewed by 144 oarsmen. She had two masts, (Note: Other sources state she had only one mast) but these have since been removed.

== History ==
Tarihi Kadırga's date of construction is unknown. However, it is presumed that she was built in Istanbul in the period between the reigns of Sultan Murad III (1574–1595) and Sultan Mehmed IV (1648–1687), as evidenced by AMS radiocarbon dating and dendrochronological research. The ship had a long service life, remaining in use until the reign of Sultan Mahmud II (1808–1839).

The first recorded mention of her dates from 1861, when the Istanbul newspaper Şehbal stated she was recorded by a French naval architect. In 1885, the ship underwent major repairs ordered by Sultan Abdulhamid II, in which decayed planks below the waterline were replaced, and the ship was refurbished. The galley was kept at the Topkapı Palace until 1913, when she was moved to the Imperial Naval Arsenal at Kasımpaşa.

By 1923, she was in a state of disrepair, with photographs published in The Mariner's Mirror showing damage to her lower strakes. However, by 1939, another photograph published in National Geographic Magazine showed her condition to have improved. The kiosk was restored in 1944, and the hull in 1950. During this restoration, some of the decoration on her hull was repainted by members of Istanbul University's Fine Arts Faculty. She remained at Kasımpaşa until 1956, when she was moved again, now to Beşiktaş, where she stayed until her final move in 1970. This time she was moved by barge to the Istanbul Naval Museum. She was given another restoration in 1982 and 1983, which included the replacement of decorative elements and repainting of the entire ship.

== Gallery ==
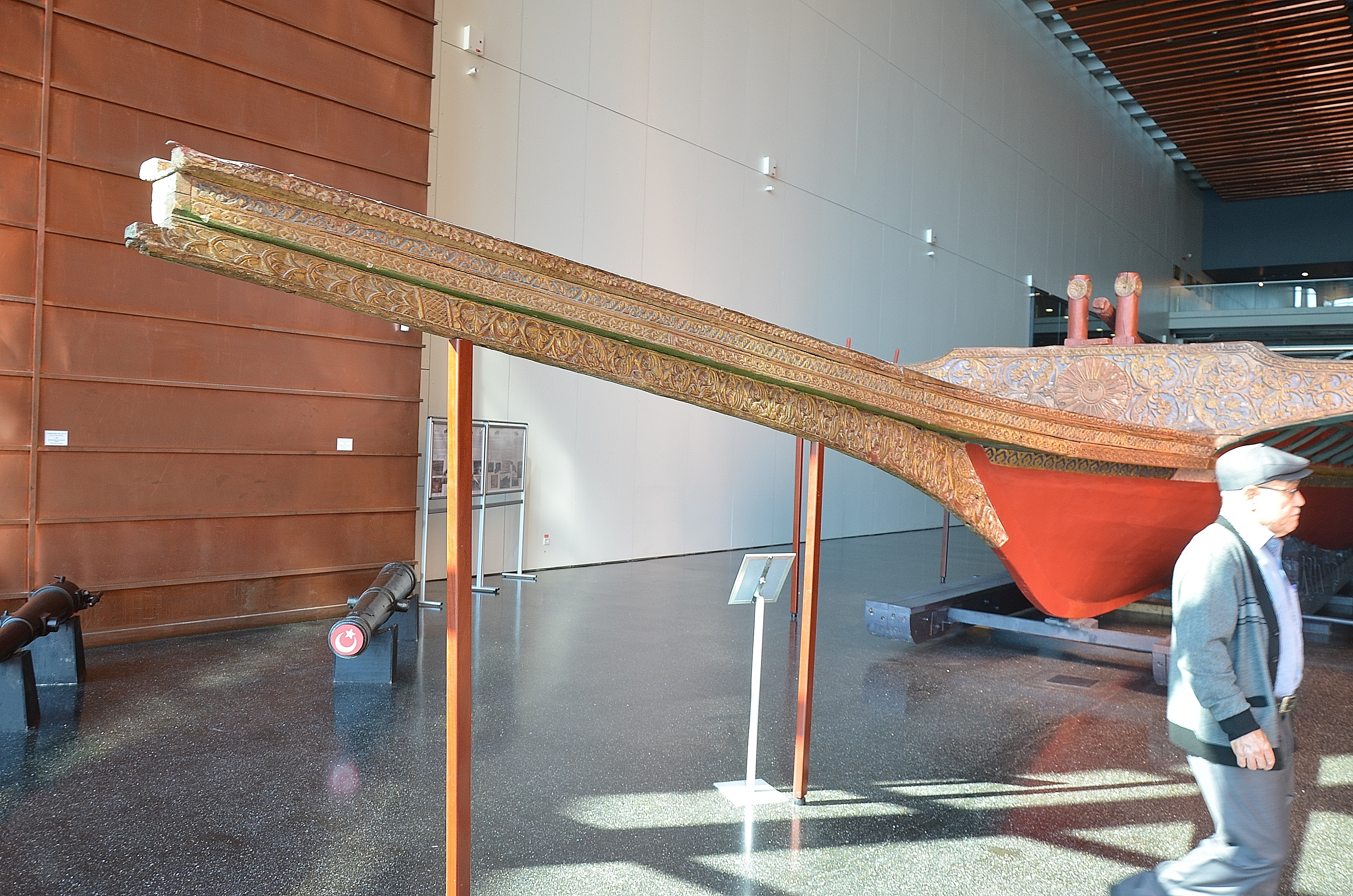
The bow is decorated with symbols such as star, crescent, sun, stylized leaves, and flowers

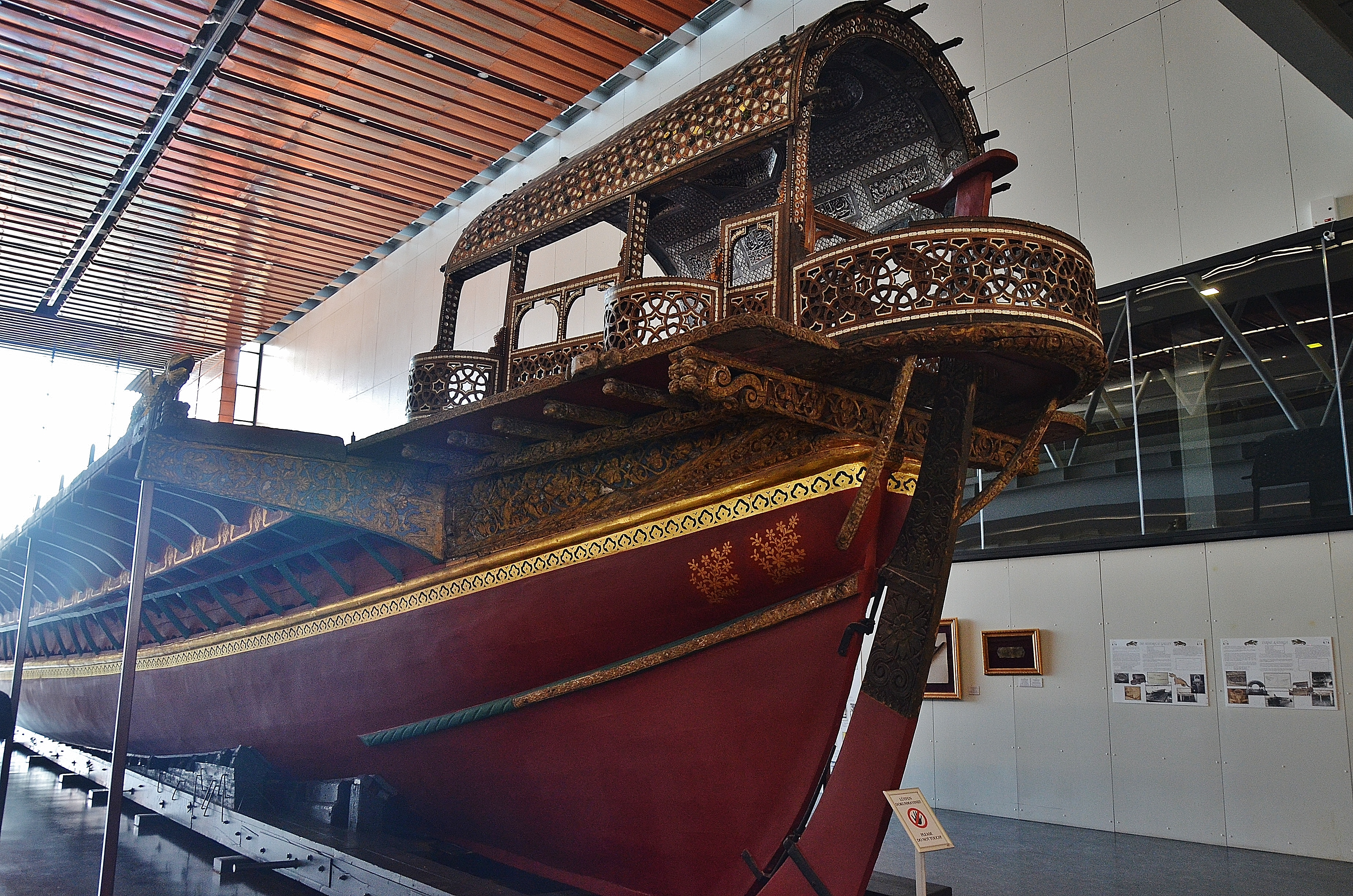
A view of the stern showing the ornamented kiosk

Rowers' benches

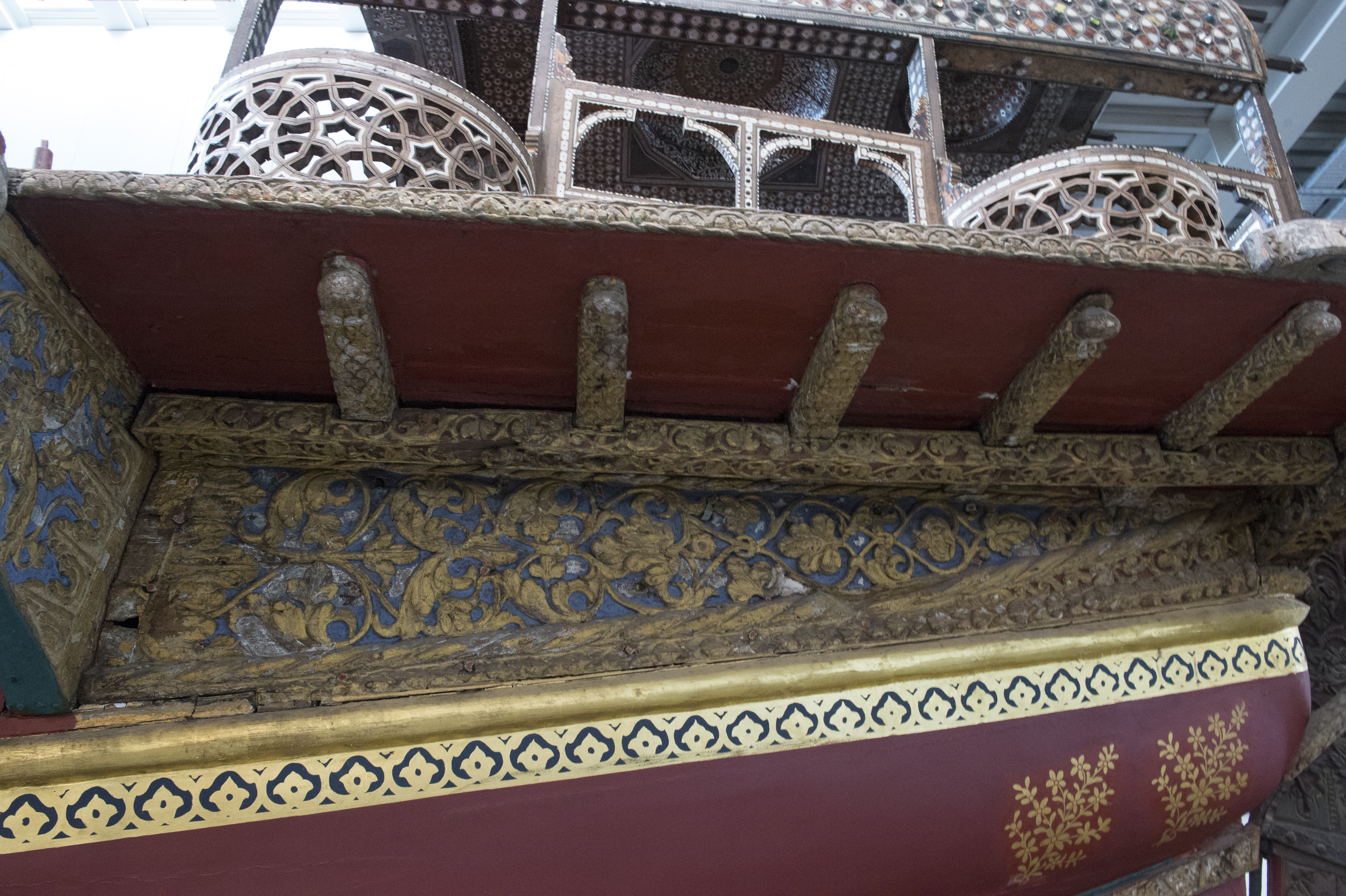
Close-up of the decoration under the kiosk

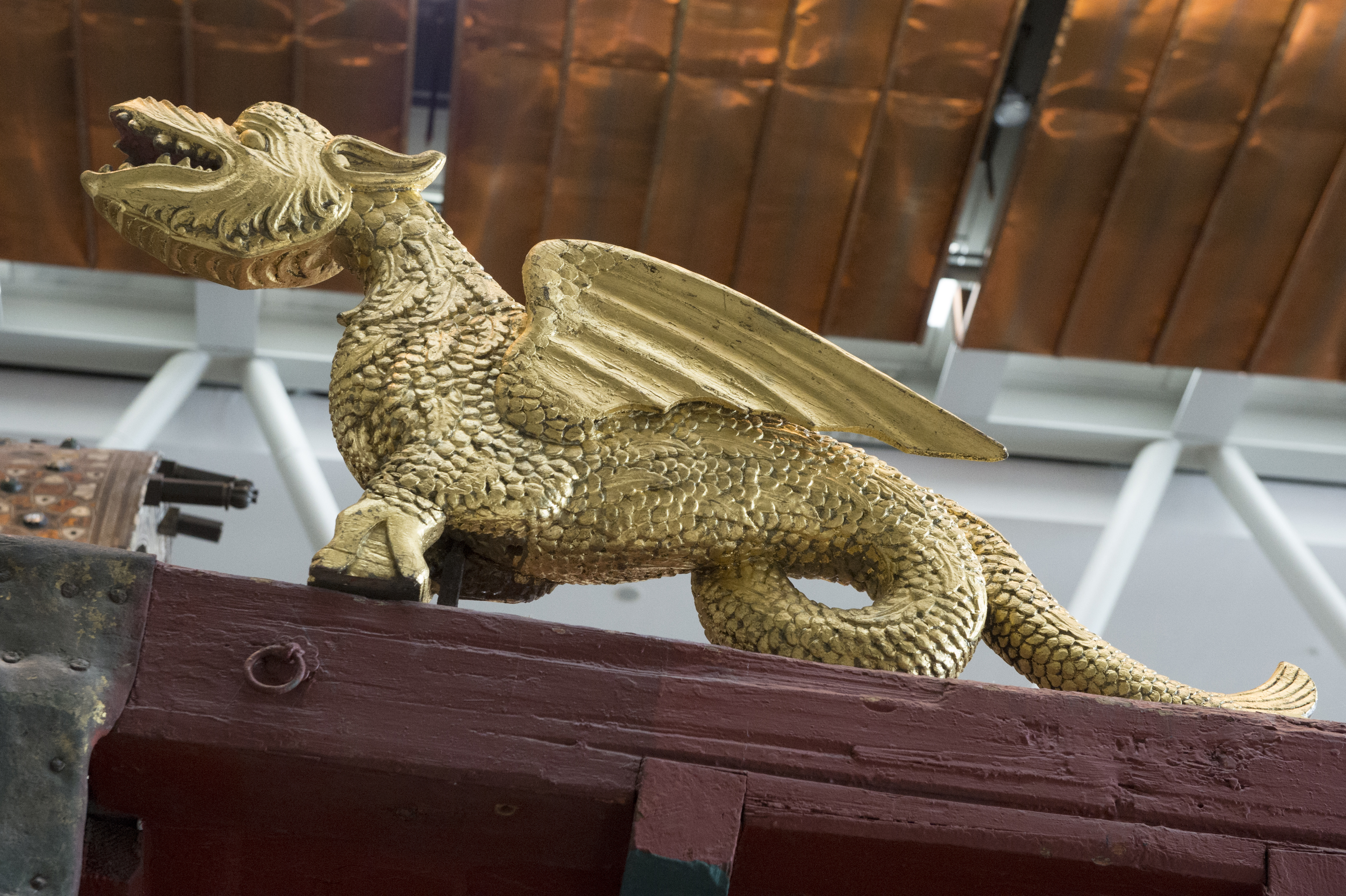
One of the two basilisk carvings

== See also ==
- Caramoussal
- List of sailing ships of the Ottoman Empire
