= Battle of Ragusa =

Naval battle between Spain and Venice

- Part of Venetian-Habsburg conflicts
Date	22 November 1617
Location	Ragusa, Adriatic Sea
Result	Spanish victory

Belligerents
Spanish Empire	Republic of Venice

Commanders and leaders
Francisco de Ribera	Lorenzo Venier

Strength
15 galleons: 1,600 land force	18 galleons 34 galleys 6 galleasses 16 barks

Casualties and losses
300 killed	4 galleys lost 4,000 killed

The Battle of Ragusa was a naval engagement in 1617 between Francisco de Ribera from the Spanish Viceroyalty of Naples and Lorenzo Venier of the Republic of Venice. It resulted in a Spanish and Neapolitan victory.

== Background ==
In December 1616, political tensions peaked between Spain and Venice due to the republic's alliances with Spain's enemies during the concurrent Ottoman–Habsburg wars, the War of the Montferrat Succession and the Uskok War, as well as their trade rivalry with Portugal, at the time part of the Iberian Union with Spain. Venice claimed exclusivity over the Adriatic Sea and harassed Spanish merchants, leading the Spanish viceroy of Naples, Pedro Téllez-Girón, Duke of Osuna, to order his lieutenants Francisco de Ribera and Ottavio d'Aragona to engage in unlimited privateering against Venice. Venetian merchant trade was disrupted, their ships were attacked and their allied ports in Zara and Espalatro were bombarded by the Spanish navy. Osuna ambitioned to destroy Venetian power permanently and make the Neapolitan city of Brindisi the new great Mediterranean port.

Venice deployed their full armada under the command of Justo Antonio Belegno. Although they managed to force Ribera and his way smaller fleet retreat, reinforcements by d'Aragona turned the tables, making the Venetians return home even if they still outnumbered their enemies. Belegno was later demoted and replaced by Giacomo Zane, who also avoided the battle. As Osuna maintained unofficial alliances with the Uskoks, the Venetian senate attempted to buy the services of the Ottoman Navy in their favor, but the Venetian fleet carrying their payment of 400,000 ducats was captured in route by the Spanish ships. Osuna also sent letters with the Ottoman Empire to further try to undo the alliance. However, Philip III's court was not favorable to the viceroy and preferred the peace obtained in the finished War of the Monferrat, so Osuna was ordered to cease his privateering and give back all the captured Venetian ships. Venice celebrated this result as a political victory and returned to its previous claims over the Adriatic.

In spite of his orders, Osuna was unwilling to drop his policy of aggression, especially given that Venice continued fostering Ottoman and Dutch presence, and threatened to resign when the court entertained to call all of his ships to Genoa. However, he eventually convinced Philip III to give back nothing and keep obstructing Venice under the Neapolitan flag instead of the Spanish one. On November 9, 1617, two months after the end of the Uskok War, Ribera came out of Brindisi with a fleet of 15 galleons to patrol the Strait of Otranto. After approaching the allied port of Ragusa, they were found out by the Venetian, who sent notice to their armada, led by Lorenzo Venier.

== Opposing forces ==
Ribera's fleet was composed by 17 galleons. It included the 50-gun flagship Nuestra Señora de la Concepción, with 200 men; the 31-gun Almirante with 150 men; the Santa María de Bisón, the San Juan Bautista, the San Pedro and the Nuestra Señora de la Misericordia, with 30 guns and 100 men each; the Nuestra Señora de Trapani and the Perla, with 24 gun and 94 men each; the Sansón, the San Miguel and the San Ambrosio, with 77 men and 20 guns; the Águila Imperial, the Diamante, the Nuestra Señora del Carmen, the Santa María de la Buena Ventura, the Tigre and the Mauricio, along which the patache Santiago.

Venier's armada was almost four times bigger, comprising 18 galleons, 34 galleys and six galleasses, as well as 16 Albanian barks. On paper, the odds favored heavily to the Venetian side, but their fleet had the disadvantage of being crewed mostly by conscripted merchants and foreign mercenaries.

== Battle ==
On 21 November, Ribera found Venier forming a large half moon with his armada. Despite the encounter, both fleets remained cautious and night fell with them still observing each other. Ribera was in a bad position, as the absence of wind rendered the galleons immobile while the currents slowly separated them, while Venier fielded galleys which could row freely against him and capitalize on the chance. However, Venier was aware of the reputation of the Spanish navy and marine infantry and opted to wait for daybreak. Ribera meanwhile sent captain Diego Duque de Estrada in a felucca to exchange messages between the Spanish ships and remind them they would be at advantage in case of being boarded. Duque was shot at by Venetian boats and his pilot was killed.

At daybreak of November 22, wind finally arose and allowed Ribera to reagroup his ships. Venier ordered his fleet to advance, but his flagship received fire and he ordered to turn back to the previous formation. Ribera then caught them off guard by chasing him in his own flagship, the Nuestra Señora de la Concepción, so quickly that the rest of Spanish ships could not follow him immediately. The Nuestra Señora entered deep into the Venetian formation, but Ribera had ordered his crew to hide and pretend the ship was unmanned, with the consequence that the Venetians believed it was some kind of explosive fireship and rushed to get away from it. In the attempt, the large Venetian fleet fell into chaos, which Ribera capitalized on to fire all of his artillery, causing much damage.

The rest of the Spanish fleet finally reached Ribera, formed in order not to be surrounded, and opened fire. The Venetian ships tried to resume formation and offer an effective response, but their attempts only disaggregated their fleet further and increased the effectivity of the Spanish artillery. Four Venetian galleys sank during the struggle, and their huge 60-gun galleon San Marcos, the biggest ship in both fleets, was peppered. Ribera sought to board the closest enemy ships, but the Venetian ships finally managed to turn and keep the distance thanks to the wind blowing in their favor.

According to Venetian accounts, afterwards Venier attempted to regroup his fleet and employ a new strategy, planning to advance with his galleys in the middle and the sailing ships in the wings to envelope the Spanish fleets. However, he found that his crews refused to engage again not matter how much he repeated his orders, and instead were content with firing from afar ineffectively. Finally, Venier gave the order to retreat in nightfall. The wind and darkness allowed him to abscond safely.

Upon the next daybreak, Venier surveyed the state of his fleet and called for a general withdrawal towards Korčula. Most of his galleys were either sunk or inoperative and many galleons were heavily damaged, among them the San Marcos, which had to be towed with great effort. They counted 4,000 casualties, in comparison to 300 in the Spanish side, where damage was minor. Ribera was ready to give chase, but a storm separated the fleets, forcing the Spaniards to head for Brindisi and the Venetians to do the same towards Manfredonia. Being unseaworthy due to the battle, 13 Venetian galleys and one galeass sank with the storm, adding up 2000 more casualties, while many survivors reached to Croatian coast only to be assaulted by Uskoks in retaliation for the events of the war. It took three days for Ribera to finally reach Brindisi.

== Aftermath ==
The Spanish victory was highly celebrated in Naples and Sicily. In Venice the battle's result was met with contempt and regarded a lost chance. Several commanders were demoted and Venier himself resigned from his post as admiral, being replaced by Pietro Barbarigo, although he returned to the post after the latter's death in 1619.

The battle's memory would be overshadowed in May 1618 by the alleged Bedmar Conspiracy, where multiple riots and executions happened in the republic among accusations that Osuna and other local noblemen planned to stage a revolt in order to take over Venice, using French and Dutch mercenaries who up to the point had been in Venetian service. Regardless of its veracity, news of the event spread across Europe and were fueled by the Spanish Black Legend. At the same time, Neapolitan aristocrats accused Osuna of planning his own revolt to separate from Spain and turn Naples into his personal kingdom, and this coincided with the breakup between Osuna and Ottavio d'Aragona, the fall of royal minister Francisco de Sandoval, Duke of Lerma, and the scrutiny of all the members of his circle, which included Osuna. As a result, the king called Osuna back to Spain and replaced him in 1619.

== Sources ==
- Anderson, Roger Charles (1952). Naval wars in the Levant, 1559-1853. Princeton University Press.
- Canales, Carlos; Rey, Miguel (2019). Naves mancas: la Armada Española a vela de Cabo Celidonia a Trafalgar. EDAF. ISBN 84-414-2879-4.
- Fernández Duro, Cesáreo (2012). El Gran Duque de Osuna y su marina: jornadas contra turcos y venecianos, 1602-1624. Madrid: Renacimiento. ISBN 9788484726944.
- San Juan Sánchez, Víctor (2018). Breve historia de las batallas navales del Mediterráneo. Nowtilus. ISBN 9788499679365.
