= Raid on La Goulette (1615) =

Spanish raid on Ottoman Tunisia

- Part of Spanish–Ottoman wars
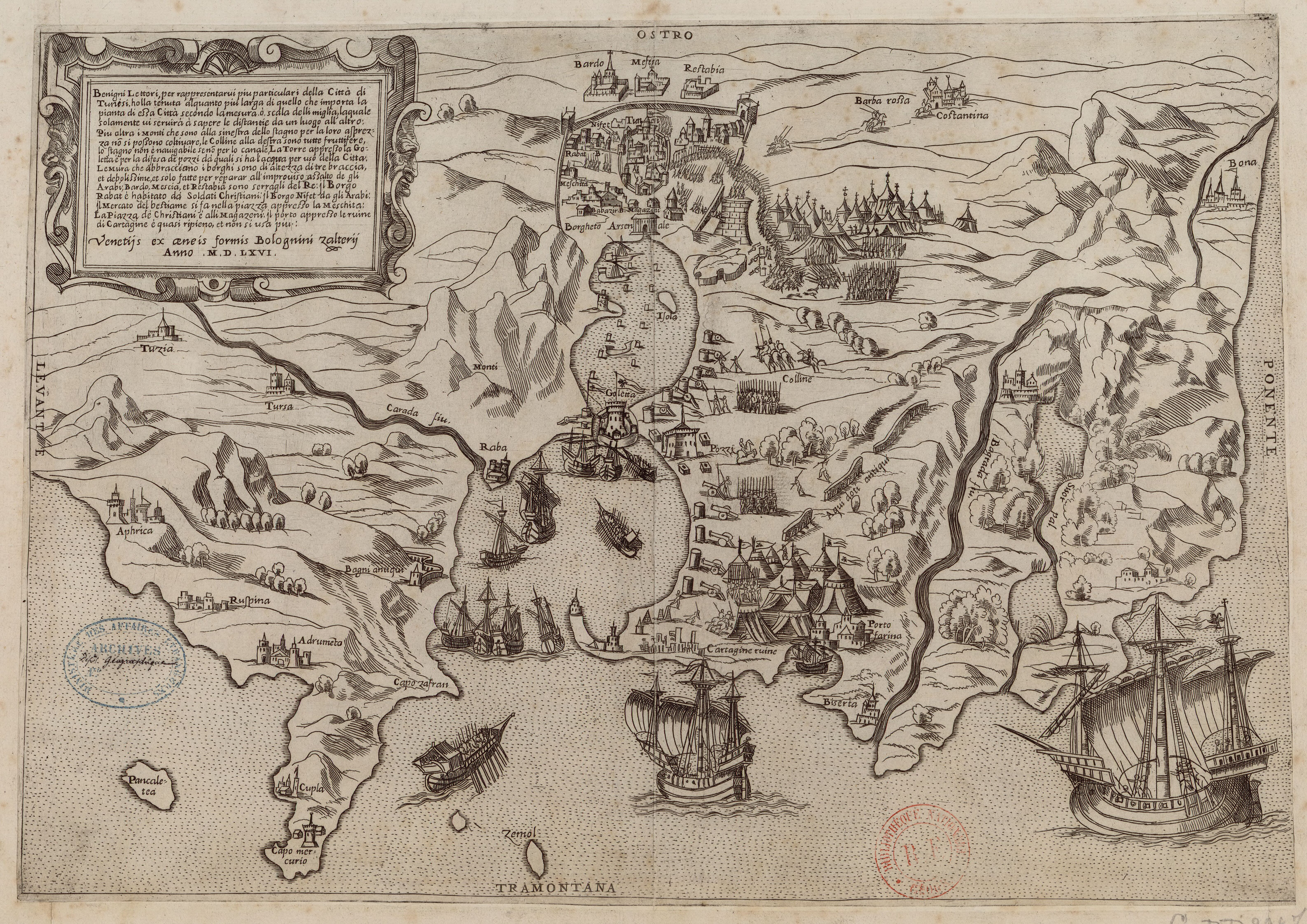
- Tunis and La Goulette, 1566.
Date	December 1615
Location	Halq al-Wadi, Ottoman Tunisia
Result	Spanish victory

Belligerents
Spanish Empire	Eyalet of Tunis; Regency of Algiers

Commanders and leaders
Francisco de Ribera	Unknown

Strength
3 galleons 1 tartane	19 armed ships

Casualties and losses
3 dead 30 wounded	4 vessels captured Several vessels damaged

The raid on La Goulette of 1615 was a naval attack by Spanish privateer Francisco de Ribera on La Goulette, the main port of Ottoman Tunisia. After chasing Barbary pirates from Sicily to La Goulette, Ribera approached their harbor and captured several ships before escaping.

== Background ==
While the Spanish court focused their Italian resources on the concurrent War of the Montferrat Succession, Osuna received the task of keep a watch on Muslim navies. In December, his ships discovered that the Ottoman Empire had concentrated 70 galleys in Navarino, near Morea, leading Osuna to mobilize the squad of galleys of Sicily, commanded by Pedro de Gamboa y Leyva. While his spy ships captured two Barbary privateers and sank four in the African coasts, Osuna sent Leyva in combination with fleets of the Knights Hospitaller and the Grand Duchy of Tuscany to carry supply for the Christian rebels against Ottoman rule in Morea.

In the way to Morea, Leyva captured eleven Turkish caramoussals and the flagship of corsair Azan Mariol, who was known for harassing Calabria. He rescued 150 Christian galley slaves and made 200 Muslim prisoners. However, upon being alerted of the activity of new Barbary pirates, Osuna sent in Ensign Francisco de Ribera, who had been recently given command of the 36-gun galleon San Juan Bautista, the first in a private fleet of sailing ships Osuna had started building that year. He also took with him a tartane, carrying 100 soldiers of the Spanish marine infantry and 80 sailors between them.

== Battle ==
Ribera found a suspicious African vessel and, after stopping it, had 60 soldiers to board it with the tartane and search it. Meanwhile, two other Tunisian roundships joined the scene, each carrying 300 men and 36-40 guns, and attacked the San Juan. Ribera fought for five hours inconclusively, as the Tunisians refused to engage in boarding themselves despite their advantage in numbers, until eventually retreating in nightfall. Ribera returned briefly to repair his ships from battle damage in Trapani, after which he sailed off again with two other galleons in order to capture the privateers.

Captured two unrelated pirates on the way, he headed for La Goulette after learning the wanted corsairs would have taken refuge in it. He attacked the port with only the San Juan and other galleon, leaving outside the other two ships for better maneuvering. Not less than 19 Barbary ships were in La Goulette, but the attack's surprise prevented them from reacting in time. Ribera captured two ships of 18-20 guns, among them the flagship of the Regency of Algiers, which was in La Goulette at the time. 37 enemies were killed on the deck, and the rest of the local crews jumped on the sea, where many of them drowned or were shot, except by three who were captured. Helped by favorable wind, Ribera left with the taken ships in two as theartillery of La Goulette rained on them.

The San Juan had received multiple hits, while one of the captured ships sank, having been more exposed to the enemy fire, but Ribera returned with all the rest to Trapani, with only 3 dead and 30 wounded men. 19 Flemish prisoners whom the pirates kept in the ships were freed. The ships in the harbor of La Goulette had been damaged enough the attack that no further action happened in a time.

== Aftermath ==
The action was celebrated in Sicily, with the Duke of Osuna immediately commending Ribera to be promoted to captain, which was granted, although the court refused to give him any further reward. The court's displeasure came from considering the operation an act of privateering, which had been explicitly forbidden in 1615 on moral principles despite Osuna's notorious success at it. Spanish poet Luis Vélez de Guevara recorded the battle celebratorily in his theater play about Ribera and Osuna, El asombro de Turquía y valiente toledano.

== Bibliography ==
- Anderson, Roger Charles (1952). Naval wars in the Levant, 1559-1853. Princeton University Press.
- Canales, Carlos; Rey, Miguel (2016). De Salamina a las Malvinas: 25 siglos de guerra naval. EDAF. ISBN 9788441437005.
- Fernández Duro, Cesáreo (2006). El gran duque de Osuna y su marina: jornadas contra turcos y venecianos (1602–1624) (in Spanish). Spain: Editorial Renacimiento. ISBN 978-84-8472-126-0.
