= Caramoussal =

- Type: Merchant and naval ship
- Place of origin: Turkey

Specifications
- Length: ~13 m (42 ft 8 in)

A Caramoussal (from Turkish: karamürsel) is a high-pooped historical trading and naval ship of the Ottoman Navy. They were particularly active in the 17th century Ottoman Empire.

== History ==
They were started to be built during the period of the first Ottoman Kapudan Pasha, Karamürsel Bey, in the dockyard of the town of Karamürsel. In the early periods they were only used in the Marmara Sea. Later in 15th and 16th centuries, a new type of ship was designed with the same name, and was largely used in transportation and shipping, as well as in the fleet of light ships. They were approximately 13m long, being the smallest of Ottoman galley type vessels.

== See also ==
- Tarihi Kadırga
