= Agustín Rodríguez González =

Spanish naval historian

Agustín Ramón Rodríguez González (born 1955), also known as Agustín Rodríguez González and Agustín R. Rodríguez González, is a Spanish historian and writer. He specializes in the Spanish Navy and the naval warfare of the Spanish Empire, about which he has published 42 works. He is a graduate of the Complutense University of Madrid in and a member of the Royal Academy of History. He is considered one of the leading authorities of Spanish naval history.

== Biography ==
He graduated in geography and history in the Complutense University in 1981 and got his doctorate in 1986. In 2016 he won the Premio Algaba de Historia for his homonymous book about Antonio Barceló. He later covered Spanish scientific expeditions, such as that of Andrés de Urdaneta. In 2025 he addressed the Black Legend of the Spanish navy throughout history.

== Bibliography ==
- La leyenda negra de la Armada española, La esfera de los libros, 2025
- Urdaneta y el Tornaviaje. El descubrimiento de la ruta marítima que cambió el mundo, La esfera de los libros, 2021, ISBN 9788491649878
- Corsarios españoles, Madrid, EDAF, 2020, ISBN 978-84-414-4056-2.
- El león contra la jauría: batallas y campañas navales española, 1640-1700, Málaga, Salamina, 2019, ISBN 9788494989162.
- Barcos con Honra. Las campañas de la Armada de Isabel II. Zaragoza, HRM ediciones, 2019, ISBN 978-84-17859-04-6.
- La primera vuelta al mundo, Madrid, Edaf, 2018, ISBN 978-84-414-3883-5.
- El león contra la jauría: batallas y campañas navales españolas, 1621-1640, Málaga, Salamina, 2018, ISBN 978-84-948-2243-8.
- Señores del mar: los grandes y olvidados capitanes de la Real Armada, Madrid, La Esfera de los Libros, 2018, ISBN 978-84-9164-224-4.
- Álvaro de Bazán: Capitán General del Mar Océano, Madrid, Edaf, 2017, ISBN 978-84-414-3779-1.
- España frente a Chile y Perú: la campaña del Pacífico, 1862-1871, Madrid, Real del Catorce Editores, 2016, ISBN 978-84-944156-6-1.
- Tramas ocultas de la guerra del 98, Madrid, Actas, 2016, ISBN 978-84-9739-164-1.
- Antonio Barceló: mucho más que un corsario, Madrid, Edaf, 2016, ISBN 978-84-414-3701-2.
- Españoles en la mar y en ultramar, Sekotia, Madrid, 2016, ISBN 978-84-16412-81-5.
- Pioneros españoles del submarino, Editorial Galland Books, Valladolid, 2015, ISBN 978-84-16200-14-6.
- Otras victorias por mar de los españoles, Madrid, Sekotia, 2014, ISBN 978-84-941829-1-4.
- Jaime Janer Robinson: Ciencia y Técnica para la reconstrucción de la Armada, Madrid, Navalmil, 2012, 141 págs. ISBN 978-84-940845-0-8.
- Drake y la Invencible: mitos desvelados, Madrid, Sekotia, 2011, ISBN 978-84-96899-75-9.
- La reconstrucción de la Escuadra: planes navales españoles 1898-1920, Madrid, Galland Books, 2010, ISBN 978-84-15043-065.
- La guerra de Melilla de 1893, Madrid, Almena, 2008, ISBN 978-84-96170-94-0.
- Galeras españolas: del Egeo al Mar de la China, Barcelona, Navantia, 2007, DL: B-52663-2007.
- Victorias por mar de los españoles, Editorial Grafite, Madrid, 2006, ISBN 84-96281-38-8.
- Trafalgar y el conflicto naval angloespañol del siglo XVIII, San Sebastián de los Reyes, Actas, 2005, ISBN 84-9739-052-0.
- Lepanto, la batalla que salvó a Europa, reedited as Lepanto, la batalla decisiva, Editorial Grafite, Madrid-Bilbao, 2004, ISBN 84-96281-16-7.
- La Campaña del Pacífico (1862-1871). España frente a Chile y Perú, Agualarga, Madrid, 1999. ISBN 84-95088-90-8.
- El impacto de las crisis coloniales en las relaciones hispano-portuguesas (1890-1898), Mérida, UNED, 1998, Colección Cuadernos de estudio luso-españoles n.º 3, ISBN 84-88861-67-2.
- La caída de Manila en 1898. Estudios en torno a un informe consular, Asociación de Estudios del Pacífico, Madrid, 1998, Monografías de la Revista Española del Pacífico, n.º 2, DL M 32754-1997.
- Operaciones de la guerra de 1898, una revisión crítica, Actas, Madrid, 1998, ISBN 84-87863-72-8.
- En la estela de Colón. Carabelas y singladuras del capitán Etayo, Actas, Madrid. 1998, ISBN 84-605-8073-3.
- La guerra del 98. Las campañas de Cuba, Puerto Rico y Filipinas, Agualarga, Madrid, 1998, ISBN 84-88959-91-5.
- El desastre naval de 1898, Madrid, Arco Libros, 1997, Colección Cuadernos de Historia n.º 44, ISBN 84-7635-276-X.
- Cosme García: un genio olvidado, Logroño, Instituto de Estudios Riojanos, 1996, Colección Logroño, 19, ISBN 84-89362-16-5.
- Isaac Peral, historia de una frustración, Ayuntamiento de Cartagena y Caja Murcia, 1993, ISBN 84-87529-21-6.
- Antoni Barceló, Edicions de Nou Art Thor, Barcelona, 1990, Colección Gent nostra n.º 85. ISBN 84-7327-217-X.
- Las relaciones internacionales tras la Segunda Guerra Mundial, Torrejón de Ardoz (Madrid), Akal, 1989, Colección Akal historia del mundo contemporáneo n.º 26. ISBN 84-7600-198-3.
- La Segunda Guerra Mundial: II. La guerra en el Pacífico, Torrejón de Ardoz (Madrid), Akal, 1988, Colección Akal Historia del Mundo n.º 25, ISBN 84-7600-395-1.
- La Segunda Guerra Mundial: I La Guerra en Europa, Torrejón de Ardoz, (Madrid), Akal, 1988, 2.ª ed. 1995. Colección Akal historia del mundo contemporáneo n.º 24. ISBN 84-7600-281-5.
- Política Naval de la Restauración, 1875-1898, Madrid, San Martín, 1988. Prólogo de D. José María Jover Zamora, de la Real Academia de la Historia. 522 págs. ISBN 84-7140-257-2.
