= Víctor San Juan =

Víctor M. San Juan Sánchez (Madrid, 1963–2020) was a Spanish naval historian, engineer and boat racer. He wrote over 30 books of both fiction and non-fiction about the naval history of Spain. His list of awards included two Nostromo awards, a bronze medal by the Fundación Letras del Mar, and an honor induction in the Premios Robinson de Historia Naval.

== Biography ==
San Juan graduated as an engineer, participating in the building of the high-speed rail in Spain. He was simultaneously a boat racer with over 140 races in the Atlantic and Mediterranean. His main field was his work as a novelist and naval historian, which earned him being appointed knight by the Federación Española de Ligas Navales in 2018, among several other marks of distinction. In 2001 he won the fifth Nostromo literary award for his novel Pequeño Escota, named after his own yacht, and in 2011 won it again for his novel Indiamen. In 2006 he won the San Telmo bronze medal for his novel Trafalgar, tres armadas en combate, published in the 200th anniversary year of the eponymous battle.

He died in 2020 at 57 years old.

== Awards ==
- Premio Nostromo de literatura náutica (2001)
- San Telmo bronze medal by the Fundación Letras de la Mar (2006)
- Premio Nostromo de literatura náutica (2011)
- Accesit in the Premios Robinson de Historia Naval

== Bibliography ==
=== Non-fiction ===
- Trafalgar, tres armadas en combate (2005)
- La batalla naval de las Dunas: La Holanda comercial contra la España del Siglo de Oro (2007), Sílex, ISBN 978-8477371847
- Piratas de todos los tiempos (2009), Sílex, ISBN 978-84-7737-220-2
- Barcos desaparecidos y su misterio (2012), Sílex, ISBN 978-8477375982
- 22 derrotas navales británicas (2014), Navalmil, ISBN 978-84-940845-8-4
- Tolón; batalla tras resurgir de las cenizas (2014)
- El Titanic y otros grandes naufragios (2014), Nowtilus, ISBN 978-8499676357
- La armada desconocida de Jorge Juan (2015), Nowtilus, ISBN 978-84-1305-464-3
- Grandes batallas navales desconocidas (2016), Nowtilus, ISBN 978-84-9967-820-7
- Extraños sucesos navales (2016), Nowtilus, ISBN 978-84-9967-779-8
- 22 derrotas navales de los franceses (2017), Náutica Robinson
- Breve historia de las batallas navales de la Edad Media (2017), Nowtilus, ISBN 978-84-9967-874-0
- Breve historia de la Armada Invencible (2017), Nowtilus, ISBN 978-84-9967-847-4
- Breve historia de las batallas navales del Mediterráneo (2018), Nowtilus, ISBN 978-84-9967-934-1
- Breve historia de las batallas navales de los acorazados (2018), Nowtilus, ISBN 978-84-9967-987-7
- Breve historia de las batallas navales de las fragatas (2019), Nowtilus, ISBN 978-84-1305-074-4
- Breve historia de los trasatlánticos (2019), Nowtilus, ISBN 978-84-1305-023-2
- Breve historia de Blas de Lezo (2019), Nowtilus, ISBN 978-84-1305-080-5
- Historia del navío de línea (2020), Renacimiento, ISBN 978-84-18387-22-7
- Cazatesoros y expolios de buques sumergidos (2020), Nowtilus, ISBN 978-84-1305-077-5
- Canales marítimos: gigantes de la ingeniería en el mar (2020), Glyphos, ISBN 978-8494401817

=== Fiction ===
- Pequeño Escota (2001) Juventud, ISBN 978-8426132215
- Soy capitán (2003), Noray, ISBN 978-8474861310
- Memorias de Trafalgar (2005), Noray, ISBN 978-8474861556
- La carrera del té (2010), Noray, ISBN 978-8474861808
- Indiamen (2011), Juventud, ISBN 978-8426138989
- Caudales (2013), Librum Tremens, ISBN 978-8415074342
- Morirás por Cartagena (2014), Punto de Vista, ISBN 978-8415930167
- Siete robles (2015), Punto de Vista, ISBN 978-84-1593-062-4
- El perfil del infinito (2016), Nowtilus, ISBN 978-84-9967-785-9
