= Raid on the Kerkennah Islands =

Spanish raid on Ottoman Tunisia

Raid on the Kerkennah Islands (1611)
- Part of Spanish–Ottoman wars
Date	September 28 – October 2, 1611
Location	Kerkennah Islands, Ottoman Tunisia
Result	Spanish victory

Belligerents
Spanish Empire; Republic of Genoa; Order of St. John	Eyalet of Tunis

Commanders and leaders
Álvaro de Bazán y Benavides; Ottavio d'Aragona	Unknown

Strength
35 galleys	1,200 soldiers

Casualties and losses
Minor	680 dead 500 prisoners

The raid on the Kerkennah Islands of 1611 was a naval attack by Spanish commander Álvaro de Bazán y Benavides against the Kerkennah Islands, in Ottoman Tunisia. It resulted in a victory of the Spanish and its Italian allies over the local Ottomans and Barbary corsairs.

== Background ==
The raid was conceived by the court as a way to weaken the local Ottoman grip and capture galley slaves for the Mediterranean galley squads. On September 12, Bazán sailed off from Sicily at the head himself of 12 galleys from Naples, 7 of Sicily under Ottavio d'Aragona, 11 from Genoa and 5 from the Order of St. John. It was planned in cooperation with the Great Master of St. John, Alof de Wignacourt. The fleet carried land troops from the Order of St. John, the tercios of Sicily and Lombardy, along with Spanish Marine Infantry from Naples. The expedition found constant bad weather, being forced to stop at Lampedusa before reaching Tunis.

== Battle ==
Bazán hid the fleet near the Kerkennah Islands and ordered captain Diego Pimentel, the son of Juan Alonso Pimentel de Herrera, to block the pass between the islands and the coast with six galleys. Pimental first and the rest of the fleet afterwards had to the scout the location, given that they had no reliable knowledge of it. On October 27, the fleet faced the island of Chergui and performed an amphibious assault against the towers and fortifications built by the Tunisians, employing the artillery to cover the landing. The infantry divided itself in three squads, captained by maestre de campo Sancho de Luna and Luis de Córdoba, and took over the island, burning down all the buildings and sacking the local cattle.

Shortly after they assaulted the bulwark in the island of Gharbi, with the help of a local whom they freed in exchange for showing them the way. Bazán ordered the infantry to wade towards Gharbi on low tide and secure the place for the cavalry led by Antonio de Mendoza, but the plan collapsed when several noblemen in the cavalry, among them Giovanni d'Ávalos, descendant of Fernando d'Ávalos, attacked before their time. The allied cavalry became swamped and suffered casualties while the infantry tried to assist them, until finally discipline returned and they managed to reform again. The allies finally overcame the local resistance, killing 380 defenders and forcing the rest to abandon the bulwark, killing 300 more and capturing 500 before the rest escaped in boats to mainland. Not finding any more enemies, Bazán gave the order to return to the galleys and return to Sicily.

== Aftermath ==
Despite its relative success, the raid was criticized by the viceroy of Sicily, Pedro Téllez-Girón, Duke of Osuna, who warned the court that combined operations like these were badly planned and cost more money and resources than what they obtained in exchange. Osuna initiated a plan to reform the Sicilian squads, paid out of his own money, in order to increase efficiency. The measure soon brought a notable success in his own raid on Tunis the following year, in which a corsair fleet was destroyed in the port of La Goulette, after which his forces fortuitously joined these of Bazán to perform a similar raid on Bizerte.

== Bibliography ==
- Fernández Duro, Cesáreo (1885). El gran duque de Osuna y su marina: jornadas contra turcos y venecianos (1602-1624). Sucesores de Rivadeneyra.
- de la Guardia, Ricardo (1914). Notas para un Cronicón de la Marina Militar de España. Anales de trece siglos de historia de la marina. El Correo Gallego.
