= Ottoman expedition to Messina =

Ottoman expedition to Spanish Sicily

- Part of Spanish–Ottoman wars
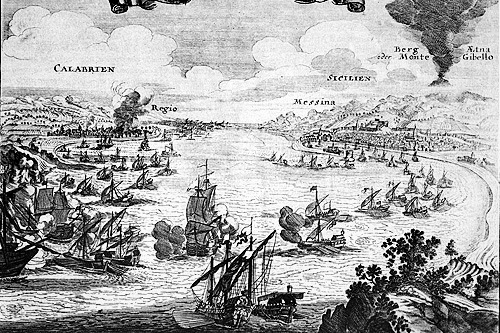
- Battle against Ottoman ships in Messina in the 17th century.
Date	August 1613
Location	Messina, Sicily
Result	Spanish victory

Belligerents
Spanish Empire	Ottoman Empire

Commanders and leaders
Pedro Téllez-Girón	Azaga; Escander; Azan Bey

Strength
5 galleys	2 carracks 4 galleys Several galiots

Casualties and losses
5 dead	7 vessels captured Many dead and prisoners

The Ottoman expedition to Messina in 1613 was an attempt by the Ottoman Empire to deliver a disguised attack in the port of Messina, in the Spanish viceroyalty of Sicily. Due to the spywork of Viceroy Pedro Téllez-Girón, Duke of Osuna, the expedition was discovered and its members were captured or killed almost in their totality.

== Background ==
In 1613, Ottoman spies received that Spain was gathering an armada in Messina with the goal to conquer the Regency of Algiers, comparing the plan to the Algiers Expedition with Andrea Doria from half a century before, as well as the more recent project in 1600 by Giovanni Andrea Doria which never realized. In order to prevent it, the Sublime Porte launched an expedition under the command of two Spanish converts to Islam, Azaga and Escander, expecting to infiltrate Messina and destroy the fleet in port.

The expedition sailed off in two naus disguised as Venetian merchants, escorted by a fleet of galleys and galiots commanded by admiral Azan Bey to support them if necessary. In case of success, their next target would be the Hospitaller Malta, one of the main vantage points against the Ottoman navy in the Mediterranean. However, spies of the Duke of Osuna in Constantinople found about the operation and sent messengers, which reached Messina before the Turkish fleet did.

== Battle ==
On August 28, Azaga and Escander arrived in the harbor of Messina and landed freely thanks to their disguise. Osuna, deducing these were the ships he had been warned about, visited personally the ships without voicing his suspicions, under the excuse of being interested in the cargo of high quality glass and mirrors they brought. Once on board, he ascertained the crews were actually Turks pretending to be Venetians and the ships carried too much artillery for mere merchants.

After returning to land, Osuna ordered infantry captain Irrizaga to return to the ship with a squad of guards and ask the captains to accompany them to Osuna's palace for a burocratic formality. While the commanders were away, two other squads raided the ships and arrested the unaware crews with little resistance. Osuna tried to convince the captains to admit their plan, and when they refused, he had them tortured until they confessed their true purpose. The duke had them hanged, Escander and Azaga among them, and chained all the rest of the prisoners as galley slaves.

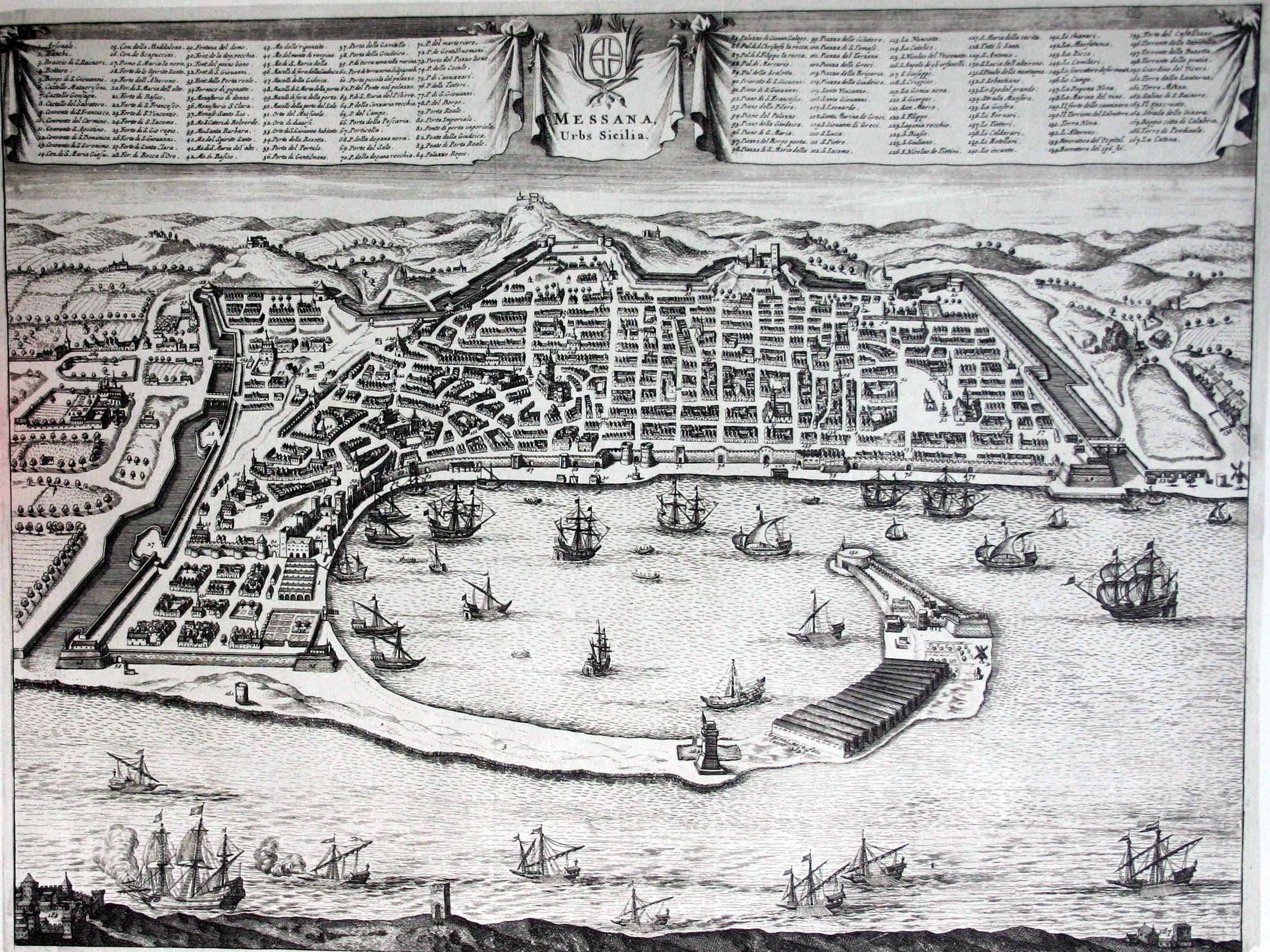
Messina in 1622.

In order to dispose of Azan Bey, Osuna called Alonso Pimentel, the son of Juan Alonso Pimentel de Herrera and lieutenant in Naples with experience under Álvaro de Bazán y Benavides, and placed him in a squad of galleys of Sicily captained by Gonzalo de Cárdenas, also including some volunteers from the Sicilian nobility. Pimentel and Cárdenas found Azan's fleet in the mouth of the rivers of Squillace, in Calabria. The Ottomans escaped, but the Spanish and Italians captured two of their galleys and three galiots, along with a Genoese ship the Turks had previously captured. They acquired 20,000 gold sequins and 300 prisoners. Some Ottomans were left behind in land, but were hunted down by the Spanish Marine Infantry and the local Neapolitan cavalry.

== Aftermath ==
Still lacking slaves for the captured galleys, Osuna found them with a novel method. He called to his palace all the paupers in Sicily, and after paying alms to the children, the women and the elderly, he announced he would increase his payment to all men who could long-jump a wooden bar, the higher the better. Those who beat the test, instead of being paid, were immediately arrested for vagrancy and thrown to galleys, with Osuna chastising them for living off charity despite having proved to be physically fit to work. Shortly after, Ottavio d'Aragona arrived to Messina from the Battle of Cape Corvo.

== Bibliography ==
- Anderson, Roger Charles (1952). Naval wars in the Levant, 1559-1853. Princeton University Press.
- Corbett, Julian (2007). England in the Mediterranean: A Study of the Rise and Influence of British Power Within the Straits, 1603-1713. Cosimo. ISBN 9781602062672.
- Duro, Cesáreo Fernández (1885). El gran duque de Osuna y su marina: jornadas contra turcos y venecianos (1602-1624). Sucesores de Rivadeneyra.
- De la Guardia, Ricardo (1914). Notas para un Cronicón de la Marina Militar de España. Anales de trece siglos de historia de la marina. El Correo Gallego.
