= Raid on La Goulette (1617) =

Spanish raid on Ottoman Tunisia

- Part of Spanish–Ottoman wars
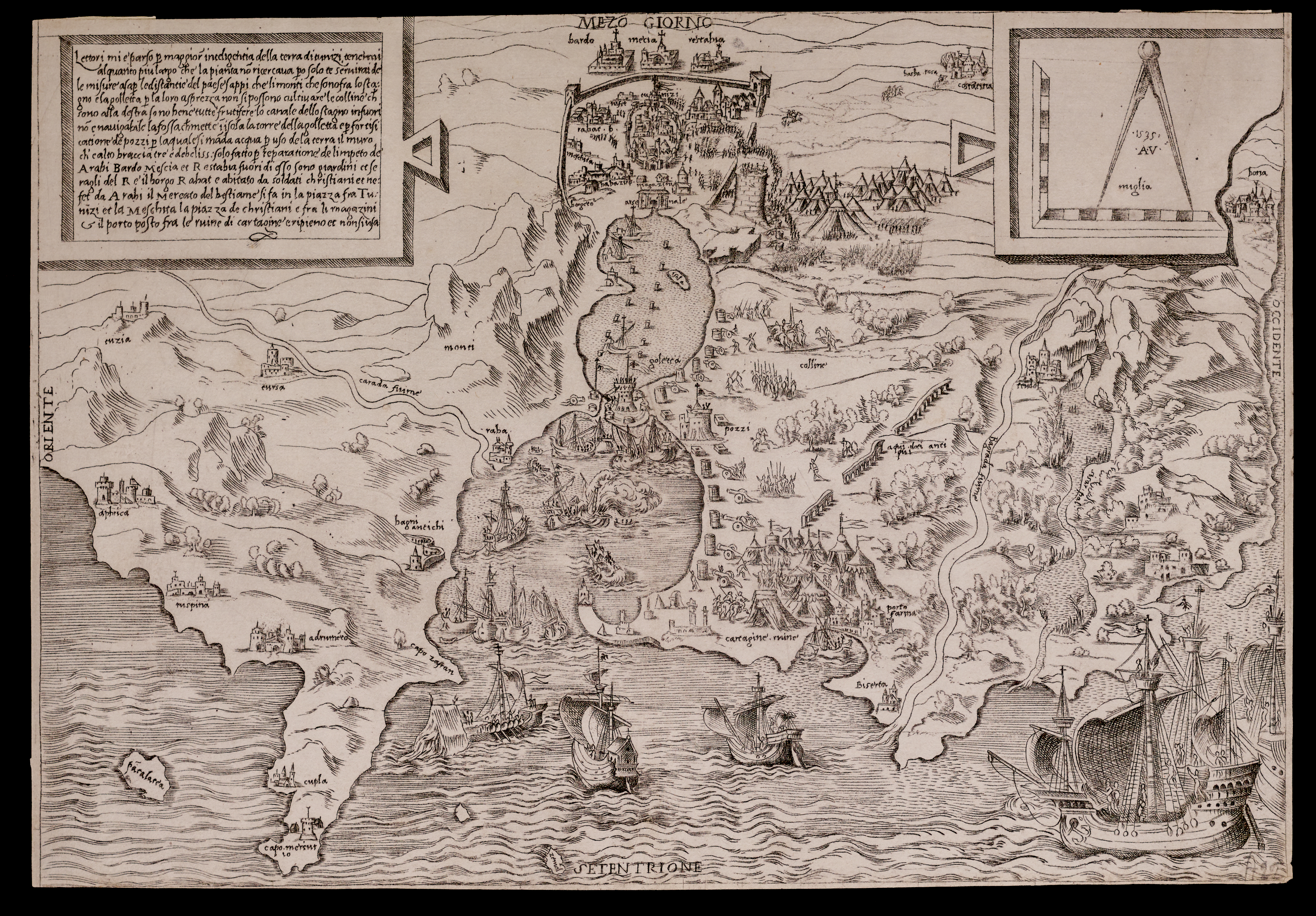
- Tunis and La Goulette in 1535.
Date	October 1617
Location	Halq al-Wadi, Ottoman Tunisia
Result	Spanish victory

Belligerents
Spanish Empire	Eyalet of Tunis

Commanders and leaders
Ottavio d'Aragona	Yusuf Dey

Strength
1 galleon 3 carracks 1 patache 6 galleys	10 ships

Casualties and losses
Minor	All vessels destroyed

The raid on La Goulette of 1617 was a naval attack by Sicilian-Spanish captain Ottavio d'Aragona on La Goulette, the port of Ottoman Tunisia, where he destroyed the fleet in port in response to acts of local Barbary pirates.

== Background ==
In October 1617, in spite of continuous anti-piratic activities by the Spanish navy, Viceroy of Naples, Pedro Téllez-Girón, Duke of Osuna learned about new Ottoman and Barbary pirates, leading him to order a raid against the nearby state of the Ottoman Tunisia, a usual center of Muslim piracy. The attack fell on Ottavio d'Aragona, a veteran in Osuna's service who had already carried on a raid on Constantinople, the capital of the Ottoman Empire. Osuna ordered him to "burn and put to the sword all kinds of privateers he found" (abrasar y pasar a cuchillo todo género de corsarios que hallasen). Ottavio received command of six galleys, among them the flagship of Naples, La Negra, along with one galleon, one patache and three naos.

== Battle ==
As in previous Spanish attacks to La Goulette, d'Aragona disembarked in the harbor of La Goulette, where he found the local armada in port, at the time composed by ten sailing ships. He attacked and burn the ships, one of them captained by Yusuf Dey, commander of Tunis, who promptly escaped the ship and took refuge in the fortress of La Goulette. d'Aragona could sack little as the fire destroyed most of the ships' goods, but he took a small amount of it in gold sequins.

== Aftermath ==
Eleven days after leaving Tunis, d'Aragona's fleet found a fleet of twelve Ottoman galleys heading there. He attacked them and captured seven, among them the flagship, captained by the former Pasha of Saloni, while the other three escaped. The Duke of Osuna had the Pasha treated as a guest, allowing him to return to Constantinople with fifteen slaves in order to collect his ransom, while leaving his teenage son as a hostage. The ransom included various gifts, among them teacups with the supposed ability of breaking when a poisoned beverage was poured on them.

The Spanish navy assaulted La Goulette successfully again thrice in the following years, by Francisco de Ribera en 1619, Diego Pimentel in 1621 and Álvaro de Bazán y Benavides in 1623, destroying the local privateer ships.

== Bibliography ==
- Fernández Duro, Cesáreo (1903). La Armada Española desde la unión de los reinos de Castilla y Aragón. Tipográfico.
- Fernández Duro, Cesáreo (2006). El gran duque de Osuna y su marina: jornadas contra turcos y venecianos (1602–1624) (in Spanish). Spain: Editorial Renacimiento. ISBN 978-84-8472-126-0.
- De la Guardia, Ricardo (1914). Notas para un Cronicón de la Marina Militar de España. Anales de trece siglos de historia de la marina. El Correo Gallego.
