= Ali Arraez Rabazin =

- Born: Ariano, Ferrara
- Military career
- Allegiance: Ottoman Empire
- Branch: Beylik of Tunis
- Service years: c.1614–1624
- Rank: Captain
- Commands: Barbary corsairs
- Conflicts: Ottoman–Habsburg wars; Battle of the Gulf of Tunis

Ali Arraez Rabazin, born Francesco Guicciardino (fl. 1624), was a Barbary corsair of the 17th century. He was born in Ferrara and sailed from the Ottoman Tunisia, where he was a ferry boy before being captured in the Battle of the Gulf of Tunis.

== Biography ==
Son of Ferrarese ferry man Giovanni Battista Guicciardino, Francesco worked as a ferry boy in the Po river. He later became a cabin boy in a ship which was captured by Tunisian corsairs on October 9, 1607, which turned him into a slave. He converted to Islam at 17 and adopted the name of Ali, joining Barbary piracy himself. At some point, he was captured by Christian galleys and taken to Naples, where he spent time in prison until finding his chance to escape. According to Spanish sources, he had been captured by Álvaro de Bazán y Benavides, who kept him as a servant in his flagship.

=== As a corsair ===
He came again to the service of Yusuf Dey of Tunis, where he served in a corsair galley before getting his own. His jump to fame came when he captured several Venetian ships carrying 250 soldiers between Venice and Candia. Afterwards he became a wealthy owner of lands and slaves and married two wives, although he was reported to be unpopular due to his cruelty and habit of drinking wine. In 1614 he found his nephew also enslaved in Barbary and tried to convince him to convert to Islam, without success. He capitalized on the knowledge of navigation and the coasts of Spain, Sardinia and Sicily he had acquired, eventually becoming a powerful local player. By 1624, according to chronicler and soldier Diego Duque de Estrada, Rabazin "could deploy thirty vessels on the sea, and one hundred if he willed to resort to his allies". He was a comrade and rival of English renegade Sampson Denball, later known as Ali Reis.

In June of the same year, Rabazin was at the head of three captured galleons with Denball as his lieutenant when they came upon a large galley fleet commanded by Bazán y Benavides. Despite the tonnage of the galleons, Bazán's superior artillery and tactics prevailed and the Barbary ships were captured. Duque de Estrada himself was one of the first to board and dueled personally Rabazin, wounding him in the face with his rapier and helping capture him. The Spanish found the equivalent to 300,000 piezas de a ocho gained through privateering activities, as well as three Russian slaves he kept as part of his harem. Rabazin defended himself claiming that before the battle he was going to retire and become a Pasha.

=== Trial ===
He was taken to the inquisition's dungeons in Palermo, where he was tortured and subjected to a long and infamous 18-year trial. He claimed to have been born a Muslim in Sinop, Turkey in 1584 in order not to be tried for heresy, but he was recognized as an Italian renegade by several freed slaves. It was also found that he had willed his few goods in Italy to his sister Catarina with the help of the French consul in Tunis. After admitting the truth, he later claimed to own thousands of slaves and proposed an exchange of prisoners to be freed, offering 30,000 écus for his rescue. One of his wives also appealed to the Dey of Tunis for him.

He was ultimately condemned to perpetual prison in 1632, but this was seen as break of the conventions of war by the Tunisians, who threatened to suspend any rescue of Christian prisoners and threatened all of them. In turn, authorities in Sicily threatened to do the same to Moor slaves and confiscate all Muslim merchants they could find. The following year, Yusuf Dey came to the extent to write to Viceroy Fernando Afán de Ribera ensuring the safety of the prisoners. After Yusuf's death, Usta Murad took the baton, and after his own death, Ahmed Khodja made new threats again, with the French consul also offered his help, but the trial seemed stagnant. Ultimately, the Inquisition got the king's favor and ratified Ali's prison. He disappears from the sources shortly after.

== Bibliography ==
- Duque de Estrada, Diego (1860). Memorial histórico español: colección de documentos, opúsculos y antigüedades que publica la Real Academia de la Historia. Comentarios del desengañado · Tomo 12. Academia de la Historia.
- Fernández Duro, Cesáreo (1885). El gran duque de Osuna y su marina: jornadas contra turcos y venecianos (1602-1624). Sucesores de Rivadeneyra.
- Gómez, Antonio (2019). Con balas de plata VI. 1621-30. Difundia. ISBN 9788417799991.
