= Battle of Palermo (1624) =

Battle between Spanish and Barbary galleys near Palermo

- Part of Spanish–Ottoman wars
| Date | May 1624 |
| Location | Palermo, Sicily |
| Result | Christian victory |

Belligerents
| Spanish Empire; Order of St. John | Eyalet of Tunis; Regency of Algiers |

Commanders and leaders
| Álvaro de Bazán y Benavides | Unknown |

Strength
| 28 galleys | 13 galleys |

Casualties and losses
| Unknown | 7 galleys sunk 6 galleys captured |

The Battle of Palermo of 1624 was a naval battle between Hispano-Maltese fleet led by Álvaro de Bazán y Benavides and a Barbary corsair fleet from Tunisia and Algiers.

== Background ==
In 1624, Álvaro de Bazán y Benavides returned to Sicily from patrolling near Ibiza and capturing there three loaded Ottoman galleons in route to Alexandria. Learning that a combined Barbary fleet, composed by galleys from the Regency of Algiers and the Ottoman Tunisian port of Bizerte, was cruising and making prey around the coasts of Italy and Spain, he decided to take action. Bazán sailed off from Palermo at the head of 14 galleys from Sicily and 14 from the Order of St. John of Malta. By coincidence, the Barbary armada was at the other side of the cape of Palermo, and both fleets clashed three days later.

== Battle ==
Despite their disadvantage in numbers, the Barbary galleys formed and became ready for battle. Comfortable with his own predicament, Bazán sent Ensign Juan de Quesada in a boat and offered them to surrender, but the Turk captain in command of the Muslims declined the offer and demanded in turn be given free passage of Algiers, where they were previously heading to. The battle started shortly after, with Bazán ordering to open fire with all of their artillery. The Barbary fleet was overwhelmed and attempted to turn back and escape the way they came, but the Christians hunted them down, sinking seven of them and capturing the remnant six. Many prisoners were taken and 400 Christian galley slaves were freed.

== Aftermath ==
Victory was communicated to Viceroy of Sicily, Emmanuel Philibert of Savoy, who ordered the booty to be divided among the crewmen. Bazán would sail again against Barbary fleets later into the month, achieving victory in the battles of Gulf of Tunis and the Dalmatian Coast.

== Bibliography ==
- Fernández Duro, Cesáreo (1885). El gran duque de Osuna y su marina: jornadas contra turcos y venecianos (1602-1624). Sucesores de Rivadeneyra.
- Gómez, Antonio (2019). Con balas de plata VI. 1621-30. Difundia. ISBN 9788417799991.
- de la Guardia, Ricardo (1914). Notas para un Cronicón de la Marina Militar de España. Anales de trece siglos de historia de la marina. El Correo Gallego.
