= Raid on Cherchell (1613) =

- Part of the Spanish–Ottoman wars and the Ottoman–Habsburg wars
Date	22 March 1613
Location	Cherchell, Regency of Algiers
Result	Spanish victory

Belligerents
Spanish Empire	Regency of Algiers

Commanders and leaders
Ottavio d'Aragona	Unknown

Strength
8 galleys 800 soldiers	4 ships 6,000 soldiers

Casualties and losses
2 dead 20 wounded	4 ships sunk 800 confirmed dead

The raid on Cherchell of 1613 was an attack by a Spanish flotilla under Ottavio d'Aragona on the Algerian stronghold of Cherchell, as part of an operation against Barbary corsairs.

== Background ==
In early 1613, the Spanish viceroy of Sardinia, Carlos de Borja, warned his Sicilian counterpart, Pedro Téllez-Girón, Duke of Osuna, about nearby activities of the Regency of Algiers, vassals to the Ottoman Empire, whose ships harassed the island. Osuna gave Ottavio d'Aragona orders to come out with a galley fleet to clean the coast from privateers, and in case of not finding then, attack Cherchell, the main supply port of Algiers. d'Aragona was coming from a series of successes and helping relieve Malta from an Ottoman invasion.

According to his orders, d'Aragona sailed off from Palermo with eight galleys, the Concepción, Patrona, Milicia, San Pedro, Escalona, Fortuna, Osuna and Peñafiel, with 800 soldiers from the Tercio of Sicily onboard. He circled Sardinia, but upon not finding the corsairs, he headed for Cherchell. His force was substantially small for the enterprise, but the Spanish marine infantry had experience in similar operations, like the then recent raid on La Goulette by Antonio Pimentel.

== Battle ==
d'Aragona disembarked in Cherchell and divided his contingent of arqubusiers, musketeers and pikemen into two sections, ordering the first to assault the stronghold and the other to remain mobile to repulse the local relief which was predicted to come. The Algerians, anticipating the gate would be demolished, opened it to receive them with a piece of artillery, but the Spanish managed to sneak in with little harm.

350 men sacked the city, killing 300 defenders and capturing the city's Ottoman governors, making few other alive prisoners due to their resistance. The other 450 remained outside and delayed the growing relief forces arriving from Algiers. Two Spaniards were killed in the assault, among them Captain Juan Ruiz de Castañeda. The city's port housed four carracks, which were sacked and sunk. Eventually, after finishing the sack, d'Aragona called for a controlled retreat in formation to the galleys through the Algerian relief forces outside Cherchell, which already numbered around 6,000. The salty was done in enough order to rout the relievers, killing 500 at the cost of no casualty. The forces embarked again, carrying important booty in money, pearls and rich textiles.

== Aftermath ==
The operations's success was celebrated in Palermo. However, Osuna found out the Ottoman armada was mobilizing, so he armed d'Aragona's fleet again as soon as possibly and sent him to Turkish waters. This resulted in the Battle of Cape Corvo, where d'Aragona defeated and captured an Ottoman fleet. d'Aragona later sacked the Tunisian ports of La Goulette and Bizerte.

== Bibliography ==
- Anderson, Roger Charles (1952). Naval wars in the Levant, 1559-1853. Princeton University Press.
- Fernández Duro, Cesáreo (1885). El gran duque de Osuna y su marina: jornadas contra turcos y venecianos (1602-1624). Sucesores de Rivadeneyra.
- Linde, Luis M (2005). Don Pedro Girón, duque de Osuna: La hegemonía española en Europa a comienzos del siglo XVII. Encuentro.
- Sánchez Doncel, Gregorio (1991). Presencia de España en Orán, 1509-1792. Estudio Teológico de San Ildefonso. ISBN 9788460076148.
