= Battle of Tunis (disambiguation) =

The Battle of Tunis is another name for the Battle of the Bagradas River (255 BC).

Battle of Tunis may also refer to:

- Battle of White Tunis (310 BC)
- Siege of Tunis (Mercenary War) (238 BC)
- Battle of Lake Tunis (149 BC)
- Eighth Crusade (1270)
- Battle of the Gulf of Tunis (1624)
- Revolutions of Tunis (1675–1705)
- Tunisia Campaign (1942–43)
  - Run for Tunis (1942)
  - Operation Flax (1943)
  - Operation Strike (1943)

== See also ==
- Conquest of Tunis (disambiguation)
- Raid on La Goulette (disambiguation)
