= Fattouma Namla =

- Born: 3 August 1935; Kerkennah Islands
- Died: 7 May 1994

Fattouma Namla (Arabic: فطومة النملة; August 3, 1935 – May 7, 1994) was a Tunisian trade unionist and activist.

== Early life and education ==
Fattouma Namla was born in 1935 in Tunisia's Kerkennah Islands.

After attending high school in the port city of Sfax, she graduated from the University of Ez-Zitouna branch there.

== Activism ==
Namla became active in the labor movement, following in the footsteps of her trade unionist family. She also joined the Muslim Union of Tunisian Women in the late 1940s. She has been described as "an icon of the national struggle."

She became involved with the Neo Destour party in Sfax, helping found its first feminist section in 1952. In that same period, she participated in anti-colonial demonstrations, and on March 8, 1952, she was arrested while leading a protest for International Women's Day. Despite being heavily pregnant with her first daughter, she was subsequently imprisoned for a period.

Namla was later engaged with the labor protests of January 26, 1978, known as "Black Thursday" in Tunisia. In the aftermath, she worked to promote the cause within the International Confederation of Free Trade Unions and to support those imprisoned during the protests, including her own husband, fellow trade unionist Mohamed Dami. She would travel to Tunis from Sfax with baskets of food for the prisoners, which secretly contained information about the trial process. Her son was also arrested and tortured at this time.

Later, Namla also worked to establish a school for girls.

== Death and legacy ==
Fattouma Namla died in 1994 at age 58.

In 2022, her image was included as part of a series of Tunisian postage stamps depicting important women in the country's history.
