= Battle of Cape Corvo =

Ottoman - Habsburg naval battle in 1613

- Part of Spanish–Ottoman wars
- Battle between Spanish and Ottoman galleys. Oil on canvas attributed to Cornelis de Wael.
Date	August 1613
Location	Off Cape Corvo, south of Karaburun Peninsula, Turkey
Result	Spanish victory

Belligerents
Spain	Ottoman Empire

Commanders and leaders
Ottavio d'Aragona	Sinari Pasha (POW)

Strength
8 galleys	10 galleys

Casualties and losses
6 killed, 30 wounded	7 galleys captured, 400 killed, 600 prisoners, 1,200 slaves freed

The Battle of Cape Corvo was a naval engagement of the Ottoman–Habsburg wars fought as part of the struggle for the control of the Mediterranean. It took place in August 1613 near the island of Samos when a Spanish squadron from Sicily, under Admiral Ottavio d'Aragona, engaged an Ottoman fleet led by Sinari Pasha. The Spanish were victorious and captured seven galleys and about 600 prisoners, among them the Bey of Alexandria and another 60 important Ottoman nobles.

Cape Corvo was the first major victory of the Spanish fleets under Pedro Téllez-Girón, 3rd Duke of Osuna, the Spanish Viceroy of Sicily, as well as the greatest Spanish victory over the Ottoman Empire since the Battle of Lepanto.

== Background ==
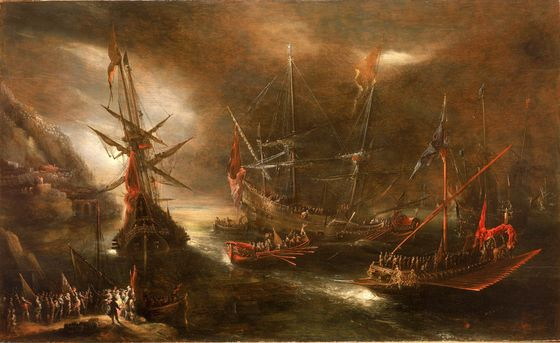
Embarkation of Spanish Troops on the Mediterranean Coast, by Andries van Eertvelt.

When Pedro Téllez-Girón, 3rd Duke of Osuna, was appointed Viceroy of Sicily in 1610, his main goal after the elimination of the widespread banditry on the island became the reconstruction of its naval forces. Upon his arrival, the Spanish squadron of Sicily had no seaworthy galleys, and the population feared an Ottoman attack. By July 1612, eight galleys and several sailing vessels had been built following Osuna's instructions. Meanwhile, in a raid on La Goulette, Don Antonio Pimentel burnt seven enemy sailing ships led by Zymen Danseker that same year. Osuna trusted the command of aforce to the Palermitan Ottavio d'Aragona, his favourite naval commander. D'Aragona carried out some raids in Ottoman territory, attacking by surprise La Goulette again and raiding Cherchell with 200 musketeers, 50 arquebusiers, and 100 pikemen.

Upon d'Aragona's return, Osuna ordered him to prepare a campaign to face the Ottoman fleet in its own waters. The Viceroy had been warned of the departure of a large fleet from Constantinople, and although his informers did not notice the preparation of any attack against the island, he preferred to make sure of it. D'Aragona's galleys were reinforced, each one with 100 muskets, 50 spontoons, 20 bucklers, and 150 chuzos in case it was necessary to arm the rowers to help the galley's soldiers fight the Ottomans. Osuna's flagship, meanwhile, was reinforced with 160 musketeers and seven cannons. According to the Viceroy's spies, the Ottoman fleet was composed of 12 galleys under Mahomet Pasha, a lieutenant of Nasauf Pasha, who remained in Constantinople to consult with Sultan Ahmed I about issues concerning the war with Persia.

== Battle ==
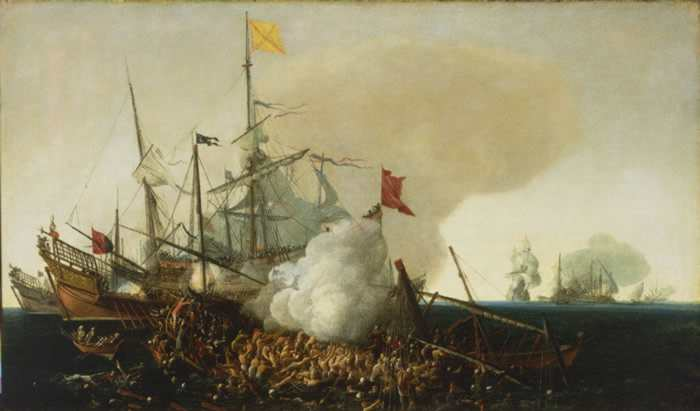
Spanish Men-of-War Engaging Barbary Pirates, painting of 1615 by Cornelis Vroom.

Ottavio d'Aragona set sail to the Aegean Sea in command of his eight galleys. South of Samos, the Spanish Admiral was informed by Greek fishermen of the presence of 10 Ottoman galleys under Sinari Pasha in the surrounding area. The squadron crossed the Mycale Strait thanks to the help of an able Greek and arrived off Cape Corvo, where the Ottoman fleet was anchored: it was positioned with two galleys in the vanguard, two forming the main battle group, and three in the rear-guard. D'Aragona, having been warned of the presence of Sinari Pasha's vessels by a felucca previously detached ahead his fleet, ordered the attack, and followed by his squadron, approached the Ottoman formation and rammed its flagship. After three hours of combat, Sinari Pasha surrendered his galley, and was followed by his second-in-command and five other galleys. The remaining three managed to escape.

About 400 Ottoman soldiers and sailors were killed, and another 600 captured. Among the most prominent prisoners were Sinari Pasha, who died of sorrow shortly after, and Mahamet, Bey of Alexandria and son of Müezzinzade Ali Pasha, who had commanded the Ottoman fleet at the Battle of Lepanto. Moreover, 1,200 Christian galley slaves were freed. The casualties on the Spanish side had been low and consisted of six men killed and 30 wounded. They soon returned to Sicily with their seven prizes, which were incorporated into their fleet upon their arrival at Messina. Another prize was taken during the cruise: a brigantine crewed by 17 Turks. The whole fleet, however, was nearly lost in a storm off Cape Solanto, 10 leagues from Messina, but all ships managed to enter the port with the help of about 70 barges.

== Aftermath ==
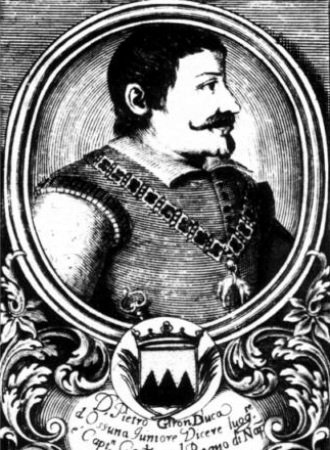
Engraving of Pedro Téllez-Girón y Velasco, 3rd Duke of Osuna.

While d'Aragona was absent from Sicily, Osuna trumped an Ottoman expedition which tried to capture Messina through deception. Two galleys and three galliots were captured, and a prize coming from Cartagena was recovered. The Ottoman landing parties, isolated from their ships, surrendered to the Spanish cavalry or attempted to escape inland.

On 27 September Osuna organized a triumphal procession in Palermo to honour Ottavio d'Aragona. The Spanish Viceroy, d'Aragona, Cardinal Doria, the captains and knights of the galleys, the freed slaves, the 600 Ottoman prisoners, and the 900 soldiers which had participated in the battle, marched through the streets of the city; Osuna's pennant and the captured flags opening the march. The recovery of the Sicilian squadron continued the following years, achieving its most important victories at the battles of Cape Celidonia and Ragusa under Francisco de Ribera, one of Spain's most able naval commanders of the time.
