= Raid on Constantinople =

1616 naval bombing

- Part of Spanish–Ottoman wars
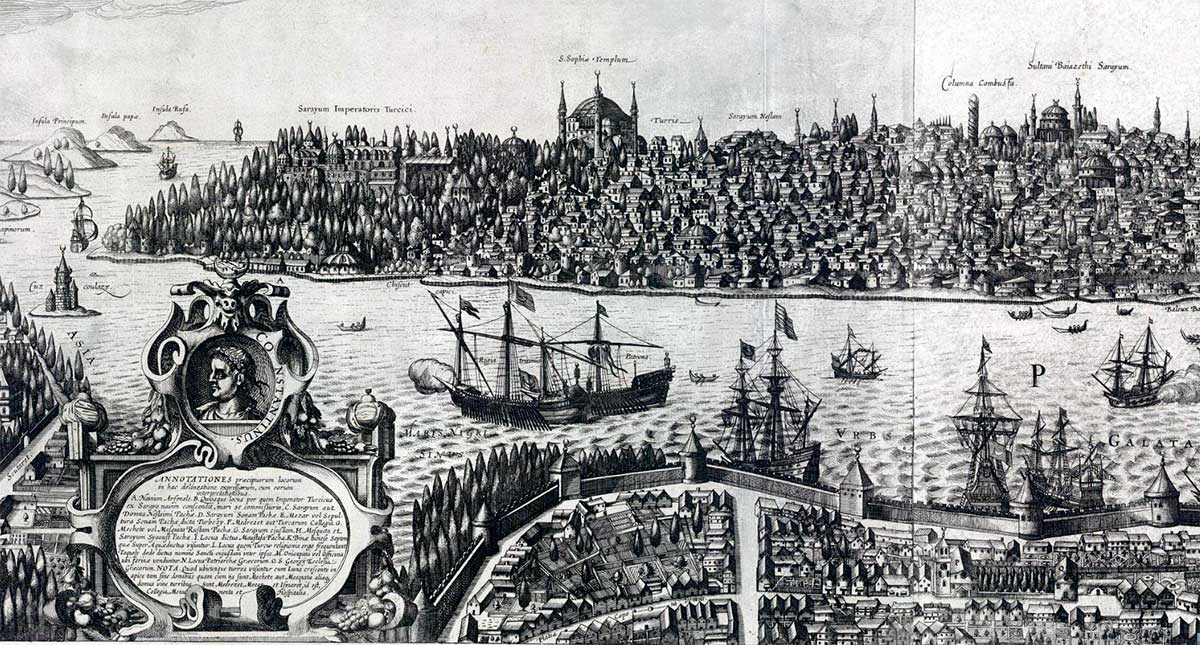
- Constantinople in 1616.
Date	October 1616
Location	Constantinople, Ottoman Empire
Result	Spanish victory

Belligerents
(Spain) Spanish Empire	Ottoman Empire

Commanders and leaders
Ottavio d'Aragona	Unknown

Units involved
9 galleys	48 galleys

Casualties and losses
Unknown	Unknown

The Raid on Constantinople of 1616 was a Spanish raid on Constantinople, the capital city of the Ottoman Empire. It was performed by Ottavio d'Aragona on the orders of Viceroy of Naples Pedro Téllez-Girón, Duke of Osuna.

== Background ==
After the success of the battle of Cape Gelidonya in July 1616, as well as the defeat of the Ottoman privateer Arzan in August, Osuna arranged for his lieutenant Ottavio d'Aragona to launch a raiding action in Turkish waters. Instead of Osuna's private galleon fleet employed in Gelidonya, Ottavio sailed off with nine galleys from the royal fleet on October 12, trusting on their already experienced crews. The expedition was chronicled by captain Diego Duque de Estrada. However, Anderson believed the posited date was a typo and placed the flotilla's departure on September 12, leaving much more time for their expedition.

== Battle ==
d'Aragona disguised the galleys as Ottoman vessels and crossed the Aegean Sea without being detected. Around the same time, the remnants of the Ottoman fleet engaged in Cape Gelidonya were returning to their bases in the Dardanelles, so it's possible his fleet was mistaken by some of these ships. They cruised through Candia, Corone, Modon and Negroponte, eventually leaving the Dodecanese and coming to the Sea of Marmara in front of Constantinople.

The fleet entered the city's port still without raising alarms, and once inside they dropped the disguise and starting firing their artillery against the city. After some bombardment, d'Aragona received word the Ottomans had recovered from the surprise and deployed 60 galleys (possibly not as many in reality, given the state of the Ottoman navy at the time) in order to block the Dardanelles and cut their retreat. After consulting with his captains, Ottavio waited for nightfall to order the fleet to ram one of the two wings of Ottoman galleys. Confusion rose among the Ottoman, who failed at identify the Spanish due to the darkness and the high number of ships.

Free from the blockade and with favorable wind, d'Aragona had the fleet turn off their lanterns and navigate in darkness, while his own ship acted as a decoy with a light on. After eight hours of being chased, he turned his light off as well and escaped in the darkness to their rendezvous point. The ruse was successful, causing the Turkish fleet to head for Candia when the Spaniards had actually sailed off towards Alexandria. Capitalizing on the chance, d'Aragona sacked the Egyptian coast, and upon finding ten Ottoman ships, he attacked them without allowing them to use their superior size and artillery. The resultant booty was a million and half ducats.

Sultan Ahmed I became so indignant at the events that he had many Christians in Constantinople arrested on suspicions of having served as spies. Ottavio decided then to return to Naples, opting to properly brief Osuna before further diplomatic consequences. He arrived in Naples on November 9.

== Aftermath ==
The bombardment caused only minor damage, but its political and strategical resonance was huge. The fleets of the Duke of Osuna were reputed to be fearless and able to back it up. The conflict between the Viceroyalty of Naples and the Ottoman Empire was joined in 1617 by the Republic of Venice, which claimed exclusivity of the Adriatic Sea and kept association with Ottoman, French and Dutch enemies of Spain. The Duke of Osuna proposed the court of Philip III to conquer Venice at the same time he sent letters trying to drive a wedge between Venice and Turkey.

Osuna dealt defeats to both opponents throughout 1617. Fleets captained by d'Aragona and Francisco de Ribera chased off the Venetian armada commanded by Justo Antonio Belegno, and a patrol of three galleys by Pedro Pimentel defeated and killed Mahomed Arzan, son of the previous Arzan and a former captive of Spain himself, whom the new Sultan Osman II had sent with six galleys to sack Calabria. Belegno's successor Giacomo Zane obtained the same result as him, after which Pedro de Gamboa captured a Turkish merchant fleet for another million and half ducats. In response, Venetians and Ottomans planned to attack Naples with an armada of 48 Ottoman galleys, similar in size to that deployed in Gelidonya, but a storm forced it to return. Around this time, Osuna also had the Pasha of Cyprus captured in route, and Ribera fought and defeated the Venetians in Ragusa.

== Sources ==
- Anderson, Roger Charles (1952). Naval wars in the Levant, 1559-1853. Princeton University Press.
- Canales, Carlos; Rey, Miguel (2019). Naves mancas: la Armada Española a vela de Cabo Celidonia a Trafalgar. EDAF. ISBN 978-84-414-2879-9.
- Fernández Duro, Cesáreo (2006) [1885]. El gran duque de Osuna y su marina: jornadas contra turcos y venecianos (1602-1624). Sevilla: Editorial Renacimiento. ISBN 84-8472-126-4.
- San Juan Sánchez, Víctor (2018). Breve historia de las batallas navales del Mediterráneo. Nowtilus. ISBN 9788499679365.
