= Raid on La Goulette =

Raid on La Goulette may refer to:

- Raid on La Goulette (1609), Spanish attack on the Ottoman Tunisian port of La Goulette by Luis Fajardo
- Raid on La Goulette (1612), Spanish attack on the Ottoman Tunisian port of La Goulette by Antonio Pimentel
- Raid on La Goulette (1615), Spanish attack on the Ottoman Tunisian port of La Goulette by Francisco de Rivera
- Raid on La Goulette (1617), Spanish attack on the Ottoman Tunisian port of La Goulette by Ottavio d'Aragona
