= Ottavio d'Aragona =

Sicilian naval commander (1565–1623)

- Born: 1565; Palermo, Sicily
- Died: 1623 (aged 57–58); Palermo, Sicily
- Military career
- Allegiance: Spanish Empire
- Service years: 1581–1622
- Rank: Maestre de campo
- Conflicts: Eighty Years' War; Siege of Sluis; French Wars of Religion; Siege of Paris; Ottoman–Habsburg wars; Raid on the Kerkennah Islands; Raid on Cherchell (1613); Battle of Cape Corvo; Raid on Żejtun; Raid on Constantinople; Raid on La Goulette (1617)

Ottavio d'Aragona Taglivia (1565–1623) was a Sicilian nobleman in the service of the Hispanic Monarchy. He served under Viceroy of Naples and Sicily Pedro Téllez-Girón, Duke of Osuna as a highly successful naval commander.

== Early life and career ==
He was the son of Carlo d'Aragona Tagliavia, lord of Terranova, who descended from an illegitimate son of King Peter III of Aragon. Not being the firstborn, he started a military career in 1581 and joined the Eighty Years' War as part of the entourage of Alexander Farnese, Prince of Parma, another Italian serving in the Spanish armies, under whom he participated in operations like the capture of Sluis and the relief of Paris. He later moved to the Duchy of Milan, where he became a cavalry officer, and added a distinguished showing during Charles Emmanuel I of Savoy's defensive war against France in 1594. Reclaimed to the Netherlands by Archduke Albert of Austria, d'Aragona served under him until he received an arquebus shot to the head, requiring him to retire temporally.

== Mediterranean theater ==
D'Aragona returned as part of the Spanish Armada in the Mediterranean, which saw continuous activity against the Ottoman Empire and the Barbary piracy, as well as the Republic of Venice. He stationed himself in his native Sicily, joining the galley squad of Martín de Padilla in 1604, and temporarily serving as governor of Messina under Viceroy Juan Gaspar Fernández Pacheco. In 1608 he hunted down a fleet of Barbary pirates who had kidnapped the viceroy's son, although he failed to find him despite capturing several of the ships. Later he helped carry on the Expulsion of the Moriscos in Cartagena, and in 1610 he was maestre de campo to Juan de Mendoza y Velasco during the cession of Larache.

In 1611, d'Aragona convinced the Duke of Osuna, the new Viceroy of Sicily, to appoint him commander of his galley fleet, replacing the absent and notoriously uncooperative Pedro de Gamboa y Leyva. d'Aragona had his first showing for him in 1611, when he was part of an armada led by Álvaro II de Bazán to sack the Kerkennah Islands, near Tunis, and the following year he participated in an attack to Djerba teaming up with Genoese and Tuscan ships. In the summer of 1613, he raided the fortress of Cherchell and sacked La Goulette and Bizerte, destroying many Barbary ships in port, and upon his return he defeated a fleet of ten ships and captured seven of them.

d'Aragona earned the reputation of an unbeatable commander, which he lived up to in Samos by destroying the fleet of Sinari Pasha in the Battle of Cape Corvo in August 1613. He acquired booty of 600.000 escudos and captured Mahomet Pasha, bey of Alexandria and son to Ali Pasha, along with two of his wives. In his return, the viceroy hosted a grand parade in Palermo in his honor, featuring 1,200 Christian galley slaves freed during the battle and 600 captured Turks. Three years later, he performed a raid on Constantinople, infiltrating a Spanish fleet disguised as Turk fleets and briefly bombarding the Ottoman capital before diverging for commerce raiding actions. When the Duke of Osuna became Viceroy of Naples in 1616, d'Aragona followed him. The same year he sacked La Goulette twice, the first time alone and the second with Bazán, and defeated the fleet of the Pasha of Saloni.

In 1618, Osuna sent Ottavio with six galleys to raid the Dardanelles again, capturing two Turkish galleys in front of Constantinopla, and adding a series of captures in his way back to Sicily. He took his flotilla to Valencia, aware that the coast was raided by Morisco corsair Ali Zayde, previously named Antonio Cuartanet, who commanded a fleet of eight big carracks. Upon being sighted, Ottavio came out of Valencia and defeated him despite the inferiority of his own fleet, sinking one carrack and capturing five.

His close relationship with Osuna soured during a miscoordination during a visit to Marseille, where d'Aragona was forced to sail off leaving Osuna in port. They both sent letters to the court accusing each other, and Osuna came to the extent of challenging d'Aragona to a duel, which the latter accepted, but the court intervened to impede it. d'Aragona ended up in prison for five months, a fate shared by Osuna for several years. After being freed, d'Aragona returned to Naples and performed an assault in Modona in 1622, which became his last mission. He retired and died one year later.
