= Chergui =

Island off the coast of Tunisia

Coordinates: 34°44′8″N 11°12′27″E

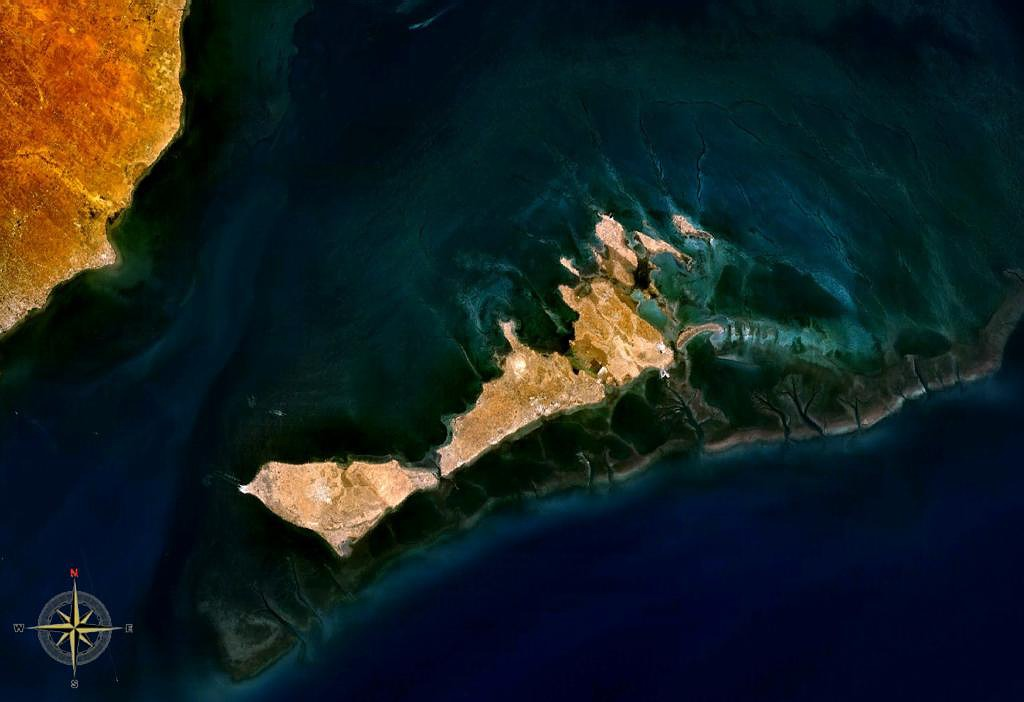
Landsat of Kerkennah Islands in Tunisia including Chergui Island

Chergui (Arabic: شرقي) is the largest of the Kerkennah Islands off the east coast of Tunisia. The name means "Easterner" in Arabic. The main town is Remla. The island has an area of 110 km^{2} (42 sq mi). The second largest island of the Kerkennah Islands group, Gharbi, means "Westerner" in Arabic.
