= Kraten =

Coordinates: 34°49′11″N 11°15′18″E

Kraten is a harbour town on the northern edge of the Kerkennah Islands of Tunisia. It is known for octopus fishing.

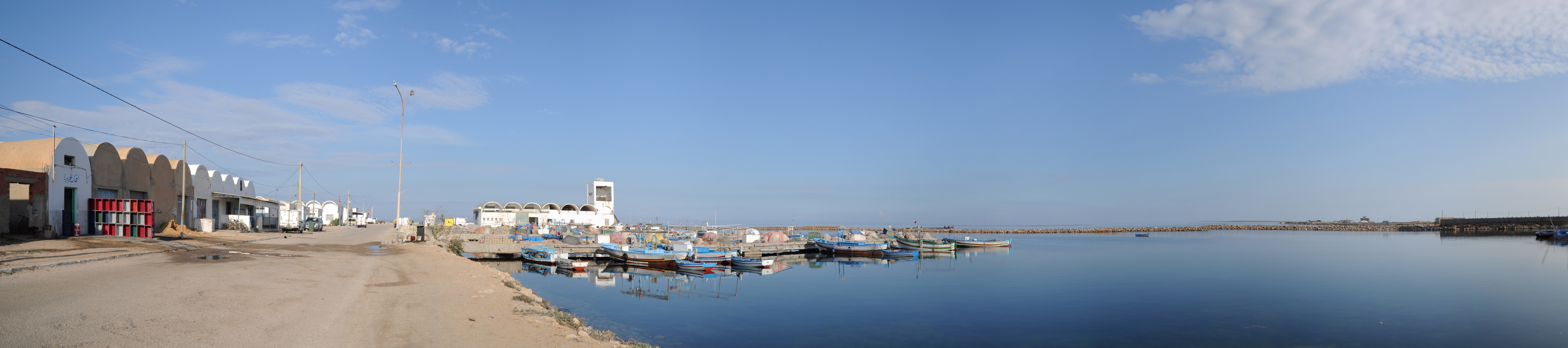
Panorama of part of Kraten harbour. January 2011.

== Tunisian revolution ==
The fishermen of Kraten partook in rescue operations for illegal immigrants to Europe (chiefly via Italy) whose boats failed to make the crossing in the aftermath of the Tunisian revolution in January 2011.
