= Battle of the Gulf of Tunis =

Naval battle between Spain and Ottoman Tunisia

- Part of Ottoman–Habsburg wars
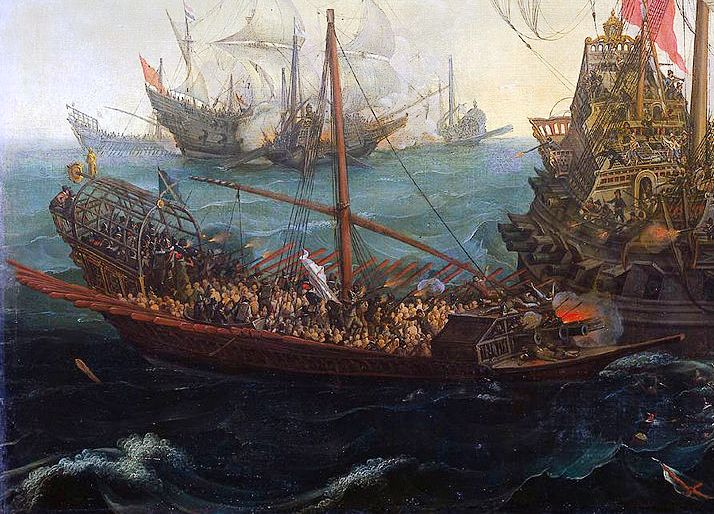
- Spanish galleys against Dutch galleons. Hendrick Cornelisz Vroom, 1602.
Date	June 4, 1624
Location	Gulf of Tunis, Ottoman Tunisia
Result	Spanish–Maltese victory

Belligerents
Spanish Empire; Order of St. John	Eyalet of Tunis

Commanders and leaders
Álvaro de Bazán y Benavides; Nicolo della Marra	Ali Arraez Rabazin

Strength
14 galleys	3 galleons

Casualties and losses
Minor	All vessels captured 212 prisoners Many dead

The Battle of the Gulf of Tunis was a naval battle between a Spanish and Maltese galley fleet, commanded by Álvaro de Bazán y Benavides, Marquis of Santa Cruz, and a Barbary corsair flotilla captained by Ali Arraez Rabazin.

== Background ==
In 1624, the spies of Viceroy of Sicily, Emmanuel Philibert of Savoy, spies found out that a Tunisian fleet had sailed off from Bizerte and joined another fleet from the Regency of Algiers, gathering 13 galleys which hounded around the North African coast. On May 21, Álvaro de Bazán y Benavides came out from Palermo in their search with 14 galleys, nine from Sicily, one from Spain and four from the Order of St. John, the latter commanded by Nicolo della Marra. After reaching Cape Bon in Tunis, he found in 24 May a 20-gun Dutch galleon coming from trading with Candia, which he captured and brought to Palermo before resuming his mission.

== Previous moves ==
He headed for Tunis again, and after leaving behind Cape Bon, he sent two scouts to La Goulette and Cape Farina, at the other sides of the gulf of Tunis, to learn about local privateering activity. Bazán then ran into three ships owned by Barbary corsair Ali Arraez Rabazin, known by the war name of "Samson", a Ferrarese renegade converted to Islam who harassed the coasts of Sicily, Naples and Spain. Rabazin had been a galley slave in Bazán's own ship, and now sailed in the service of Yusuf Dey of Tunis, having allegedly crammed a 30-ship fleet. The battle would be an inversion of the 1616 Battle of Cape Gelidonya, where a small Spanish galleon fleet faced a large Ottoman galley armada.

== Battle ==
On June 4, Bazán sighted a galleon sport Tunisian flag, and two other galleons joined it, turning out to be Rabazin's ships. The corsair accepted battle despite his large disadvantage in numbers, trusting the size and artillery of his three galleons, composed by a 40-gun Danish ship, a 28-gun French one and a 18-gun Flemish one, all of which he ordered to open fire. Bazán knew his own artillery pieces were fewer, but superior in quality, caliber and range, therefore he eschewed boarding and, forming his fleet in a half moon, opened fire on the Tunisians while keeping distance, so they would be rendered unable to hit him back. Bazán ordered the galleys to row forward into range to fire their cannons and back to reload.

Increasingly punished, Rabazin on against the encircling Bazán on the hope of ramming his way out of the gulf, but the Christian galleys surrounded him and overwhelmed his flagship with artillery fire, killing 100 of his 300-men crew. After six hours of battle, the Tunisian ships ran aground in the coast, where the enemy gunfire had pushed them while targeting their rigging and vulnerable sterns to leave them adrift. The crews started evacuating them against the orders of Rabazin, who urged them to stand firm and threatened them. Meanwhile, Bazán boarded the immobile ships with his galleys and launched skiffs and feluccas to capture the escapees on the beaches. During the boarding, Rabazin was captured by the knights of St. John after a duel against Spanish captain Diego Duque de Estrada, who got his rondache broken but capitalized on the range of his rapier to wound Rabazin in the head. The Christian crews overcome all the ships.

The galleons were taken along with the booty from their previous captures, which numbered around 300,000 pieces of eight without counting treasure and valuable cargo. Bazán ordered his captain Simón Costa to repair the galleons to take them back to Sicily, and distributed the corsair ships' booty among his crews as a prize for the victory. They freed 200 Christian hostages and made 212 prisoners, among them Rabazin, who was chained again, while the rest of his men either drowned or died in battle. They also found three Russian slavewomen whom Rabazin kept for himself. Bazán returned on June 9 to Palermo.

== Aftermath ==
The victory was celebrated with a parade in Palermo on June 9 due to Rabazin's past infamy among the locals. Duque de Estrada also a wrote a commemorative poem. Bazán failed to reach the corsair fleets from Tunis he was originally searching for, but he eventually tracked them to the Adriatic sea, where he captured a separate Barbary galleon and a fleet of brigantines. He found and destroyed the chased fleet in the Battle of the Dalmatian Coast.

== Bibliography ==
- Duque de Estrada, Diego (1860). Memorial histórico español: colección de documentos, opúsculos y antigüedades que publica la Real Academia de la Historia. Comentarios del desengañado · Tomo 12. Academia de la Historia.
- Fernández Duro, Cesáreo (1885). El gran duque de Osuna y su marina: jornadas contra turcos y venecianos (1602-1624). Sucesores de Rivadeneyra.
- Gómez, Antonio (2019). Con balas de plata VI. 1621-30. Difundia. ISBN 9788417799991.
- de la Guardia, Ricardo (1914). Notas para un Cronicón de la Marina Militar de España. Anales de trece siglos de historia de la marina. El Correo Gallego.
