= Conquest of Tunis =

Conquest, Capture or Siege of Tunis may refer to:

- Siege of Tunis (Mercenary War) (238 BC)
- Eighth Crusade (1270)
- Conquest of Tunis (1534), a conquest by the Ottomans
- Conquest of Tunis (1535), a conquest by Spain and the Holy Roman Empire
- Capture of Tunis (1569), a conquest by the Ottomans
- Conquest of Tunis (1573), a conquest by Spain
- Conquest of Tunis (1574), a conquest by the Ottomans
- Siege of Tunis (1694), a siege by the Regency of Algiers
- Capture of Tunis (1735), capture of the city by Algiers
- Capture of Tunis (1756), capture of the city by Algiers
- Operation Strike, a 1943 conquest by the Allies in World War II

== See also ==
- Battle of Tunis (disambiguation)
