= Battle of the Dalmatian Coast =

Battle between Spanish and Ottoman galleys near Dalmatia

- Part of Spanish–Ottoman wars and Ottoman–Habsburg wars
Date	July 13, 1624
Location	Off the coast of Dalmatia 43°22′44″N 16°51′36″E
Result	Spanish victory

Belligerents
Spanish Empire; Order of St. John; Republic of Genoa	Ottoman Empire; Eyalet of Tunis; Regency of Algiers

Commanders and leaders
Álvaro de Bazán y Benavides	Unknown

Strength
35 galleys	13 galleys

Casualties and losses
Unknown	6 galleys sunk 7 galleys captured

The Battle of the Dalmatian Coast of 1624 was a naval battle between a Spanish, Genoese and Maltese fleet captained by Álvaro de Bazán y Benavides, Marquis of Santa Cruz and a Barbary corsair fleet from Tunis and Algiers, originally pursued by him before the previous Battle of the Gulf of Tunis. It resulted in a Christian victory.

== Background ==
After defeating the privateer Ali Arraez Rabazin in Tunis while searching for the Tunisian fleet, Bazán sunk other two Barbary ships in Cape Farina before returning to hand over the prey to Sicily, after which they continued towards the Gulf of Venice. They learned that an allied fleet in the same gulf, composed by 14 Spanish galleys from Sicily and Naples and three from the Hospitaller Malta, had found the Barbary fleet previously searched by Bazán and cornered it against the coast of Dalmatia. The enemy fleet was composed of two Ottoman galleys from Rhodes, six Tunisian ones from Bizerte and five from Algiers. Viceroy of Sicily Emmanuel Philibert of Savoy immediately sent in Bazán with his previous 14 galleys, reinforced this time with four more from the Republic of Genoa that were by chance in Messina.

== Battle ==
Bazán and his armada arrived in Dalmatia on July 12 with speed thanks to favorable wind and rowing vigor, and upon arriving they made a council of war with the local fleet, deciding to attack the cornered enemies as soon as possible. With their enormous advantage in numbers and guns, the European galleys unloaded artillery at once against the Ottoman galleys, among which six of them were damaged and sank. The Christians then boarded the rest, unchaining galley slaves and making prisoners, before eventually capturing all the seven ships.

== Aftermath ==
The Christian armada divided the booty and prisoners, who numbered in 350, and embarked the rescued Christians, many of them Catalans taken in recent raids. One of the captured ships turned out to be the former flagship of the Spanish galley squad of Barcelona, taken by Barbary corsairs in a previous encounter. They also found out that another of the Turkish ships was carrying a female relative of the Sultan of the Ottoman Empire, Murad IV, taking her to Messina with the care appropriate to her rank.
