= Gharbi, Tunisia =

Coordinates: 34°39′N 11°02′E

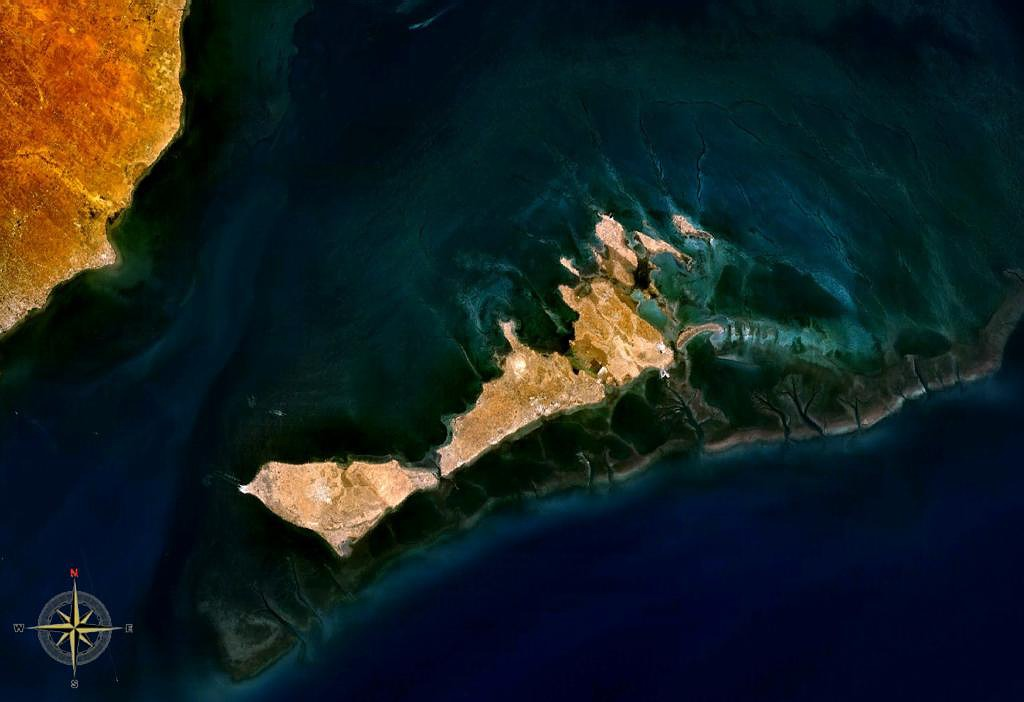
Landsat of Kerkennah Islands in Tunisia including Gharbi Island

Gharbi (Arabic: غربي) is the second largest of the Kerkennah Islands off the east coast of Tunisia. Chief town is Mellita. Located 20 km from the Sfax coast, the island has an area of 69 km^{2}. The name means "Westerner" in Arabic. The largest island of the group, Chergui, means "Easterner" in Arabic.
