= Remla =

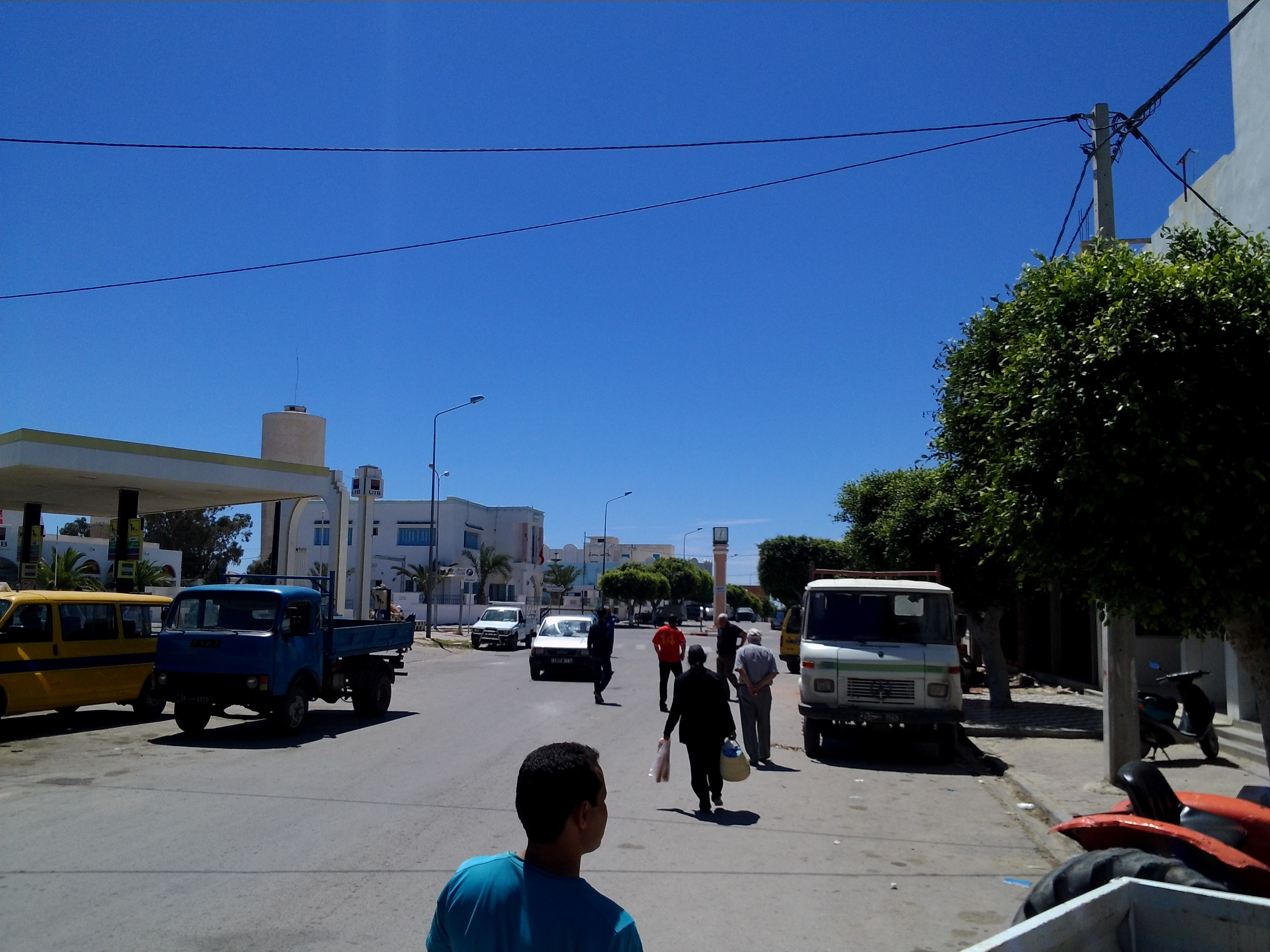

- Location in Tunisia
- Coordinates: 34°42′39″N 11°11′40″E
- Country: Tunisia
- Governorate: Sfax Governorate

Population (2014-04-23)Census
  - Total: 2,623
- Time zone: UTC1 (CET)

Remla (Arabic: رملة) is the main town of the Kerkennah Islands, Tunisia. It is part of the Sfax Governorate. A three-day Octopus Festival in March marks the start of the octopus fishing season.

The sector had a population of 2,623 as of Census 2014-04-23.
