= Diego Duque de Estrada =

Diego Duque de Estrada (August 15, 1589, in Toledo, Spain – 1647) was a Spanish memoir writer, soldier and adventurer.

== Biography ==
He was the son of Juan Duque de Estrada, also a soldier of rank. He was orphaned at a very young age and educated by a cousin. He was betrothed to his cousin's daughter while still young (a minor). One night, he found an intruder in the house, a gentleman with whom he was acquainted, and in a fit of jealousy, killed both him and the young lady. The prevailing code of honor was considered a sufficient justification for Estrada's violence, but the law looked upon the act as a vulgar assassination, and he had to flee.

After leading a vagabond life in the south of Spain, he was arrested at Ecija, brought to Toledo, and tortured with extreme ferocity to extort a general confession as to his life during the past months. He had the strength not to yield to pain and was finally able to escape from prison, partly by the help of a nun in a religious house which faced the prison and partly by the intervention of friends. He went to Naples, where he entered the service of the Duke of Osuna, who was, at that time, viceroy.

Duque de Estrada saw a good deal of fighting both with the Turks and the Venetians; he was employed by the viceroy in the conspiracy against Venice as one of the disguised Spanish soldiers sent into the town to destroy the arsenal but who were warned in time that the conspiracy had been betrayed, and therefore escaped. After the fall of his patron, Duque de Estrada resumed his vagabond life and served under Bethlen Gábor in Transylvania and the Thirty Years' War.

In 1633, he entered the order of San Juan de Dios and died at some time after 1637 (1647?) in Sardinia, where he is known to have taken part in the defence of the island against an attack by the French.

He left a book of memoirs, entitled Comentarios de el desengenado de Si Mismo prueba de todos estados, y eleccíon del Mejor de ellos ("The Commentaries of one who knew his little worth, the touchstone of all the state of man, and the choice of the best"). They were written at different times, and parts have been lost. His style is inaccurate and inexact, and it would be unsafe to trust his memoirs in every detail. Still, they are amazingly vivid and contain a wonderful picture of the moral and intellectual state of a large part of Spanish society at the time. Don Pascual de Gayangos reprinted the memoirs in the Memorial Histórico Español, vol. xii. (Madrid, 1860).
