= Raid on La Goulette (1612) =

Spanish raid on Ottoman Tunisia

- Part of Spanish–Ottoman wars
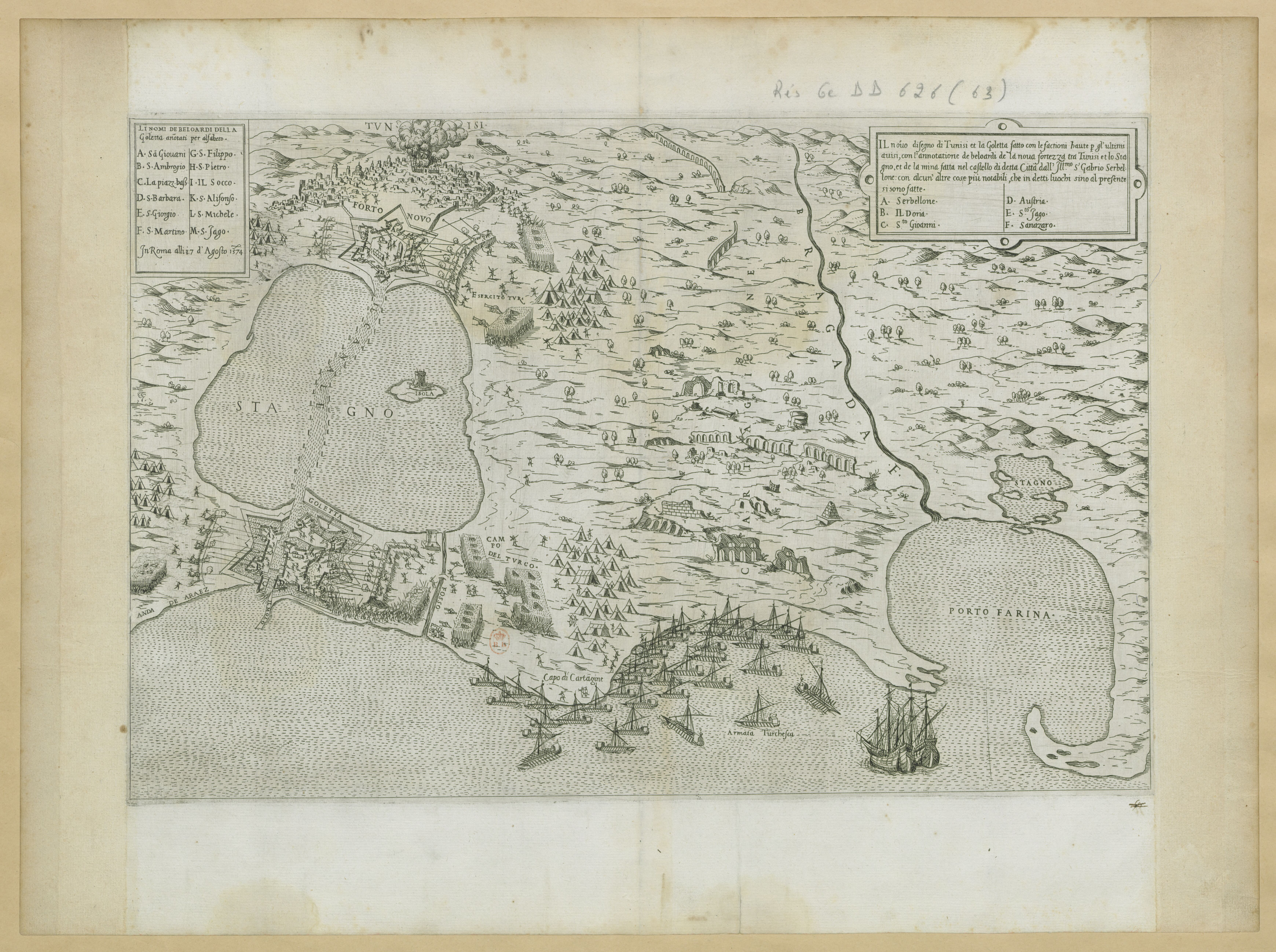
- Tunis and La Goulette in the 17th century.
Date	May 23, 1612
Location	Halq al-Wadi, Ottoman Tunisia
Result	Spanish victory

Belligerents
Spanish Empire	Eyalet of Tunis

Commanders and leaders
Antonio Pimentel	Zymen Danseker

Strength
6 galleys	10 ships

Casualties and losses
Minor	7 vessels destroyed 3 vessels captured Many dead

The raid on La Goulette of 1612 was a naval attack by Spanish captain Antonio Pimentel over La Goulette, the main port of Ottoman Tunisia. The raid destroyed a local fleet of western ships built by French privateer Zymen Danseker, who had planned to use it to spread Barbary pirate activity to the Spanish territories in America.

== Background ==
In 1612, the galleys of Viceroy of Sicily, Pedro Téllez-Girón, Duke of Osuna got hold of an Ottoman spy in Catania, who revealed that Zymen Danseker, a Dutch privateer in the service of France, was working along with the Ottoman Tunisia to build a fleet of western-style sailing ships, complete with Ottoman and Dutch crews, which they planned to use to transverse the Atlantic and spread piratic action to the Spanish American territories. Osuna recognized this as a threat, especially given that Danser had already provided the Regency of Algiers with western ships which had proved hard to defeat by the Spanish and Italian galleys.

Obtaining emergency resources from the Parliament of Messina to deal with the threat as quickly as possible, Osuna called up captain Antonio Pimentel, as well as Hernando de Aledo, a veteran of the Eighty Years' War experienced in amphibious warfare, and planned for them to infiltrate Tunisia with a contingent of the Spanish Marine Infantry and destroy Danser's armada. Pimentel set off with six galleys.

== Battle ==
Helped by a favorable weather, Pimentel arrived incognito at the Tunisian coast, where he waited until midnight before disembarking with 100 men in chalupas. They silently approached Danser's armada, and after identifying three of the ten ships as loaded with booty from previous captures, they employed incendiary devices to set the other seven on fire. Danser and the privateers slept on board with little alertness, and when they realized the commotion, they panicked and many of them jumped overboard to escape the fire.

Capitalizing on the subsequent confusion, Pimentel and his soldiers seized the three loaded ships, including a huge, 1,000-ton nao which was probably Danser's treasure ship and two smaller vessels, and escaped with them. Artillery fired against them, too late to cause more than a few casualties, and upon daybreak they left Tunisia with the captured ships and the six galleys while the rest of Danser's armada was destroyed by the fire, killing many crewmen who could not escape. The fire spread inland and caused much damage.

== Aftermath ==
Away from Tunisia, Pimentel contacted a squad of seven galleys of Naples commanded by Álvaro de Bazán y Benavides, who was on an identical mission to destroy Tunisian shipyards and armories recently built in Bizerte. Deciding not to return to Sicily without helping Bazán, Pimentel joined him with his fleet and attacked Bizerte in a two-pronged assault, sacking the city, destroying the targets and setting the place on fire. In this new attack they lost 10 men in exchange for over 500 enemies, capturing hundreds of prisoners. As a last prey on the way back home, they burned an African brigantine near Bona.

Their success was received in Sicily with great celebration. Osuna sent part of the gained booty to the court, including prisoners and horses taken in the sackings, as well as rich gifts as bribes in order to ease his mandate in the future. Adventurers from several nations would travel to Sicily in order to join Osuna, who would soon start building his own private fleet of saling ships. This fleet would perform a new raid on La Goulette in 1615 under the command of Francisco de Ribera, who later achieved a decisive victory against the Ottoman navy in the Battle of Cape Gelidonya.

== Bibliography ==
- De Armiñán, Luis (1948). El Gran Duque de Osuna. Gran Capitán.
- Canales, Carlos; Rey, Miguel (2019). Naves mancas: la Armada Española a vela de Cabo Celidonia a Trafalgar. EDAF. ISBN 978-84-414-2879-9.
- Fernández Duro, Cesáreo (2006). El gran duque de Osuna y su marina: jornadas contra turcos y venecianos (1602–1624) (in Spanish). Spain: Editorial Renacimiento. ISBN 978-84-8472-126-0.
- San Juan Sánchez, Víctor (2018). Breve historia de las batallas navales del Mediterráneo. Nowtilus. ISBN 9788499679365.
