= Kerkennah Islands =

Islands off the east coast of Tunisia

Native name:
قرقنة (Arabic)
- - Standard Arabic: qarqna
Κέρκιννα(Greek)
- - Κέρκιννα: Cercinna
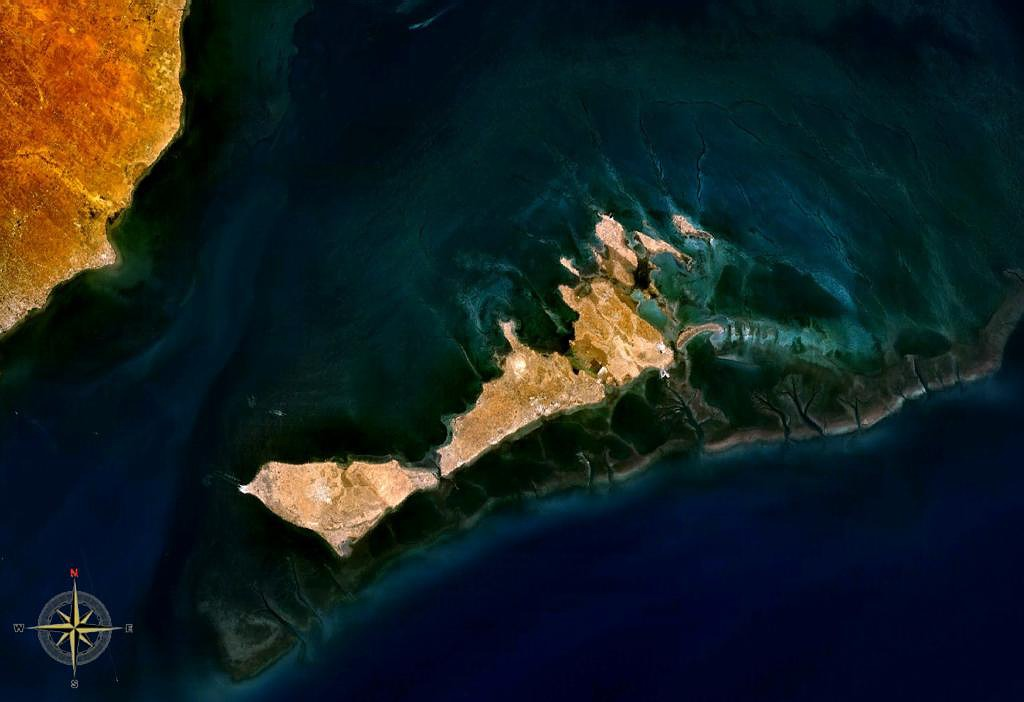
- Kerkennah Islands seen from space

- Location within Tunisia

Geography
- Coordinates: 34°42′N 11°11′E
- Archipelago: Mediterranean Sea
- Area: 160 km^{2} (62 sq mi)

Administration
- Tunisia

Demographics
- Demonym: Kerkennian
- Population: 16,439 (2022-04-23)

Kerkennah Islands (Tunisian Arabic: قرقنة qarqna; Ancient Greek: Κέρκιννα [Kérkinna]; Spanish: Querquenes) are a group of islands lying off the east coast of Tunisia in the Gulf of Gabès and to the east of Sfax, at 34°42′N 11°11′E. The Islands are low-lying, being no more than 13 metres (43 feet) above sea level. The main islands are Chergui and Gharbi. The archipelago has an area of 160 square kilometres (62 mi^{2}) and a population of 15,501 (2014).

== History ==
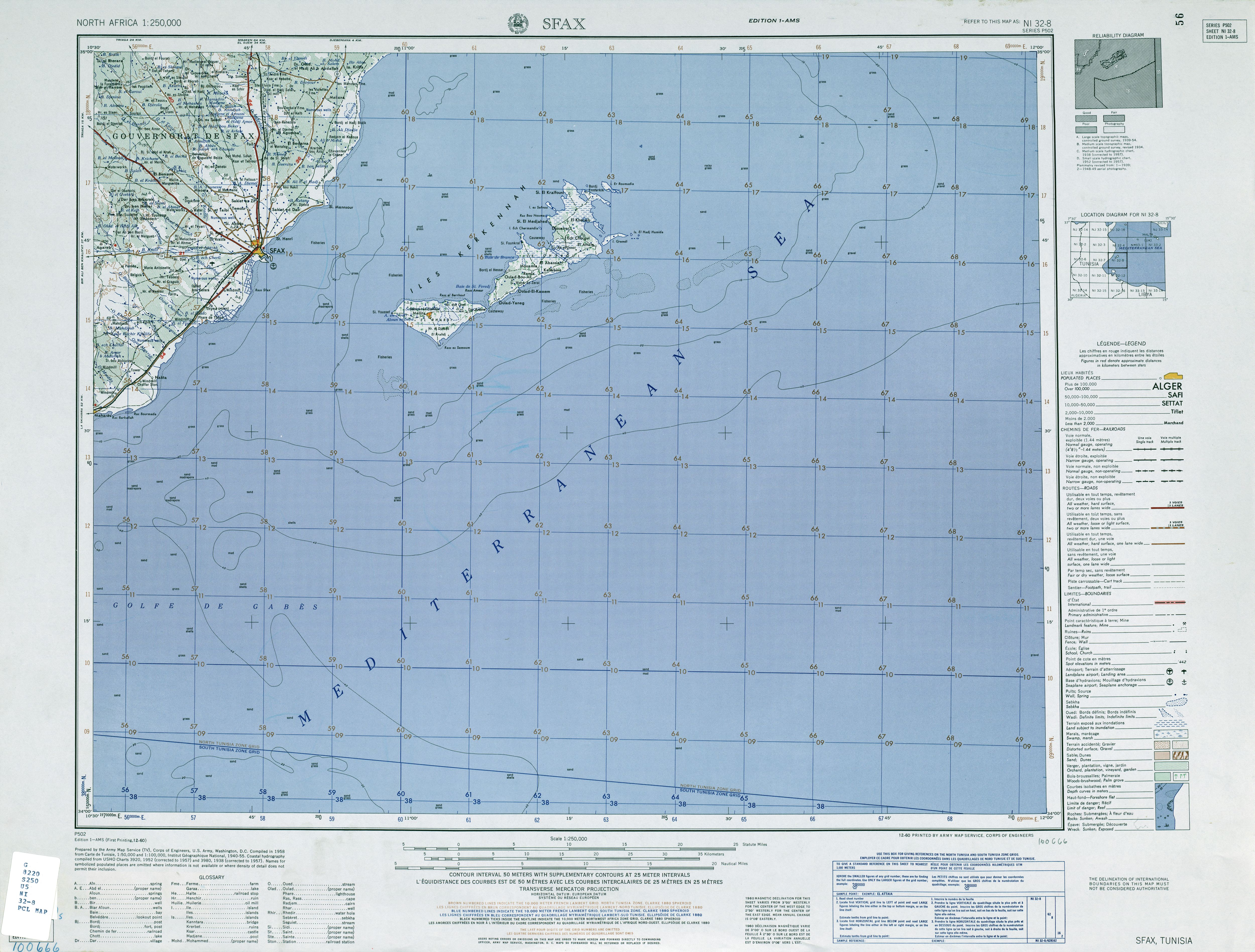
Map including the Kerkennah Islands (AMS, 1958)

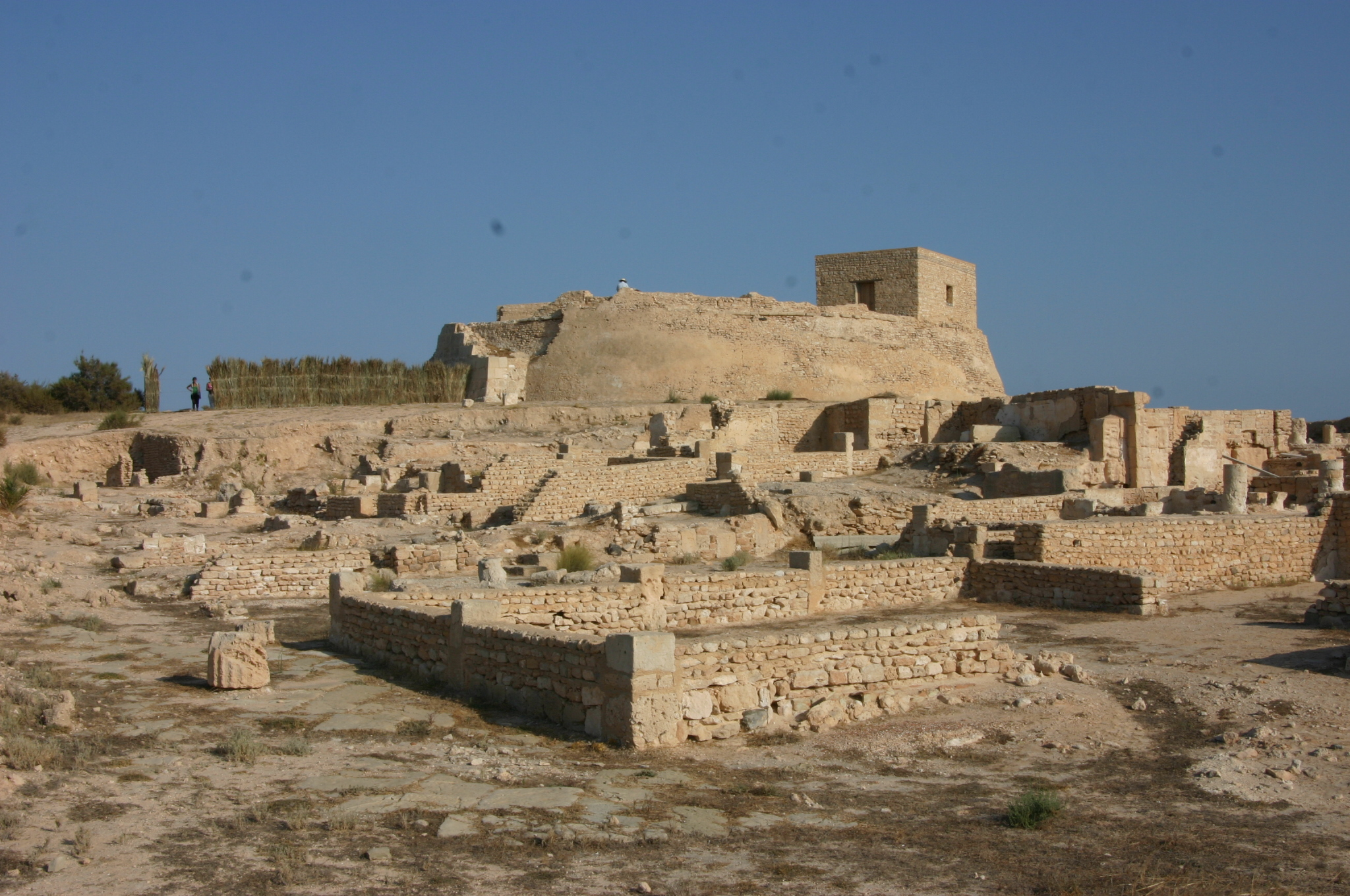
Archaeological remains at Bordj El Hassar in 2007

The natives of Tunisia and Kerkennah originally settled there, but during the spread of the Roman Empire, Kerkennah was used as a port and look-out point by the Romans, to keep note of off-shore activity. In 2 BC, Augustus exiled Sempronius Gracchus, a lover of Julia the Elder, to the islands for 14 years for his indiscretions with his then-married daughter. Greeks called it Cercina (Ancient Greek: Κέρκινα) and Cercinna (Ancient Greek: Κέρκιννα). Strabo and Ptolemaeus wrote that the city that was on the island was also called Cercinna (Ancient Greek: Κέρκιννα), same as the island.

Among the Catholic bishops whom the Arian Vandal king Huneric summoned to Carthage in 484, was a Bishop Athenius of Cercina, the seat of the bishopric being in the most easterly island of the group. No longer a residential bishopric, Cercina is today listed by the Catholic Church as a titular see.

It was proposed to locate the monastery built in 532 by Saint Fulgentius of Ruspe on one of the islets of the group, but it was more recently argued for an identification on the Kneiss island.

In 1424, the Kerkennah Islands were raided by an Aragonese expedition.

During the Second World War, the Battle of the Tarigo Convoy was fought near the islands on 16 April 1941.

The population of the islands significantly decreased during the 1980s due to drought. The islands were unable to provide suitable irrigation systems and, with clean water rapidly running out, many islanders were forced to leave for mainland Tunisia, the nearest city being Sfax.

== Demographics ==
Kerkennah's main town, Remla (on Chergui), had a population of 2,623 as of Census 2014-04-23.

== Geography ==
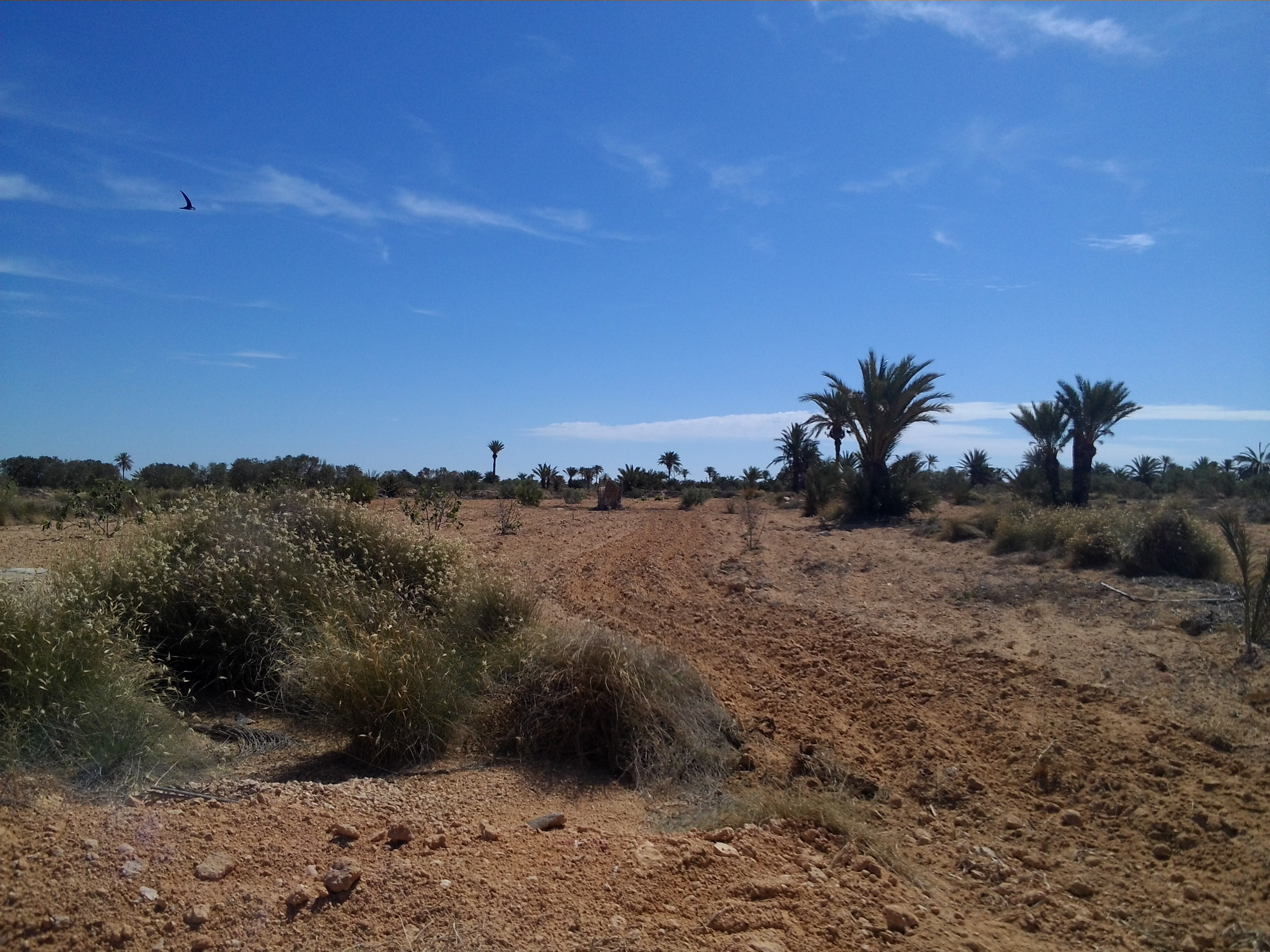
Arid landscape on the Kerkennah Islands

The islands are warm and dry, with strong prevailing winds. This is mainly due to its positioning in the Gulf of Gabes, with strong sea winds (Gharbi), carried over the mainland, making them hot and dry. What little water vapour there is, is lost over cooler Tunisia first. This causes the general ecology of the island to mainly consist of tall xerophytic (and often halophytic) flora, such as palms and saltbushes.

The land is arid and there is little agriculture, though the islanders own chickens and goats for their personal consumption. Fishing, especially for octopus, is a key industry of Kerkennah, whence it is exported to mainland Tunisia and nearby countries.

Tourism is limited in Kerkennah and it lacks grandiose sandy beaches. Many mainland Tunisians spend their holidays in Kerkennah, and many more affluent Tunisians often build private second homes on the island. Tourists also come from European countries. Temperatures on the island are high, with a minimum of 4 °C (39 °F) and often reaching 40 °C (104 °F).

The north includes a port known as Kraten.

== Wildlife ==
The whole archipelago is an important wintering area for migratory birds. BirdLife International classifies the Kerkennah Islands as a particularly critical Important Bird Area (code TN026) as it constitutes a major migration bottleneck (category A4i) and it hosts at time significant populations of some species whose distribution is mostly confined to the Mediterranean North-African biome (i.e., category A3).

In terms of winter-migrating birds, great cormorants, gulls and terns are the most striking. For the great cormorant Phalacrocorax carbo between 1,000 and 10,000 individuals can be counted some winters (the migration route can depend on the amount of rains for a given year). For gulls and terns, notable species including slender-billed gull Larus genei, lesser black-backed gull Larus fuscus, Caspian gull Larus cachinnans, Caspian tern Sterna caspia and Sandwich tern Sterna sandvicensis.

The islands constitute a critical migration bottleneck for 3 species: the previously mentioned great cormorants, the Eurasian spoonbill (400–800 individuals) and the greater flamingo (400–1,500 individuals).

In addition, the following seven species that are mostly restricted to the Mediterranean North African biome see significant populations migrate through the Kerkennah (BirdLife conservation criteria A3): Barbary partridge Alectoris barbara, Moussier's redstart Phoenicurus moussieri, Western black-eared wheatear Oenantha hispanica, Sardinian warbler Sylvia melanocephalia, Eastern subalpine warbler Sylvia cantillans, spectacled warbler Sylvia conspicillata and the spotless starling Sturnus unicolor.

Finally, some species do not simply pass through but breed on Kerkenah, such as the common kestrel Falco tinnunculus, the cream-coloured courser Cursorius cursor, the European bee-eater Merops apiaster and the Great grey shrike Lanius excubitor.

Aside from these birds, the islands are also an important stop-over site each spring and autumn for hundreds of thousands of migrant passerines. All the islands are classified as hunting reserve, meaning that the hunting of game, including birds, is only allowed at specific times and under license.

The Kerkennah Islands gerbil, Gerbillus simoni zakariai is a subspecies of Gerbillus simoni endemic to the archipelago.

== See also ==
- Océano Club de Kerkennah
