= Álvaro de Bazán, 2nd Marquess of Santa Cruz =

Spanish military leader

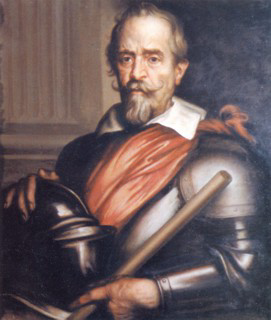
Álvaro de Bazán y Benavides

Álvaro de Bazán, 2nd Marquess of Santa Cruz (also known as Álvaro de Bazán y Benavides or Alvaro II de Bazán; 12 September 1571 – 1646), was the son of Álvaro de Bazán, 1st Marquess of Santa Cruz.

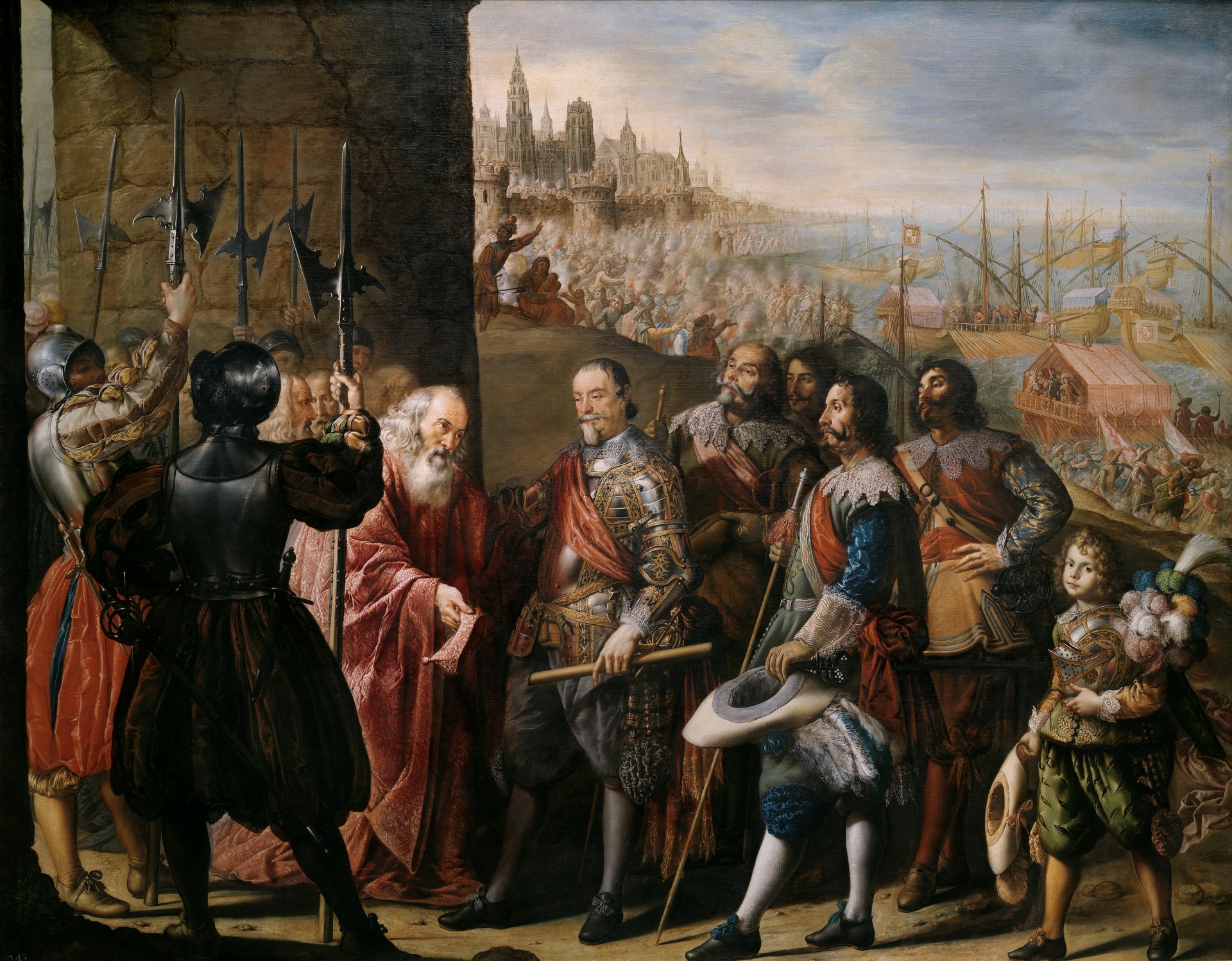
Relief of Genoa by the Marquess of Santa Cruz by Antonio de Pereda

== Life and career ==
He was born on 1571 in Naples. Not as famous as his father, Álvaro II had nevertheless a distinguished military career, as well as on land as on sea.

He was Governor of the Duchy of Milan (1630–1631), Maestro de Campo General in Flanders under the Governess of the Spanish Netherlands Isabel Clara Eugenia (1631), a Spanish Navy commander and Army land General during the Thirty Years War, Member of the Spanish Councils of War and the State Council, Marquess of El Viso, Lord of Valdepeñas, and a Grandee of Spain.

Álvaro II main military actions were:

- 1596 Defense of Cádiz against the attack of the English Fleet sent by Queen Elizabeth I of England.
- 1602 At Sesimbra Bay commanding three galleys where he was defeated by an English fleet under William Monson and Richard Leveson.
- 1603 Captain General of the Galleys of the kingdom of Naples.
- 1604 Naval actions in the Mediterranean African Coast, Longo Island.
- 1605 Siege and Conquest of Estarcho and the City of Durazzo, on the Albanian Coast (in 1606)
- 1611 In September, he sacked the Kerkennah Islands.
- 1612 In May, commanding the Naples kingdom fleet of galleys, with Ottavio d'Aragona commanding those of the kingdom of Sicily, sunk several Barbary corsair galleys from Algiers. Later into the year, he raided Bizerte along with a squad of Sicily led by Antonio Pimentel, coming from raiding La Goulette.
- 1614 Took part in the transport to North Africa of morisco's from Spain not willing to become Roman Catholics while living in mainland Spain.
- 1622 Took part in an African expedition.
- 1624 Destroyed three consecutives Barbary corsair flotillas in the naval battles of Palermo, the Gulf of Tunis and the Dalmatian Coast.
- 1625 Relieved Genoa under siege from the France and the Duchy of Savoy. His action was immortalized in the painting Relief of Genoa by the Marquess of Santa Cruz (1634) by Antonio de Pereda
- 1629 Commander of the Mediterranean Galleys.
- 1630–1631 Appointed Governor of the Duchy of Milan on the death of Ambrosio Spinola.
- 1631 General Governor of the Army of Flanders.
- 1636 He fought under Melchor de Borja in Corsica, defeating a fleet of Dutch galleons.

He was married in 1590, in Almagro, Spain, to Guiomar Manrique de Lara. Their descendants included two sons and five daughters.

== Evolution of the title since the middle of the 17th century ==
Coat of Arms of the Marquessess of Santa Cruz, title awarded by King Philip II of Spain on 11 October 1569

- Mauro Álvaro, the eldest male, was 3rd Marques, marrying on 22 October 1627, Genoese noble woman Maria Francesca Doria, a daughter of Carlo I Doria del Carretto, 1st Duke of Tursi, a Grandee of Spain with many other lesser titles, (Genoa, Italy, 15 October 1576 – Genoa, Italy, 19 December 1649) and Placidia Spinola, (1584–1660), 2nd Marchioness of Calice and Veppo, between other titles. No surviving adult issue.
- The 4th Marchioness, was the eldest sister of the 2nd Marquess Álvaro II, named Maria Eugenia de Bazán y Benavides. She was married in 1620 to Jerónimo Pimentel, Marquis of Bayona, Viceroy of Sardinia, 1626–1631, deceased 15 April 1631, with issue. He was the 8th son of Juan Alonso Pimentel de Herrera, 5th Duke of Benavente, deceased 7 November 1621, Viceroy of Valencia, 1598–1602, Viceroy of Naples, 1603–1610. The other male of the family, Fernando, became Chancellor, Rector, of the University of Salamanca, and later, after ecclesiastical jobs at Seville and Córdoba, Archbishop of Palermo, Sicily, Italy.
- Thus, the title of Marquess of Santa Cruz became attached to a branch of the Pimentel family, a female called Mencia Pimentel y Bazan. When she married a "Benavides" male, it was agreed by the couple that if they had a male, the male child would be named Francisco Diego de Bazan y Benavides to honor her ancestors and "recuperate" her ancestors name, something not uncommon between the High Spanish Nobility.
- In fact, a son was born and named Francisco de Bazan y Benavides (died in 1680). He was Captain General of the Spanish galleys and Viceroy of Sicily, (1674 Interim), using always his mother's ancestors' family name, "Bazán", as a token of respect, and possibly, duty.

Government offices
Preceded by Ambrogio Spinola, 1st Marquess of Balbases	Governor of the Duchy of Milan; 1630-1631	Succeeded by Gómez Suárez de Figueroa, 3rd Duke of Feria
Spanish nobility
Preceded by Álvaro de Bazán	Marquess of Santa Cruz; 1588–1646	Succeeded by Álvaro de Bazán
