= Pedro Téllez-Girón, 3rd Duke of Osuna =

Spanish nobleman and politician

Pedro Téllez-Girón y Velasco Guzmán y Tovar 3rd Duke of Osuna 4th Marquess of Peñafiel 7th Count of Ureña Knight of the Golden Fleece Lord of Olvera
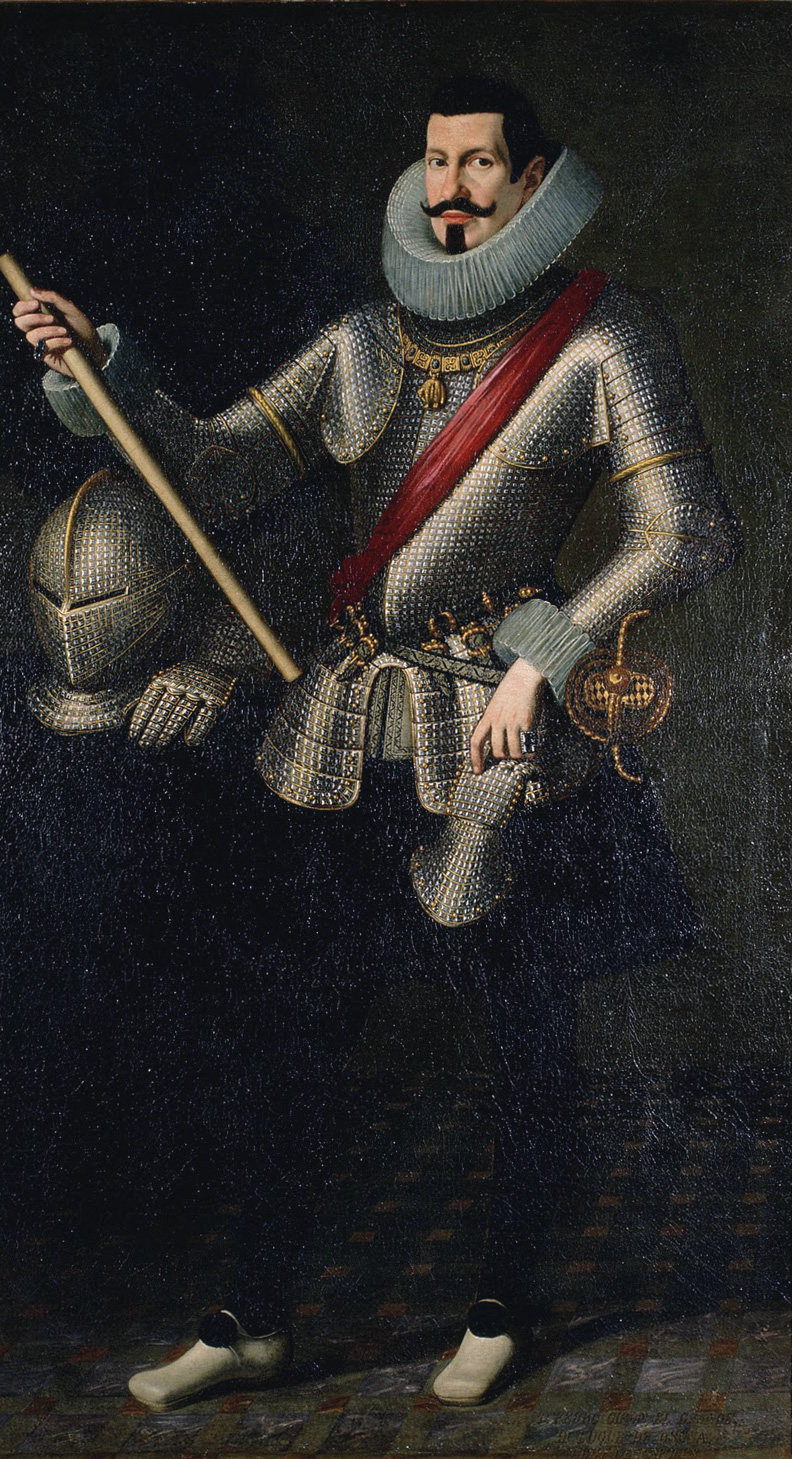
- Pedro Téllez-Girón, 3rd Duke of Osuna, by Bartolomé González y Serrano
- Born: 17 December 1574; Osuna, Castile
- Died: 24 September 1624 (aged 49); Barajas, Castile
- Spouse: Catalina Enríquez de Ribera
- Children: Juan Tellez-Girón y Enriquez de Ribera, 4th Duke of Osuna
- Relatives: Juan Téllez-Girón y Guzmán (father); Anna Maria Fernández de Velasco (mother)
- Military career
- Allegiance: Spanish Empire
- Branch: Spanish Army; Spanish Navy
- Service years: 1602–1620
- Rank: Viceroy of Sicily; Viceroy of Naples
- Conflicts: Ottoman–Habsburg wars: Battle of Cape Gelidonya; Raid on Constantinople; Venetian-Habsburg conflicts: Battle of Ragusa

Viceroy of Sicily
- In office 2 April 1611 – July 1616
- Monarch: Philip III
- Preceded by: Giovanni Doria (as acting)
- Succeeded by: Giovanni Doria (as acting)

Viceroy of Naples
- In office July 1616 – 4 June 1620
- Monarch: Philip III
- Preceded by: Pedro Fernández de Castro, Count of Lemos
- Succeeded by: Gaspar de Borja y Velasco

Pedro Téllez-Girón, 3rd Duke of Osuna (17 December 1574 – 24 September 1624) was a Spanish nobleman and politician. He was the 2nd Marquis of Peñafiel, 7th Count of Ureña, Spanish Viceroy of Sicily (1611–1616), Viceroy of Naples (1616–1620), a Knight of the Order of the Golden Fleece since 1608, Grandee of Spain, member of the Spanish Supreme Council of War, and the subject of several poems by his friend, counselor and assistant, Francisco de Quevedo.

He served as a footsoldier and climbed the ranks, an unusual career for an aristocrat, during the Eighty Years' War. As Viceroy of Sicily and Naples, Osuna reorganized the local administration with new strategies and ships, and implemented a highly profitable and successful privateering system against the Ottoman Empire, the Republic of Venice and the Barbary corsairs. Despite counting solely on local resources, he maintained Spanish dominance in the Mediterranean during the ten years of his mandates, producing victories like Cape Corvo, Cape Gelidonya, Constantinople and Ragusa. At his peak, his individual naval power is believed to have rivaled that of the Sultan of the Ottoman Empire.

Although a favourite of King Philip III, he faced much obstruction from his court, which he ameliorated by buying political influence with booty from his campaigns. Osuna was eventually deposed in 1620, undoing most of his work, in midst of the instability caused by the fall of the royal minister Francisco de Sandoval, Duke of Lerma. Venetians claimed Osuna had participated in a conspiracy to take over Venice, while the Neapolitan aristocracy purported he intended to secede from Spain and become King of Naples. He denied all accusations and died in prison while awaiting judgement.

== Early life ==
He was born in Osuna, province of Sevilla, and baptized on 18 January 1575, the son of Juan Téllez-Girón, 2nd Duke of Osuna, and of his wife Ana María de Velasco, daughter of Íñigo Fernández de Velasco, 4th Duke of Frías and Constable of Castile.

According to the first biography published in 1699 by the Protestant Milanese Gregorio Leti, which has been until the 20th century the main and most exploited source of information on the third Duke of Osuna, when a boy he accompanied his grandfather, the 1st duke, Viceroy of Naples (1582–1586). But this, as many other pieces of information, anecdotes, speeches and stories of Leti's biography are doubtful nowadays; the same happens with his alleged participation, in the royal expedition to Zaragoza to put down the Aragonese revolt in 1588 as by then he was only aged 13.

Pedro Téllez-Girón married Catalina Enríquez de Ribera y Cortés on 17 January 1594. In April 1594 he inherited the dukedom Afán de Ribera.

Although deeply indebted, the estate of Osuna came under the Council of Castile administration because of his young age, to avoid money mismanagements. The estate of Osuna was only second by total wealth in Spain to that of the Duke of Medina Sidonia.

In 1602, apparently with the agreement of Juan Fernández de Velasco, 5th Duke of Frías, Constable of Castile, his uncle and political godfather and one of the most powerful and outstanding personalities of the reign of King Philip III of Spain, Osuna escaped from his confinement in the castle of Cuéllar, a place/prison used for the last two centuries to control "illustrious" Crown guests accompanied by a servant, arriving in Brussels in October of that year.

== Military career ==
Initially, he enlisted in the army of the Archduke Albert of Austria as a private, but soon he was given the command of two cavalry companies. In 1602 and 1603 he had a role in controlling and defusing the mutinies which erupted in Brabant among the armies of the Archduke, even financing the arrangements with the mutineers with his own money, raised in Flanders with the guarantee of his Spanish properties. Besides, he took part in several important battles, being seriously wounded twice.

Another of Leti's legends says that in 1604 he went to London, as a member of the embassy sent by king Philip III of Spain to king James I Stuart to sign the Treaty of Peace, the ambassador being the Constable of Castile, the later assessment being indeed true.

In 1608, when the negotiations for the 12 years truce between Maurice of Nassau and Ambrogio Spinola within the Eighty Years War had already begun in The Hague, he took no part as he was against them. He returned to Spain as a hero, being decorated in 1608 with the Order of the Golden Fleece, the highest decoration given by the King of Spain as head of the Habsburg dynasty.

In 1608 he arranged the marriage of his son, Juan, with the daughter of Cristóbal de Sandoval, Duke of Uceda, the son and assistant of Francisco Gómez de Sandoval y Rojas, Duke of Lerma, the Prime Minister and Valido of king Philip III of Spain. The political meaning of such an agreement was indeed that he was accepted as a member of the Lerma's family and group of friends, the real ruling elite of the Spanish monarchy at the time, till he was displaced around 1621 by his political enemy, Gaspar de Guzmán, Count-Duke of Olivares.

== In Italy ==
=== As viceroy of Sicily ===
On 18 September 1610 he was named viceroy of Sicily, and took possession of his post at Milazzo on 9 March 1611. During his Sicilian viceroyalty he organized a squadron of galleys for the Royal Navy but also his own corsair fleet.

He launched several successful expeditions against Berber pirates and harbours, as well as against the Turks. In 1613 Ottavio d'Aragona was victorious in the Battle of Cape Corvo. In 1616, the commander of the royal Sicilian fleet, Francisco de Rivera y Medina, achieved another important victory against Turkish galleys in the Battle of Cape Celidonia. Aragona later performed a raid on Constantinople, the capital city of the Ottoman Empire. Overall, Osuna set up a sizable naval force in Sicily and reinforced the military might of the island.

=== As viceroy of Naples ===
In 1616 he was promoted to viceroy of Naples, and held the office until June 1620. The main problem for Spain in Italy was French and Savoyard ambitions on the Duchy of Milan, a key territory from the strategic point of view to maintain military communications between Spain and the Low Countries and other Habsburg territories in Europe.

Between 1613 and 1618 Spain and Savoy were at war (War of the Montferrat Succession), the former trying to contain the Duke of Savoy within the boundaries established after the Treaty of Cateau-Cambrésis (1559). Osuna clashed against the Neapolitan nobility due to the extraction of taxes to supply the necessary armies. Given that the main provider of financial help to Savoy was the Republic of Venice, Osuna proposed that destroying the Venetian dominion of the Adriatic gulf and even conquering Venice itself was convenient and feasible.

In May 1618 the Venetian authorities claimed to have uncovered a conspiracy to sack the city and burn the arsenal. They summarily executed a number of alleged participants, all of them French, but insinuated the plot was hatched by Osuna and the Spanish ambassador to Venice, the Marquis of Bedmar.

The end of Osuna's government in Naples was very confused and tense. On the one hand, the nobility of Naples was increasingly hostile to Osuna, one of the main reasons being the economic burden imposed by the need to feed and lodge the big military force (12,000 soldiers) that Osuna had lodged in the city without the agreement of its representative bodies. On the other, because of Osuna's support to the political demands of the representatives of the low classes, "the people". In June 1620 the new temporary Viceroy, Cardinal Borja, former ambassador to Rome, took possession of the Viceroyalty against all formal rules, but Osuna accepted the authority of Borja and returned obediently to Madrid.

== Fall and death ==
A few days after Philip III's death, in 1621, in a 'purge' by the ministers of the new and very young king against Lerma's family and friends, Osuna was arrested by a decision of the State Council – the highest political and administrative body of the Spanish Monarchy – on a large and wide-ranging array of accusations (corruption, but also impiety, sexual misconduct, etc.). He remained under house arrest (imprisoned in castles or noble houses) until his death in September 1624. The purge was actively promoted by the new Royal prime minister, Gaspar de Guzmán, Count-Duke of Olivares.

No sentence was ever pronounced, but the House of Osuna was out of the royal favour for three decades, and only during the reign of Charles II did it again play an important role in Spanish political life.

== See also ==
- The Spanish Viceroy

== Notes ==
Government offices
Preceded by Giovanni Doria	Viceroy of Sicily; 1611–1616	Succeeded by Francisco Ruiz de Castro
Preceded by Pedro Fernández de Castro, Count of Lemos	Viceroy of Naples; 1616–1620	Succeeded by Gaspar de Borja y Velasco
Spanish nobility
Preceded by Juan Téllez-Girón, 2nd Duke of Osuna	Duke of Osuna; 1600–1624	Succeeded by Juan Téllez-Girón, 4th Duke of Osuna
