= Cesáreo Fernández Duro =

Spanish Navy officer and historian (1830–1908)

Capitán Cesáreo Fernández Duro
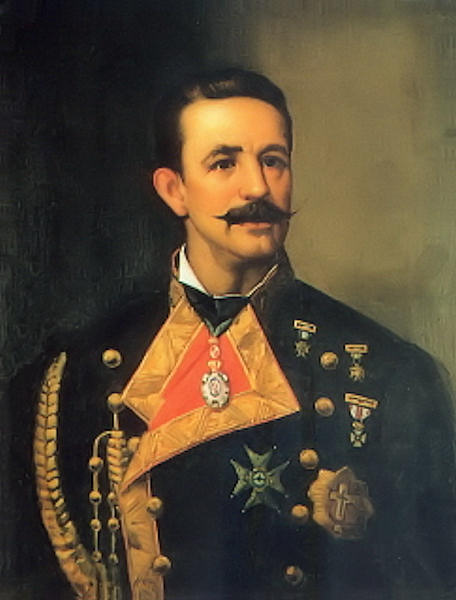
- Portrait of Fernández Duro
- Born: 25 February 1830
- Died: 5 June 1908 (aged 78); Madrid
- Resting place: Panteón de Marinos Ilustres, San Fernando

Cesáreo Fernández Duro (25 February 1830 – 5 June 1908) was a Spanish Navy officer and historian.

== Childhood and family background ==
Fernández Duro was born into a good family in Zamora; that is to say, a noble family. His father, Francisco Fernández Torneros, a lawyer, was entitled to use Don before his name, which means that his mother, Teresa Ramona Duro, was a Doña (Latin Dominus and Domina, "master" and "mistress.") Cesáreo was a Don, no doubt, but history prefers for him his rank at retirement from the navy, Capitán. Fernández Duro was baptized in the parish of San Andrés, where the family must have lived. The church was the social center of the parish. At some time during the next 15 years he received a primary education (reading writing, and arithmetic), probably several years' worth. The dates vary in the sources. The formal schooling took place at Madrid, to which the family moved temporarily, probably for the purpose. His very attendance at school is a strong indication of his membership in the aristocracy.

== Naval career ==
At the age of 15 years, in 1845, Fernández Duro became a candidate in the Naval School of San Fernando. In 1847 he shipped as a midshipman on the Isabel II, sailing in the Caribbean for three years. In 1851 he embarked on the Villa de Bilbao for the Philippines, where he took part in the Jornada de Joló (Day of Joló), near the island of Joló, now Sulu), in the Sulu Archipelago of the Pacific Ocean, between Mindanao and Borneo. For his courageous conduct during the battle, he received the Cross of the Order of San Fernando. Upon returning to Spain as first midshipman, he was assigned to the Canary Islands Hydrographic Commission. Despite his age and station, he was inducted as an honorary member of the Academy of Fine Arts in Santa Cruz de Tenerife.

In 1853, he sailed as an ensign aboard the corvette Ferrolana in the Mediterranean, visiting France and Italy. In 1857 he was appointed professor at the Naval College, being responsible for the text of Cosmography.

In 1860 he took part in the Hispano-Moroccan War in command of the steamer Ferrolano, and drafted a report on the port, city and fortifications of Mogador. Subsequently, he was awarded the Cross of the Royal Navy Diadem and the rank of Commander of Infantry for his distinguished service. He then returned to the West Indies and took part in the Prim expedition to Mexico as Secretary of the General Commander of Operations of the Fleet. After being stationed in the Naval Station at Havana, he returned to Madrid and held a post in the Ministry of the Navy. On the occasion of the mandate in Cuba of Capitán General Caballero de Rodas he was appointed by the Ministry of Overseas to the post of Secretary of the Government Superior of Cuba, (1869–70).

== Scholar and historian ==
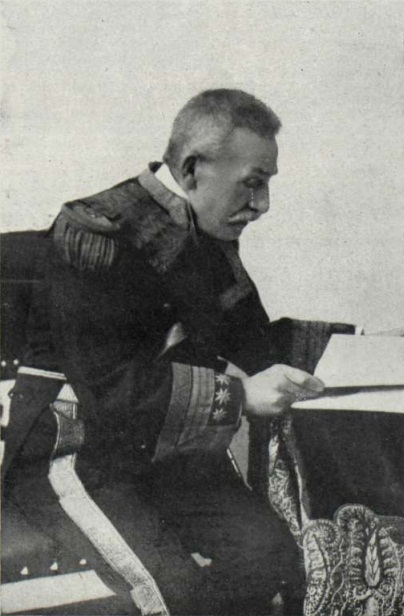
Photograph of EXCMO. SR. D. CESÁREO FERNANDEZ. The first three abbreviations are for Excelentisimo Señor Don, while the two names are short for Cesáreo Fernández Duro. In writing the second surname could be omitted. The photograph is from the periodical, "Vida Marítima," Año VII, nº 232 de 10 de junio de 1908, page 249. The three stripes on the sleeve indicate an Almirante, "Admiral." On retirement military officers universally are given one rank higher than their last active rank. He had long been an excelentisimo, or "honorable" civilian when the photograph was taken.

Still in Madrid, he participated in conferences and organized expeditions to Ifni, on the Atlantic coast of Morocco, to investigate the correct location of the ancient possession of Santa Cruz de la Mar Pequeña. He conducted research on Columbus and his lawsuits, the Santa Maria and the Galleons, as well as writing historical works, including the multi-volume History of the Spanish Navy; also histories of Castile, the City of Zamora, and others. He participated in the archaeological study of the Santa Maria.

Fernández Duro was then made aide-de-camp to King Alfonso XII, and because of his prestige, knowledge and experience, he was appointed arbitrator in determining the boundary between Colombia and Venezuela. In 1881 he entered the Royal Academy of History, and in 1898 he was appointed Perpetual Secretary of the same. Shortly before his death, being already seriously ill, he received the Award of Merit from the Academy.

== Literary works ==
Fernández Duro wrote more than 400 publications including books, monographs, reports and memoirs, particularly on three subjects: the history of the Spanish Navy, the conquest of America and the history of the province of Zamora. On this last topic he wrote a collection of news-biographical literature relating to Zamora or materials for its history (Madrid: Manuel Tello, 1891), which was awarded in 1876. The book is divided into three sections: a regional bibliography of works dealing with Zamora, a bibliography of works on the history of the press in Zamora and a bio-bibliography of famous Zamoran persons. As for his work on the history of the Spanish Navy, his History of the Spanish Armada from the Union of Castile and Aragon (1895–1903) in nine volumes, and his Nautical Disquisitions (1876–1881) in six, remain unsurpassed in their field today.

== Bibliography ==
- Guillen, Julio F. (1975). "El Capitán de Navio D. Cesáreo Fernandez Duro, Secretario Perpetuo de la Real Academia de la Historia" (PDF) (in Spanish). Instituto de Historia y Cultura Naval.
- O'Donnell, Hugo (2018). "Cesáreo Fernández Duro". Diccionario Biográfico electrónico (DB~e) (in Spanish). Real Academia de la Historia.

== Attribution ==
- This article incorporates information from the equivalent article on the Spanish Wikipedia.
