= Battle of the Gulf of Cádiz =

Battle of the Gulf of Cádiz (1604)
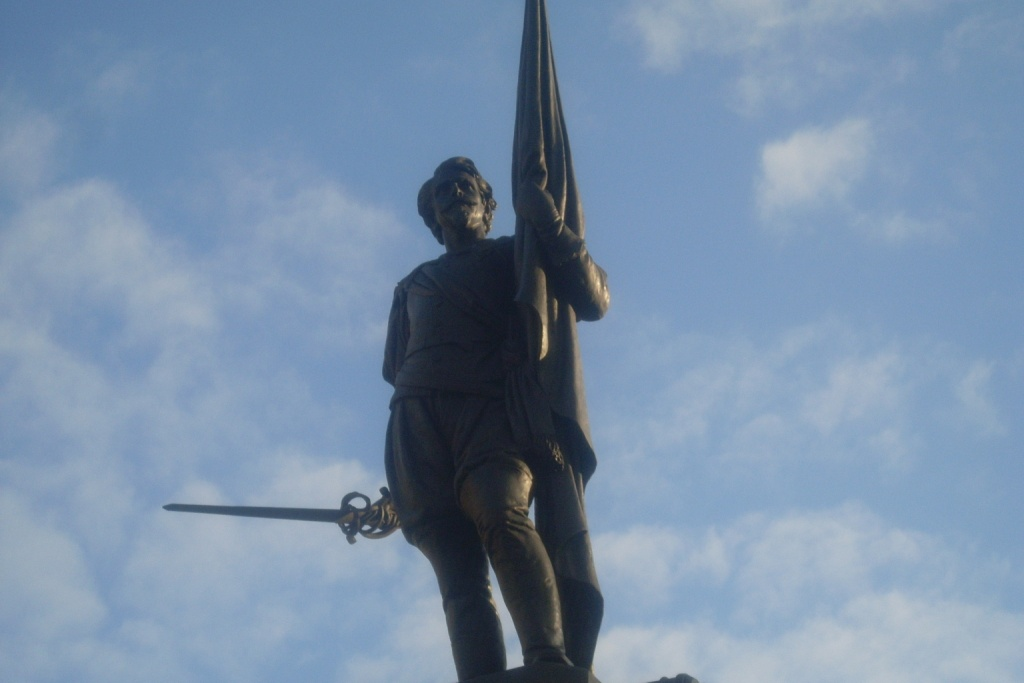
- Monument to Antonio de Oquendo in San Sebastián
Date	7 August 1604
Location	Gulf of Cádiz 37°1′57″N 7°32′11″W
Result	Spanish victory

Belligerents
Spain	English corsairs

Commanders and leaders
Antonio de Oquendo	Unknown

Strength
2 galleons	1 galleon 1 fusta

Casualties and losses
1 galleon damaged	1 galleon captured 1 fusta damaged 100 dead and wounded

The Battle of the Gulf of Cádiz was a naval action which occurred on 7 August 1604. The battle took place when a flotilla of two galleons commanded by Antonio de Oquendo engaged two English corsairs in the service of the Barbary States who were plundering shipping lanes and villages from Galicia to the Gulf of Cádiz. One of the English ships was captured and the other damaged. Oquendo's action off Cádiz was fought days before the signing of the Treaty of London, which ended the protracted war between England and Spain.

== Background ==
English privateering had seized in June 1603 after Elizabeth I had died, one year prior to the conclusion of the war. The new King, James I forbade privateering due to peace negotiations with Spain to end the long and ongoing Anglo-Spanish War. As a result, many former Elizabethan Sea Dogs either joined the Dutch cause or sought employment in the Barbary States attacking European merchant shipping. Negotiations between the Spanish and the English crowns to end the war were still dragging on in London into the following year.

In early 1604, 27-year-old Spanish officer Antonio de Oquendo was appointed commander of a two-galleon flotilla based at Lisbon by his superior, Luis Fajardo, Captain General of the Spanish Ocean Fleet. Antonio was the son of Miguel de Oquendo, a fleet commander who died in October 1588 when his ship foundered off Pasajes, while coming back from the ill-fated campaign of the Spanish Armada. The goal of Oquendo's small unit was to fight the Dutch, English, and Barbary corsairs which threatened the shipping lanes along the western Atlantic coast of Spain and Portugal. The squadron was made of the flagship Delfín de Escocia and the slightly smaller Dobladilla.

In July, sea-traders and inhabitants from villages on the Atlantic coast of Portugal and Andalusia reported a series of looting raids and attacks on shipping carried out by two vessels. The flagship was a 500-ton vessel while the smaller warship was described as a fusta. Oquendo's squadron departed from Lisbon on 15 July in search of the enemy. The orders of Fajardo were to avoid conflict with English ships, given the ongoing peace negotiations in London, unless they showed hostile intentions.

== Engagement ==
The Spanish flotilla searched the waters around Cape St. Vincent, Cape Santa María, and Cádiz for more than 20 days, without results. On 7 August at dawn, however, they found the two ships in the Gulf of Cádiz, between them and the shore, identifying them as English. The ships were ordered to strike sail and comply with inspection, but instead of submitting, the larger corsair vessel suddenly approached and eventually grappled Oquendo's flagship. About 100 men boarded Delfín de Escocia. After two hours of fighting, Oquendo managed to beat back the attackers, with many dead and wounded on both sides. The clash was fought almost entirely with blade weapons.

Spanish reports claim that Oquendo's men threw some of the English boarders overboard. The ship tried to disengage and flee, but Oquendo led his crew to the assault, boarding the enemy ship and forcing the English commander to surrender. The other vessel a fusta, which had been badly battered by Dobladilla's guns, fled at full sail and could not be stopped. The Spanish flagship was heavily damaged in the action, arriving at Cascais along with Dobladilla and their prey for repairs.

== Aftermath ==
While the galleons and the captured ship remained at Cascais, Fajardo's rivals let out the rumor that the squadron had suffered a disaster. All the doubts were swept away when Oquendo arrived in Lisbon, where he was given a triumphal reception. Captain General Luis Fajardo and King Philip III sent letters of congratulation to him, marking the beginning of a notable naval career. Oquendo himself issued a list of prisoners and handed over the English commander to the authorities. He was also awarded the captured corsair as a prize. A second English corsair was captured by Oquendo off Cascais the following September, and the sea lanes between Lisbon and Cádiz were cleared of hostile warships for a long time.

Piracy nevertheless continued well after peace with England was signed, and Spanish naval expeditions were sent to the Barbary coast, some organised by Fajardo which were a success.

The action was one of the last military encounters of the Anglo-Spanish War that began in 1585, just days before the signing of the Treaty of London the 28th August.

== See also ==
- Battle of Pantelleria (1586)
- Jack Ward
- Henry Mainwaring
- Raid on La Goulette (1609)
