= Raid on La Goulette (1609) =

Spanish raid on Ottoman Tunisia

- Part of Spanish–Ottoman wars
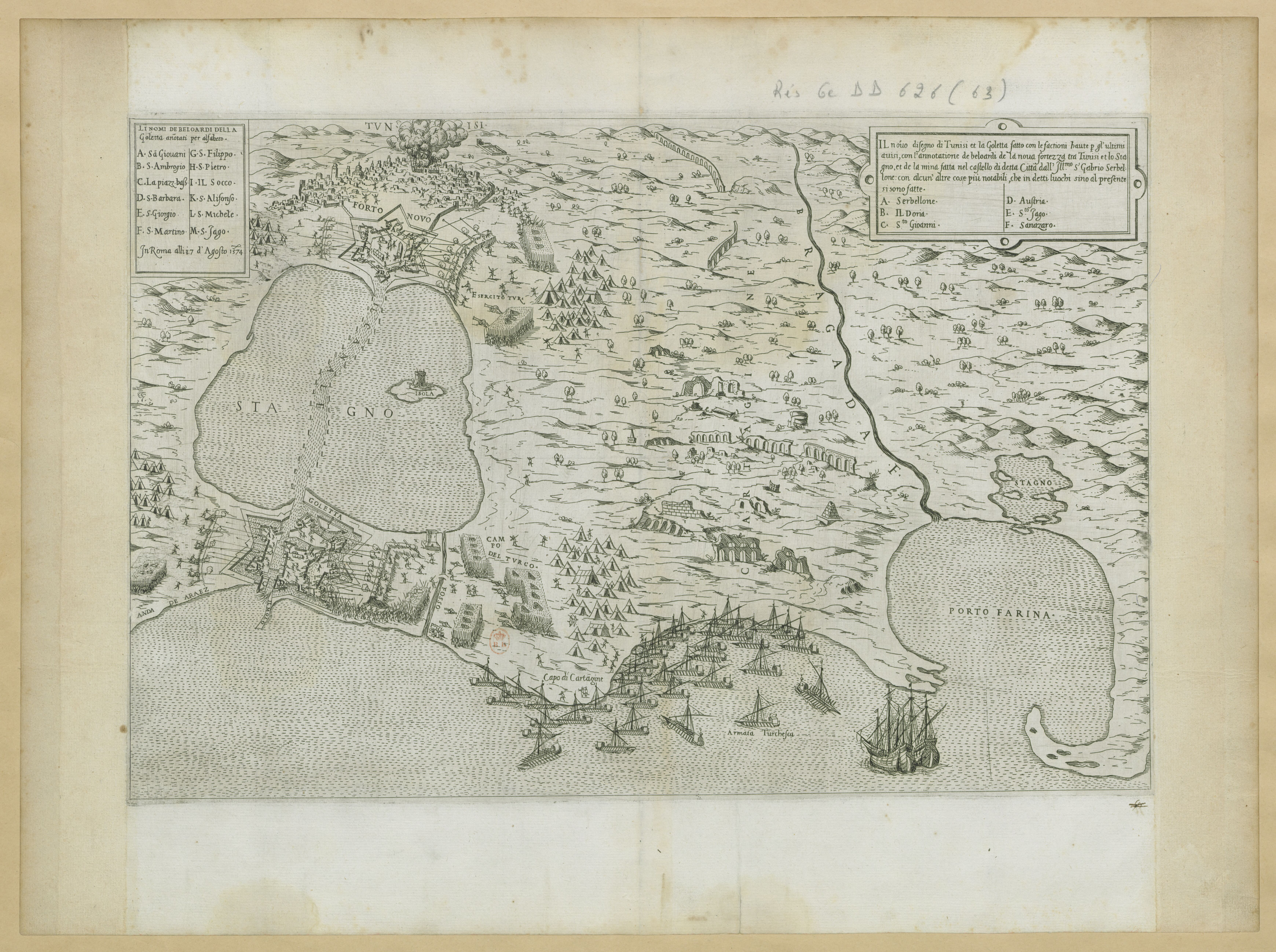
- Tunis and La Goulette in the 17th century.
Date	30 July – August 4 1609
Location	Halq al-Wadi, Ottoman Tunisia
Result	Spanish–French victory

Belligerents
Spanish Empire; Kingdom of France	Eyalet of Tunis

Commanders and leaders
(Spanish Empire) Luis Fajardo (Spanish Empire) Juan Fajardo (Kingdom of France) Philippe de Beaulieu-Persac	Uthman Dey; Jack Ward; Francis Verney; Richard Bishop

Strength
8 galleons 2 carracks 1 caravel 1 frigate Unknown number of pataches	22 armed ships 1 galiot 20,000 land soldiers

Casualties and losses
3 dead 40 wounded	21 vessels destroyed 2 vessels captured Over 780 dead

The raid on La Goulette of 1609 was a naval attack by Spanish captain Luis Fajardo, at the head of a Spanish fleet and a French ship, on La Goulette, the main port of Ottoman Tunisia. The attack was carried on in response to previous acts of Barbary pirates based off Tunis, who now planned to raid the Spanish treasure fleet. It led to the destruction of the local corsair fleet in port, which included English renegades like Jack Ward and Francis Verney.

The raid was hailed in Christendom as the biggest blow to the Ottoman corsairs after the Battle of Lepanto. It was also the first early modern naval operation executed in the Mediterranean exclusively with sailing ships, like galleons and caravels, without the support of rowing galleys. Galley squads were increasingly seen in Spain as an unnecessary expense to maintain in great numbers after Lepanto, leading Fajardo to experiment with sailing ships instead. Its success was an early sign of the obsolescence of the galley.

== Background ==
In January 1609, after several victories against the Dutch in the Atlantic, Fajardo was promoted to the royal council of war. During the Expulsion of the Moriscos some months later, he took upon him to disrupt the movements of the Barbary corsairs in North Africa. The corsairs had been one of the reasons behind the Expulsion, as the crown had reports of Barbary sympathizers and agents hiding among the Morisco population, who often encouraged and assisted them in attacking the coasts of Spain in order to fuel the Barbary slave trade. Deterring them during the Expulsion was therefore a priority. The council already found out that Zymen Danseker, a Barbary corsair of Dutch origin, hounded around Cape St. Vincent with at least 18 vessels and had already taken several merchants of several nationalities.

The Duke of Lerma, King Philip III's minister, ordered to hunt him down, leading Fajardo to step up. Aware that Danseker commanded powerful western sailing ships in his fleet, Fajardo proposed to gather another mixed fleet of sailing ships and galleys to counter him. He also sought to rehabilitate the reputation of the Spanish galleon fleets after the defeat of Gibraltar in 1607, as well as test their effectivity in the Mediterranean, where maintaining large squad galleys had ceased being practical for Spain after the end of Ottoman-Venetian War in 1573. His proposal was helped by the Twelve Years' Truce, which allowed the Spanish to relocate resources from the Atlantic to the Mediterranean.

In parallel to these preparations, French captain Philippe de Beaulieu-Persac carried out his own fight against the Barbary corsairs sailed off Marseille in May with three vessels. After sighting Danseker with seven ships in Portuguese waters, Beaulieu planned to hunt him down with the help of seven nearby Spanish galleys thanks to the Peace of Vervins, but a storm separated them. After a brief return to Marseille and an encounter with Barbary corsairs from Tunisia, among them Jack Ward, Beaulieu decided to attack their own ports. As the traditional Franco-Ottoman alliance disavowed waging open war on them, Beaulieu asked the Knights Hospitaller in Malta to fight under their flag, and upon being refused, he resorted to continue his journey under no flag whatsoever.

Fajardo was authorized to draw from the fleets of Andalusia and Portugal, gathering 12 ships with crews recruited mostly in northern Spain. However, the council ultimately decided to include no galleys in his fleet, ultimately trusting the sailing ships' firepower to be decisive in any battle against their Barbary counterparts. This would make it a highly unusual operation; although the Spanish were experienced at fielding sailing ships in the Mediterranean, such as in the conquest of Tunis of 1535, no major operation had ever been achieved without the support of galleys. Fajardo ultimately sailed off Cádiz in June, with his son Juan Fajardo de Tenza as his lieutenant, while leaving Antonio de Oquendo to watch the southern Spanish coast.

== Previous movements ==
Upon leaving Cádiz, Fajardo ordered the flee to divide in three sections: one captained by his son Juan to patrol the coast of Africa, a second one to gather reinforcements in Málaga and Almería, and the last captained by himself between both in order to assist wherever it was necessary. Once reunited again, the fleet arrived in Oran, stopping at Mers El Kébir on day 28. Warned by the local governor, Felipe Ramírez de Arellano, Count of Aguilar, that a suspicious vessel had been sighted in the mouth of river Tafna in Tlemcen, Fajardo sent Juan with seven local pataches and 200 men stationed in Oran. Juan found and captured the ship near the island of Limacos, finding out it belonged to Danseker's fleet and was carrying a cargo of weapons, with a crew of English and Jews.

Resuming the journey, the Spanish sighted Algiers. After nightfall, Fajardo sent in a party of Spanish marine infantry in four pataches and several chalupas to explore the port. They found eight sailing ships and four galleys taking refuge in Algiers, among them Danseker's flagship, and judged the port well defended. Fajardo realized that foreseeable winds would allow his ships to enter, but not to leave; without galleys to tow them away, he risked being trapped in a dangerous enemy harbor. To boot, they found out that despite his ship, Danseker was not in Algiers, making the effort pointless. He therefore opted to continue towards Tunis, his second target.

On day 21 they captured two ships, one of which belonged again to Danseker, and the following day they found Beaulieu-Persac's flotilla, severely damaged by a recent defeat against the Barbary ships. Beaulieu warned them about the presence of at least 23 enemy ships being supplied in Tunis to raid. He also revealed to them that Danseker, having learned of the preparations being made against him in Spain, had deserted from Algiers and gone to France to enter the service of King Henry IV, who was also seeking to strengthen his navy against the Spanish. However, Beaulieu requested to join the plan to attack Tunis in order to destroy the corsair ships, who he revealed to have gathered on the orders of the dey of Tunis, Uthman, to attack the Spanish treasure fleet.

Again due to the Peace of Vervins, which forced Fajardo to behave diplomatically, Beaulieu was allowed to join the fleet, which had ensured a truce between Spain and France, Beaulieu joined Fajardo's ship with his only ship in condition to fight, a galleon. Fajardo was planning to deviate to Sicily and enlist the flotilla of Anthony Shirley, composed by another 23 ships, but ultimately decided to attack Tunis already along with the French. On day 30, they arrived in Tunisia, where Fajardo found out the defenses of La Goulette had been reinforced. The Ottoman garrison had recently repulsed an attack by the Order of St. John and was expecting another by the swuads of galleys of Naples and Sicily, so they had increased the artillery and brought in 400 Turkish arquebusiers. Fajardo then planned an amphibious attack.

== Opposing forces ==
The Spanish fleet included the galleons San Francisco, Santa María Magdalena, San Agustín, Nuestra Señora de los Remedios, San Fulgencio, San Luis and Rosario, along with the carracks Santa Margarita and Nuestra Señora de Regla, the frigate Santa Ana, the caravel Nuestra Señora del Buen Viaje and the minor ship San Juan Bautista. Beulieu commanded the galleon Lune, formerly a Dutch ship named Maan, along with two minor vessels.

Some of the Tunisian ships names were given as Madaleyne 24, Perle (French), Comte Maurice 50, Faulcon (Portuguese), as well as 1 700-ton ship and 1 500-ton ship of 31 guns. The 16 real fighting ships and the galley had 435 guns total.

== Battle ==
Fajardo arranged the raid in three sections. He first sent in small boats, employing seven pataches and two chalupas, with father and son leading the marine infantry. Next they were followed by three medium-sized galleons, small enough to approach as a close as possible without running aground, to cover them with artillery fire. Behind them there remained the rest of the fleet, which would bombard the fortress of La Goulette from afar. Once launched, the marines proceeded to assault the port under intense enemy fire, being covered by the ships, which started exchanging fire with the local artillery.

The Spanish used incendiary devices to set fire to 21 ships and one galiot, capturing two more. The ships turned out to belong to Danseker and pirates and privateers of multiple nationalities, indeed including Uthman Dey and the English renegades Jack Ward, Francis Verney and Richard Bishop. The Englishmen were apparently present but managed to escape among the confusion. They inflicted around 280 casualties and 200 wounded among the locals due to the surprise. In turn, the fortress mostly failed to hit the pataches and chalupas due to their small size and the fleet's own gunfire, while the larger galleons and ships were able to absorb the damage. The marines only failed to set fire to a patache, which was later held as a miracle when the ship was found to be a Catalonian vessel carrying Mercedarian friars to pay ransoms of Christian captives.

Being informed that the garrison of La Goulette failed to interrupt the raid, Uthman Dey mobilized 20,000 soldiers of infantry and cavalry in Tunis and rushed to the port. However, Fajardo ordered the shops to bombard the Tunisian reinforcements when they arrived, stopping their advance and routing them with over 500 dead. By this point, Fajardo was effectively left in control of the field, finishing the battle with only 20 Spanish killed in the raid. After the action, he found out eleven of the burnt ships had carried orders to sack the Spanish coasts, while nine others had been meant to head for the Ottoman Levant. Uthman sent then a parley, claiming that the ships were only there to defend Tunisia from French pirates, and offered to supply the Spanish. Fajardo declined, but decided to stay due to unfavorable weather.

Next morning, a new African ship arrived to La Goulette ignoring the recent events. Warned about the Christians by the fortress' artillery, its crew ran it aground and attempted to escape by land. Fajardo captured several of them and took the ship, in which the found a cargo of weapons and 40 French prisoners. Another pirate ship was abandoned and scuttled in the channel when its crew realized the situation, with the Spanish seizing it and finding it loaded of booty. Eventually, with the arrival of better winds, and not wanting to risk himself to a turnaround of the situation, Fajardo sent an embassy to aquiesce with Tunis the ransom of the prisoners, for which he obtained 2,000 gold sequins. On August 4, the Spanish fleet finally left Tunisia.

== Aftermath ==
Parting ways with Beaulieu, Fajardo arrived in Cádiz very low of supplies, but loaded with booty. After the raid, he was then was ordered to take his fleet to Cartagena to assist the transport of Moriscos to Africa. Although Fajardo had been forced to abandon their original goal of raiding Algiers, the operation nonetheless satisfied greatly the Spanish council, as it had translated into a shocking victory and proved the potential of unsupported sailing ships in the Mediterranean. It was also echoed in Europe as the biggest victory over Barbary corsairs since Lepanto, where Tunisian and Algerian squads had participated. Fajardo's success was not to be the last of the Spanish navy in North Africa, greatly increasing its reputation, although it failed to extinguish the endemic corsairs.

For his part, Beaulieu continued his journey. After hearing about the Battle of Paphos, where three St. John galleons had been captured by a huge Ottoman fleet, he joined a Tuscan fleet captained by knight Guillaume Gadagne de Beauregard, taking port in Alexandretta to explore the possibility of an Ottoman rebellion headed by Şehzade Yahya. In early 1610, Beaulieu returned to Malta, where he tried and failed to gain support for his own raid in La Goulette, and returned to France afterwards. Beauregard stayed in Ottoman waters with a flotilla of galleons, fighting several indecisive battles with the local fleets.

Ward and Bishop took refuge in La Mámora and relocated their base there, although shortly after the Spanish reached them and burned their ships again, forcing them out to the Atlantic temporarily (La Mámora would be also conquered by Fajardo in 1614). The captains of Spanish galleys in Naples and Sicily, the Castilian Álvaro de Bazán y Benavides and the Italian Ottavio d'Aragona respectively, continued hunting down corsairs after Fajardo's departure. Another Spanish raid in La Goulette would destroy Danseker's fleet in 1612.

== See also ==
- Siege of Coron (1533–1534) – Naval battle where artillery from sailing ships was decisive against Ottoman galleys
- Skirmish at Cerigo Channel – Naval battle where artillery from sailing ships deterred a much larger Ottoman galley fleet
- Raid on La Goulette (1612) – New Spanish raid in La Goulette to destroy the corsair fleet
- Battle of Cape Gelidonya – Naval battle where Spanish sailing ships defeated a much larger Ottoman galley fleet

== Bibliography ==
- Anderson, Roger Charles (1952). Naval wars in the Levant, 1559-1853. Princeton University Press.
- Barrientos Grandon, Javier (2024). Los Consejeros del Rey (1500-1836). Volumen V. Díaz de la Cabeza-Fernández de Heredia. Derecho Histórico BOE.
- Corbett, Julian (2007). England in the Mediterranean: A Study of the Rise and Influence of British Power Within the Straits, 1603-1713. Cosimo. ISBN 9781602062672.
- Fernández Duro, Cesáreo (1895). La Armada Española desde la unión de los reinos de Castilla y Aragón. Sucesores de Rivadeneyra.
- Fernández Duro, Cesáreo (1885). El gran duque de Osuna y su marina: jornadas contra turcos y venecianos (1602–1624). Spain: Sucesores de Rivadeneyra. ISBN 978-84-8472-126-0.
- de la Guardia, Ricardo (1914). Notas para un Cronicón de la Marina Militar de España. Anales de trece siglos de historia de la marina. El Correo Gallego.
- Hume, Martin; Ward, Adolphus (2018). The Wars of Religion in Europe. Perennial Press. ISBN 9781531263188.
- Janer, Florencio (1857). Condicion social de los Moriscos de España: causas de su expulsion y consecuencias que esta produjo en el orden economico y politico. Real Academia de la Historia.
- Martínez Ruiz, Enrique (2020). La defensa del Imperio. 1500-1700. Paraninfo. ISBN 9788428342728.
- Penrose, Boies (1938). The Sherleian Odyssey: Being of the Travels and Adventures of Three Famous Brothers During the Reigns of Elizabeth, James I, and Charles I. University of Wisconsin.
