= Francis Verney =

English adventurer and pirate (1584–1615)

Sir Francis Verney
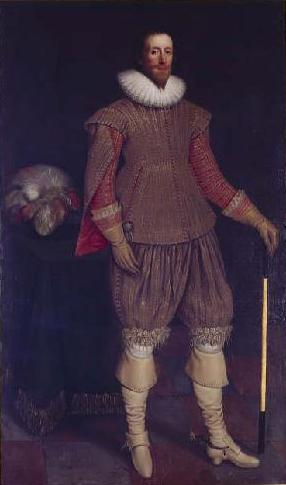
- An oil portrait of Sir Francis Verney prior to his leaving England in 1607–08. It has been on display at Claydon House for over 400 years.
- Born: 1584; Tring, Hertfordshire, England
- Died: 6 October 1615 (aged 31); Messina, Sicily
- Piratical career
- Other names: Sir Francis Verney of Claydon; Sir Francis Verney of Penley
- Type: Barbary corsair
- Years active: 1608–1610?
- Base of operations: Algiers

Sir Francis Verney (1584 – 6 September 1615) was an English adventurer, soldier of fortune, and pirate. A nobleman by birth, he left England after the House of Commons sided with his stepmother in a legal dispute over his inheritance, and became a mercenary in Morocco and later a Barbary corsair.

Verney was among the most successful captains to operate on the Barbary coast during the early 17th century and, despite having no seafaring experience, was one of four leaders of the Tunisian pirate fleet commanded by John Ward. His supposed conversion to Islam with Ward in 1610 was the cause of considerable controversy in his native country. Verney was later captured and spent two years in the Sicily slave galleys. He was rescued by an English Jesuit in 1614 and converted to Catholicism shortly before his death.

== Early life ==
The only son of Audrey Gardner (died 1588) and Sir Edmund Verney (died 1600), Francis Verney was born in 1584 at Pendley Manor in Tring, Hertfordshire, England. His father who came from a gentry family with city and court connections, through his first and third marriages into two other gentry families, made Francis one of several stepchildren within the Redmayne, Turville, and St. Barbe families; he was related to a total of seven gentry families through marriage. Within his immediate family, he had a younger half-brother, Edmund (1590–1642), who was born on 1 January 1590, the only child produced by Edmund and Lady Mary Blakeney.

Varney's Estate Act 1597
- Act of Parliament
- Parliament of England
- Long title: An Acte for the Confyrmacion of the Joynture of the Ladie Varnmey Wiefe of Sir Edmunde Varney Knight.
- Citation: 39 Eliz. 1. c. 10 Pr.
- Territorial extent: England and Wales

Dates
- Royal assent: 9 February 1598
- Commencement: 24 October 1597 (Note: Start of session.)

Status: Current legislation

In 1599, Francis was married to his stepsister, Ursula St. Barbe, daughter of William St. Barbe of Broadlands and Mary Blakeney. The marriage was presumably arranged by Edmund and Lady Mary, described as a "masterful" woman, to cement their families fortunes and, more specifically, to protect the interests of Lady Mary and her daughter. She also persuaded her husband to divide the property granted to Francis by his uncle's will with their son Edmund. This resulted in the original will being superseded and this new settlement confirmed by a private act of Parliament passed in the House of Lords on 3rd February, 1597/8 (39 Eliz. 1. c. 10 Pr.). These moves greatly increased the influence and power of Lady Mary. Edmund Verney died on 11 January 1600, when Francis was only 15 years old, and was subsequently sent off to Trinity College, Oxford in September of that year. Though little of his childhood is recorded, according to the Dictionary of National Biography, he had "all the advantages that a fine face and figure, great personal courage, and a magnificent taste in dress could bestow". It was during this period that he began running huge debts spending as much as £3,000 a year. Leaving Oxford, Verney soon rebelled against his arranged marriage living separately from his wife in Alsatia, a notorious neighbourhood within Whitefriars, a sanctuary where debtors and other criminals fled to escape punishment, where one of his servants, Richard Gygges, was murdered in a drunken brawl in 1604. He would legally separate from Ursula upon reaching adulthood and provided her £50 a year for the rest of her life. Verney was knighted at the Tower of London on 14 March 1603/4.

== Break with the Verney family ==
As soon as he came of age, Verney challenged his stepmother in court over the terms of his inheritance. He may have been motivated by his friends who, when finding himself in serious debt, had guaranteed his debtors and were pressuring him to repay them. He appealed to the House of Commons to reverse the family arrangement which an Elizabethan Act sanctioned years earlier. A case was made that their decision had unjustly deprived him of his rights while still a minor. It was also made under unusual circumstances as, given the norms of the times, the consolidation of family estates were under the ownership of a sole inheritor.

The case went through "much debate and argument" as famous counsel were employed on each side, Mr. Wincall and Crewe respectively. Crewe's pleading to the House on behalf of the Sir Edmund's widow as well as testimony of several surviving committee members of the 1597 Bill damaged Francis' case. The courts eventually favored Lady Mary and upheld the terms of the inheritance.

== Adventures in Morocco ==
Verney sold his estates following his loss, effectively deserting his wife, and went abroad. He was very bitter after losing his case, in addition to the overwhelming debt he faced, causing him to "forsake the friends who had injured him, and the country which has refused him redress". He wandered the continent for some time, visiting Jerusalem during his travels, and became an accomplished adventurer and world traveler. On his return trip to England, Verney briefly attended religious services with George Carew at the English embassy in Paris. He had "fought several duellos" but, since departing his home country, had lost what remained of his fortune. Verney spent the summer and fall of 1608 to tie up loose ends, giving "general irrevocable authority" to his uncle Urian Verney and handed his remaining title deeds to another uncle, and left England for a final time.

Family tradition claims he went to Morocco where he joined Captain John and Philip Giffard, both relatives of the Verneys, who commanded an army of two hundred fellow Englishmen, mostly gentlemen volunteers, in the service of Muley Sidan, a claimant to the Moroccan throne. Sidan's father, Muley Hamet, had enjoyed a privileged relationship with Queen Elizabeth I and Giffard's soldiers-of-fortune fought on Sidan's behalf against his other rivals, namely Ahmed ibn Abi Mahalli and Sidi al-Ayachi, and his brother Abou Fares Abdallah, during the country's wars of succession.

== Life as a Barbary corsair ==
After the Giffards were killed in a desert skirmish in 1607, many of their men took to piracy. Verney, as told by the Verney family, found refuge with another relative, Richard Giffard, who was captain of the Fortune, commanding what was essentially a pirate fleet, and Verney is mentioned among his officers. This part of the story was disputed by British historian Adrian Tinniswood who claimed that Giffard was imprisoned in Florentine captivity from 1607 to 1610. Regardless of who served as his pirating mentor, within two years he had become one of the most feared pirates on the Barbary Coast "making havoc of his own countrymen, and carrying into Algiers prizes belonging to the merchants of Poole and Plymouth" by Francis Cottington of the English embassy in Madrid. One of his better known exploits was the capture of merchant vessel bound from Marseille which was carrying a shipment of French wine for the court of James I. King James grew so concerned over Verney's activities that he assigned a ship-of-war to escort merchant vessels en route for Aleppo in the Levant area.

During this period, Verney was one of the four leaders in the Tunisian fleet headed by John Ward, Richard Bishop, and Kara Osman, the latter captain of the Janissaries at Tunis. Simon Danziger and Jan Jansz were also included in the fleet's ranks of Englishmen, Dutchmen, Spaniards, and Turks. Verney served as Ward's second-in-command. In December 1610, according to claims made by the Venetian ambassador in Tunis, he and Ward were accused of "turning Turk" by becoming converts to Islam causing a sensation in royal society when news reached back to England. This was a charge often made against corsairs of European origin as many, Verney included, often adopted the clothing worn by locals after settling in Algiers or Tunis.

He was eventually captured by a Sicilian corsair and spent two years in captivity as a galley slave until being ransomed to an English Jesuit. Sir Robert Chamberlain, while in Naples, took a sympathetic interest in his countryman, and traveled to Malta to reclaim him in 1614. Verney was granted his freedom on the condition that he convert to Catholicism which he did.

== Final years in Sicily ==
Though now a free man, Verney was left alone and penniless. He spent the remainder of his life in Sicily where he was forced to enlist as a common soldier in the service of the Duke of Sona, the Spanish viceroy of Palermo. He was found by Scottish traveler-writer William Lithgow in "extremest calamity and sickness" at La Pieta (St. Mary of Pity), a pauper's hospital, in Messina where Lithgow recorded Verney's last days before his death on 6 September 1615, and performed the last offices. Lithgow's account, entitled "The most delectable and true discors of an admirid and painful peregrination by William Lithgow", was published seven years later. English merchant John Watchin later obtained a formal certificate of his death, signed by Don Peter Garcia, which he forwarded with Verney's personal effects to Claydon House.

== Legacy ==
Though common among the Barbary corsairs, as Muslim rulers sanctioned attacks on Christian merchants "as part of a larger jihad against the infidel", Francis Verney's conversion to Islam caused considerable controversy in his native England. His own family considered his becoming a Catholic later in life only "barely preferable" to Islam. When his wife Ursula remarried in 1619, she was still described in contemporary gossip as "widow to him that turned Turk". His life as a corsair was first recorded by John Bruce in 1853, and later by Lady Frances Parthenope Verney when she began the four-volume Memoirs of the Verney Family in 1892, though both disputed some of William Lithgow's claims. It was later noted by Adrian Tinniswood that in Victorian society "a pirate in the family was wrong but romantic; an apostate was beyond the pale".

Of the personal effects sent to the Verney family by John Watchin, which included a turban, slippers, silk tunics, and pilgrim's staff, Lady Frances made mention that all were still preserved at Claydon House. A full-length oil portrait of Verney, in the style of the Spanish school, is also displayed at the estate. Interest in Verney carried over into the 20th century as part of the era's popular culture. He was referenced in Dashiell Hammett's 1930 detective novel The Maltese Falcon as one of the people who possessed the jeweled bird. The title character of the 1940 swashbuckler film The Sea Hawk, played by Errol Flynn, was inspired by the lives of both Verney and Sir Henry Mainwaring. He and Mainwaring were also among the real-life pirates chosen by Disney Imagineer Marc Davis to be portrayed in Disneyland's "Pirates of the Caribbean" amusement ride along with Anne Bonny & Mary Read, Charles Gibbs, and Ned Low.
