= Anglo-Turkish piracy =

17th-century pirate collaboration against Catholic shipping

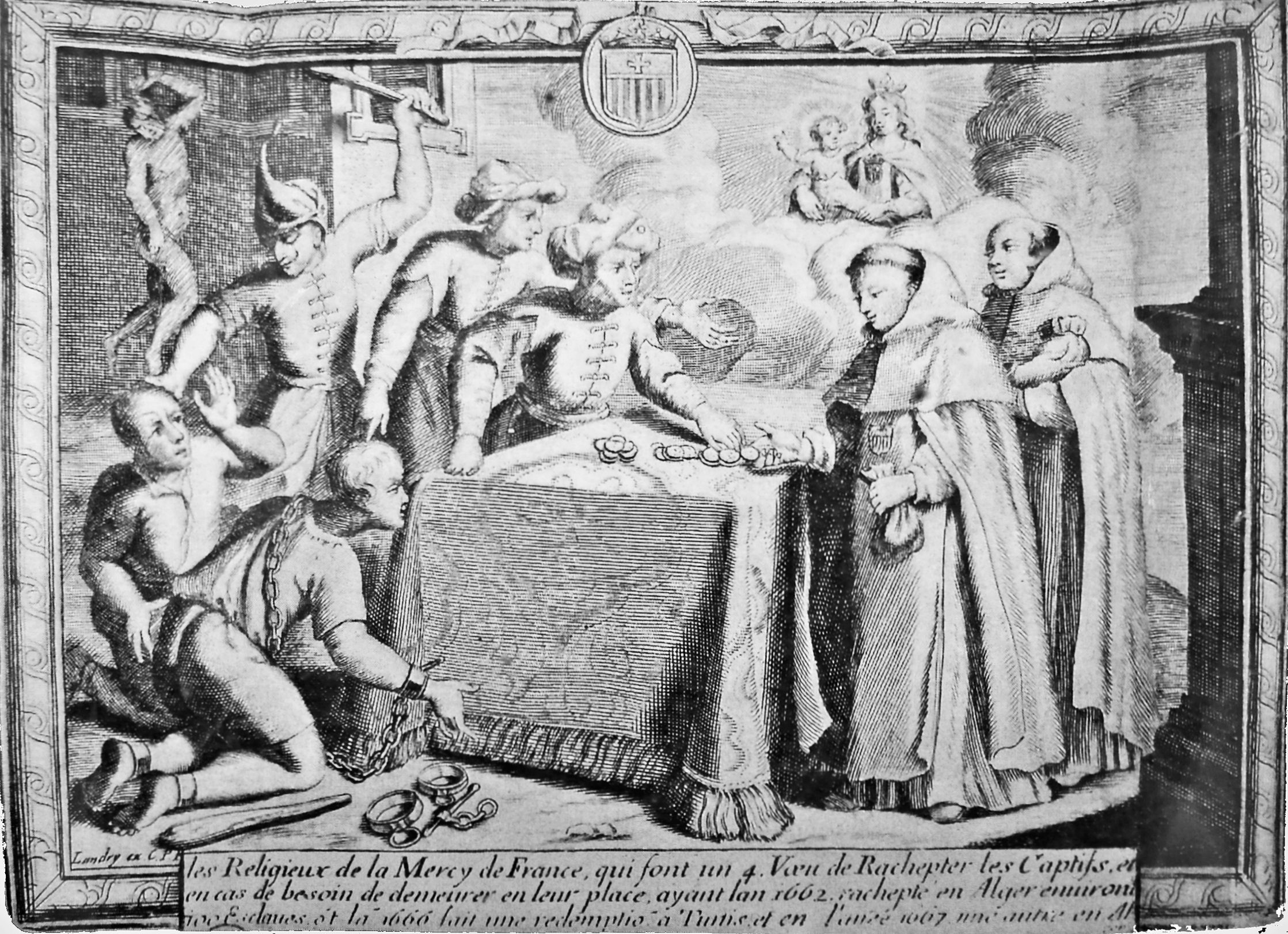
Purchase of Christian captives by Catholic monks in the Barbary states.

Anglo-Turkish piracy or the Anglo-Barbary piracy was the collaboration between Barbary pirates and English pirates against Catholic shipping during the 17th century.

== Anglo-Turkish collaboration ==
The Protestants and the Muslim Turks, more precisely the Barbary pirates, collaborated during that period against their common enemy, Catholic Europe. This collaboration has to be seen in the context of the wars of religions and the ongoing mortal battle between Protestantism and Catholicism. At that time, Spain, Portugal, and France, which were implementing anti-Protestant policies, were the target of this Anglo-Muslim collaboration. Elizabethan Sea Dogs had been active against Spain until 1603 when the new King James I ordered the termination of privateering while negotiations with Spain began. The now former English privateers were still inclined to continue the fight against the Spanish, although under the protection of a different state, to the embarrassment of the English Crown.

Piracy in the ranks of the Muslim pirates of Barbary was also a way to find employment, after King James I formally proclaimed an end to privateering in June 1603. Further, abandoning England as well as their faith was often a way to financial success, as fortunes could be made by attacking Catholic shipping.

In August 1604, English Corsairs attempted to pillage the Spanish and Portuguese coasts with two ships, including a fusta. During an action off Cádiz however, two Spanish galleons commanded by Antonio de Oquendo took one ship and forced the other to flee.

By 1610, the wealth of English renegade pirates had become so famous as to become the object of plays, and the king offered royal pardon to those who wished to return.

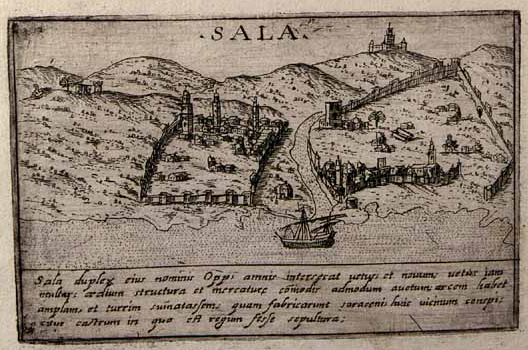
Salé was one of the bases for Anglo-Turkish piracy.

Not only the English corsairs participated to this collaboration, but also the Dutch, who shared the same objectives. Catholic ships were attacked and the crew and passengers taken to Algiers, modern day Algeria, or other places of the Barbary Coast to be sold as slaves. The number of these English pirates was significant. Jack Ward, Henry Mainwaring, Robert Walsingham and Peter Easton were among such English pirates in the service of the deys of the Barbary Coast. Some of the most famous Dutch pirates were Zymen Danseker, Salomo de Veenboer and Jan Janszoon. Some of them, such as Ward and Danseker, were renegades who had adopted Islam. Mainwaring attacked the Spanish preferentially, and claimed that he avoided English shipping, but generally ships of all nationalities seem to have been attacked. Walsingham is known to have freed Turkish captives from Christian galleys, and to have sold Christian captives on the North African slave market. Janszoon led long-ranging raids such as the Turkish Abductions in Iceland to sell his slaves on the Barbary Coast.

A contemporary letter from an English writer complained:

"The infinity of goods, merchandise jewels and treasure taken by our English pirates daily from Christians and carried to Allarach, Algire and Tunis to the great enriching of Mores and Turks and impoverishing of Christians"

— Contemporary letter sent from Portugal to England.

Beyond the shared religious antagonism towards Catholicism, the Barbary States probably offered economic advantages as well as social mobility to Protestant pirates, as the Barbary States were a very cosmopolitan environment at that time.

== Catholic reactions ==
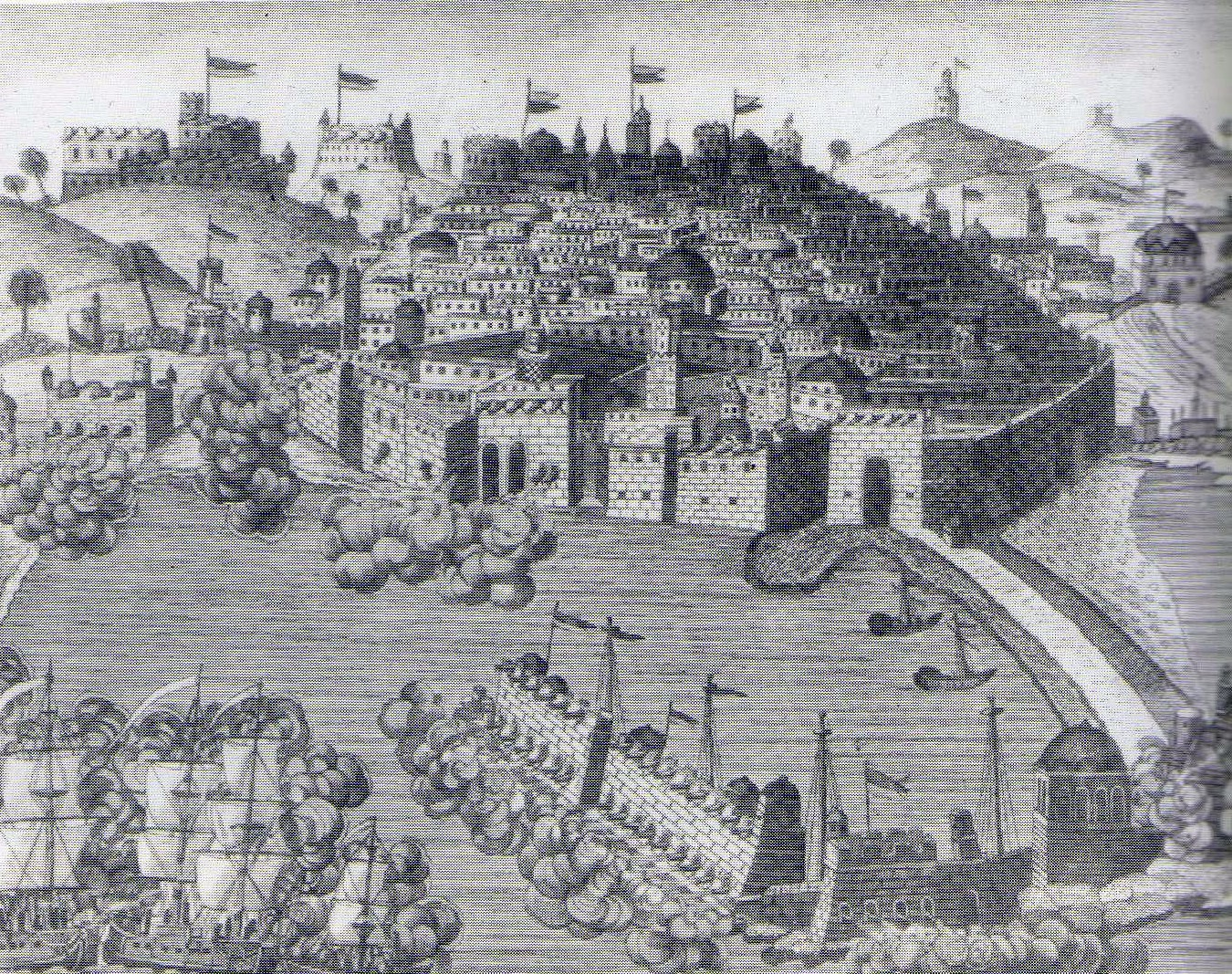
Bombardment of Algiers in 1682, by Abraham Duquesne.

France, which had a tradition of alliance with the Ottoman Empire, placed a formal protest with the Ottoman Sultan Ahmed I in 1607, complaining that English and Dutch pirates were allowed to use North African harbors as bases to raid French shipping. For France, it was a clear conspiracy against Catholicism, described at the time as "Turco-Calvinism".

In order to curb these actions, Spain made a proclamation against piracy and privateering in 1615.

England probably became ambivalent about this sort of piratical collaboration as it attacked Algiers in 1621 in order to free Christian captives there. In 1629, Louis XIII attacked Salé to free 420 French captives. Louis XIV also later bombarded Algiers in retaliation. Catholic religious orders, especially the Trinitarians and the Lazarists under Saint Vincent de Paul, himself a former slave, accumulated donations to ransom and liberate Christian slaves. It is estimated that the missionaries liberated 1,200 slaves until the death of Saint Vincent de Paul in 1660, for a total of 1,200,000 livres.

== See also ==
- Islam and Protestantism
- Barbary Slave Trade
- Luis Fajardo
- Sea Beggars
- Turco-Calvinism
