= Robert Walsingham (pirate) =

Robert Walsingham, also Wallsingham, was a famous 17th-century English pirate who served with the Barbary States. He was the captain of a Turkish man-of-war, in which he finally sailed to Ireland to submit himself to the authorities. He was pardoned in 1621 by James I of England, together with Henry Mainwaring with whom he had collaborated, and was accepted into the Royal Navy.

== See also ==
- Anglo-Turkish piracy
