= Norfolk Symphony =

Norfolk Symphony may refer to:

- Norfolk Rhapsody No. 1 and two unfinished works by Ralph Vaughan Williams
- The Norfolk Symphony, merged in 1979 to form Virginia Symphony Orchestra
