= Capture of La Mámora =

- Part of the Spanish-Moroccan conflicts
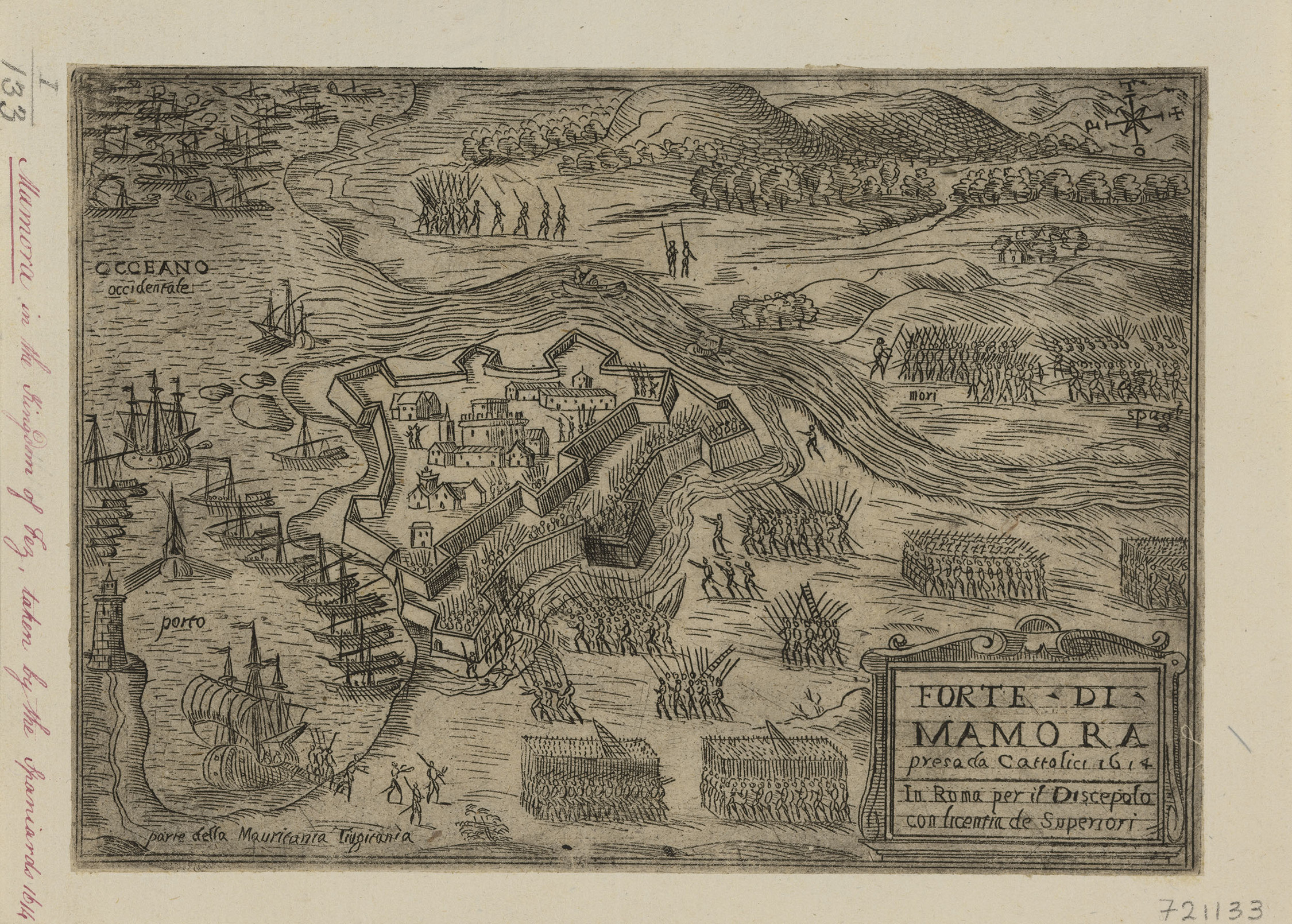
- Spanish troops, marching with ladders to scale the walls of the town, all of which is being achieved without any sign of fighting. The great river, known today as the ‘Oued Sebou’ flows out to the Western Ocean (Occeano occidentale, now the Mediterranean) is shown to the north of the town walls. Engraving by Italian Girolamo Discepolo (c. 1550–1615)
Date	1–2 August 1614
Location	La Mamora, Morocco
Result	Spanish victory
Territorial changes	Capture of La Mamora

Belligerents
Kingdom of Spain	Saadi Sultanate

Commanders and leaders
(Spain) Luis Fajardo	(Saadi Sultanate) Unknown

Strength
Landing Corps of 5,000 men 100 ships, including warships and transports	14 privateer ships

Casualties and losses
Minimal	10 privateer ships captured 4 destroyed

The Capture of La Mámora was a successful Spanish raid, commanded by Admiral Luis Fajardo y Chacón, on the town of La Mamora, south of El Araich in August 1614 as part of a campaign against African privateering at the Moroccan coast. The fortress remained part of the Spanish Kingdom until 1681 when Muley Ismail Ibn Sharif, the Sultan of Morocco took the city from the Spaniards.

== Background ==
By the year 1604, after the first Anglo-Spanish War, pirates had established a pirate haven at La Mamora. It became the main retreat of Atlantic pirates under the command of Henry Mainwaring. Philip III of Spain had started a campaign against privateering that led to the raid on La Goulette of 1609 and the Cession of Larache in 1610.

By the summer of 1614, both the Dutch and the Spanish had ambitions to seize the town. The Dutch Admiral, Jan Evertsen had arrived in Morocco in June 1614 with a fleet of Dutch warships with the brief of entering La Mamora, defeating the pirates and building a fort which would be a Dutch stronghold. While negotiations were taking place between the Dutch and Muley Zaydan, the Spaniards raided the town in August, despite the validity of the Twelve Years' Truce, taking it with hardly any conflict.

== Operation ==
In August 1614, an expeditionary force of 20 warships was sent across the Straits under the command of Luis Fajardo. With most of the corsairs absent, only a few remained to defend the city, they sank two ships at the harbor to prevent the Spanish invaders from swooping in. Spanish guns started decimating the spars and yards that blocked the entrance, and the corsairs found themselves forced to torch their ships and flee. Once they were gone, the Spaniards seized control of the pirate haven.

== Aftermath ==
Renamed San Miguel de Ultramar, it would remain under Spanish rule for 67 years, until 1681, when the Alawite Sultan Ismaíl of Morocco recaptured it.

== Literature ==
- Fernández Duro, Cesáreo (1895). Armada Española desde la unión de los reinos de Castilla y Aragón, vol. III, Madrid, pp. 331–3.
- Henry de Castries (1907). Les sources inédites de l'histoire du Maroc, vol. II, Paris.
- Senior, Clive M. (1976). A Nation of Pirates. Newton Abbot: David & Charles. ISBN 0-7153-7264-5.
