= San Sebastián, Villapalacios =

Church in Villapalacios, Spain

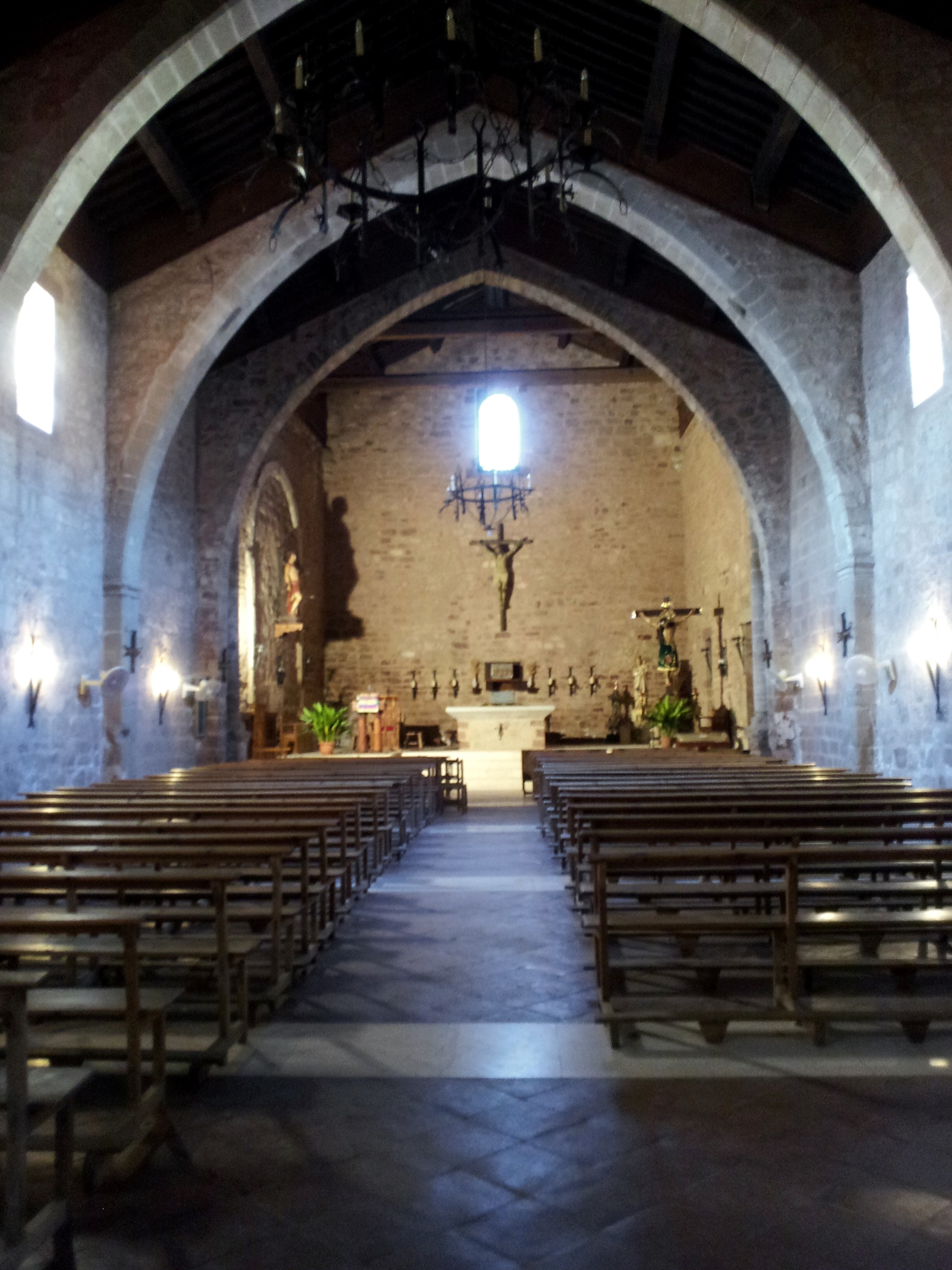

San Sebastián is a Gothic-style, Roman Catholic parish church in the small town of Villapalacios in the province of Albacete, in Castile-La Mancha, Spain.

== History ==
A church at the site was erected in the late 15th century and sited in the main plaza, adjacent to the City Hall. The building consists of a single nave some 40 meters long and 10 meters wide, with external buttresses. The bell tower suffered damage during an earthquake in 1755. The Chapel of the Incarnation was once located on the north side, but collapsed in that earthquake. The ceiling is made of wood. The choir is also an elevated balcony made of wood and highly painted in a Mudejar style with arabesques and designs. Some of the wooden supports have carved grotesque faces.

The building was declared a Monumento Histórico Artístico in the BOE número 72, in March, 1978.
