= Turco-Calvinism =

16th century alliance/rapprochement

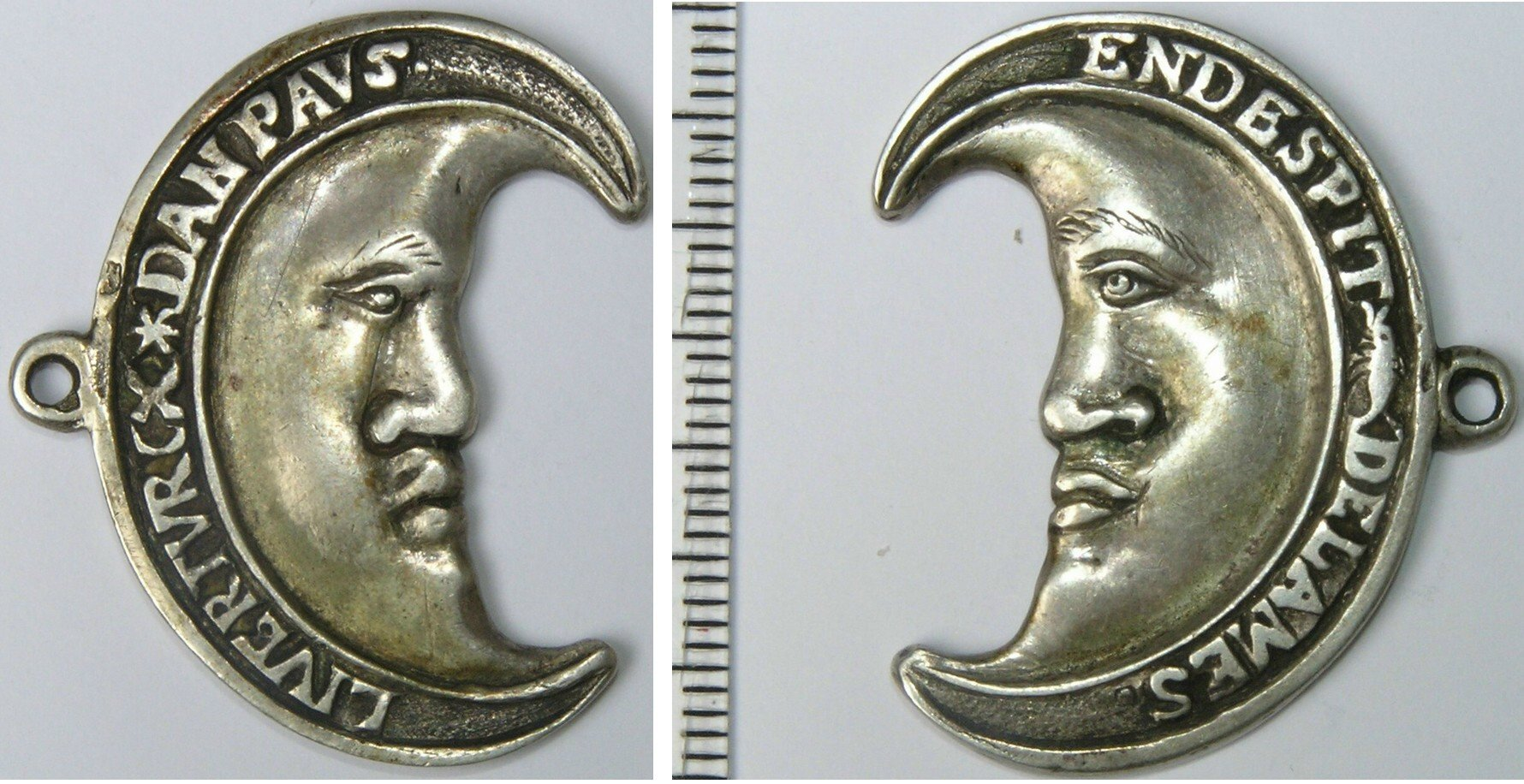
A Dutch crescent-shaped Geuzen medal at the time of the anti-Spanish Dutch Revolt, with the slogan "Liver Turcx dan paus, en despit de la mes." ("Rather Turkish than Papist, in spite of the Mass."), 1570.

Turco-Calvinism refers to the alliance or rapprochement between the followers of the Protestant Reformation and the Ottoman Empire during the 16th century.

This rapprochement occurred at the expense of the Catholic Habsburgs, as the Protestant Christians were struggling for survival in Europe and later entered into frontal conflict with the iconoclastic movement of 1567. Concomitantly the Ottoman Empire was also fighting against the Habsburgs for control of Central Europe. This rapprochement can be seen as a continuation of the Franco-Ottoman alliance established by Francis I of France from the beginning of the 16th century, although France, as a Catholic power, was most often an enemy to the Protestant powers of northern Europe.

The Dutch in particular were involved in these relations. Envoys were exchanged, and an Ottoman trading centre was established in Antwerp in agreement with the Sultan, where four Greeks were able to officiate. This rapprochement brought a stimulus to the development of Antwerp and the western seaboard. By 1612, Holland had established a formal embassy in the Ottoman Empire, following France (1534) and England.

== See also ==
- Islam and Protestantism
- Anglo-Turkish piracy
