= Luis Fajardo (Spanish Navy officer) =

Spanish admiral (c. 1556–1617)

Don Luis Fajardo
- Born: c. 1556; Murcia, Spain
- Died: 21 May 1617 (aged 60–61); Madrid, Spain
- Military career
- Allegiance: (Spain) Spanish Empire
- Branch: Spanish Navy
- Rank: Captain General
- Commands: Commander of the Armada de Tierra Firme (English: Tierra Firme fleet); Commander of the Armada de la Guardia de la Flota de Indias (English: Armada of the Guard); Commander of the Armada del Mar Océano (English: Armada of the Ocean Sea)
- Conflicts: Alpujarras Revolt (1568–1571); Eighty Years' War; Anglo-Spanish War (1585–1604); Dutch–Portuguese War; War against Anglo-Barbary piracy

Luis Fajardo y Ruíz de Avendaño, (c. 1556 – 21 May 1617), known simply as Luis Fajardo, was a Spanish admiral and nobleman who had an outstanding naval career in the Spanish Navy. He is considered one of the most reputable Spanish militaries of the last years of the reign of Philip II and the reign of Philip III. He held important positions in the navy and carried out several military operations in which he had to fight against English, Dutch, French and Barbary forces in the Atlantic, the Caribbean and the Mediterranean. He is known for the conquest of La Mamora in 1614.

Because he belonged to a noble family, he had several appointments such as Adelantado de Murcia, Knight of the Order of Calatrava and Commander of Almuradiel.

== Personal details ==
Coat of arms of the House of Los Vélez

Luis Fajardo was born around 1556 in Murcia, twenty-three years after the death of his father's only wife. He was the illegitimate son of Luis Fajardo y de la Cueva, 2nd Marquis of Los Vélez, Grandee of Spain and 1st Marquis de Molina. His mother was Ana Ruiz de Avendaño y Alarcón, a neighbor of Vélez-Blanco and a native of Villapalacios, in La Mancha.

Due to his illegitimate status, he did not initially have the same social status as the other children his father had previously fathered by his wife, Leonor Fernández de Córdoba. Later he managed to ascend socially, due to the military prestige he obtained during his naval career and the support of his influential paternal family, the House of Los Vélez. On the maternal side, Luis became the only son and heir of his mother.

His father later recognized the younger Luis as his son, due to his good relationship with his father and the rest of his paternal family. This allowed him to marry a noble woman, Luisa de Tenza, Lady of Espinardo, with whom he had three children. The marriage ties of his descendants, which he helped manage, also reinforced his social position, as well as that of his children, gaining large possessions for his family in Murcia.

His eldest son was Alonso Fajardo de Tenza, who became governor and captain general of the Philippines in 1616. His second son was Juan Fajardo de Tenza, who accompanied his father on military operations and also became an admiral, and was governor of Galicia. He also had a daughter named Mencía Fajardo de Tenza, who in 1609 married Juan Antonio Usodemar Narváez, lord of the village of Alcantarilla, a fact that initially did not please her father. In addition to the three children he had with Luisa, he had an illegitimate son named Luis with a single woman. Little is known about this son, except that he accompanied his brother Alonso to the Philippines.

== Military career ==
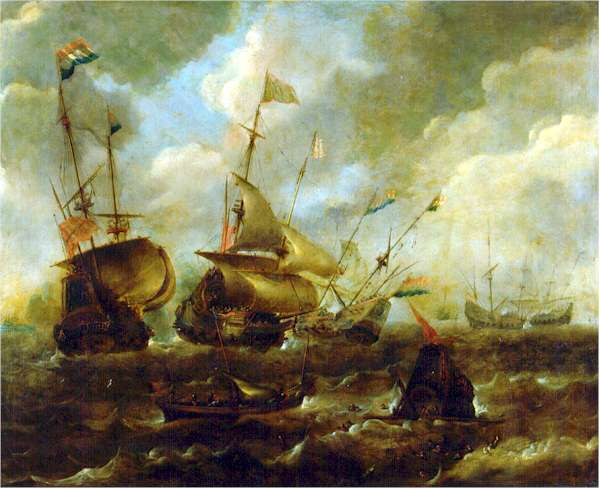
Dutch school painting depicting one of the many naval battles that took place between the Spanish and Dutch navies during the first half of the 17th century

While still very young he accompanied his father, along with his brother Diego, to suppress the Alpujarras Revolt (1568–1571). He was the standard-bearer for his father when the army left Vélez-Blanco, at the beginning of 1569, when he was thirteen years old. In June of that year, he was commissioned to defend Oria and Cantoria from the Moorish attack on the marquisate.

Later, he began his naval career in the Spanish Navy while still young, although the first news of his life in the navy dates back to the 1590s. In 1593, Fajardo was under the command of Francisco Coloma, captain general of the Armada de Tierra Firme, participating in the transshipment of the silver left in the Azores Islands for Luis Alfonso de Flores, with his fleet of 12 ships. The following year he was an overseer of the Armada de Tierra Firme and then succeeded Coloma in office.

In 1597, he carried out an inspection in Cádiz together with the lawyer Diego Armenteros, due to the Anglo-Dutch sacking of that port the previous year. He was also appointed by the king to preside over the proceedings against those responsible for this disaster.

In 1598, Fajardo was appointed captain general of the Armada de la Guardia de la Flota de Indias, charged with protecting the Spanish treasure fleet from privateers on their way to Spain, a dangerous and vital job for the Spanish Empire. This would be his main mission until his death, and for which he would obtain several honors from the king.

In 1600, Fajardo sent a report to the king, stating the convenience of having galleys in Cartagena de Indias for any eventuality. Between 1601 and 1602, in his work to protect the Spanish treasure fleet, he had some battles against an English fleet and even a combined Anglo-Dutch fleet, managing to successfully repel all these adversaries when they attacked him. In the battle against the combined fleet, which was 20 ships, superior to Fajardo's fleet of seven ships, he managed to damage the flagship and capture the vice-flagship and a patache, at the cost of 200 casualties between killed and wounded. In one of these battles, the English commanders Richard Leveson and Wiliam Monson had joined forces to attack him, but were unsuccessful in their attempt.

In November 1604, he was appointed captain general of the Armada del Mar Océano, replacing the late Admiral Alonso de Bazán. With this naval force he had the mission of protecting the Iberian coast of the Atlantic and the Strait of Gibraltar, also taking into account that it was the route of arrival of the Spanish treasure fleet. This led him to engage the fleets of Dutch, English or French privateers on several occasions, even on the coasts of America. (Note: At the beginning of the 17th century, the Ottoman front in the Mediterranean Sea was no longer the first threat to the Spanish Empire. Now it was the Dutch, French and English navies that were the biggest problem in the Atlantic Ocean.)

In 1605, Fajardo carried out with his fleet a punitive expedition to the Caribbean, more precisely in Araya, on the coasts of Cumaná and the Margarita Island. There he attacked by surprise a fleet of Dutch smugglers and privateers who were blocking the area and engaged in the illegal extraction of salt, destroying their fleet completely. This fact affected the Dutch industry, which depended on the product for various uses.

After the attack, he spent a brief time in the Caribbean chasing privateers before returning to Spain. The following year, he defeated the fleet of Dutch Admiral Willem Haultain at the Battle of Cape San Vicente, having done so with a makeshift fleet. This allowed lifting the blockade of the Spanish-Portuguese coast and the arrival of the Spanish treasure fleet that year.

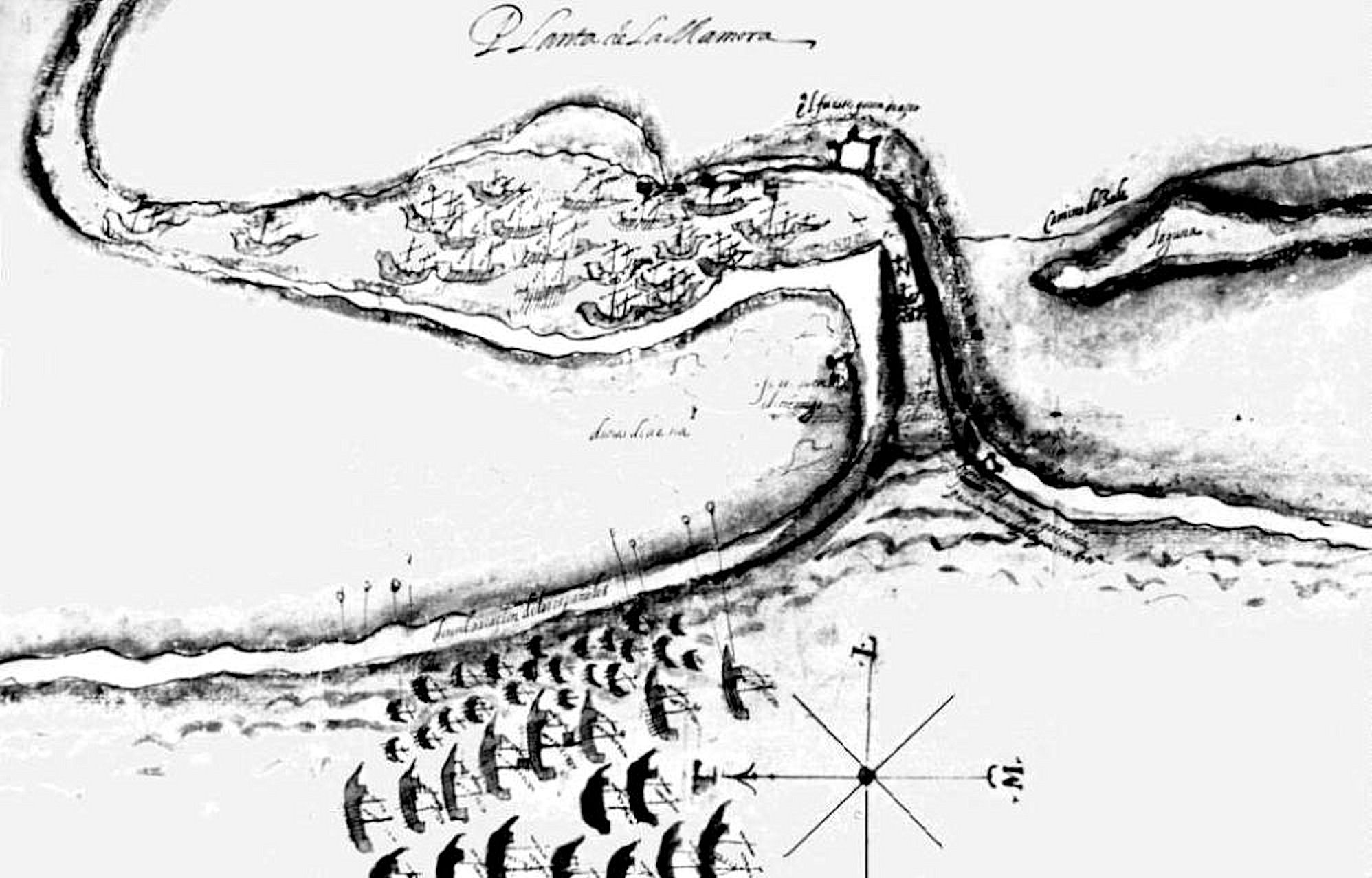
Drawing by an anonymous Spanish painter representing the place known as La Mamora in the 17th century

By 1607 his son Juan had begun to assist him in directing the Armada del Mar Océano, accompanying him on his main missions. In May 1609 he delivered a report to the king about the problems in the maintenance of the Spanish ships due to rot caused by inadequately curing the vessels.

With the Pax Hispanica, Fajardo was frequently in the Spanish Levante, dedicating himself to dealing with the growing threat of Anglo-Barbary piracy in the Mediterranean, and trying to hunt down renowned pirates such as Zymen Danseker and Jack Ward.

In June of that year, Fajardo commanded an expedition to the Barbary coast to pursue the pirate Danseker. He arrived at the Tunisian coast, where he attacked the fortified anchorage of La Goulette, destroying and capturing all the ships in the place, which made clear the Spanish capacity to face the pirates. Then he collaborated with part of the fleet in the expulsion of the Moorish from Spain.

In 1612, some four galleys of Fajardo's fleet captured the French privateer Jehan Philippe de Castelane's ship, which was carrying the entire collection of manuscripts from the Zaydani Library, belonging to the Moroccan Sultan Muley Zidan. The manuscripts were not returned by the Spanish Crown and became part of the Royal Library of El Escorial.

In August 1614, Fajardo commanded an expedition of almost 100 ships with 5,000 landing soldiers, with whom he conquered La Mamora, a military action that earned him great prestige for the measures he took during the attack, and for which he had no casualties. The conquest of the place deprived Muley Zidan of a haven for pirates and prevented this strategic place from falling into Dutch hands. (Note: At that time, the Dutch were negotiating with Muley Zidan for the cession of La Mamora, in order to have a naval station near the Strait of Gibraltar.)

During the last years of his life, he continued to command the Armada del Mar Océano and had some naval engagements along the Spanish Atlantic coast. Fajardo died on 21 May 1617, being succeeded in command of the aforementioned naval force by Fadrique de Toledo, 1st Marquess of Valdueza. His death also produced disputes regarding his son, Juan, and also Antonio de Oquendo, his protégé during his lifetime.

== See also ==
- Spanish Golden Age
- Habsburg Spain

== Sources ==
- Rodríguez Pérez, Raimundo A.; Hernández Franco, Juan (2013). "Marinos, caballeros y monjas. Los bastardos de la casa de los Vélez, siglos XVI y XVII". Revista velezana (in Spanish) (31). España: 38–47.
- Rodríguez Pérez, Raimundo A. (2010). Un linaje aristocrático en la España de los Habsburgo: Los marqueses de los Vélez (1477-1597) (PDF) (in Spanish). Murcia, España: Universidad de Murcia.
- "Luis Fajardo". Diccionario Biográfico Español (in Spanish). Real Academia de la Historia.
- Fernández Duro, Cesáreo (1896). Armada española desde la unión de los reinos de Castilla y Aragón (in Spanish). Vol. III. Madrid, España: Instituto de Historia y Cultura Naval.
