= A Christian Turn'd Turk =

1612 English play

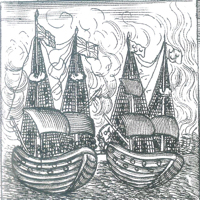
- John Ward's ship engages a British vessel
- Original language: English
- Written by: Robert Daborne
- Characters: 25
- Subject: Religious conversion / Piracy / Islam / Protestantism / Religion
- Setting: Tunis

Premiere
- Date: 1612
- Place: England

A Christian Turn'd Turk is a 1612 play by the English dramatist Robert Daborne. It concerns the conversion of the pirate John Ward to Islam.

== Characters ==
The list of dramatis personae printed in the 1612 quarto is incomplete and inaccurate. The list has been revised, missing characters' names added, "ghost characters" removed, and inconsistencies corrected.

- Ward - English pirate captain
- Dansiker - Dutch pirate captain
- Francisco - Pirate captain
- Gismund - Ward's officer
- Sares - Dansiker's captain
- Lieutenant - Dansiker's officer
- Monsieur Davy - Master of a French merchant ship
- Ferdinand - French merchant
- Albert - French merchant
- Lemot - French gentleman, Alizia's brother
- Carolo - French gentleman, friend of Lemot
- Frederick - French gentleman
- Raymond - French gentleman
- First Son - Son to Raymond
- Second Son - Later Raymond, eponymous son of Raymond
- Governor - Viceroy of Tunis
- Crosman - Captain of the janissaries in Tunis, Voada's brother
- Mufti - Religious leader to the Muslim community of Tunis
- Mulli - A Turk of Tunis
- Benwash - A wealthy Jewish merchant
- Ruben Rabshake - Servant to Benwash
- Alizia - Sister to Lemot, disguised as a sailor's boy, then as the page Fidelio. Betrothed to Raymond the younger.
- Agar - Turkish wife of Benwash
- Voada - Sister of Crosman, married to Ward after his conversion

== Background ==
A Christian Turn'd Turk was entered into the Stationers' Register on 1 February 1612 (new style) and was published in quarto format later that year by the bookseller William Barrenger.

=== John Ward ===
An Early Modern map of Tunis by Willem Jansz Blaeu

A Christian Turn'd Turk's protagonist John Ward is based on the historical figure of the same name. A notorious pirate, he operated along the Barbary coast in the early 17th century and was also known by the name Jack Ward. Tales of Ward's piracy heavily influenced A Christian Turn'd Turk. Dabourne based his depiction of Ward on two pamphlets which recounted tales of Ward's piracy. The pamphlets portrayed him as an engaging antihero and a risk-taker who rose from poverty to riches. Ward's capturing of foreign ships was lauded in several popular ballads but there was still concern in England regarding 'his crimes against God'. Ward would later make an agreement with the Turks to use Tunis as a base for his piratical operations and would attack Christian ships in an attempt to steal their lucrative cargo. Despite Ward's attacks on Christian ships, he remained a popular figure during the early years of James I's reign. James I's proclamation against piracy in 1608-9 added to the almost mythical status Ward had cultivated, derived from his capture of a rich Venetian argosy in 1607. However, his conversion to Islam and assumption of the name Yusuf Reis was considered scandalous, and his relentless and indiscriminate attacks on sailing vessels caused concerns about the amount of money England was losing as a result of his piracy.

=== Apostasy ===
Ward's conversion is a pivotal part of A Christian Turn'd Turk and relates to contemporary concerns regarding apostasy. Converting to another faith was considered heretical by the English with Judaism and Islam portrayed as the most undesirable religions. The actions of Ward and other pirates were decried not only because of their criminality but also because of the temptation for other Christians to turn to piracy or to Islam for economic gain. The ease of conversion to Islam and the lack of regret amongst those who had converted was surprising, and the lack of divine retribution for converts because of their heresy unsettling. Despite Ward's conversion and incessant piracy, he was flourishing in Tunis without undergoing divine or human punishment for his apostasy.

== Synopsis ==
In the play, Ward converts to Islam in order to marry Voada, a beautiful Turkish woman with whom he has fallen in love. Ward's conversion to Islam (portrayed in dumbshow) is contrasted with the repentance and pardon of Simon Dansiker, the other pirate captain in the play (also shown in dumbshow). Dansiker's reform is complicated by the reluctance of the French merchants he's robbed to accept him—until he returns to Tunis to apprehend the renegade Jew, Benwash. The unrepentant Ward dies at the end of the play—though he delivers an anti-Muslim rant that conforms to the prejudices of the play's original audience. (This was a large leap of dramatic license on Daborne's part, since the real Ward would die eleven years after the play was written.)

== Key scenes ==
=== Dumb show ===
The dumb show of Act I Scene VIII depicts Ward's conversion ceremony. As with other dumb shows, there are magical and supernatural overtones as well as high-ranking officials represented by the Muftis who administer the ceremony. The scene was presented as a dumb show in order to display the solemnity and spiritual importance of Ward's supposed conversion. The scene contains many elements which portray contemporary conceptions of Islam and how Islamic conversion ceremony may be carried out. Daborne looked towards contemporary accounts of Islamic conversion to draw inspiration and gain ideas on how to stage the scene. The head of Mahomet, a common prop of the period, was used to emphasise the religious nature of the scene but also to highlight Islam's status as a pagan faith.

== Modern Productions ==
An extract of Robert Daborne's A Christian Turn'd Turk was performed as part of a special Read Not Dead event at Shakespeare's Globe in the newly constructed Sam Wanamaker Playhouse. Four directors and four scholars were teamed up with actors and presented their arguments with selected scenes at a special hustings event on Thursday 29 May 2014. David Oakes teamed with Dr Emma Smith of the University of Oxford presented the case for Daborne's play. Alex Lanipekun performed the part of Capt. Ward, Helen Bradbury as Voada, Adam Ewan as Dansiker and Matthew Houlihan in various other parts. The play was subsequently selected to be performed on Sunday 5 October 2014 in the Sam Wanamaker Playhouse with the following cast:

- Ward - Ben Lamb
- Dansiker - John Gregor
- Francisco - Helen Bradbury
- Gismund - Colin Ryan
- Gallop - Doug Rao
- Sares - Alex Harcourt-Smith
- Lieutenant - Frances Marshall
- Monsieur Davy - Matthew Houlihan
- Ferdinand - Robert Macpherson
- Albert - Robert Heard
- Alizia - Beth Park
- Lemot - Patrick Osborne
- Governor - David Whitworth
- Raymond - David Whitworth
- First Son - Frances Marshall
- Second Son - Robert Heard
- Crosman - Adam Ewan
- Mufti - Patrick Osborne
- Mulli - Frances Marshall
- Benwash - Martin Hodgson
- Ruben Rabshake - Mark Oosterveen
- Agar - Heather Saunders
- Voada - Madeleine Hyland

== Bibliography ==
- Vitkus, Daniel (2000). Three Turk Plays: From Early Modern England. Chichester: Columbia University Press. ISBN 0-231-11029-4.
- Gil Harries, Jonathan (2004). Sick Economies : Drama, Mercantilism, and Disease in Shakespeare's England. Philadelphia: University of Pennsylvania Press. ISBN 0-8122-3773-0.
- Potter, Lois (1996). "Pirates and "turning Turk" in Renaissance Drama". In Maquerlot, Jean-Pierre; Willems, Michèle (eds.). Travel and Drama in Shakespeare's Time. Cambridge and New York: Cambridge University Press. ISBN 0-521-47500-7.
- Matar, Nabil (1998). Islam in Britain: 1558-1685. Cambridge: Cambridge University Press. ISBN 0-521-62233-6.
- Vitkus, Daniel (2003). Turning Turk: English Theater and the Multicultural Mediterranean, 1570-1630. Basingstoke and New York: Palgrave Macmillan. ISBN 0-312-29452-2.
- Mazzola, Elizabeth (1998). The Pathology of the English Renaissance: Sacred Remains and Holy Ghosts. Leiden and Boston: Brill. ISBN 90-04-11195-6.
- Mehl, Dieter (1982) [First published 1965]. The Elizabethan Dumb Show: The History of a Dramatic Convention. London and New York City: Methuen. ISBN 0-416-33980-8.
