= Sir Richard Young, 1st Baronet =

English courtier and politician

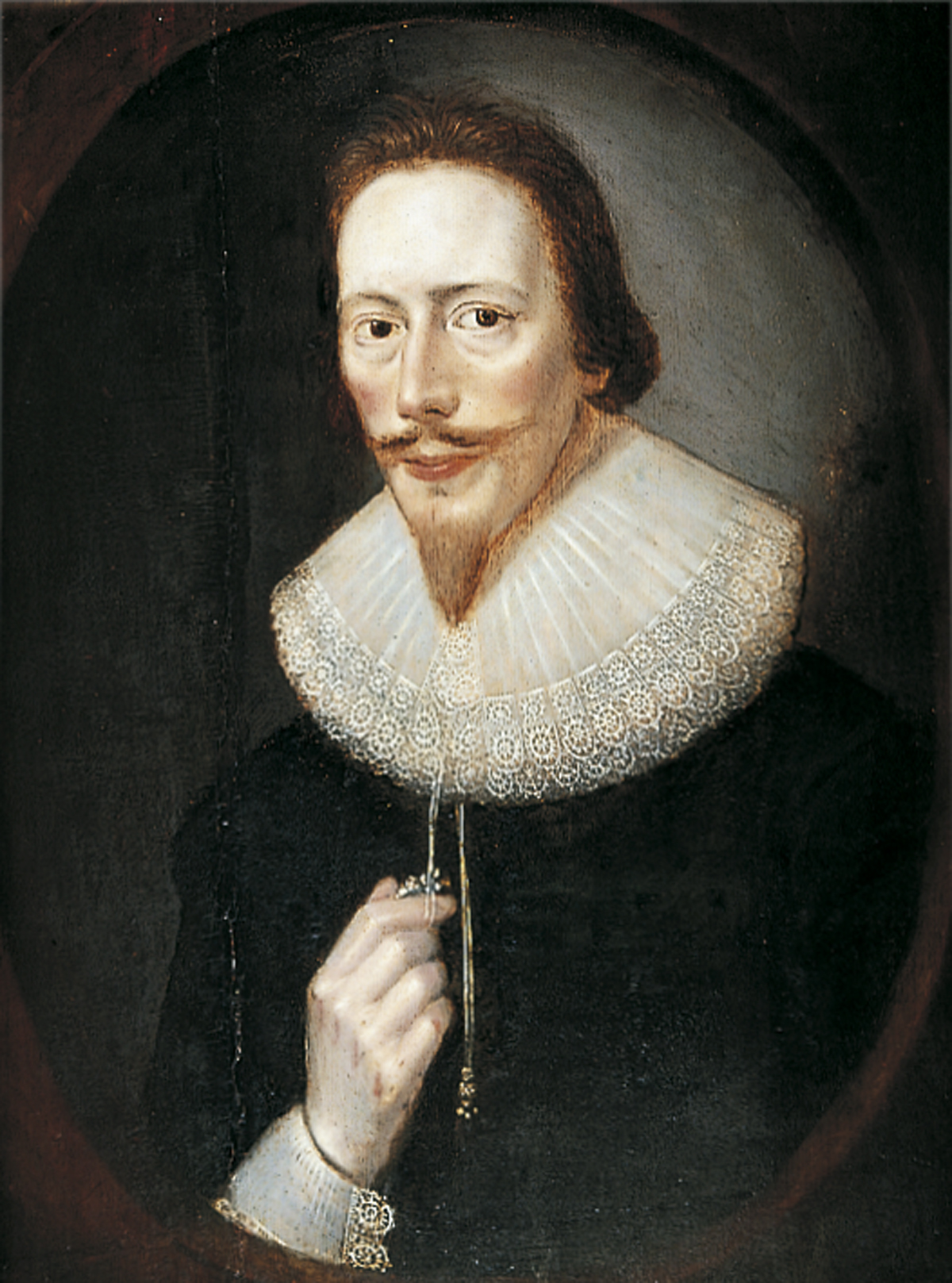
A painting of Richard Young by Cornelis Janssens van Ceulen

Sir Richard Young, 1st Baronet (c. 1580–1651) was an English courtier and politician who sat in the House of Commons between 1605 and 1624.

== Biography ==
Young was born to a Welsh family and educated at Lincoln's Inn, in London. Circa 1603 he became secretary to Edward la Zouche, 11th Baron Zouche, the recently appointed Council of Wales and the Marches. With the creation of the new parliamentary seat of Bewdley in Worcestershire, Zouche nominated Young for the seat, which he held from 1605 until 1610. As an MP, he was active in defence of his employer's activities, but Zouche losing office meant that he had no sponsor to re-enter parliament; he did not stand for re-election in 1614.

Young remained working for Zouche until 1617, when he moved to work as an additional secretary for Francis Bacon, the Lord Keeper of the Great Seal. Bacon was a major figure in court politics, and Young benefited greatly; he was knighted in 1618, and received a number of profitable sinecures, and shares in the East India Company. The same year, he married Lady Martha Hayes, widow of Sir Thomas Hayes, a wealthy merchant and former Lord Mayor of London.

In 1620, through the influence of Zouche (now the Lord Warden of the Cinque Ports), he was nominated and elected as the MP for Dover. He was a moderately active member, but was caught up in the scandal surrounding Bacon's impeachment for corruption in 1621; however, he gave damning evidence against Bacon and confessed to some minor crimes of his own, and was able to escape with his career intact and with increased royal favour; he was made a gentleman of the privy chamber later that year, and cemented King James's opinion of him by rescuing him from an icy New River in January 1622.

Young was again elected in 1624, again with Zouche's support, but the election was voided following a lawsuit by Sir Henry Mainwaring. Mainwaring had been the other member for Dover in the 1620 election, but had fallen out with Zouche, who insisted to his successor as Lord Warden that he not be nominated in 1624. After further legal manoeuvring, Young was re-elected without significant opposition. However, Zouche's departure meant that he no longer had a patron, and he did not stand for re-election in 1625.

After standing down, he was created a baronet in 1628; bought (and quickly resold) a country estate at Shalden; and became a founding partner of the Guinea Company, which held a monopoly on the West African gold trade, and also traded for ivory and slaves. By 1635, he was wealthy enough to make a loan of £2,000 to the King. However, Young's final years were embroiled in a lawsuit with George Mynne, whose position as clerk of the Hanaper had been assigned to Young in 1634. The case stretched on into the early years of the Civil War, and while Young did retain the office, the majority of his assets were impounded or seized by the Parliamentarian Committee for the Advance of Money. By 1647 he still retained sufficient assets to pay a fine of £47, but in 1649 he was recorded as defaulting on a mortgage; in the following years he was committed to the Fleet Prison for debt, where he died intestate in 1651.

Parliament of England
Preceded by Constituency enfranchised	Member of Parliament for Bewdley; 1605–1611	Succeeded by James Button
Preceded by Sir George Fane; Sir Robert Brett	Member of Parliament for Dover; 1621; With: Sir Henry Mainwaring; Sir Edward Cecil	Succeeded by Sir John Hippisley; William Beecher
Baronetage of England
New creation	Baronet (of London); 1628–1651	Extinct
