= Treaty of La Goulette =

Treaty of La Goulette (1868)
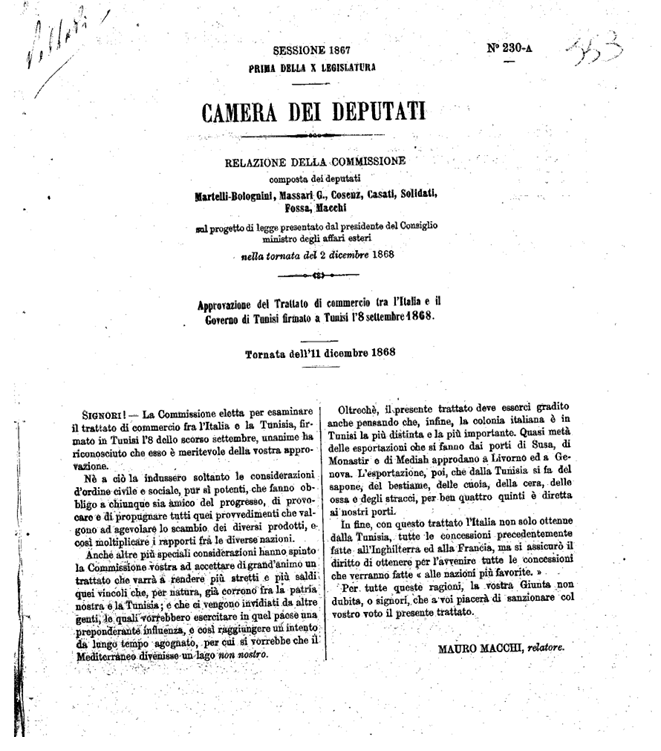
- Approval by the Chamber of Deputies (Italy) of the Commercial Treaty between Italy and the Government of Tunis signed in Tunis on 8 September 1868
- Location: La Goulette, Tunisia
- Sealed: 8 September 1868
- Effective: 21 January 1869; 157 years ago
- Replaces: 1833 treaty between the Kingdom of the Two Sicilies and the Bey of Tunis
- Signatories: Victor Emanuel II; Muhammad III as-Sadiq
- Parties: Kingdom of Italy; Beylik of Tunis
- Languages: Arabic; Italian

The Treaty of La Goulette was a treaty signed on September 8, 1868, between the Beylik of Tunis and the Kingdom of Italy in La Goulette, Tunisia. The treaty designated Italy as Tunisia’s "most favoured nation" at the time, aiming to strengthen economic ties between the two countries, protect the existing Italian diaspora in Tunisia, and encourage the settlement of future Italian migrants from various social classes. The treaty became effective on 21 January 1869.

== Notes ==
- Filippo Caparelli, Civiltà italiana in Tunisia, Roma, S. A. Tipografia Editrice Italia, 1939, 204 pp. (contiene il testo integrale del trattato)
