= Captain Ward and the Rainbow =

Traditional song

Song
- Genre: Folk
- Songwriter: Traditional

Captain Ward and the Rainbow, or Ward the Pirate (Roud 224, Child 287) is an English-language folk song. It recounts a tale of the pirate Captain Ward, likely Jack Ward.

== Synopsis ==
The king sends a ship, the Rainbow, after Captain Ward. In one variant, the ship carries 500 seamen, in another it carries 1,300. Ward defeats the Rainbow and sends taunts back to the king, "If he reign king of all the land, I will reign king at sea." In many variants, Ward claims to have never harmed an English ship.

== Lyrics ==
Come all you gallant seamen bold,
All you that march to drum,
Let's go and look for Captain Ward,
Far on the sea he roams;
He is the biggest robber
That ever you did hear,
There's not been such a robber found
For above this hundred year.

A ship was sailing from the east
And going to the west,
Loaded with silks and satins
And velvets of the best,
But meeting there with Captain Ward,
It proved a bad meeting;
He robbèd them of all their wealth
And bid them tell their king.

O then the king provided a ship of noble fame,
She's call'd the "Royal Rainbow,"
If you would know her name;
She was as well provided for
As any ship could be,
Full thirteen hundred men on board
To bear her company.

'Twas eight o' clock in the morning
When they began to fight,
And so they did continue there
Till nine o' clock at night.
"Fight on, fight on," says Captain Ward,
"This sport well pleases me,
For if you fight this month or more,
Your master I will be."

O then the gallant "Rainbow"
She fired, she fired in vain,
Till six and thirty of her men
All on the deck were slain.
"Go home, go home," says Captain Ward,
"And tell your king from me,
If he reigns king on all the land,

Ward will reign king on sea!"

== See also ==
- List of the Child Ballads
- Scottish mythology
- English folklore

== Musical adaptations ==
- The song was set for four-part chorus (TTBB) by Ralph Vaughan Williams in Folk Songs from the Eastern Counties (1912). Vaughan Williams had previously (1906) made use of the melody in his Norfolk Rhapsodies.
- Being a well-documented song and publicised by English Folk Dance and Song Society, The Broadside Ballads Project, and Mainly Norfolk, the song was recorded by Jon Boden and Oli Steadman for inclusion in their respective lists of daily folk songs "A Folk Song a Day" and "365 Days Of Folk".
