= Fort de la Goulette =

Prison in Tunisia

Fort of La Goulette
- Karraka
- La Goulette, Tunisia in Tunisia

Site information
- Type: Coastal fortress
- Open to the public: Occasionally (cultural events)
- Condition: Partially preserved

Site history
- Built: 1535
- Built by: Spanish Empire
- Materials: Stone, masonry

The Fort of La Goulette (also known as the Karraka) is a coastal fortress in La Goulette, at the entrance of the Lake of Tunis. It was built by the Spanish in 1535 after the conquest of Tunis by Charles V, to secure access to the city and the lagoon. The Ottomans captured it in 1574, and the site was later reused as a prison during the 19th century, which explains the popular Tunisian use of the word Karraka to mean "penitentiary".

== Toponymy ==
The name Karraka derives from the Spanish word carraca, which originally referred to a type of ship and later to arsenals and related fortifications. In Tunisia, the term eventually came to mean a place of detention, because the fort served as a prison in the 19th century.

== History ==
The first fort was built in 1535 by the Spanish as a square bastioned structure with four corner towers named St. Michael, St. James, St. George and St. Barbara. Under Philip II in the mid-16th century, the defenses were extended to include a six-bastion enceinte enclosing a new town ("New Goulette"), while the original fort was then called "Old Goulette".

In 1574, the Ottomans reconquered Tunis and La Goulette, repairing parts of the defenses and keeping a small garrison of janissaries on site. In 1640, Maltese galleys raided the harbor, which prompted the dey Ahmed Khodja to order the construction of a new round fort in the 17th century. From then on, the site featured two adjacent works: the Spanish square fort and the Ottoman round fort.

Together with the Fort of Chikly and the Nova Arx near Tunis, the Karraka formed a defensive system controlling access from the sea to the capital.

== Architecture ==
The Spanish fort was a square bastioned plan, later integrated into a wider enceinte with six bastions. Ottoman additions included the construction of a round fort covering the channel between the sea and the lake.

== Later use ==
During the 19th century, the fort was converted into a prison. This function popularized the word Karraka in Tunisian dialect to mean "jail" or "penitentiary". In the 21st century, the site occasionally hosts cultural activities, including the Mediterranean Festival of La Goulette.

== See also ==
- History of Tunis
