= La Goulette =

La Goulette حلق الوادي
- Municipality
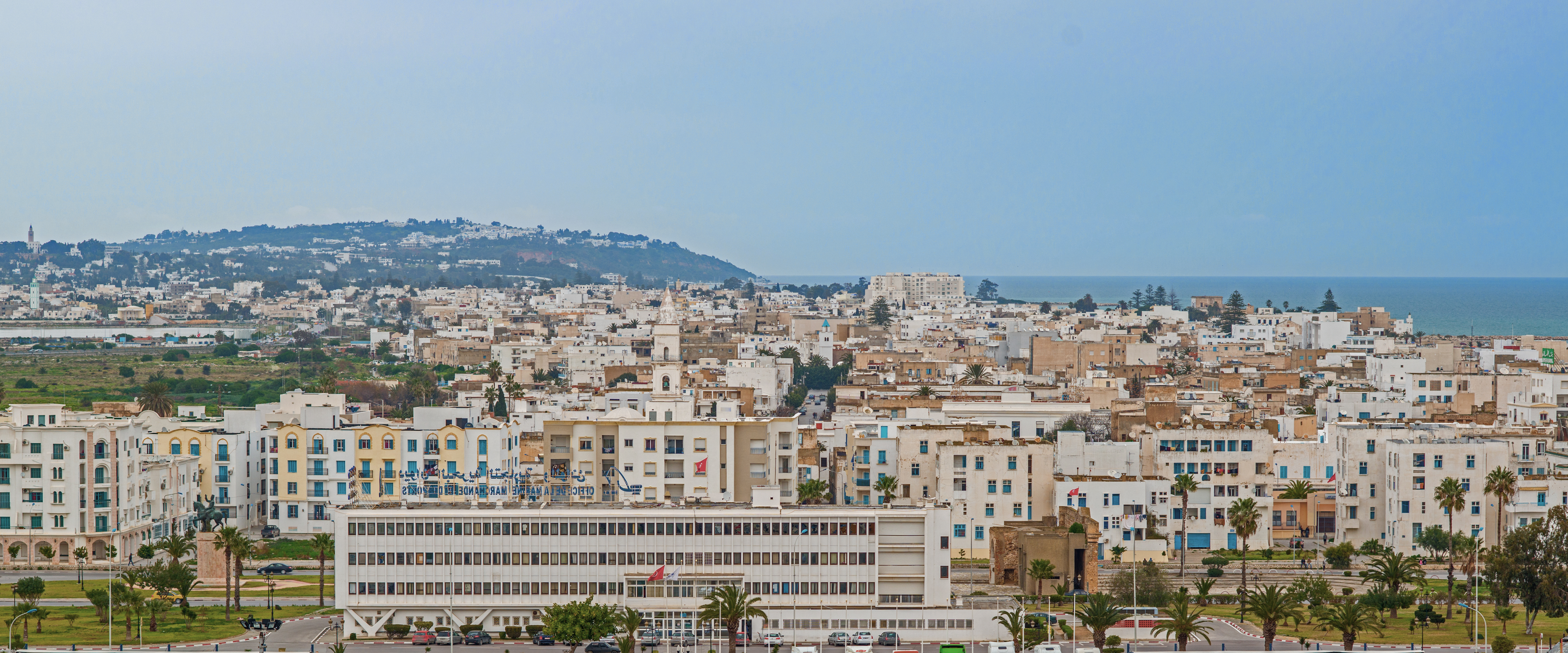
- Panorama of La Goulette

- Location in Tunisia
- Coordinates: 36°49′5″N 10°18′18″E
- Country: Tunisia
- Governorate: Tunis Governorate
- Delegation(s): La Goulette

Government
  - Mayor: Amel Limam (Tahya Tounes)

Population (2014)
  - Total: 45,711
- Time zone: UTC1 (CET)

La Goulette (French: [la ɡulɛt]; Italian: La Goletta), also known by the endonym Halq al-Wadi (Arabic: حلق الوادي, romanized: Ḥalq al-Wādī, Tunisian Arabic pronunciation: [ˈħalq əlˈwɛːd], lit. 'the River's Throat'), is a municipality and the port of Tunis, Tunisia.

La Goulette is located at around 36°49′5″N 10°18′18″E on a sandbar between Lake Tūnis and the Gulf of Tunis. The port, located 12km east of Tunis, is the point of convergence of Tunisia's major road and rail networks. La Goulette is linked to Tunis by the TGM railway and to Europe by a ferry service.

== Origin of the name ==
The name derives from the "gullet" or "river's throat", a channel where the city is located – and not from the ship type schooner, called goulette, gulet, goleta or goletta in French, Turkish, Spanish and Italian, respectively.

== Transit activities ==
In addition to its transit and cruise activities, the port of La Goulette also receives ships carrying cargoes such as cars, and bulk cereals. It handles a large portion of the country's imports and much of its exports (principally phosphates, iron ore, and fruits and vegetables).

However, the development plan of the port provides for its specialization as a port exclusively reserved for passenger and tourist traffic.

== History ==
The Fort de la Goulette, a kasbah fortress, was built in 1535 by Charles I of Spain, but was captured by the Ottoman Turks in 1574. The remains of Hispano-Turkish fortifications lie inland.

The port was a popular destination for summer holidays in the 19th century. La Goulette's Sicilian town quarter became commonly known as la Petite Sicile ("Little "Sicily"). It once housed a prominent Italian community – among others the actress Claudia Cardinale. It was also home to sizeable Jewish and Maltese communities. In 1868, the Treaty of La Goulette was signed here.

== Population ==
2014 Census
Homes	Families	Males	Females	Total
17930	12658	22889	22822	45711

- Media related to La Goulette at Wikimedia Commons

== See also ==
- European enclaves in North Africa before 1830
- Tunisian navy (1705-1881)
- Luis Fajardo, attacked this place in 1609
- Tunisian Italians
