= Villapalacios =

Town in Castile-La Mancha, Spain

Coordinates: 38°35′N 2°38′W

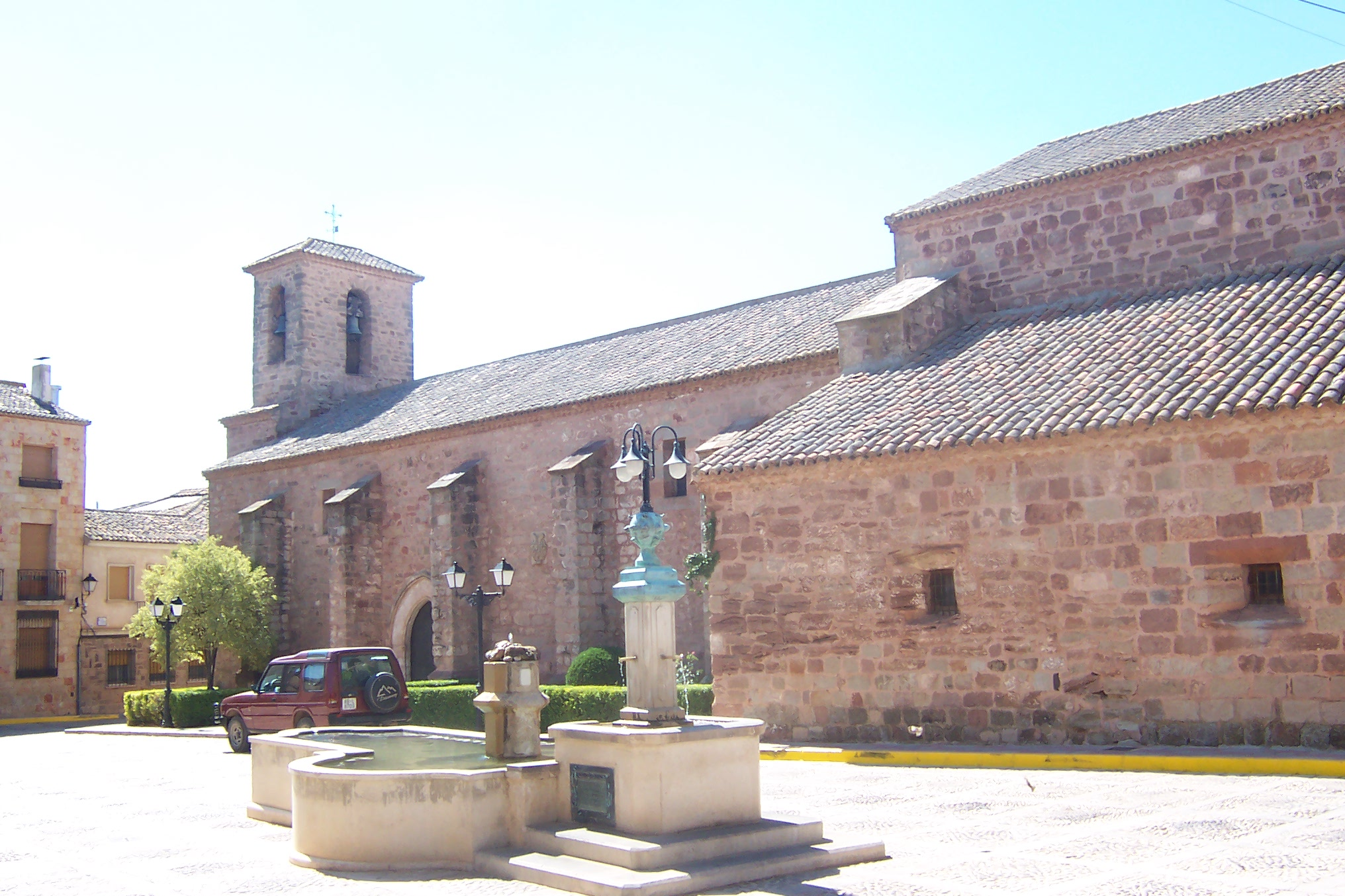
The Parish Church of San Sebastián in Villapalacios

Coat of arms of Vilapalacios

Villapalacios is a municipality in Albacete, Castile-La Mancha, Spain. It has a population of 553 as of 2023. The hamlet houses the gothic style church of San Sebastián.
