= Norfolk Rhapsodies =

Orchestral music by Ralph Vaughan Williams

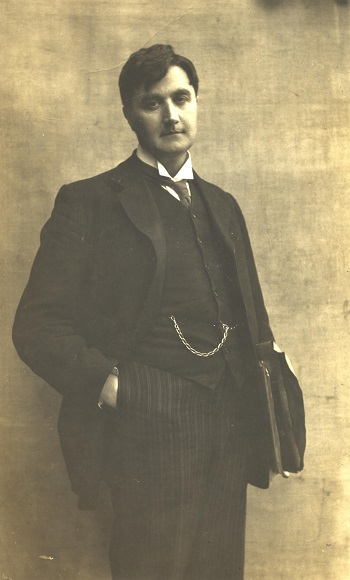
Ralph Vaughan Williams in 1910

The Norfolk Rhapsodies are three orchestral rhapsodies by Ralph Vaughan Williams, drafted in 1905–06. They were based on folk songs Vaughan Williams had collected in the English county of Norfolk, in particular the fishing port of King's Lynn in January 1905. Only the first rhapsody survives in its entirety, having been revised by the composer in 1914. The second exists in fragmentary form, and has been completed by other hands. The third is lost.

The three rhapsodies together were originally intended to form a sort of folk-song symphony. The First Rhapsody corresponded to the first movement, the Second Rhapsody combines the second and third movements of the symphony, with the scherzo occurring as an inserted episode of the slow movement. The Third Rhapsody was the finale, using four tunes formed as a quick march and trio.

== Norfolk Rhapsody No. 1 in E minor ==
The first rhapsody was written in 1906, and revised in 1914. It was premiered in London on 23 August 1906 conducted by Henry Wood, and was later substantially revised for a performance in Bournemouth in May 1914. It begins with an introduction based on two songs, "The Captain's Apprentice" and "The Bold Young Sailor", followed by the main allegro movement, employing three songs; "A Basket of Eggs", "On Board a Ninety-eight" and "Ward, the Pirate". Vaughan Williams had collected several of these songs in the North End of King's Lynn which was home to the majority of the port's fishing community.

== Norfolk Rhapsody No. 2 in D minor ==
This rhapsody employs "Young Henry the Poacher", "Spurn Point" and "Ward, the Pirate", already presented in the First Rhapsody. Its final pages are lost, but have been reconstructed by Stephen Hogger.

The second and third rhapsodies were first performed together under the composer's baton at the Cardiff Festival in September 1907 and later in London in April 1912 but were then withdrawn. Vaughan Williams did not publish the Second Rhapsody, and appears to have withdrawn it at the time of the extensive revision of the First Rhapsody in 1914, reusing some of its material for the Six Studies in English Folk Song (1926). Nevertheless, the manuscript score survived except for the last two pages. The missing ending was reconstructed in 2002 by Stephen Hogger for a CD recording by the London Symphony Orchestra conducted by Richard Hickox. Although this recording was apparently permitted by the RVW Society on the understanding that it would be a "one-off exhumation", the same orchestra and conductor gave the restored score a public performance at a Musicians' Benevolent Fund Royal Concert at the Barbican Centre in 2004.

== Norfolk Rhapsody No. 3 ==
This rhapsody was discarded entirely by 1920, and is now lost.

David Matthews was commissioned by the Ralph Vaughan Williams Society to compose a new work based on W.A. Morgan's 1907 programme note for the lost third rhapsody. Norfolk March was premiered at the English Music Festival in 2016. The March has since been recorded by Dutton Epoch CDLX7351, performed by the Royal Scottish Symphony Orchestra, conducted by Martin Yates.
