= Miguel de Oquendo =

Spanish Navy officer

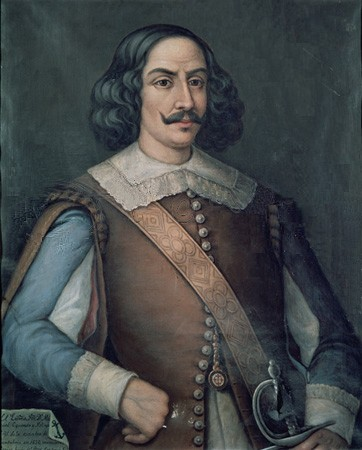
- Born: 1534; San Sebastián, Spanish Empire
- Died: 1588 (aged 53–54); At sea
- Occupation: Admiral
- Known for: Participating in the Spanish Armada campaign
- Children: Antonio de Oquendo

Miguel de Oquendo y Segura (1534 - 1588) was a Spanish Navy officer. Born in San Sebastián in 1534, he died at sea in 1588 when returning from the Spanish Armada campaign. He was the father of Admiral Antonio de Oquendo.

== Principal events of his life ==
- 1575 Took part with his own ship in the voyage of Orán.
- 1582 As Captain General of the Guipúzcoa Squadron, took part in the Battle of Terceira under Álvaro de Bazán.
- 1583 Took part in the landing and conquest of Terceira, having himself reconnoitred its coast.
- 1588 Commanded the Guipuzcoa Squadron and, with Recalde, he was second in command of the Spanish Armada. His ship caught fire and had to be abandoned. He died at sea during the return journey and was succeeded by Captain Diego de Medrano, General of the Galleys, who served as Interim Admiral of the Spanish Armada.
