= Zymen Danseker =

Dutch privateer and corsair (c. 1579 – c. 1615)

Siemen Danziger
- Born: c. 1579; Dordrecht, County of Holland, Holy Roman Empire
- Died: c. 1615; Algiers, Kingdom of Algiers
- Piratical career
- Nickname: Simon Re'is
- Type: Barbary corsair
- Allegiance: Kingdom of Algiers
- Years active: 1600s–1610s
- Rank: Admiral
- Base of operations: Barbary coast
- Battles: Eighty Years' War

Zymen Danseker (c. 1579 – c. 1615), better known by his anglicized names Siemen Danziger and Simon de Danser, was a 17th-century Dutch privateer and Barbary corsair based in Ottoman Algeria. His name is also written Danziker, Dansker, Dansa or Danser.

Danseker and the English pirate John Ward were the two most prominent renegades operating in the Barbary coast during the early 17th century. Both were said to command squadrons in Algiers and Tunis that were equal to their European counterparts, and, as allies, together represented a formidable naval power (much as had Aruj and Hayreddin Barbarossa in the previous century). Later in his Barbary career, Danseker became known by the Turkish epithet Simon Re'is.

Commanding a vast squadron made up of English and Turks while in the service of Algiers, Danseker captured more than 40 ships in a two-year period after "turning Turk". Both men are featured prominently in Kitab al-Munis fi Akhbar Ifriqiya wa Tunis written by Tunisian writer and historian Ibn Abi Dinar.

== Biography ==
Kitāb al-muʾnis fī akhbār Afrīqiyah wa-Tūnis

A Dutchman, Danseker served as a privateer in the Eighty Years' War. He settled in Marseilles, France, marrying the governor's daughter. In 1607 he stole a ship and sailed for Algiers. Finding himself in the service of Redwan Pasha of Algiers, he led a brief but infamous career as a Barbary corsair. According to Ina B. McCabe, he introduced the round ship.

It is unclear why he became a corsair. He was made welcome as an enemy of the Spaniards and, within a year of his arrival became a leading captain of the taife reisi. Often bringing Spanish prizes and prisoners to Algiers, due to his exploits he became known under the names Simon Re'is, Deli-Reis (Captain Crazy) and Deli Kapitan among the people on the Barbary coast and the Turks. He incorporated captured ships into his fleet, and was supplied by Algiers with men and the use of their shipyards. He was also the first to lead the Algiers through the Straits of Gibraltar, the farthest distance they had ever successfully navigated, and traveled as far as Iceland, which would later be attacked by Barbary corsairs in 1616. Simon took at least forty ships and sank many during the three years that followed. After three more years of pirating, he had become quite rich and lived in an opulent palace. Simon the Dancer attacked ships of any nation, making trading in the Mediterranean Sea increasingly difficult for every nation. Many nations therefore looked for ways to stop his attacks (by counterattack, bribes for safe-passage or employing him as a privateer in their navy).

Simon soon became acquainted with other renegades, particularly English pirates Peter Easton and Jack Ward. He formed a powerful alliance with the latter. Eventually, a French fleet under the command of De Beaulieu de Pairsac, assisted by eight Spanish galleys, for a short time threatened to capture him, but because of a sudden storm he was able to escape; he sailed along the coast with his ships where his pursuers could not reach them. Eight more Spanish men-of-war, under the command of Don Luis Fajardo and Beaulieu, also tried to capture Simon in a joint raid on Tunis, but the corsair escaped. Another English squadron, under the command of Sir Thomas Shoreley failed equally.

In 1609, while taking a Spanish galleon off Valencia, Danziger sent a message to Henri IV and the French court through the Jesuit priests on board. He wanted to return to Marseilles, having long ago left his wife and children behind, and sought to be exonerated for his crimes. He was reunited with his family later that year, shortly after arriving in Marseilles (where a pardon awaited him) with four well-armed warships on November 17, 1609. Welcomed by the Duke of Guise, he presented to him "a present of some Turks, who were at once sent to the galleys", as well as a considerable sum in Spanish gold. This was the spark that ignited the Franco-Algerian war of 1609–1628.

Danseker had been residing in Marseilles for a year when French authorities asked him to lead an expedition against the corsairs. Despite rumors of his capture, he returned to France later that same year. In 1615 he was called up by Louis XIII to negotiate the release of French ships being held by Yusuf Dey in Tunis. According to the account of William Lithgow, Danseker was led ashore in a ruse by Yusuf, captured by janissaries, and beheaded.
