= Robert Daborne =

16th/17th-century English playwright

Robert Daborne (c. 1580 – 23 March 1628) was an English dramatist of the Jacobean era.

His father was also Robert Daborne, heir to family property in Guildford, Surrey and other places, including London, and a wealthy haberdasher by trade. He is now thought to have been a "sizar"—an undergraduate exempt from fees—at King's College, Cambridge in 1598. His marriage record suggests that he was a gentleman and member of the Inner Temple. Daborne was married to Anne Younger in 1602 at St Mary's Church in South Walsham by the local cleric, who was nephew to Anne's father, Robert Younger, the owner of Old Hall in South Burlingham; they had at least one child, a daughter, but his wife Anne died in childbirth. He was living with his father-in-law in Shoreditch by 1609, but his father-in-law died and there was a bitter dispute among the family members subsequently regarding the inheritance. A 1608 document show that Daborne owed £50 to Robert Keysar, one of the managers of the Children of the Queen's Revels. In January 1610 Daborne is listed as one of the patentees (partners or backers) of the Queen's Revels Children when Philip Rosseter re-organized that troupe of boy actors. It is generally assumed that Daborne wrote for that company as a dramatist, and when the troupe linked with the Lady Elizabeth's Men for a time around 1613, Daborne came into the circle of playwrights who worked for impresario Philip Henslowe.

Henslowe's records in the collection of Dulwich College contain more than thirty references to Daborne in letters, receipts, and other documents in the 1613-15 period. Constantly impecunious, like so many of his writing contemporaries, Daborne relied on the self-interested generosity of Henslowe, to whom he was indebted for a series of small loans. He worked on at least five plays for Henslowe in this era, either alone or with collaborators who included Cyril Tourneur, John Fletcher, Nathan Field, and Philip Massinger. None of these plays, with titles like Machiavel and the Devil, The Arraignment of London, and The She Saint, have survived.

Daborne is credited with the authorship of only two extant plays, both of which could be described, in some measure, as swashbucklers:

- A Christian Turn'd Turk (1612) is the tragic story of a pirate who converts to Islam after falling in love with a Muslim girl.
- The Poor Man's Comfort (first published in 1655) is an extraordinary tragicomedy prefiguring aspects of slick urban Restoration comedy, thrusting its protagonist Gisbert into bizarre and violent confrontations.

In the past, academics have argued for Daborne contributions to other plays, such as The Faithful Friends, Rollo Duke of Normandy, Cupid's Revenge, Thierry and Theodoret, and The Honest Man's Fortune; but these attributions are no longer considered likely. (Cyrus Hoy, in his sweeping study of the canon of Fletcher and his collaborators, ruled Daborne out of any participation in the authorship of those works.) Little extra-dramatic literary output by Daborne has survived; he did contribute verse to The Nipping or Snipping of Abuses, a 1614 collection by John Taylor, the Water Poet.

The extant records twice refer to Daborne as a "Master of Arts." He most likely took holy orders by 1618, when he published a sermon. Daborne became chancellor of Waterford in Ireland in 1619, and was made prebendary of Lismore in 1620 and dean of Lismore in 1621. He may have enjoyed the patronage of Lord Willoughby in his clerical career. All of the available evidence suggests that Daborne abandoned drama when he entered the Church.
