= William Lithgow (traveller and author) =

British explorer

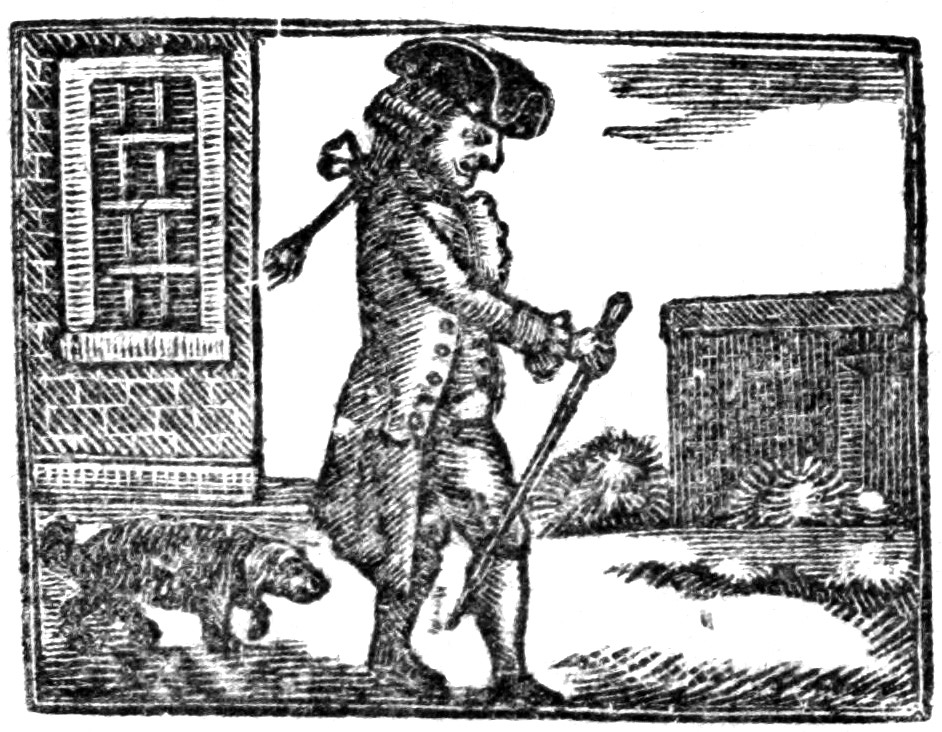
William Lithgow

William Lithgow (c. 1582 – c. 1645) was a Scottish traveller, writer, poet and alleged spy. He claimed at the end of his various peregrinations to have travelled 36,000 miles (58,000 kilometres) on foot.

== Life and adventures ==
William Lithgow was born at Lanark, the oldest son of the merchant James Lithgow and Alison Grahame, his wife. A family tradition had it that William was discovered in the company of a certain Miss Lockhart, and her four brothers cut off his ears, earning him the nickname "lugless Willie".

Prior to 1610 he had visited Shetland, Switzerland, and Bohemia. In that year he set out from Paris for Rome but on his way had allegedly been apprehended by a band of robbers but they took pity on him and gave him money instead. He arrived in Rome on 7 March, where he remained for four weeks before moving on to other parts of Italy: Naples, Ancona, before moving on to Athens, Constantinople. It was on a voyage to Constantinople from Italy that he claimed to have been in a shipwreck and narrowly escaped with his life. Upon reaching Constantinople he is supposedly the first European to sample coffee. After a three-month stay in Constantinople, he sailed to other Greek localities and then on to Palestine, arriving in Jerusalem on Palm Sunday 1612, and later on to Egypt. His next journey, 1614–1616, was in Tunis and Fez; but his last, 1619–1621, to Spain, ended in his apprehension at Malaga and torture under the Spanish Inquisition as a spy. He also visited Crete.

== Bibliography ==
Travels and adventures of Wm. Lithgow

- Rare Adventures and Paineful Peregrinations, an account of his travels
- The Siege of Breda,
- The Siege of Newcastle,
- Poems by William Lithgow.
- A briefe and summarie discourse upon that lamentable and dreadfull disaster at Dunglasse. Anno 1640 (Edinburgh, 1640). A description of the explosion at Dunglass Castle.
- Lithgow, William (1643), "The present surveigh of London and England's state", in Somers, J. Somers (ed.), A collection of scarce and valuable tracts..., vol. 4, pp. 534–545
