= Antonio de Oquendo =

Spanish Navy officer

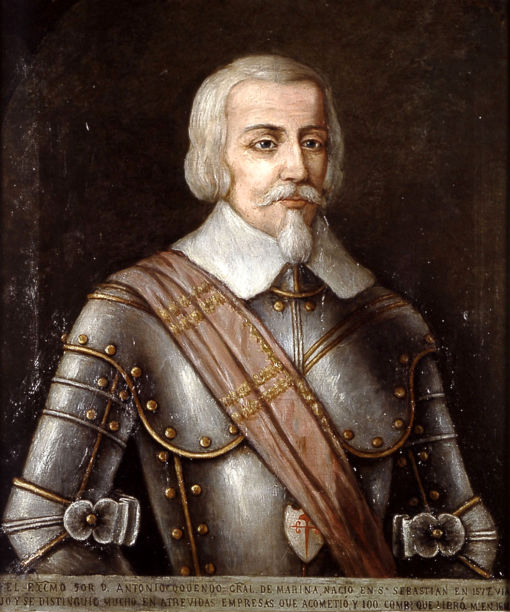
- Born: October 1577; San Sebastián, Guipúzcoa
- Died: 7 June 1640 (aged 62); A Coruña
- Relatives: Miguel de Oquendo (father)
- Military career
- Allegiance: Spain
- Branch: Spanish Navy
- Service years: 1594–1640
- Rank: Captain General
- Conflicts: Anglo-Spanish War (1585–1604); Battle of the Gulf of Cádiz; Eighty Years' War; Battle of St. Kitts (1629); Battle of Albrolhos (1631); Battle of the Downs (1639)

Antonio de Oquendo y Zandategui (October 1577 – 7 June 1640) was a Spanish Navy officer best known for commanding the Spanish fleet which was decisively defeated at the Battle of the Downs in 1639.

== Naval career ==
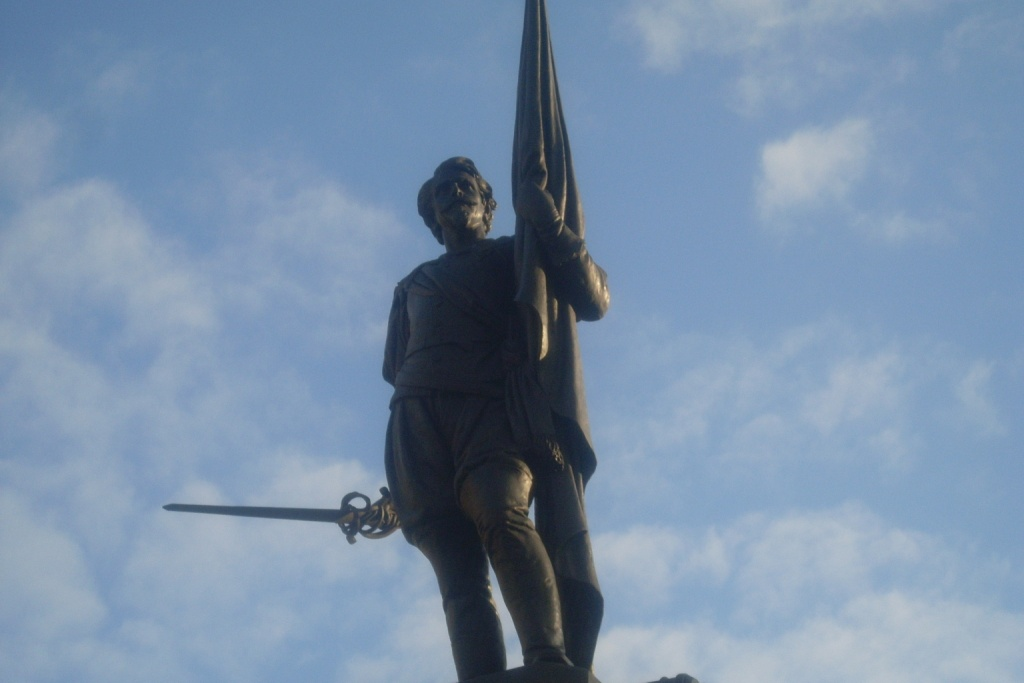
Statue for Antonio de Oquendo, San Sebastián

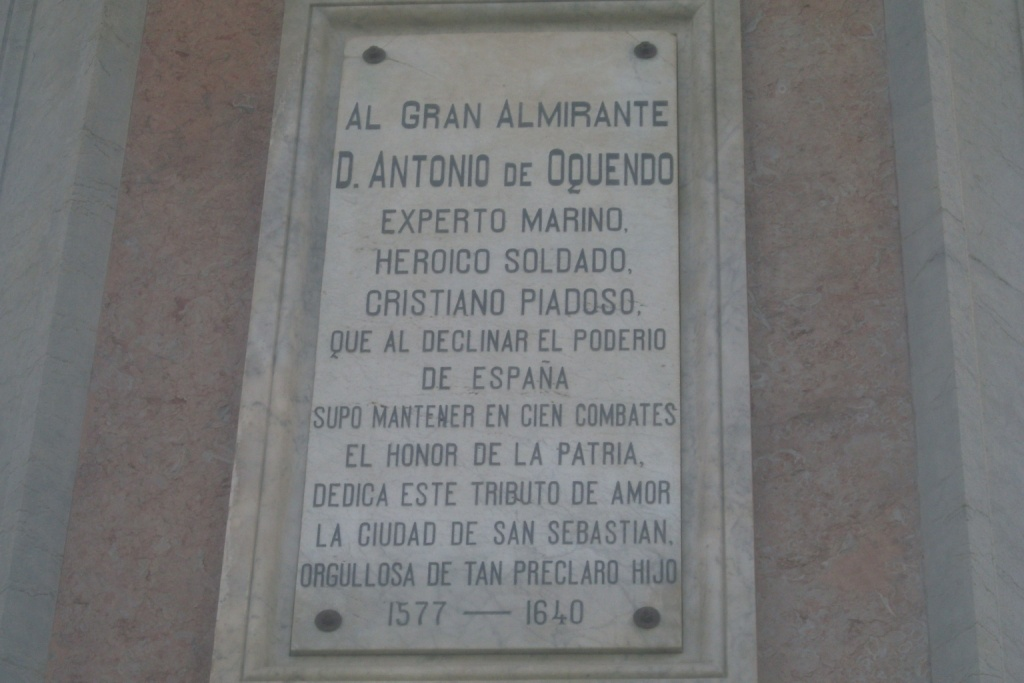
Plaque on base of statue

Antonio was the son of Captain-General Miguel de Oquendo, who died in October 1588 when his ship foundered off Pasajes, while coming back from the ill-fated campaign of the Armada Invencible. In 1594 he entered naval service. He commanded a naval squadron made of his flagship, the Delfín de Escocia, and the Dobladilla, two 500 ton galleons. On 7 August 1604 he captured an English privateer at the Battle of the Gulf of Cádiz. At that time he was serving in the fleet of Admiral Luis Fajardo. In 1607 he was appointed commander of the Biscay squadron, which was that year enlarged and renamed the squadron of the Bay of Biscay. From the same year he also functioned as the General of the Fleet of the Viceroyalty of New Spain.

In 1619 he temporarily replaced Juan Fajardo de Tenza, 1st Marquess of Espinardo, arrested for insubordination, as commander of the Squadron of the Ocean, the Atlantic high seas navy. Ordered to be Fajardo's successor he refused, at the same time trying to make the government aware of the many shortcomings in the naval organisation; as a result he was himself incarcerated. Soon his imprisonment was changed for a forced stay in a convent. After a while Prince Philbert arranged his release; De Oquendo was then given command for a few years of the yearly Spanish treasure fleet, transporting the silver from the Andes to Spain.

In 1624 he was brought to trial on accusations of fraud and nepotism but managed to show that the charges were fabricated by his enemies within the fleet. Nevertheless, he was barred from command of the treasure fleet for four years and condemned to pay an indemnity of 12,000 ducats for having caused the loss of the galleons Espíritu Santo and Santísima Trinidad near Cuba through neglect of duty.

=== Later promotions ===
In 1626 De Oquendo became Admiral-General of the Ocean Fleet, under Captain-General Fadrique de Toledo. In 1628 by his own initiative he relieved La Mámora, at the time besieged by the Moors.

In 1631 he commanded a troop convoy destined for Brazil, to retake the city of Pernambuco, the previous year conquered by the Dutch West India Company. On 12 September he engaged and defeated a Dutch WIC fleet under Admiral Adriaan Pater, allowing him to successfully land the troop contingent. The Spanish lost one vessel, the Dutch three. De Oquendo was now promoted to the highest rank, that of Captain-General.

In 1636 he was arrested for duelling an Italian nobleman in Madrid. In 1637 he refused to reinforce the fleet of the Kingdom of Naples because his squadron was undermanned and poorly supplied. He was punished by being appointed governor of Mahón, the capital of the island of Menorca.

== Role in the Battle of the Downs ==
In 1639, the situation of Spain in the Thirty Years War strongly deteriorated. France had blocked the so called Spanish road via land to the Army of Flanders by the capture of Breisach. Because of this, the Army of Flanders had to resupplied by sea. In August, De Oquendo was made a viscount and given command of a large transport fleet to ship reinforcements from Cádiz to Dunkirk. On 15 September he was intercepted near the Strait of Dover by the squadron of Dutch Lieutenant-Admiral Maarten Tromp, who was reinforced two days later by a flotilla of Vice-Admiral Witte de With.

Though the Dutch force was rather small, consisting of only seventeen vessels, it managed by a clever use of the line-of-battle to severely damage the larger and crowded Spanish ships. De Oquendo feared that if he entered the narrow channel to Dunkirk, he would be trapped in that port, so he opted to take refuge in The Downs, in neutral English waters at the coast of Kent. As Charles I of England had concluded a secret treaty with Spain against the Dutch, De Oquendo hoped to move his troops to Flanders by means of English shipping. On 31 October the Dutch fleet, grown to over a hundred ships, violated English neutrality and attacked the Spanish fleet, succeeding in destroying or capturing many enemy vessels. De Oquendo himself escaped but was heavily wounded and morally broken. He never fully recovered. After his return to Spain he soon died in A Coruña.
