= Jack Ward =

English-Ottoman Barbary pirate (1553–1622)

Jack Ward, later Yusuf Reïs
- Born: John Ward c. 1553; Faversham, Kent, England
- Died: 1622 (aged 68–69); Tunis, Ottoman Tunisia
- Piratical career
- Nickname: Birdy, Sharky, Chakour (also spelled Chagour)
- Type: Barbary Corsair
- Allegiance: Kingdom of England (until 1604); Tunisia (from 1605)
- Years active: fl. 1605–1610
- Rank: Admiral, Reïs
- Base of operations: La Goulette, Tunis
- Commands: Gift, Little John, Reniera e Soderina
- Wealth: £500,000 – £2,000,000

John Ward or Jack Ward (c. 1553 – 1622), or later as Yūsuf Raʾīs Chagour (يُوْسُف رَئِيْس), was an English pirate who later became a Corsair for the Ottoman Empire operating out of Tunis during the early 17th century.

== Biography ==
=== Early life ===
What little is known about Ward's early life comes from a report purportedly written by someone who sailed with him during his pirate days. Ward seems to have been born about 1553, probably in Faversham, Kent, in southeast England. Like many born in coastal areas, he spent his youth and early adult years working in the fisheries. After the failed invasion of England by the Spanish Armada in 1588, Ward found work as a privateer, plundering Spanish ships with a license from Queen Elizabeth I of England. When James I of England ended the war with Spain upon assuming the throne in 1603, many privateers refused to give up their livelihood and simply continued to plunder. Those who did were considered pirates because they no longer had valid licenses – called letters of marque – issued by the state.

Lion's Whelp, 1628

Around 1604, Ward was allegedly pressed into service on a ship sailing under the authority of the King (the Royal Navy had yet to become a formal institution), where he was placed in the Channel Fleet and served aboard a ship named the Lyon's Whelp.

=== Turn to piracy ===
According to Andrew Barker, a captive of Ward's who wrote A True & Accurate Account of the beginning, proceedings, overthrows, and now present estate of Captain Ward and Danseker, Ward was drinking in a Plymouth tavern with thirty of his shipmates. He is alleged to have said:

My mates, quoth he, whats to be done? Here's a scurvy world, and as scurvily we live in't, we feed here upon the water, on the Kings salt beef, without ere a pence to buy us a bissell [bushel of grain] when we come ashore. Revel, supp, and be merry, every one at the proper charge of his own purse. This night, when the Captain and Officers shall conjecture nothing but that we are drawing dry the pot, we'll be diving arm deep in the Fugitives bags.

— Andrew Barker, A True & Certaine Report of Captain Ward

Ward and his colleagues deserted and stole a small 25-ton barque from Portsmouth Harbour. Ward's comrades elected him captain, one of the earliest precedents for pirates choosing their own leader. They sailed to the Isle of Wight and captured another ship, the Violet, a ship rumored to be carrying the treasure of Roman Catholic refugees. The ship turned out to be empty of treasure, but the enterprising Ward used her to capture a much larger French ship.

Ward and his men sailed for the Mediterranean where he was able to acquire a Dutch 32-gun flyboat, which he renamed The Gift. Ward first sailed for Algiers, but several of his men were arrested upon entering the city. Algiers had been attacked by another English mariner, Richard Giffard, only months earlier. They sailed to the Moroccan Atlantic port city Salé, Morocco where in 1605 several English and Dutch sailors, including Richard Bishop and Anthony Johnson, joined Ward's crew.

An Early Modern map of Tunis by Willem Jansz Blaeu

In the summer of 1606, Ward captured a dhow in the Strait of Gibraltar allegedly carrying Catholic slaves. In August 1606 Ward arranged with Uthman Dey to use Tunis as a base of operations. Uthman Bey, or Kara Osman Bey, was the commander of the Janissary corps in Tunis. That garrison supplanted the Pasha of Tunis as the rulers of Tunis in 1598, making Uthman Bey the military dictator of the city. According to their arrangement, Uthman Bey would have first refusal of all goods, up to ten percent of all goods captured.

In early November 1606 Ward captured the English merchantman John Baptist under Captain John Keye. He renamed the merchantman Little John after the English folk hero. From this base, Jack Ward was easily able to capture many ships from several European states. Ward's top lieutenant, William Graves, captured a small English merchantman called the York Bonaventure captained by Andrew Barker. The richest hauls on these early cruises were the valuable Venetian ships Rubi (taken on 16 November 1606) and Carminati (taken on 28 January 1607).

=== The Reniera e Soderina ===
John Ward outfitted Gift, Little John, Rubi, & Carminati for piracy over the late winter and early spring of 1607. His fleet headed for the Adriatic Sea when they were scattered by a terrible storm. Ward, onboard Gift, found only the Rubi before heading for the Eastern Mediterranean. On 26 April 1607, between Cyprus and Turkey, Ward spotted "a great argosy of fourteen or fifteen hundred tons", a Venetian ship named Reniera e Soderina.

Rubi was 400 tons, and Gift only 200 tons, yet the crew elected to attack the Reniera e Soderina. They fought a three-hour firefight, but Reniera e Soderina was too large to maneuver in the light winds, so her guns never scored a hit. Ward's ships managed to pierce her hull five times, lighting bales of hay aflame inside. Finally, Ward ordered his ships to close and prepare to board.

The crew of Reniera e Soderina voted to fight and repel the boarding party, and the captain handed out small arms. However, a well-timed volley of chain shot from Rubi hit at least two defenders, tearing them apart. The carpenter aboard Reniera e Soderina confronted his captain, telling him to surrender or face a mutiny. The captain consented, and Ward captured Reniera e Soderina with no further fighting. According to Andrew Barker her cargo was "esteemed to be worth two millions in the least."

The English government didn't concur. They estimated the cargo to be worth only £500,000. Still, a report from the Venetian Ambassador in London told the privy council that Venice was close to declaring war on England due to Ward's piracy. That ambassador, Secretary Esposizioni, wrote:

That famous pirate, Ward, so well-known in this port for the damage he has done, is beyond a doubt the greatest scoundrel that ever sailed from England. He has refitted a Venetian ship Soderina and turned her into a berton, with forty pieces of bronze artillery on the lower, and twenty on the upper deck. He has given his old ship to Captain [Graves] and these two and some other four ships form six fighting ships in all.

The English Ambassador in Venice assured the Council "As to Ward, who captured the Soderina and transformed her into a berton, he will meet with a warm reception if he comes into these waters."

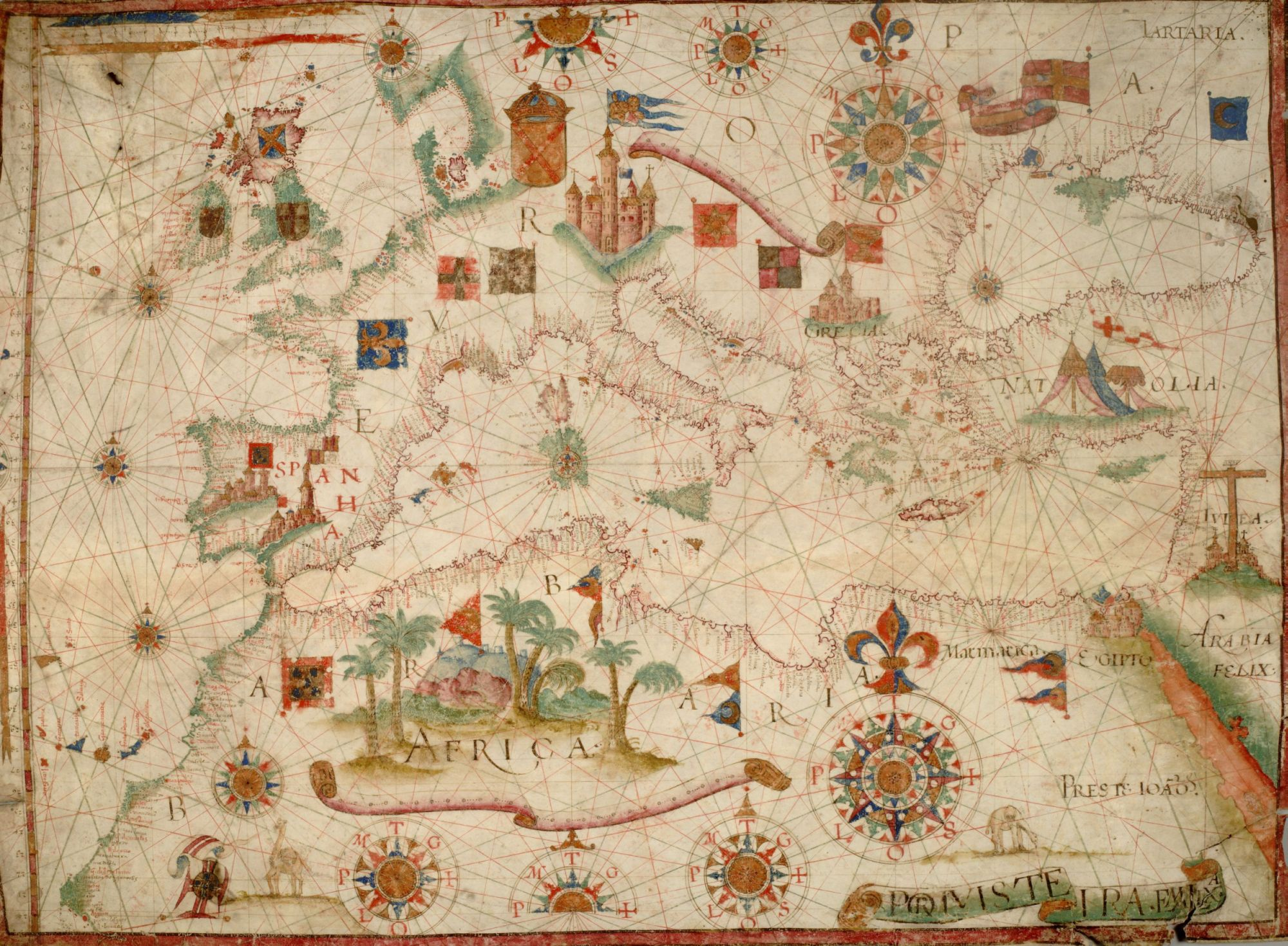
Nautical Chart of the Mediterranean Sea (1600)

=== Conversion to Islam ===
Following his return to Tunis in June 1607, Ward outfitted Reniera e Soderina into a powerful Man-o-War. The crew cut at least 20 new gun ports into her hull to accommodate all 60 brass guns. He set out to sail in early 1608. Then, in March, a ship spotted wreckage of a ship off the coast of Greece, and rumors began to spread that it was Reniera e Soderina and John Ward was dead.

Ward asked James I of England for a royal pardon which was refused, due to a threat of war from Venice, as Ward had attacked many Venetian ships, and he reluctantly returned to Tunis. Uthman Dey, an Ottoman officer of Tunis, kept his word and granted him protection. He converted to Islam along with his entire crew and changed his name to Yusuf Reis, with a nickname of Chakour or Chagour, because he used an axe in his piracy acts. He used the city of Aquilaria (El Haouaria) as an acting port, and married an Italian woman while continuing to send money to his English wife. In 1612 a play called A Christian Turn'd Turk was written about his conversion by the English dramatist Robert Daborne.

It is doubtful that English converts to Islam in Tunis had to follow the religion strictly: French traveller Laurent d'Arvieux visited the city later that century, and made note of its liberal attitude to religion.

=== Later years ===
An English sailor who saw him in Tunis in 1608 described Ward to the Venetian authorities as "very short, with little hair, and that quite white; bald in front; swarthy face and beard. Speaks little, and almost always swearing. Drunk from morn till night...The habits of a thorough salt. A fool and an idiot out of his trade."

During the next few years ballads and pamphleteers condemned John Ward for turning corsair.

Ward continued raiding Mediterranean shipping, eventually commanding a whole fleet of corsairs, whose flagship was a Venetian sixty-gunner. After 1612 he ended his career in piracy, electing to teach younger corsairs gunnery and navigation. He profited greatly by his piracy, retiring to Tunis to live a life of opulent comfort until his death in 1622, at the age of 68 or 69, possibly from the plague.

== Legacy ==
From 1609 until 1615 dozens of plays, ballads, memoirs, pamphlets, and books would be written about England's Arch-Pirate. The most prominent include A Christian Turn'd Turk by Robert Daborne, Nevves from Sea, Of two notorious Pyrats Ward the Englishman and Danseker the Dutchman, Captain Ward and the Rainbow, and A True and Certain Report of the Beginning, Proceedings, Overthrows, and Now Present Estate of Captain Ward and Danseker, the Two Late Famous Pirates from their First Setting forth to this Present Time by Andrew Barker.

It has been suggested that his nickname was "Sharkey" and was the origin of this nickname, now given to anyone in the Royal Navy with the surname "Ward".

To his contemporaries, Ward was an enigmatic figure, in some ways like a Robin Hood, but in the 16th and 17th centuries, many English pirates operated out of the mouth of the Sebou River and preyed on Mediterranean shipping. Ward was supposed to have spared English ships while attacking "papist" vessels. John Ward and Simon Danseker are credited with introducing Barbary corsairs to the use of square-rigged ships of northern Europe.

The ballad "Captain Ward and the Rainbow" is very likely based on Jack Ward.

A fictionalized account of Ward's career appears in Thomas Costain's historical novel For My Great Folly, which was published in 1942.

In the 2010s, various Turkish newspapers and websites popularised an unverified hypothesis put forth in the monthly Derin Tarih that John Ward could be the inspiration for the character Jack Sparrow from the film series Pirates of the Caribbean. The BBC History Magazine also presented John Ward as an inspiration for the character.
