= Henry Mainwaring =

English naval officer, lawyer, and pirate (1587–1653)

Sir Henry Mainwaring
- Born: 1586/7; Ightfield, Shropshire, England
- Died: 1653; France
- Piratical career
- Nickname: The Dread Pirate
- Type: Privateer
- Allegiance: England
- Years active: 1610–1639
- Rank: Captain
- Base of operations: Newfoundland; Gibraltar; La Mamora
- Commands: HMS Resistance
- Later work: Royal Navy vice-admiral and author

Sir Henry Mainwaring (1587–1653), was an English lawyer, soldier, writer, seaman and politician who sat in the House of Commons from 1621 to 1622. He was for a time a pirate based in Newfoundland and then a naval officer with the Royal Navy. He supported the Royalist cause in the English Civil War.

== Early life ==
Mainwaring was born in Ightfield, Shropshire, second son of Sir George Mainwaring and his wife Ann, the daughter of Sir William More of Loseley Park in Surrey. His maternal grandfather was Sir William More, Vice-Admiral of Sussex. He graduated from Brasenose College at the University of Oxford, where he was awarded a B.A. in Law, at the age of 15, in 1602. He then served as trial lawyer (admitted in 1604 as a student at Inner Temple), soldier (possibly in the Low Countries), sailor, and author (pupil of John Davies of Hereford) before turning to piracy.

== From pirate-hunter to pirate ==
In 1610, at the age of 24, Mainwaring was given a commission from Lord High Admiral Nottingham to capture the notorious Newfoundland "arch-pirate" Peter Easton, then feared to be hovering around the Bristol Channel. This may have been just a convenient excuse for the well-armed Resistance, his small but speedy ship, to become a scourge to the Spanish.

On reaching the Straits of Gibraltar, Mainwaring announced to his crew his intention of fighting the Spanish anywhere he found them. Turning to piracy was not that out of line for the young valiant in those years.

In 1614 he sailed his fleet to Newfoundland, saying that the region was the best in which to recruit a pirate crew and reprovision his ships. Mainwaring used Easton's old base at Harbour Grace, Canada, as his pirate base and raided Spanish, Portuguese, and French ships.

On 4 June 1614, off the coast of Newfoundland, Mainwaring, in command of eight vessels, plundered the cod-fishing fleet, stealing provisions and taking away with him carpenters and mariners. In taking seamen, Mainwaring would pick one out of every six. In all, 400 men joined him willingly, while others were perforstmen. Sailing to the coast of Spain, Mainwaring then took a Portuguese ship and plundered her cargo of wine, and he later took a French prize and stole 10,000 dried fish from her hold.

When Mainwaring was away from his main base at La Mamora, on the Atlantic coast of present-day Morocco, a Spanish fleet under Admiral Luis Fajardo, sailing from Cádiz on 1 August 1614, conquered the town. Mainwaring's relations with the Moors were such that he was able to secure the release of their English prisoners.

So feared was his pirate fleet that Spain offered Mainwaring a pardon and high command in return for his services under the Spanish flag.

Such actions earned Mainwaring a reputation as a formidable seaman. According to the Venetian ambassador, Piero Contarini:

He was unsurpassed in nautical skill for fighting his ship, for his mode of boarding and resisting the enemy...For nautical experience and for sea-fights, and for a multitude of daring feats performed afloat, he is in high repute, being considered resolute and courageous and perfectly suited to that profession, understanding the managing of first-rates better perhaps than anyone.

== Pardon and service in the Royal Navy ==
When his pirate activities almost broke the tenuous peace between England, Spain and Portugal, King James I threatened to send a fleet after Mainwaring, to whom he later granted a royal pardon in 1616 for having saved the Newfoundland trading fleet near Gibraltar.

Mainwaring wrote a book on piracy (Discourse of Pirates, on the suppression of piracy, 1618), the manuscript of which is in the British Museum. In his book, he explains what causes a desperate man to turn to piracy. He also advises the King against granting pardons to pirates. The King promptly dispatched Mainwaring to the Venetian Republic as his representative, over the protests of the Spanish ambassador.

Mainwaring was knighted at Woking on 20 March 1618. He was commissioned in the Royal Navy. In 1621, he was elected Member of Parliament from Dover.

Mainwaring compiled a detailed dictionary of nautical terms in the 1620s that was published in London in 1644 as The Sea-Man's Dictionary.

Mainwaring became vice-admiral before leaving the navy in 1639. As a Royalist, he served in the King's cause in the English Civil War, was exiled to France, and died in poverty. He was buried at St. Giles' Church, Camberwell, London, on 15 May 1653.

== Family ==
Mainwaring married a daughter of Sir Thomas Gardiner in 1630. She died in 1633. His brothers were Sir Arthur Mainwaring, Carver to Prince Henry, George Mainwaring, the defender of Tong Castle, and Sir Thomas Mainwaring, the Recorder of Reading. The Mainwaring family was old and distinguished, probably having arrived in England in the reign of William the Conqueror (1066).

Parliament of England
Preceded by Sir George Fane; Sir Robert Brett	Member of Parliament for Dover; 1621–1622; With: Sir Richard Young	Succeeded by Sir Edward Cecil; Sir Richard Young
