= Protestantism and Islam =

During the early modern period, Muslim and European Protestant leaders and states often made diplomatic and commercial contacts, including occasional military alliances and collaboration. At this time the two groups shared an enemy in the Catholic Habsburg empire which sought to eliminate what they considered to be an emerging Protestant heresy and to drive out the greatly expanding Muslim Ottoman Empire from Europe. The Protestants appreciated the Ottoman's tradition of tolerance for other religions -- including their accepting of Protestant refugees fleeing Catholic rule. The Ottomans saw the religious division of European as an opportunity to expand their empire.

The threat of the Ottoman Empire to the (Catholic) Charles V, Holy Roman Emperor contributed to the "consolidation, expansion and legitimization of Lutheranism" more than "any other single factor", according to Jack Goody. But there were other alliances, agreements or attempts at such, included between Morocco and the Low Countries against Catholic Spain, England and the Barbary states, Persian Shah Abbas and the East India Company.

The two religious groups shared some religious differences with Catholicism -- not considering marriage a sacrament, rejecting monastic orders, and the banning images in places of worship -- and would sometimes highlighted these issues in their communications with each other seeking to establish religious common ground.

Cooperation between Christian and Muslim powers was not limited to Protestant entities. The alliance between the Catholic Kingdom of France and the Ottomans lasted to French invasion of Egypt in 1798 and the Habsburgs sought to forge an alliance with Safavid Iran to counteract it. As vassals of the Holy Roman Empire, Protestant Imperial Estates participated in Reichskriege against the Ottoman Empire.

== Historical background ==
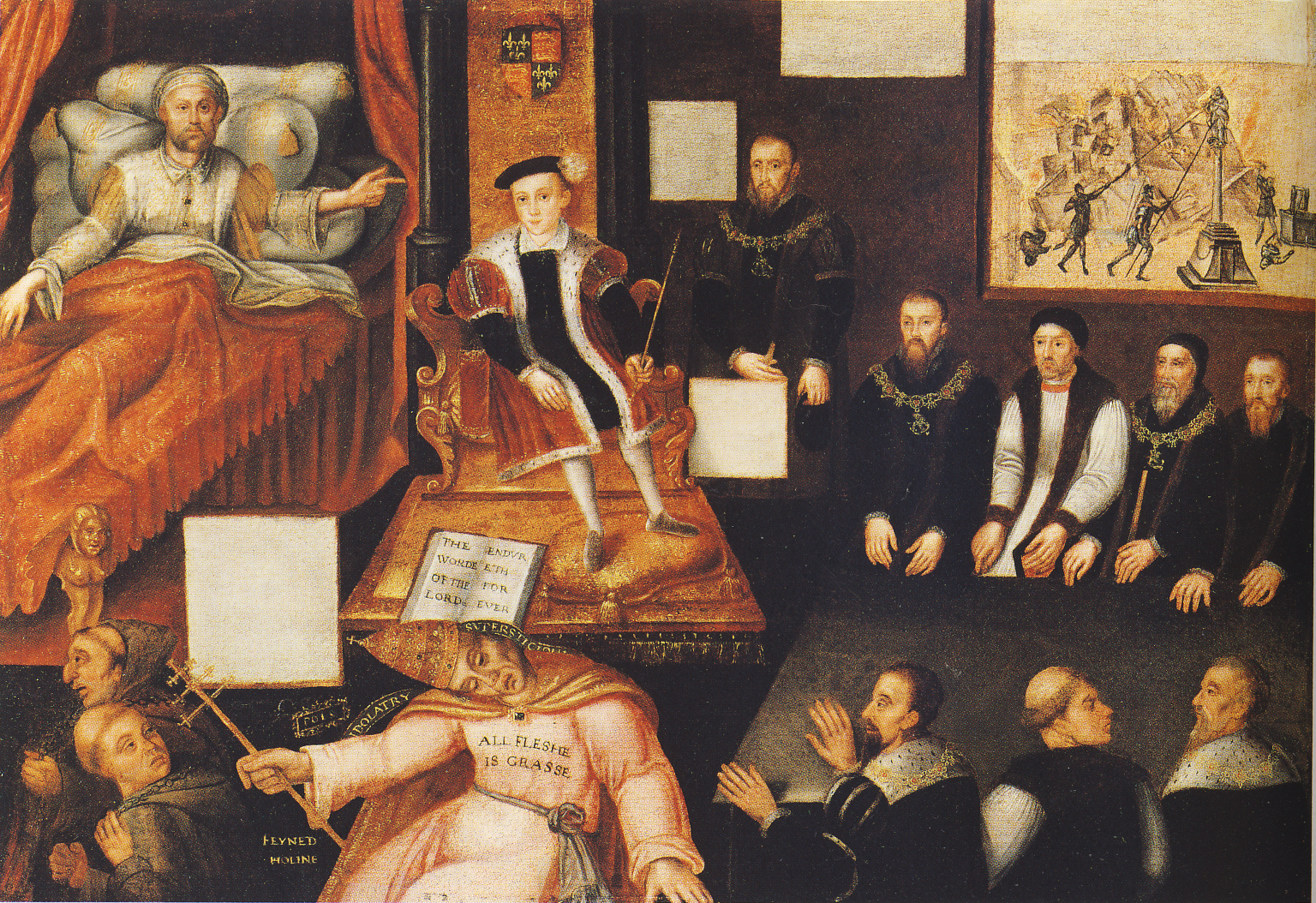
Anti-Papal painting showing the enmity between Edward VI of England and the Pope.

Following the Ottoman conquest of Constantinople in 1453 by Mehmed the Conqueror and the unification of the Middle East under Selim I and his son Suleiman the Magnificent managed to expand Ottoman rule into Central Europe. The Habsburg Empire thus entered into direct conflict with the Ottomans.

At the same time the Protestant Reformation was taking place in numerous areas of northern and central Europe, in harsh opposition to Papal authority and the Holy Roman Empire led by Emperor Charles V. This situation led the Protestants to consider various forms of cooperation and rapprochement (religious, commercial, military) with the Muslim world, in opposition to their common Habsburg enemy.

The Ottoman Empire shared a boundary with Christian Europe to the southeast, engaging into contact with Calvinist, Lutheran and Unitarian minorities. This map shows the spread of Protestantism in the 16th and 17th centuries, superimposed on modern borders.

== Early religious accommodation (15th–17th centuries) ==
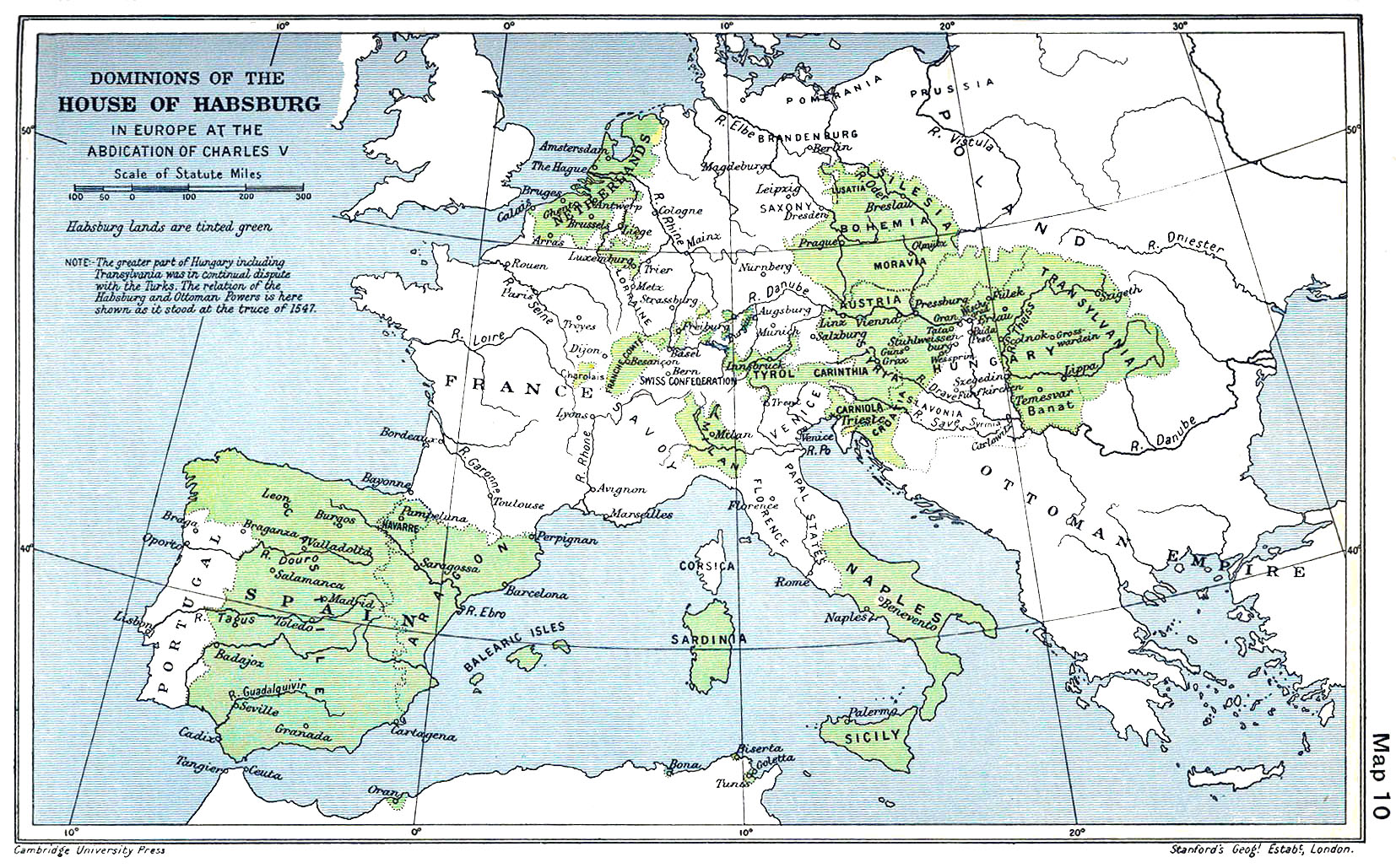
A map of the dominion of the Habsburgs following the Battle of Mühlberg (1547) as depicted in The Cambridge Modern History Atlas (1912); Habsburg lands are shaded green. Not shaded are the lands of the Holy Roman Empire over which the Habsburgs presided.

During the development of the Reformation, similarities between Protestantism and Islam were noted: "Islam was seen as closer to Protestantism in banning images from places of worship, in not treating marriage as a sacrament and in rejecting monastic orders". The dispute between Catholics and Protestants in a divided Europe opened the way for Islam on the field of battle.

=== Mutual tolerance ===
During the Reformation, the Sultan of the Ottoman Empire was known for his tolerance of the Christian and Jewish faiths within his dominions, whereas the King of Spain did not tolerate the Protestant faith. Various religious refugees, such as the Huguenots, some Anglicans, Quakers, Anabaptists or even Jesuits or Capuchins were able to find refuge at Istanbul and in the Ottoman Empire, where they were given right of residence and worship. Further, the Ottomans supported the Calvinists in Transylvania and Hungary but also in France. The contemporary French thinker Jean Bodin wrote:

The great emperor of the Turks does with as great devotion as any prince in the world honour and observe the religion by him received from his ancestors, and yet detests he not the strange religions of others; but on the contrary permits every man to live according to his conscience: yes, and that more is, near unto his palace at Pera, suffers four diverse religions viz. that of the Jews, that of the Christians, that of the Grecians, and that of the Mahometans.

— Jean Bodin.

==== Comments of Martin Luther ====
Martin Luther regarded the Ottomans as the instrument of "God's wrath against Europe's sins", but opposed that empire's religion as "false". In his 1528 pamphlet, On War against the Turk, he criticized the principles of Islam as "utterly despicable and blasphemous" and called on Germans to resist the Ottoman invasion of Europe, as the catastrophic Siege of Vienna was lurking, stating "[b]ut as the pope is Antichrist, so the Turk is the very devil". Concerning the Islamic holy book, Luther promised he would translate the Quran into German, "when I have time ... so that every man may see what a foul and shameful book it is". His knowledge on the subject was based on a medieval polemicist version of the Qu'ran made by Riccoldo da Monte di Croce, which was the European scholarly reference of the subject. In 1542, while Luther was translating Riccoldo's Refutation of the Koran, which would become the first version of Koranic material in German, he wrote a letter to Basle's city council to relieve the ban on Theodore Bibliander's translation of the Qu'ran into Latin. Mostly due to his letter, Bibliander's translation was finally allowed and eventually published in 1543, with a preface made by Martin Luther himself. With access to a more accurate translation of the Qu'ran, Luther understood some of Riccoldo's critiques to be partial, but nevertheless concurred with virtually all of them.

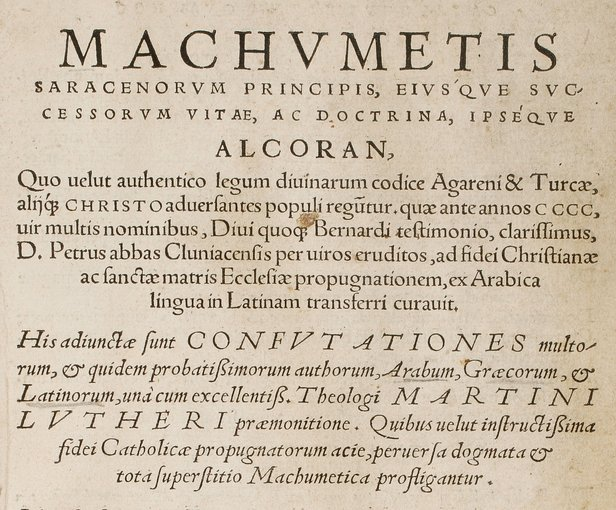
Preface of Martin Luther of Bibliander's translation of the Qu'ran in Latin.

However, Luther felt a sense of tolerance should be given to Islam as to other faiths of its time:

Let the Turk believe and live as he will, just as one lets the papacy and other false Christians live.

— Excerpt from On war against the Turk, 1529.

(However, it is not clear whether the meaning was of "Turks" in this statement was to the rule of the Ottoman Empire, or Islam in general.)

Luther's tolerance also appears in another comment, in which he said that "A smart Turk makes a better ruler than a dumb Christian".

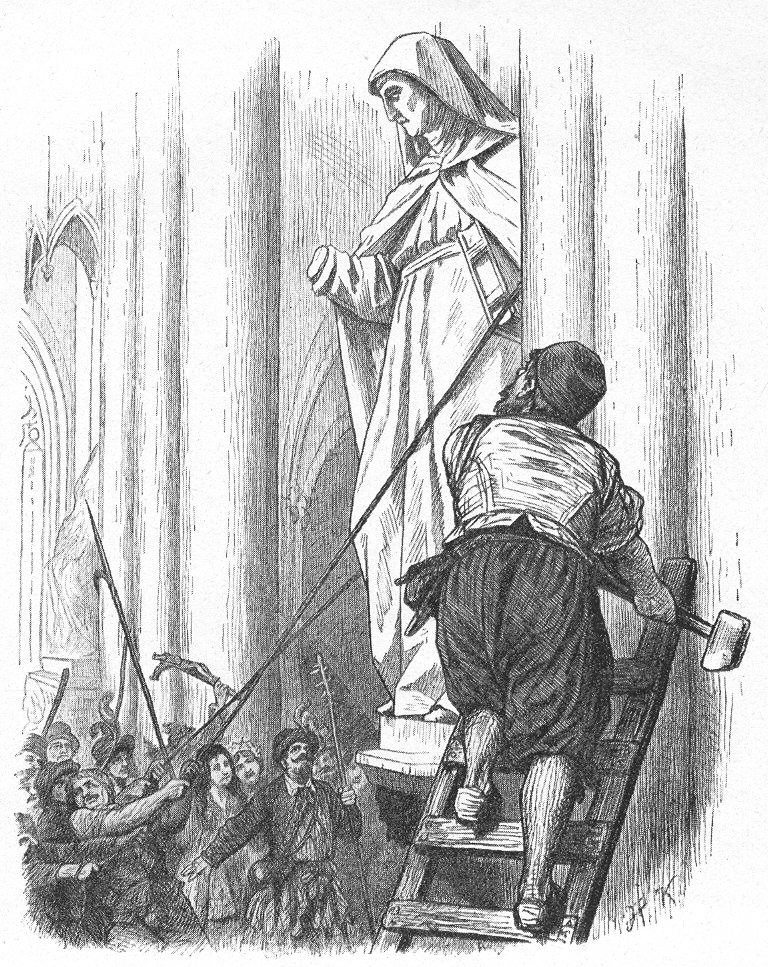
Protestant iconoclasm: the Beeldenstorm during the Dutch reformation.

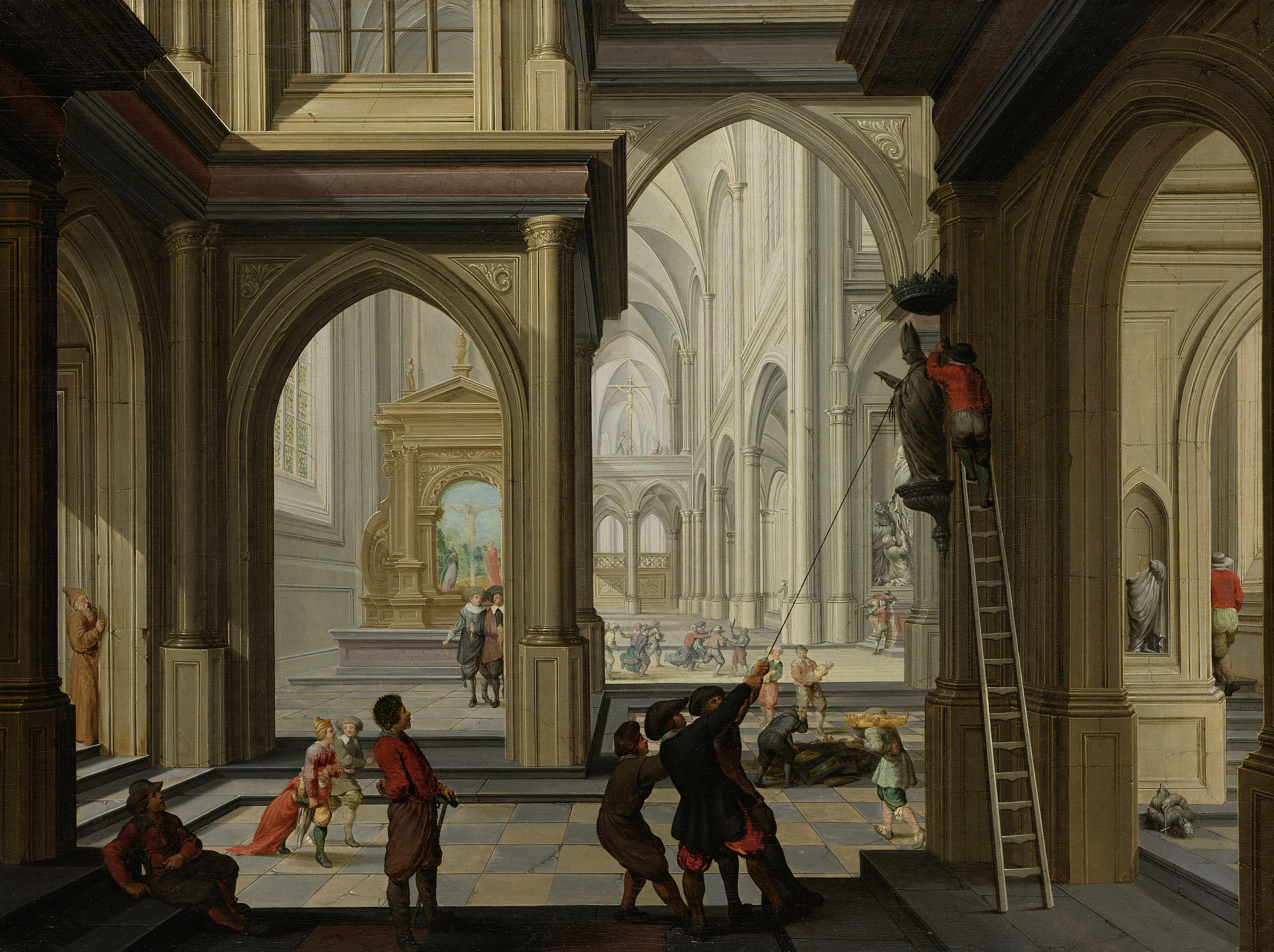
Iconoclasm: The organised destruction of Catholic images swept through Netherlands churches in 1566.

Luther noted that some Christians who were favourable to the Ottoman Empire, and "who actually want the Turk to come and rule, because they think that our German people are wild and uncivilized - indeed that they are half-devil and half-man".

==== Ottoman attempts to claim similarity ====
On a number of occasions Ottoman sultans professed their beliefs (correctly or not) to be closer to the Protestants than to the Catholics.

A letter was sent from Suleiman the Magnificent to the "Lutherans" in Flanders, claiming that he felt close to them, "since they did not worship idols, believed in one God and fought against the Pope and Emperor".

This notion of religious similarities was again taken up in epistolary exchanges between Elizabeth I of England and Sultan Murad III. In one correspondence, Murad entertained the notion that Islam and Protestantism had "much more in common than either did with Roman Catholicism, as both rejected the worship of idols", and argued for an alliance between England and the Ottoman Empire.

In a 1574 letter to the "Members of the Lutheran sect in Flanders and Spain", Murad III made considerable efforts to highlight the similarities between Islamic and Protestants principles. He wrote:

As you, for your part, do not worship idols, you have banished the idols and portraits and "bells" from churches, and declared your faith by stating that God Almighty is one and Holy Jesus is His Prophet and Servant, and now, with heart and soul, are seeking and desirous of the true faith; but the faithless one they call Papa does not recognize his Creator as One, ascribing divinity to Holy Jesus (upon him be peace!), and worshiping idols and pictures which he has made with his own hands, thus casting doubt upon the oneness of God and instigating how many servants to that path of error.

— 1574 letter of Murad III to the "Members of the Lutheran sect in Flanders and Spain".

Such claims seem to have been politically inspired as well, with the Ottomans trying to establish religious common ground as a way to secure a political alliance. Elizabeth I herself however made efforts to adjust her own religious rhetoric in order to minimize differences with the Ottomans and facilitate relations. In her correspondence with Murad, she stresses the monotheism and the anti-idolatry of her religion, by uniquely describing herself as:

Elizabeth, by the grace of the most mighty God, the three part and yet singular Creator of Heaven and Earth, Queen of England, France and Ireland, the most invincible and most mighty defender of the Christian faith against all the idolatry of those unworthy ones that live amongst Christians, and falsely profess the name of Christ

— Letter of Elizabeth I to Murad III.

== Military collaboration ==
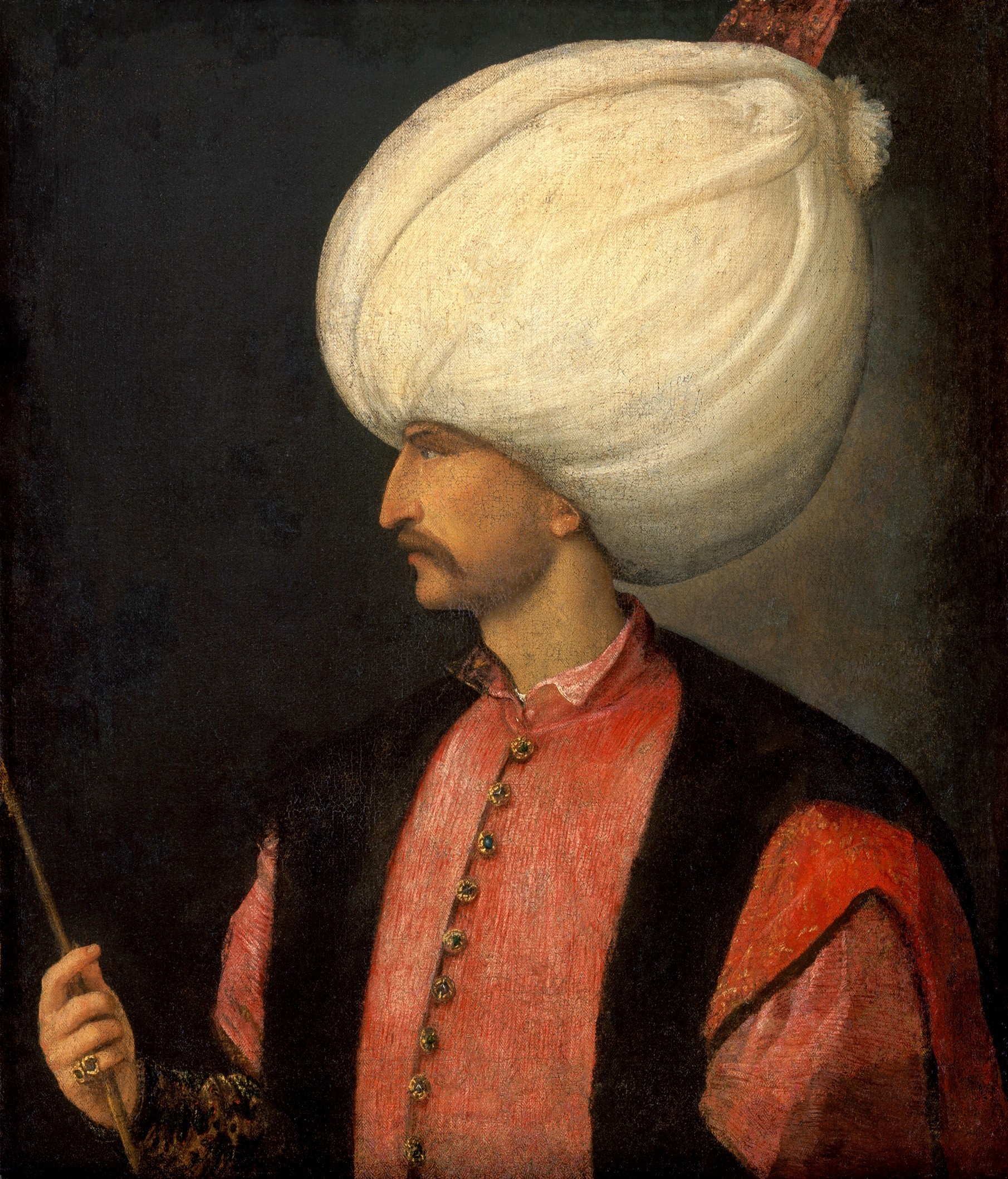
Suleiman the Magnificent offered military support to the "Lutherans" of Flanders.

Protestantism and Islam entered into contact during the 16th century when Calvinist Protestants in present-day Hungary and Transylvania coincided with the expansion of the Ottoman Empire in the Balkans.

=== Franco-Ottoman alliance and Protestantism ===
Military cooperation between the Ottoman Empire and European powers started in earnest with the Franco-Ottoman alliance of 1535. The alliance provided strategic support to, and effectively protected, the kingdom of France from the ambitions of Charles V. It also gave the opportunity for the Ottoman Empire to become involved in European diplomacy and gain prestige in its European dominions. Side effects included a lot of negative propaganda against the actions of France and its "unholy" alliance with a Muslim power. According to historian Arthur Hassall the consequences of the Franco-Ottoman alliance were far-reaching: "The Ottoman alliance had powerfully contributed to save France from the grasp of Charles V, it had certainly aided Protestantism in Germany, and from a French point of view, it had rescued the North German allies of Francis I."

Protestant states were excluded from the Holy League in 1571 and no intention of joining it. Even after the 1571 Battle of Lepanto, Ottoman support for France would continue however, as well as support for the Dutch and the English after 1580, and support for Protestants and Calvinists, as a way to counter Habsburg attempts at supremacy in Europe. Various overtures were made by Ottoman rulers to the Protestants, who were also fighting against a common enemy, the Catholic House of Habsburg. Suleiman the Magnificent is known to have sent at least one letter to the "Lutherans" in Flanders, offering troops at the time they would request, Murad III is also known to have advocated to Elizabeth I an alliance between England and the Ottoman Empire.

The allegiances of the Ottoman Empire and threat of Ottoman expansion in Eastern Europe pressured King Charles V to sign the Peace of Nuremberg (1532) with the Protestant princes, accept the Peace of Passau (1552), and the Peace of Augsburg (1555), formally recognizing Protestantism in Germany and ending military threats to their existence. Overall, the military activism of the Ottoman Empire on the southern European front probably was the reason why Lutheranism was able to survive in spite of the opposition of Charles V and reach recognition at the Peace of Augsburg in September 1555: "the consolidation, expansion and legitimization of Lutheranism in Germany by 1555 should be attributed to Ottoman imperialism more than to any other single factor". The Protestant Electorates of Brandenburg, Hanover and Saxony send troops in support of the Holy Roman Empire in the Great Turkish War (1683–1699).

=== The Dutch Revolt and Islam ===
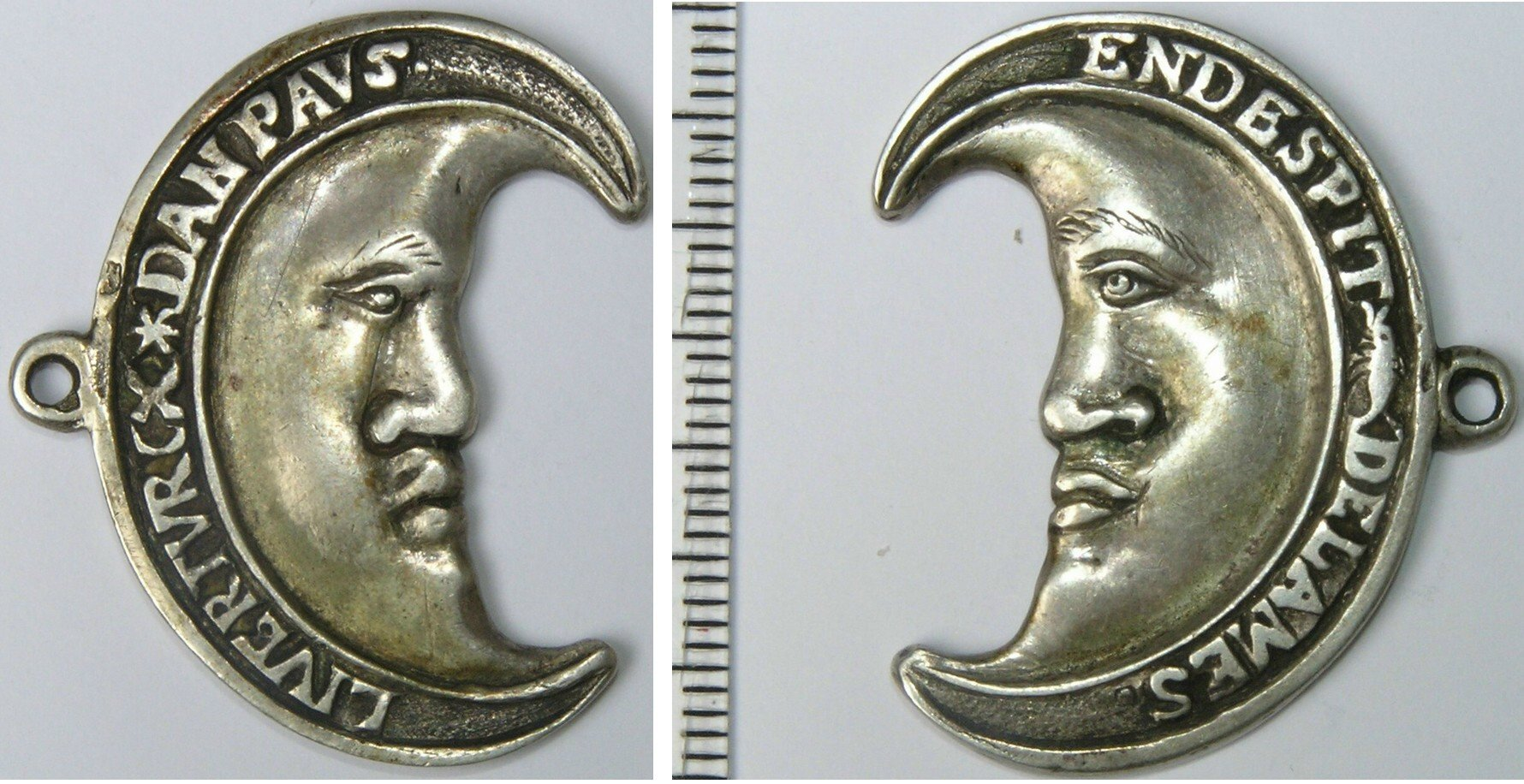
A Dutch crescent-shaped Geuzen medal at the time of the anti-Spanish Dutch Revolt, with the slogan "Liver Turcx dan Paus" ("Rather Turkish than Pope (i.e. Papist)"), 1570.

Fundamentally, the Protestant Dutch had strong antagonisms to both the Catholics and the Muslims. In some cases however, alliances, or attempts at alliance between the Dutch and the Muslims were made possible, as when the Dutch allied with the Muslims of the Moluccas to oust the Portuguese, and the Dutch became rather tolerant of the Islamic religion in their colonial possessions after the final subjugation of Macassar in 1699.

The Dutch looked expectantly at the development of the Siege of Malta (1565), hoping that the Ottomans "were in Valladolid already". They saw Ottoman successes against the Habsburgs with great interest, and saw Ottoman campaigns in the Mediterranean as a way to obtain concessions from the Spanish crown. William of Orange wrote around 1565:

The Turks are very threatening, which will mean, we believe, that the king will not come to the Netherlands this year.

— Letter of William of Orange to his brother, circa 1565.

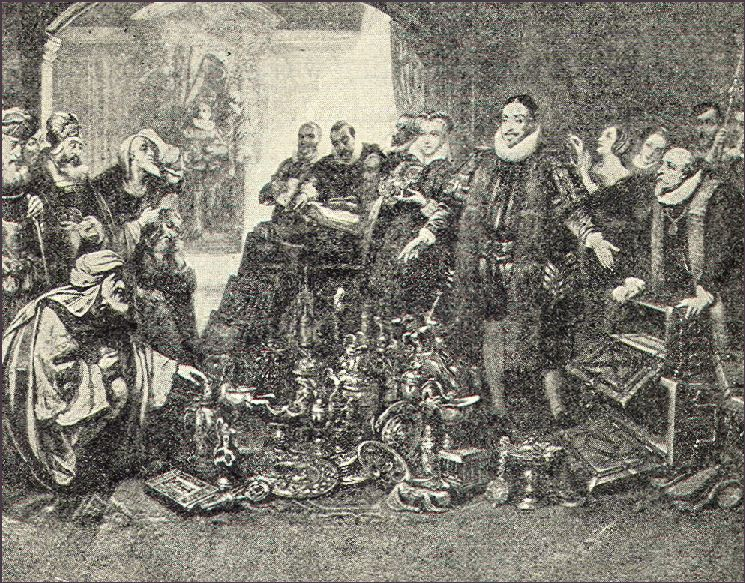
"William of Orange pledges his jewels for the defence of his country".

Contacts soon became more direct. During the Dutch Revolt in 1566, the Dutch were under such a desperate situation that they looked for help from every nationality, and "indeed even a Turk", as wrote the secretary of Jan van Nassau. William sent ambassadors to the Ottoman Empire for help in 1566. When no other European power would help, "the Dutch cause was offered active support, paradoxically enough, only by the Ottoman Turks". One of the Sultan principal advisers Joseph Miques, Duke of Naxos, delivered a letter to the Calvinists in Antwerp pledging that "the forces of the Ottomans would soon hit Philip II's affairs so hard that he would not even have the time to think of Flanders". The death of Suleiman the Magnificent later into the year, however, meant that the Ottoman were unable to offer support for several years after. In 1568, William of Orange again sent a request to the Ottomans to attack Spain, without success. The 1566-1568 revolt of the Netherlands finally failed, largely due to the lack of foreign support.

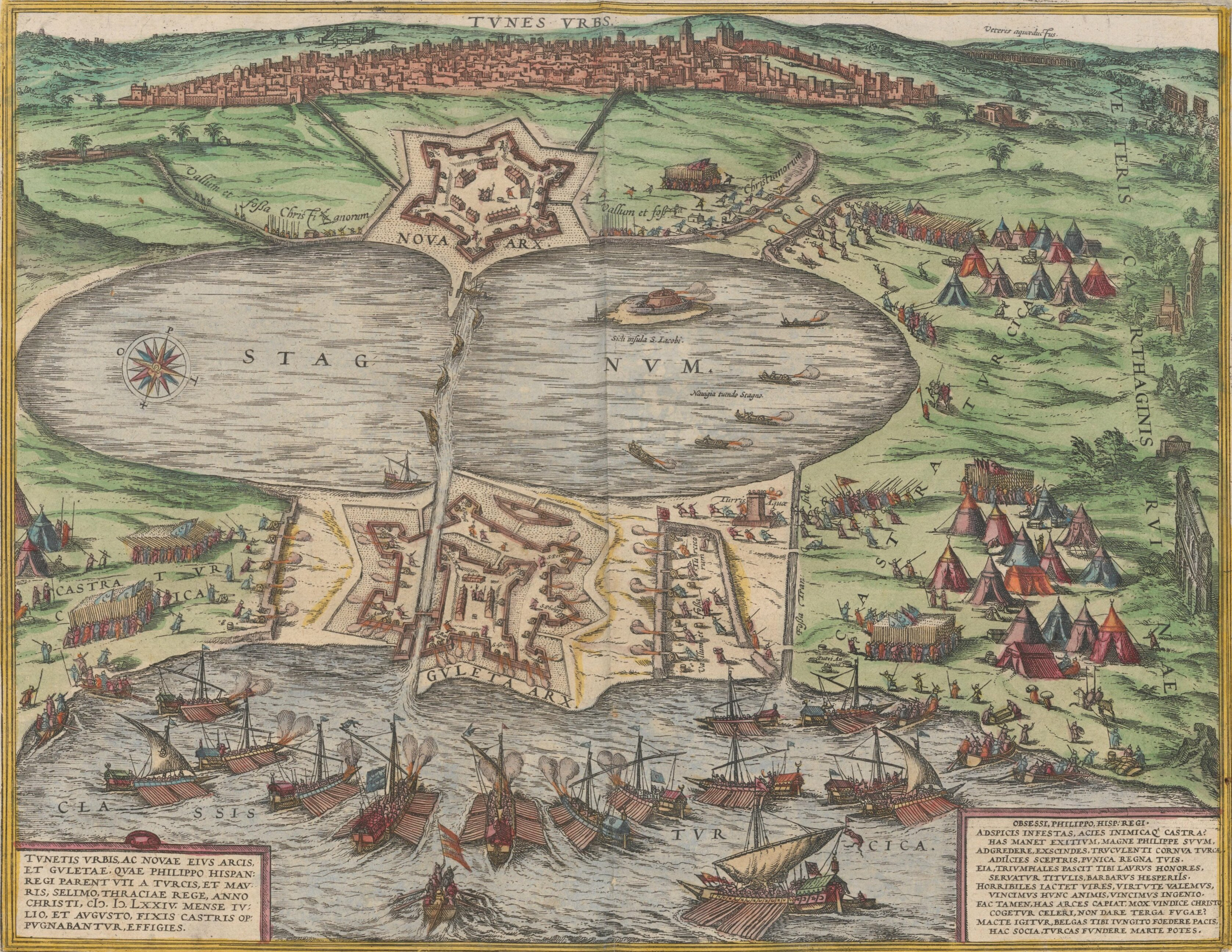
The Ottoman fleet in the Capture of Tunis in 1574.

In 1574, William of Orange and Charles IX of France, through his pro-Huguenot ambassador François de Noailles, Bishop of Dax, tried again to obtain the support of the Ottoman ruler Selim II. Selim II sent his support through a messenger, who endeavoured to put the Dutch in contact with the rebellious Moriscos of Spain and the pirates of Algiers. Selim also sent a great fleet which conquered Tunis in October 1574, thus succeeding in reducing Spanish pressure on the Dutch, and leading to negotiations at the Conference of Breda. After the death of Charles IX in May 1574 however, contacts weakened, although the Ottomans are said to have supported the 1575-1576 revolt, and establish a Consulate in Antwerp (De Griekse Natie). The Ottomans made a truce with Spain, and shifted their attention to their conflict with Persia, starting the long Ottoman–Safavid War (1578–1590).

The British author William Rainolds (1544–1594) wrote a pamphlet entitled "Calvino-Turcismus" in criticism of these rapprochements.

The phrase Liever Turks dan Paaps ("Rather a Turk than a Papist") was a Dutch slogan during the Dutch Revolt of the end of the 16th century. The slogan was used by the Dutch mercenary naval forces (the "Sea Beggars") in their fight against Catholic Spain. The banner of the Sea Beggars was also similar to that of the Turks, with a crescent on a red background. The phrase "Liever Turks dan Paaps" was coined as a way to express that life under the Ottoman Sultan would have been more desirable than life under the King of Spain. The Flemish noble D'Esquerdes wrote to this effect that he:

would rather become a tributary to the Turks than live against his conscience and be treated according to those [anti-heresy] edicts.

— Letter of Flemish noble D'Esquerdes.

During the early 17th century the Dutch trading ports housed many Muslims, according to a Dutch traveler to Persia there would be no use in describing the Persians as "they are so numerous in Dutch cities". Dutch paintings from that time often show Turks, Persians and Jews strolling through the city. Officials that were sent to the Netherlands included Zeyn-Al-Din Beg of the Saffavid empire in 1607 and Ömer Aga of the Ottoman Empire in 1614. Like the Venetians en Genoese before them, the Dutch and English established a trade network in the eastern Mediterranean and had regular interactions with the ports of the Persian Gulf. Many Dutch painters even went to work in Isfahan, central Iran.

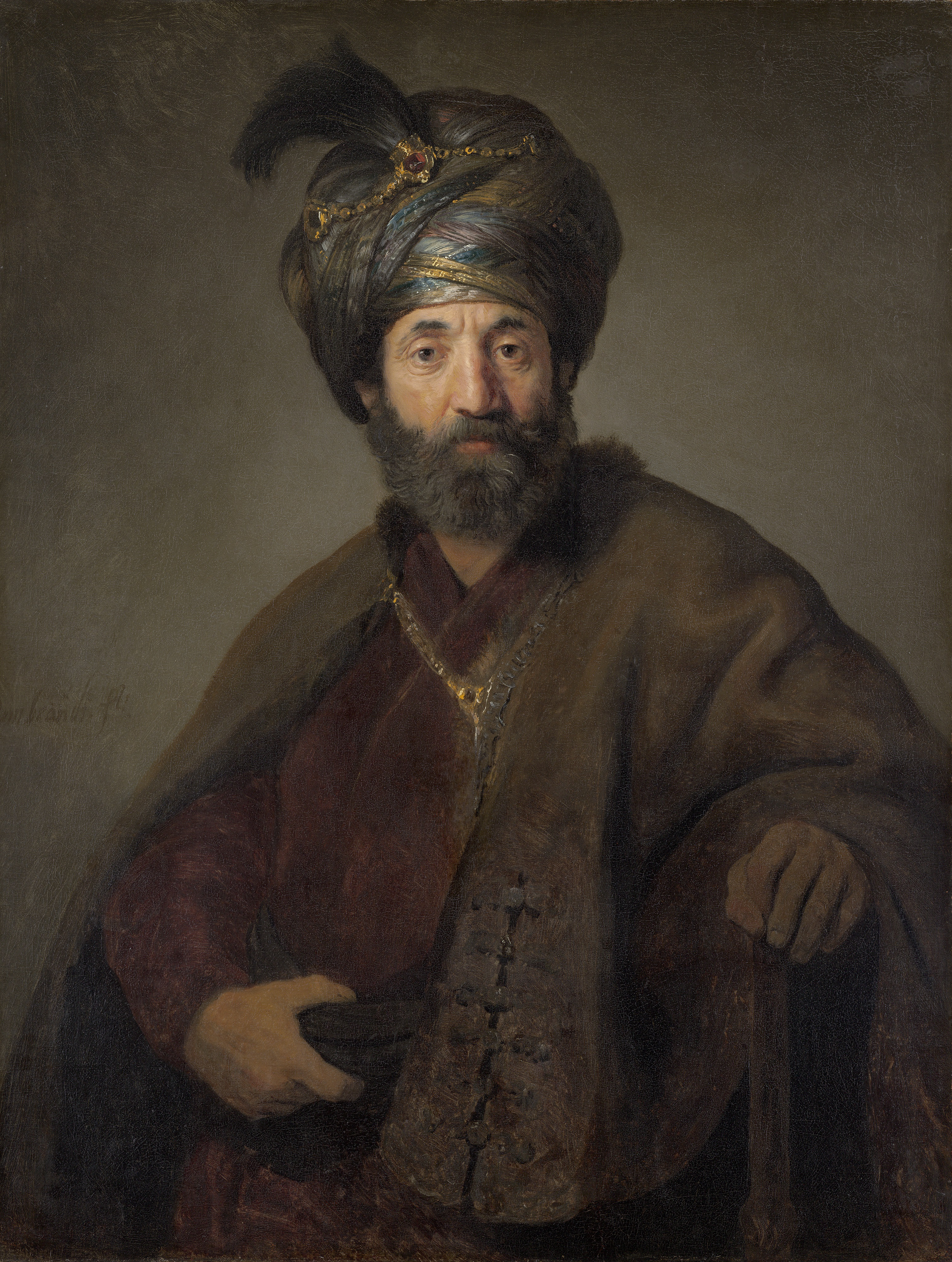
Rembrandt 1635: Man in Oriental Costume.

From 1608, Samuel Pallache served as an intermediary to discuss an alliance between Morocco and the Low Countries. In 1613, the Moroccan Ambassador Al-Hajari discussed in La Hague with the Dutch Prince Maurice of Orange the possibility of an alliance between the Dutch Republic, the Ottoman Empire, Morocco and the Moriscos, against the common enemy Spain. His book mentions the discussion for a combined offensive on Spain, as well as the religious reasons for the good relations between Islam and Protestantism at the time:

Their teachers [Luther and Calvin] warned them [Protestants] against the Pope and the worshippers of Idols; they also told them not to hate the Muslims because they are the sword of God in the world against the idol-worshippers. That is why they side with the Muslims.

— Al-Hajari, The Book of the Protector of Religion against the Unbelievers

During the Thirty Years War (1618–1648), the Dutch would strengthen contacts with the Moriscos against Spain.

=== French Huguenots and Islam ===
French Huguenots were in contact with the Moriscos in plans against Spain in the 1570s. Around 1575, plans were made for a combined attack of Aragonese Moriscos and Huguenots from Béarn under Henri de Navarre against Spanish Aragon, in agreement with the king of Algiers and the Ottoman Empire, but these projects foundered with the arrival of John of Austria in Aragon and the disarmament of the Moriscos. In 1576, a three-pronged fleet from Constantinople was planned to disembark between Murcia and Valencia while the French Huguenots would invade from the north and the Moriscos accomplish their uprising, but the Ottoman fleet failed to arrive.

=== Alliance between the Barbary states and England ===
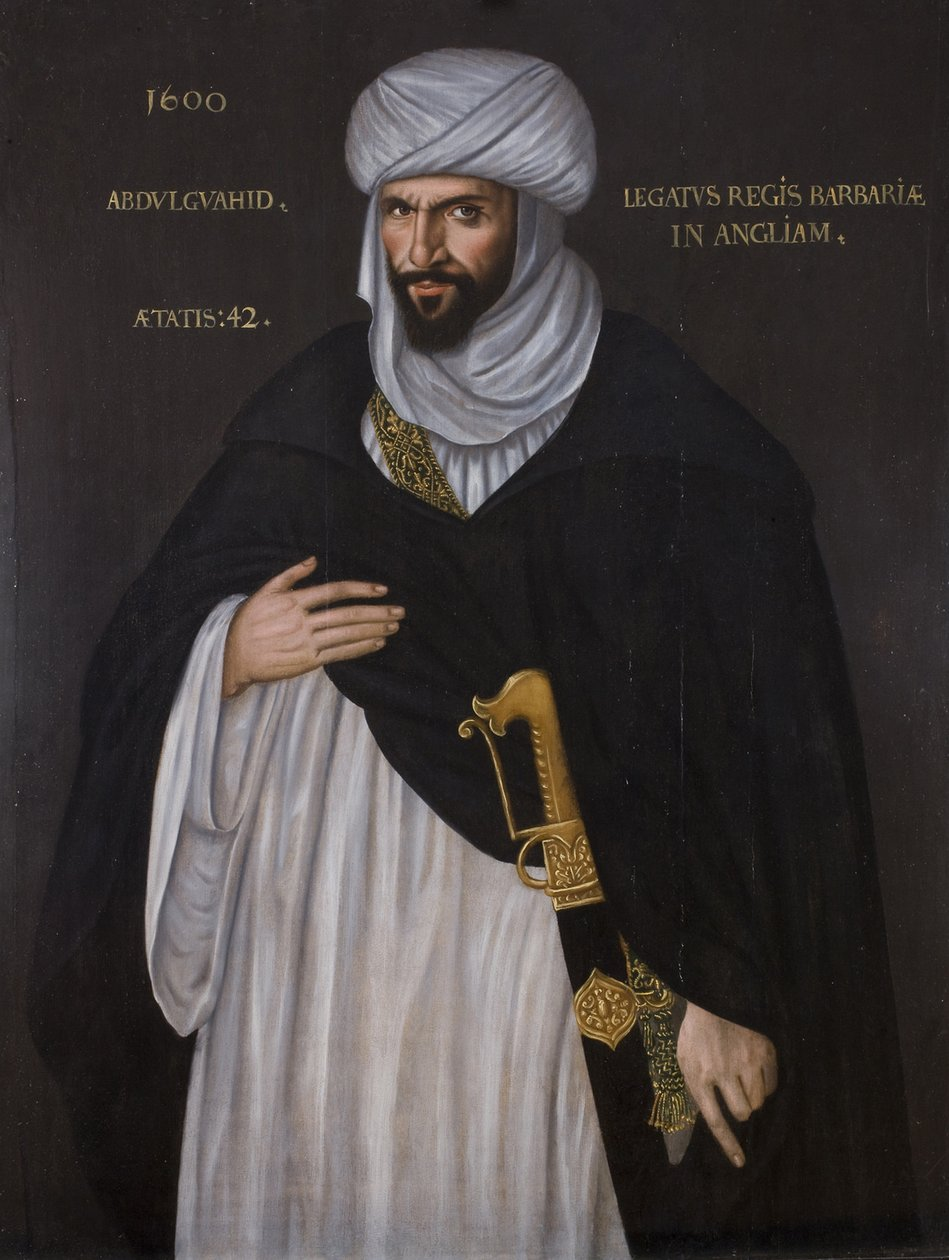
Abd el-Ouahed ben Messaoud, Moorish ambassador of the Morocco to the Court of Queen Elizabeth I in 1600.

Following the sailing of The Lion of Thomas Wyndham in 1551, and the 1585 establishment of the English Barbary Company, trade developed between England and the Barbary states, and especially Morocco. Diplomatic relations and an alliance were established between Elizabeth and the Barbary states. England entered in a trading relationship with Morocco detrimental to Spain, selling armour, ammunition, timber, metal in exchange for Moroccan sugar, in spite of a Papal ban, prompting the Papal Nuncio in Spain to say of Elizabeth: "there is no evil that is not devised by that woman, who, it is perfectly plain, succoured Mulocco (Abd-el-Malek) with arms, and especially with artillery".

In 1600, Abd el-Ouahed ben Messaoud, the principal secretary to the Moroccan ruler Mulai Ahmad al-Mansur, visited England as an ambassador to the court of Queen Elizabeth I. Abd el-Ouahed ben Messaoud spent 6 months at the court of Elizabeth, in order to negotiate an alliance against Spain. The Moroccan ruler wanted the help of an English fleet to invade Spain, Elizabeth refused, but welcomed the embassy as a sign of insurance, and instead accepted to establish commercial agreements. Queen Elizabeth and king Ahmad continued to discuss various plans for combined military operations, with Elizabeth requesting a payment of 100,000 pounds in advance to king Ahmad for the supply of a fleet, and Ahmad asking for a tall ship to be sent to get the money. Elizabeth "agreed to sell munitions supplies to Morocco, and she and Mulai Ahmad al-Mansur talked on and off about mounting a joint operation against the Spanish". Discussions however remained inconclusive, and both rulers died within two years of the embassy.

=== Collaboration between the Ottoman Empire and England ===
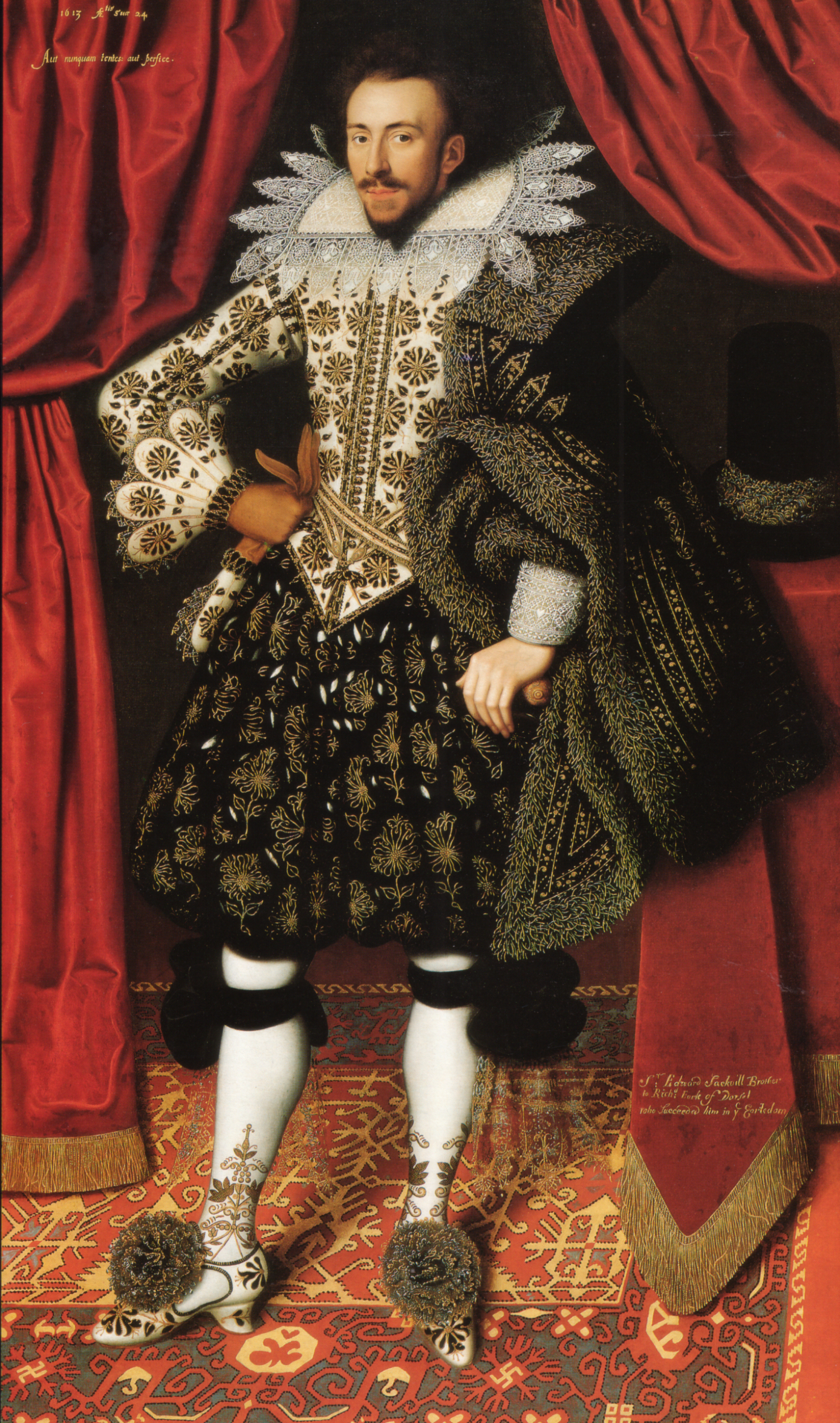
Ottoman carpets were fashionable items in English painting in the 17th century. Richard Sackville, 3rd Earl of Dorset by William Larkin, 1613, standing on a Lotto carpet.

Diplomatic relations were established with the Ottoman Empire during the reign of Elizabeth, with the chartering of the Levant Company and the dispatch of the first English ambassador to the Porte, William Harborne, in 1578. Numerous envoys were dispatched in both directions and epistolary exchanges occurred between Elizabeth and Sultan Murad III. In one correspondence, Murad entertained the notion that Islam and Protestantism had "much more in common than either did with Roman Catholicism, as both rejected the worship of idols", and argued for an alliance between England and the Ottoman Empire. To the dismay of Catholic Europe, England exported tin and lead (for cannon-casting) and ammunition to the Ottoman Empire, and Elizabeth seriously discussed joint military operations with Murad III during the outbreak of war with Spain in 1585, as Francis Walsingham was lobbying for a direct Ottoman military involvement against the common Spanish enemy.

English writers of the period often expressed admiration towards the "Turks" and the "Ottoman Empire", describing it as endowed with "Majestical and August form and features" and being the "Powerfullest nation in Europe", saying that the Turks were "the only modern people, great in action- he who would behold these times in their greatest glory, could not find a better scene than Turky" and that they had "incredible civility".

=== Anglo-Turkish piracy ===
After peace was made with Catholic Spain in 1604, English pirates nevertheless continued to raid Christian shipping in the Mediterranean, this time under the protection of the Muslim rulers of the Barbary States, and often converting to Islam in the process, in what has been described as Anglo-Turkish piracy.

=== Transylvania and Hungary ===
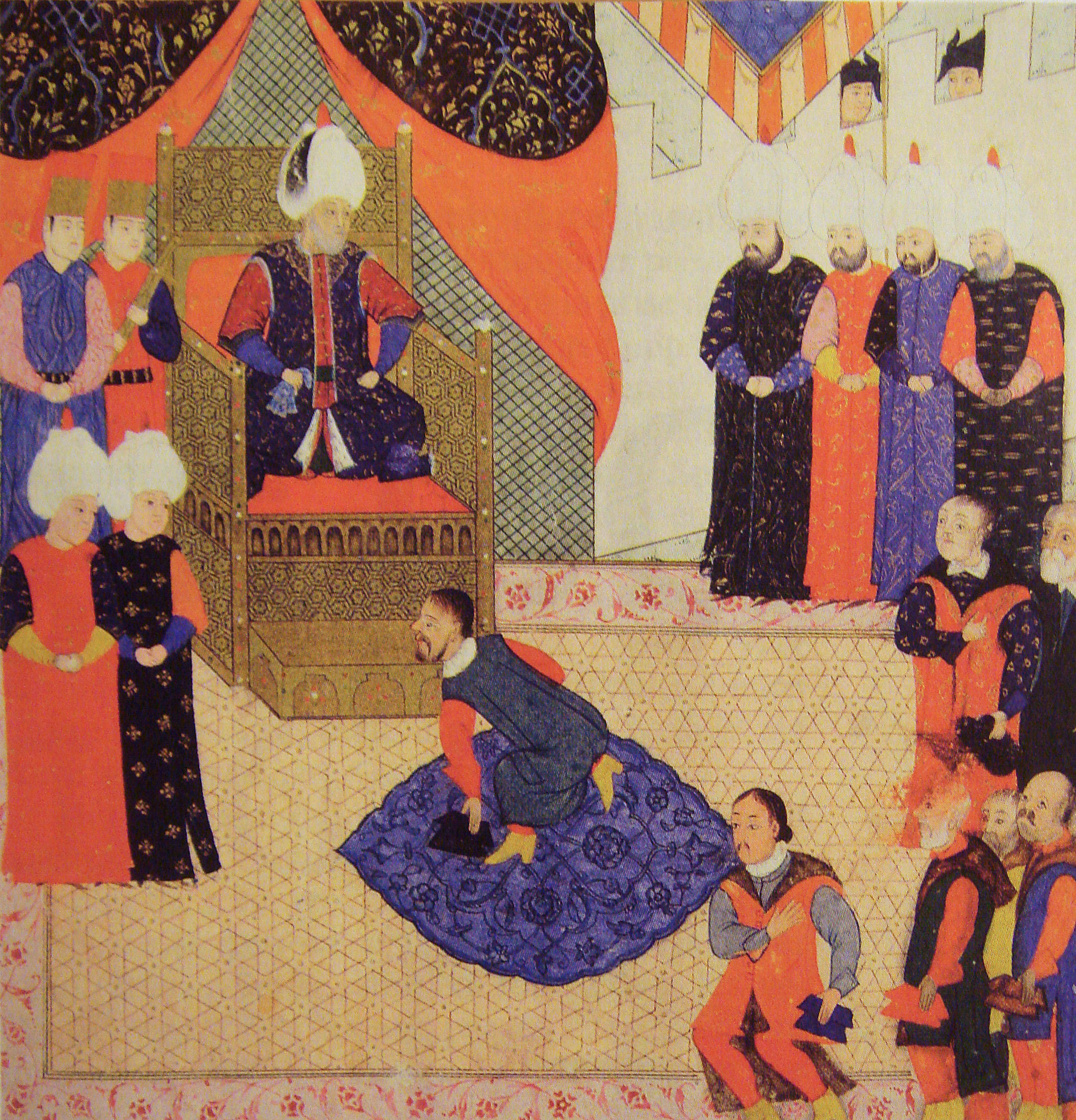
King John Sigismund of Hungary with Suleiman the Magnificent in 1556.

In eastern Central Europe, particularly in Transylvania, tolerant Ottoman rule meant that the Protestant communities there were protected from Catholic persecutions by the Habsburg. In the 16th century, the Ottomans supported the Calvinists in Transylvania and Hungary and practised religious toleration, giving almost complete freedom, although heavy taxation was imposed. Suleiman the Magnificent in particular supported John Sigismund of Hungary, allowing him to establish the Unitarian Church in Transylvania. By the end of the century, large parts of the population in Hungary thus became either Lutheran or Calvinist, to become the Reformed Church in Hungary.

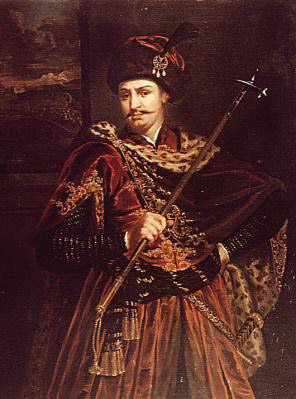
The Hungarian leader Imre Thököly (1657–1705) requested and obtained Ottoman intervention to help defend Protestantism against the repression of the Catholic Habsburg.

In the 17th century, Protestant communities again asked for Ottoman help against the Habsburg Catholics. When in 1606 Emperor Rudolph II suppressed religious liberty, Prince István Bocskay (1558–1606) of Transylvania, allied with the Ottoman Turks, achieved autonomy for Transylvania, including guaranteeing religious freedom in the rest of Hungary for a short time. In 1620, the Transylvanian Protestant prince Bethlen Gabor, fearful of the Catholic policies of Ferdinand II, requested a protectorate by Sultan Osman II, so that "the Ottoman Empire became the one and only ally of great-power status which the rebellious Bohemian states could muster after they had shaken off Habsburg rule and had elected Frederick V as a Protestant king", Ambassadors were exchanged, with Heinrich Bitter visiting Istanbul in January 1620, and Mehmed Aga visiting Prague in July 1620. The Ottomans offered a force of 60,000 cavalry to Frederick and plans were made for an invasion of Poland with 400,000 troops in exchange for the payment of an annual tribute to the Sultan. The Ottomans defeated the Poles, which were supporting the Habsburgs in the Thirty Years' War, at the Battle of Cecora in September–October 1620, but were not able to further intervene efficiently before the Bohemian defeat at the Battle of the White Mountain in November 1620.

At the end of the century, the Hungarian leader Imre Thököly, in resistance to the anti-Protestant policies of the Habsburg, asked and obtained, the military help of the Ottoman Grand Vizier Kara Mustafa, leading to the 1683 Ottoman attack on the Habsburg Empire and the Battle of Vienna.

In the 16th century, Hungary had become almost entirely Protestant, with first Lutheranism, then soon afterwards Calvinism, but following the Habsburg policy of Counter-Reformation the western part of the country finally returned to Catholicism, while the eastern part has managed to this day to remain strongly Protestant: "although the Habsburg succeeded in re-Catholicising Royal Hungary, east of the Tisza the Reformation remained almost intact in the spirit of peaceful coexistence between the three recognized nations and respect for their diverse creeds".

Rich Protestant Transylvanian Saxon merchants traded with the Ottoman Empire and often donated Anatolian rugs to their churches as a wall decoration more according to their iconoclastic beliefs than the images of the saints used by the Catholics and the Orthodox. Churches like the Black Church of Brașov still hold collections of rugs.

=== Relations with Persia ===
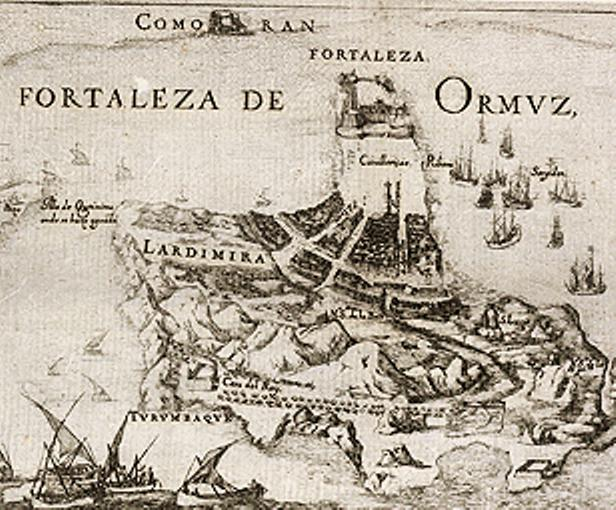
The English and the Persian formed an alliance against the Portuguese in the 1622 Capture of Ormuz (1622).

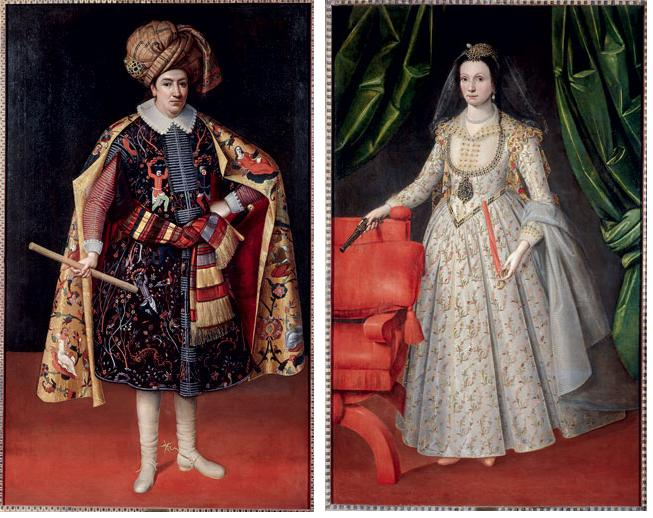
Robert Shirley and his Circassian wife Teresia, c.1624–1627. Robert Shirley modernized the Persian army, and led the 1609–1615 Persian embassy to Europe.

At about the same time England also maintained a significant relationship with Persia. In 1616, a trade agreement was reached between Shah Abbas and the East India Company and in 1622 "a joint Anglo-Persian force expelled the Portuguese and Spanish traders from the Persian Gulf" in the Capture of Ormuz.

A group of English adventurers, led by Robert Shirley had a key role in modernizing the Persian army and developing its contacts with the West. In 1624, Robert Shirley led an embassy to England in order to obtain trade agreements.

== Later relations ==
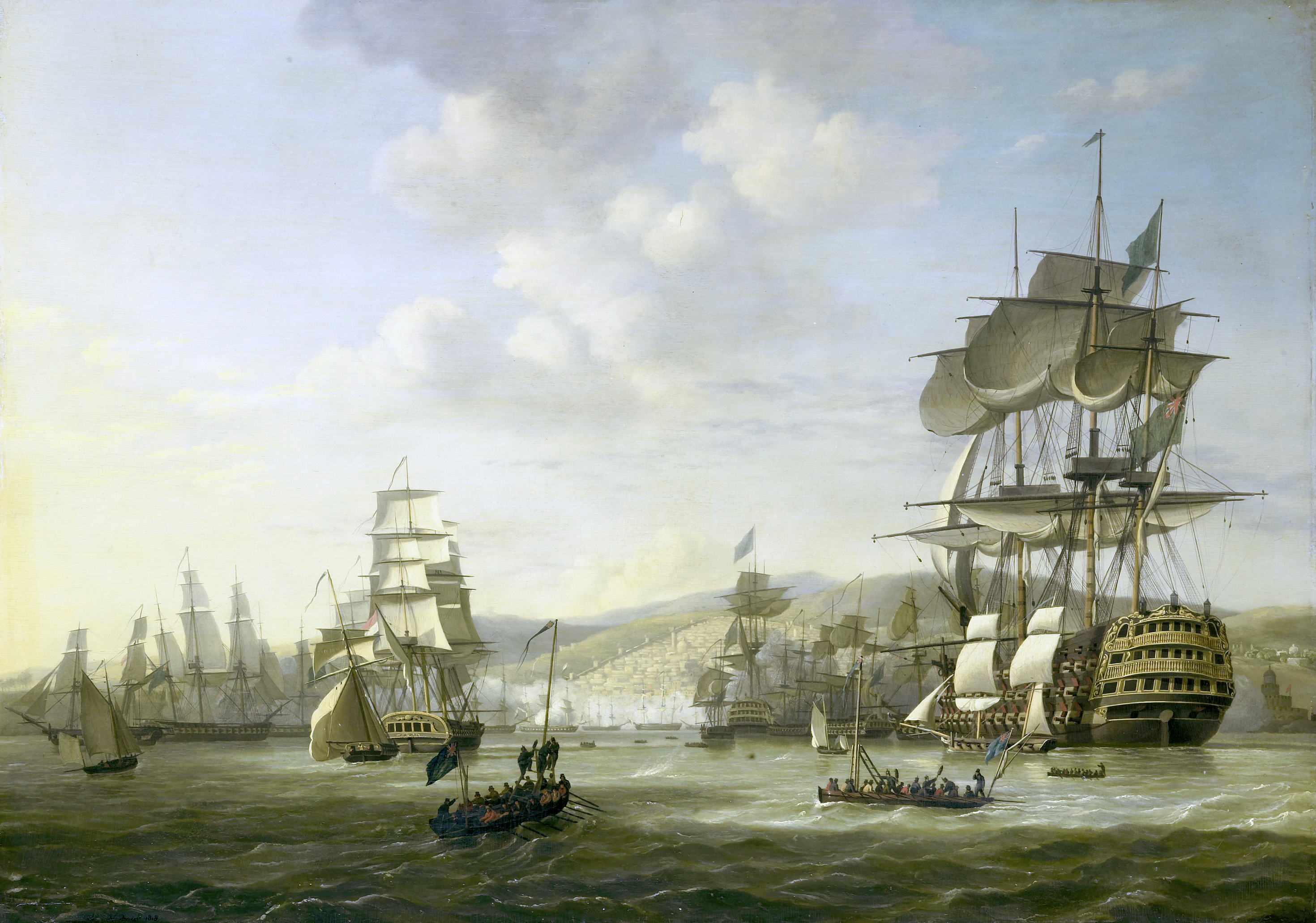
The bombardment of Algiers by the Anglo-Dutch fleet in support of an ultimatum to release European slaves, August 1816

These unique relations between Protestantism and Islam mainly took place during the 16th and 17th century. The ability of Protestant nations to disregard Papal bans, and therefore to establish freer commercial and other types of relations with Muslim and pagan countries, may partly explain their success in developing influence and markets in areas previously discovered by Spain and Portugal. Progressively however, Protestantism became able to consolidate itself and became less dependent on external help. At the same time, the power of the Ottoman Empire waned from its 16th century peak, making attempts at alliance and conciliation less relevant. However, in 1796 the Treaty of Tripoli (between the United States of America and the Subjects of Tripoli of Barbary) noted "that no pretext arising from religious opinions shall ever produce an interruption of the harmony existing between the two countries."

During the Seven Years' War, Protestant Kingdom of Prussia signed a treaty of friendship in 1761 with the Ottoman Empire but an anti-Hapsburg alliance was rejected by the Sublime Porte. Fearing the Orthodox-Protestant Russo-Prussian alliance, the Habsburg monarchy forged a secret alliance with the Ottoman Empire accepting it as a part of the European great powers in 1771. Prussia would later oppose the Last Turkish War and form an alliance with the Ottomans against Austria in 1790 which ended in a permanent peace treaty. The Protestant Triple Alliance sought Russia and Austria to accept a peace based on the status quo and Prussia and Great Britain made war threats but only Sweden joined the war on Ottoman side.

Eventually, relations between Protestantism and Islam have often tended to become conflicted. Protestants were among the Europeans enslaved by Barbary pirates in slave raids on ships and by raids on coastal towns from Ireland to the Netherlands and the southwest of Britain, as far north as Iceland. On some occasions, settlements such as Baltimore in Ireland were abandoned following a raid, only being resettled many years later. Between 1609 and 1616, England alone lost 466 merchant ships to Barbary pirates.

In the context of the United States, Protestant missionaries seem to have been active in portraying Islam in an unfavourable light, representing it as "the epitome of anti-Christian darkness and political tyranny", in a way that helped construct in opposition an American national identity as "modern, democratic and Christian". In the 20th and 21st centuries, some famous Protestants have criticized Islam like Pat Robertson, Jerry Falwell, Jerry Vines, R. Albert Mohler, Jr. and Franklin Graham.

== Comparative elements ==
Besides the obvious theological differences between the two religious, there are also many similarities in their outlooks and attitudes to faith (especially with Sunni Islam), especially in respect to textual criticism, iconoclasm, tendencies to fundamentalism, rejection of marriage as a sacrament, rejection of necessary penance by priests, and the rejection of monastic orders.

=== Textual criticism ===
Islam and Protestantism have in common a reliance on textual criticism of the book. This historical precedence combines to fact that Islam incorporates to a certain extent the Jewish and Christian traditions, recognizing the same God, the Hebrew prophets, and including Jesus (those as a prophet).

=== Iconoclasm ===
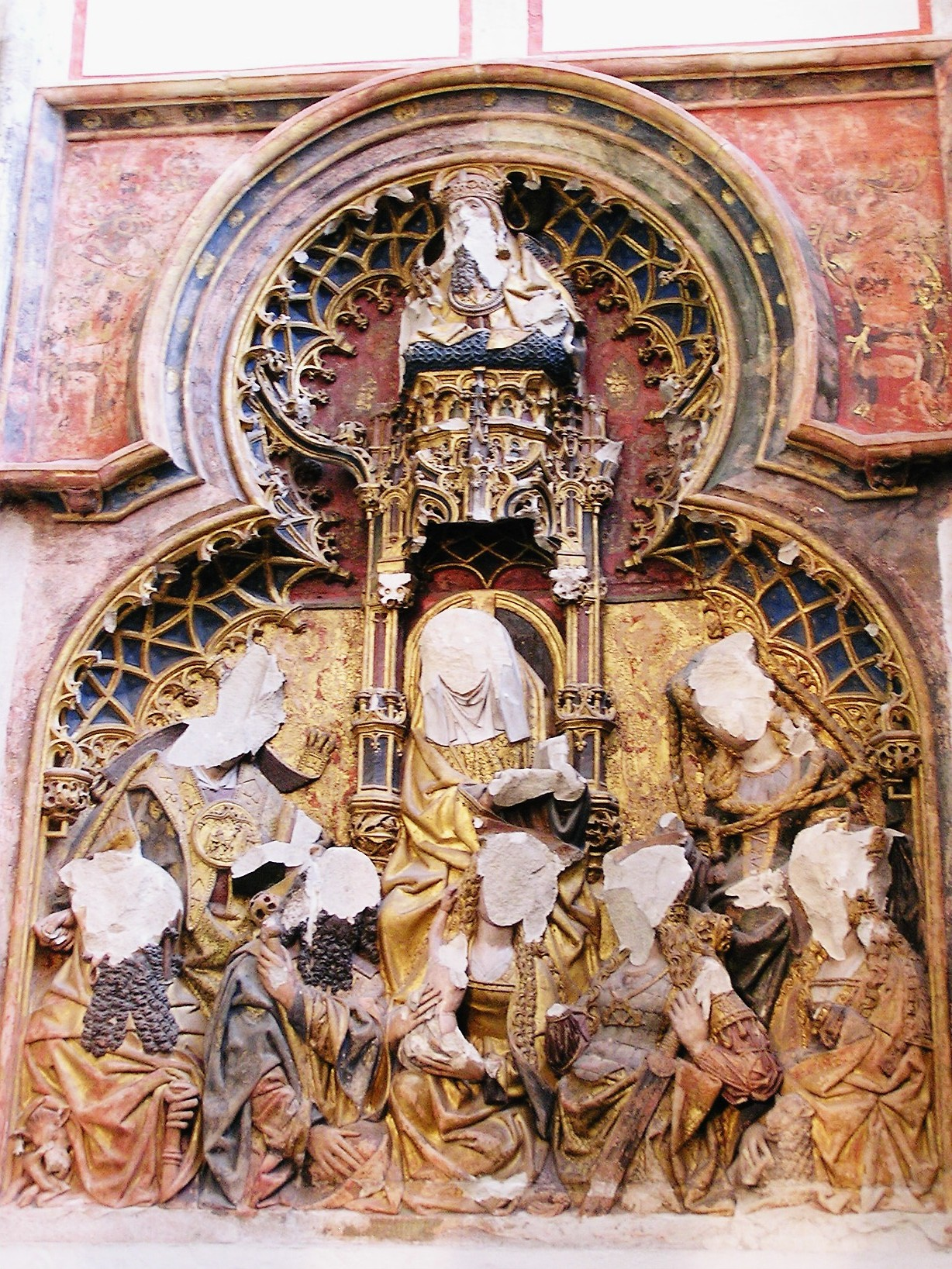
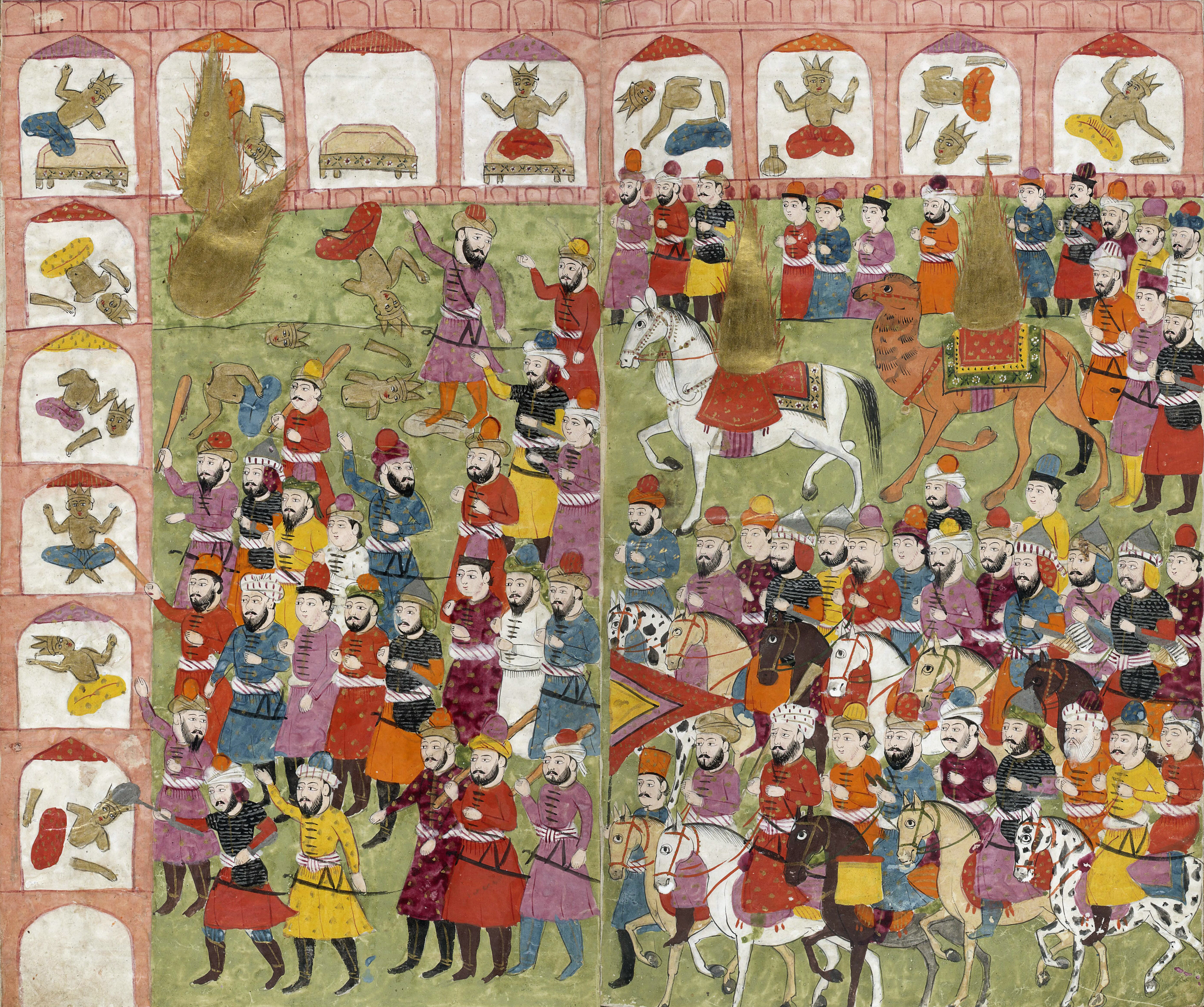
Left image: Relief statues in the Cathedral of Saint Martin, Utrecht, attacked in Reformation iconoclasm in the 16th century.
Right image: 1808 Islamic miniature depicting the destruction of icons at the Kaaba by Muhammad and Ali

The rejection of images in worship, although more prominent in Islam, is also found in some forms of Protestantism. This was already extensively recognized from the earliest times, as in the correspondence between Elizabeth I of England and her Ottoman Empire counterparts, in which she implied that Protestantism was closer to Islam than to Catholicism. This is also a point developed by Martin Luther in On War against the Turk, in which he praised the Ottomans for their rigorous iconoclasm:

It is part of the Turks' holiness, also, that they tolerate no images or pictures and are even holier than our destroyers of images. For our destroyers tolerate, and are glad to have, images on gulden, groschen, rings, and ornaments; but the Turk tolerates none of them and stamps nothing but letters on his coins.

— On War against the Turk 1529 Martin Luther

Rich Protestant Transylvanian Saxon merchants traded with the Ottoman Empire and often donated Anatolian rugs to their churches as a wall decoration more according to their iconoclastic beliefs than the images of the saints used by the Catholics and the Orthodox. Churches like the Black Church of Brasov still hold collections of such rugs.

=== Fundamentalism ===
Islam and Protestantism have in common that they are both based on a direct analysis of the scriptures (the Bible for Protestantism and the Quran for Islam). This can be contrasted to Catholicism in which knowledge is analysed, formalized and distributed by the existing structure of the Church. Islam and Protestantism are thus both based on "a rhetorical commitment to a universal mission", when Catholicism is based on an international structure. This leads to possibilities of fundamentalism, based on the popular reinterpretation of scriptures by radical elements. The term "fundamentalism" was first used in America in the 1920, to describe "the consciously anti-modernist wing of Protestantism".

Islamic and Protestant fundamentalism also tend to be very normative of individuals' behaviours: "Religious fundamentalism in Protestantism and Islam is very concerned with norms surrounding gender, sexuality, and family", although Protestant fundamentalism tends to focus on individual behaviour, whereas Islamic fundamentalism tends to develop laws for the community.

The most notable trend of Islamic fundamentalism, Salafism, is based upon a literal reading of the Qur'an and Sunnah without relying on the interpretations of Muslim philosophers, rejecting the need for Taqlid for recognized scholars. Fundamentalist Protestantism is similar, in that the 'traditions of men' and the Church Fathers are rejected in favor of a literalist interpretation of the Bible, which is seen as inerrant. Islamic Fundamentalists and Protestant Fundamentalists often reject contextual interpretation. Another similarity with Protestantism and Salafism is criticism of saint veneration and belief in the power of relics and tombs, and emphasis on praying to God alone.

=== Islamic Protestantism ===
Parallels have regularly been drawn in the similar attitudes of Islam and Protestantism towards the Scriptures. Some trends in Muslim revival have thus been defined as "Islamic Protestantism". In a sense "Islamization is a political movement to combat Westernization using the methods of Western culture, namely a form of Protestantism within Islam itself".

=== Vitality ===
Islam and (popular) Protestantism share a common vitality in the modern world: "The two most dynamic religious movements in the contemporary world are what can loosely be called popular Protestantism and resurgent Islam", although their approach to civil society is different.

== Calls for an "Islamic Reformation" ==
The concept of a "Reformation" of Islam, bearing a resemblance to the Protestant Reformation in Christianity, has been called for (by Hashem Aghajari, Thomas L. Friedman, Ayaan Hirsi Ali, Naser Khader), examined (by Michaelle Browers, Charles Kurzman, Nader A. Hashemi, Fred R. Dallmayr, Dale F. Eickelman, Mustafa Akyol), and attacked (Mehdi Hasan, Todd Green), by scholars and observers in a number of books and essays going back to at least to the early 20th century.

Proponents assert a Reformation is needed to fight "political violence" done "in the name of religion,” (Hirsi Ali), to save Islam from "intolerance and dogmatism" (Mustafa Akyol), "hatred and racism" (Naser Khader), "lifeless, anti-modern, anti-Western fundamentalism" (Thomas Friedman). Unlike Protestants who saw reformation as (in part) a means to reassert the holy book of Christianity (i.e. the Bible) as the sole infallible source of authority for faith and practice, a leading Islamic reformation advocate, Hirsi Ali, calls for an end to literalist reading of the Quran, and an opening of it "to interpretation and criticism".

Opponents of a Protestant-style religious reformation for Islam note that the first successful protestant reformer (Martin Luther), was a virulent anti-semite, who urged that peasants revolting against lords be crushed. Also noted is that the "clerical class" serving under a pope that Luther wanted to abolish does not exist in (Sunni) Islam; that an earlier reform movement (Wahhabism) in Islam based on purifying the religion of cultural accretions produced not tolerance and pluralism but the opposite; that the immediate result of the Protestant Reformation was not an era of enlightenment, but horrendous religious wars that cost tens of millions their lives; and that the criticism and reform proposals of pious, practicing Muslims active in their religious community may have an impact on Islam, but not those of ex-Muslims such as Hirsi Ali.

== See also ==
- Franco-Ottoman alliance, an alliance between France and the Ottoman Empire during this time
- Islam in England
- Protestantism in Turkey
- Protestantism in Pakistan
- Mormonism and Islam
- Islam and other religions
- Divisions of the world in Islam
- Pallache family
- Protestantism and Judaism
- Schmalkaldic League
- On War Against the Turk
