= Liever Turks dan Paaps =

16th century Dutch revolutionary slogan

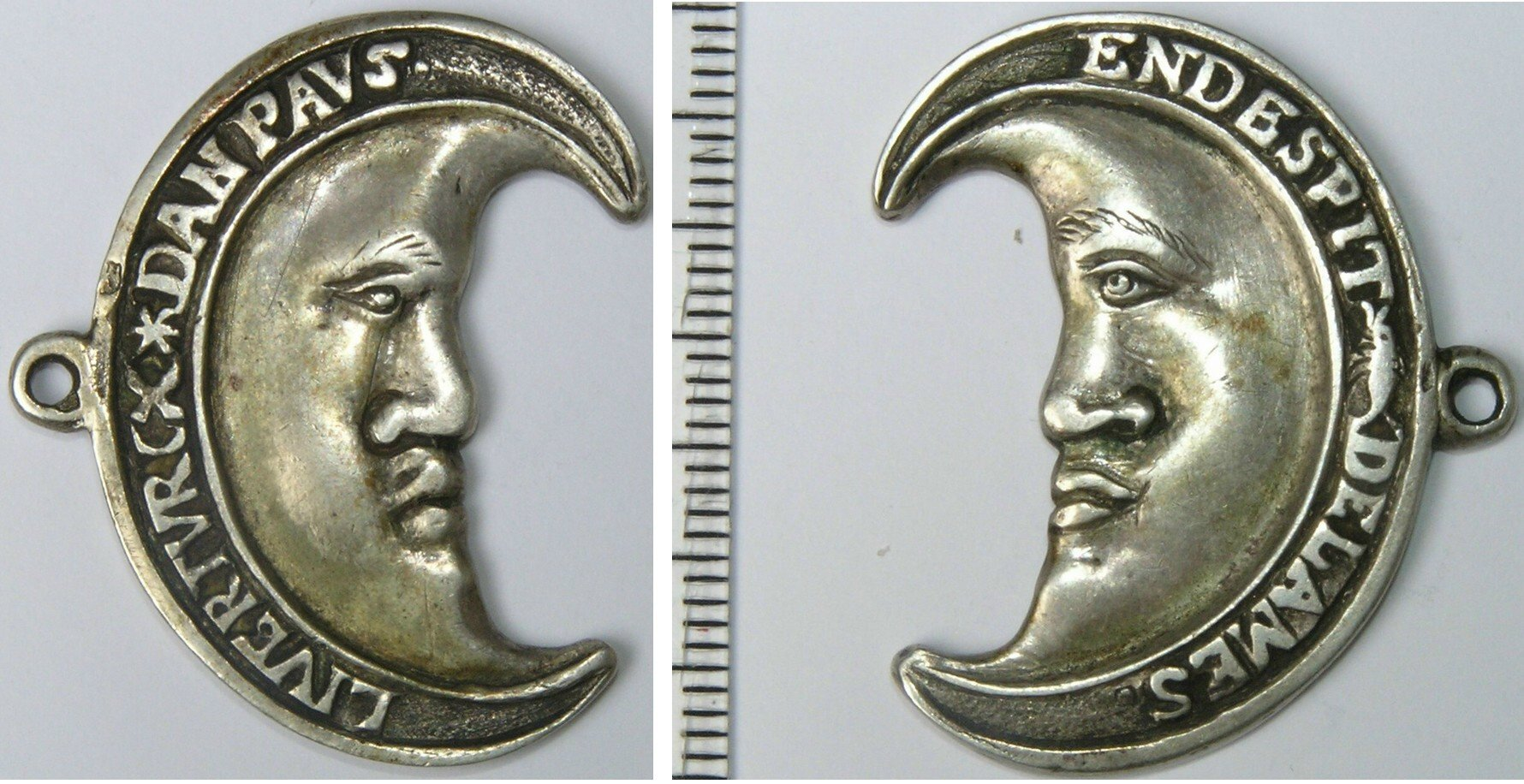
A Dutch crescent-shaped Geuzen medal at the time of the anti-Spanish Dutch Revolt, with the slogan "Liver Turcx dan Paus" ("Rather Turkish than Pope..."), and "En Despit de Lames", French for "In Spite of Blades."

Liever Turks dan Paaps ("Rather Turkish than Popish"), also Liever Turksch dan Paus ("Rather Turkish than Pope"), was a Dutch Protestant slogan during the Dutch Revolt of the end of the 16th century. The slogan was used by the Dutch mercenary naval forces (the "Sea Beggars") in their fight against Catholic Spain.

== Origins ==
During the Dutch Revolt, the Dutch were under such a desperate situation that they looked for help from many places no matter their religion, and "indeed even a Turk", as wrote the secretary of Jan van Nassau. In 1566, diplomat Joseph Nasi contacted Protestants in Antwerp to discuss an Ottoman offer of assistance against the Spaniards. In 1569, William of Orange sent a secret envoy to Nasi asking the Ottomans to support the Dutch Revolt against their common Spanish enemies. Orange had already sent ambassadors to the Ottoman Empire for help in 1566, and it is speculated that it was in response to William's request that Selim II sent his fleet to attack the Spanish at Tunis in 1574. The Dutch viewed Ottoman successes against the Habsburgs with great interest, and saw Ottoman campaigns in the Mediterranean as an indicator of relief on the Dutch front. William wrote around 1565:

The Turks are very threatening, which will mean, we believe, that the king will not come to the Netherlands this year.

— Letter of William of Orange to his brother, circa 1565.

The English Catholic author William Rainolds (1544–1594) wrote a pamphlet entitled "Calvino-Turcismus" in criticism of these tendencies.

The phrase "Liever Turks dan Paaps" was coined as a way to express that life under the Muslim Ottoman Sultan would have been more desirable than life under the Catholic King of Spain. The Flemish noble D'Esquerdes wrote to this effect that he:

would rather become a tributary to the Turks than live against his conscience and be treated according to those [anti-heresy] edicts.

— Letter of Flemish noble D'Esquerdes.

== Meaning ==
While the Turks were known for having religious tolerance within their dominions, king Philip II of Spain did not tolerate Protestant faiths. According to a 1570 letter of encouragement to the "Lutheran group" (Luteran taifesi) in "Flanders and other Spanish provinces", which has been preserved in the archives of Feridun Ahmed Bey, the Ottoman sultan (at this point Selim II) promised the rebels in the Netherlands that he would send them troops whenever they were ready to rise up against Philip II. The sultan claimed that he felt close to them, "since they did not worship idols, believed in one God and fought against the Pope and Emperor". Furthermore, various religious refugees, such as the Huguenots, some Anglicans, Quakers, Anabaptists and even Jesuits and Capuchins were able to find refuge at Constantinople and elsewhere in the Ottoman Empire, where they were given rights of residence and worship. Further, the Ottomans supported the Calvinists, not only in their territories of Transylvania and Hungary, but also in France.

The slogan Liever Turks dan Paaps did not mean the Dutch seriously contemplated coming under Ottoman suzerainty, as they were far away from that empire's sphere of influence; rather, it was an expression of their antipathy to the Catholic regime they had been subjected to.

== Similar uses ==
A similar statement, "It would be better to see the turban of the Turks reigning in the center of the City (i.e., Constantinople) than the Latin mitre" (Greek: κρειττότερόν ἐστιν εἰδέναι ἐν μέσῃ τῇ Πόλει φακιόλιον βασιλεῦον Τούρκων, ἢ καλύπτραν λατινικήν) is ascribed by the historian Doukas to the last megas doux of the Byzantine Empire, Loukas Notaras, as an expression of Eastern Orthodox hostility to the Latin Church and the attempts at a union of the Churches. The veracity of the attribution of the quote to Notaras is unlikely, but it does reflect the views of some members of the anti-Unionist party in Constantinople, even at the eve of the Fall of Constantinople.

== See also ==
- Islam and Protestantism
- Anglo-Turkish piracy
- Franco-Ottoman alliance
- Netherlands–Turkey relations
- Better dead than red — similarly structured slogan
