= On War Against the Turk =

Book by Martin Luther

- Author: Martin Luther
- Original title: Vom Kriege wider die Türken
- Language: German
- Genre: War, religion
- Publication date: 1528
- Publication place: Holy Roman Empire
- LC Class: DR472 .L88

On War Against the Turk (German: Vom Kriege wider die Türken) was a book written by Martin Luther in 1528 and published in 1529. It was one of several pamphlets and sermons by Martin Luther about Islam and resistance to the Ottoman Empire, during the critical period of territorial expansion of the Ottoman Empire in Europe, marked by the capture of Buda in 1526 and the siege of Vienna in 1529.

== Content ==
Initially, in his 1518 Explanation of the Ninety-five Theses, Luther had argued against resisting the Turks, whom he presented as a scourge intentionally sent by God to sinning Christians, and that resisting it would have been equivalent to resisting the will of God. This position had been initially shared by Erasmus as well, but was strongly criticized by authors such as Thomas More:

"It is a gentle holiness to abstain for devotion from resisting the Turk, and in the meanwhile to rise up in routs and fight against Christian men, and destroy as that sect has done, many a good religious house, spoiled, maimed and slain many a good virtuous man, robbed, polluted, and pulled down many a goodly church of Christ."

— Thomas More.

With the Turkish advance becoming ever more threatening, however, in 1528 Luther modified his stance and wrote On War against the Turk and in 1529 Sermon against the Turk, encouraging the German people and Emperor Charles V to resist the invasion.

Compared with his anger over what he perceived as the annoying-but-not-incurable stubbornness of Judaism, Luther's positions against Islam portrayed an attitude of hopelessness and acceptance of failure, resulting in milder condemnation. On the one hand Luther extensively criticized the principles of Islam, but on the other hand he also expressed a view that the practice of the Islamic faith was not worth the effort to combat as strongly:

"Let the Turk believe and live as he will, just as one lets the papacy and other false Christians live."

— Excerpt from On war against the Turk, 1529.

In On War Against the Turk, Luther is less critical of the Turks than he is of the Pope, whom he calls an anti-Christ, or the Jews, whom he describes as "the Devil incarnate". He urges his contemporaries to also see that some Turks, guided by their beliefs, had good intentions. He refers to some who were favorable to the Ottoman Empire "who actually want the Turk to come and rule, because they think that our German people are wild and uncivilized – indeed that they are half-devil and half-man".

He also argued that the fight against the Turks should not be a holy war, but only a secular one, made in self-defense (thus a war not to gain territory but to protect neighbors' lives and property as taught in the Ten Commandments), and led by the secular authorities of the Emperor and the Princes, and strongly warned against leading it as a religious war:

"...as though our people were an army of Christians against the Turks, who were enemies of Christ. This is absolutely contrary to Christ's doctrine and name"

— Excerpt from On war against the Turk, 1529.

== See also ==
- Erhalt uns, Herr, bei deinem Wort, a 1542 hymn by Martin Luther "for the children to sing against the two arch-enemies of Christ, and His Holy Church, the Pope and the Turks".
- Islam and Protestantism
