= Jacques Jonghelinck =

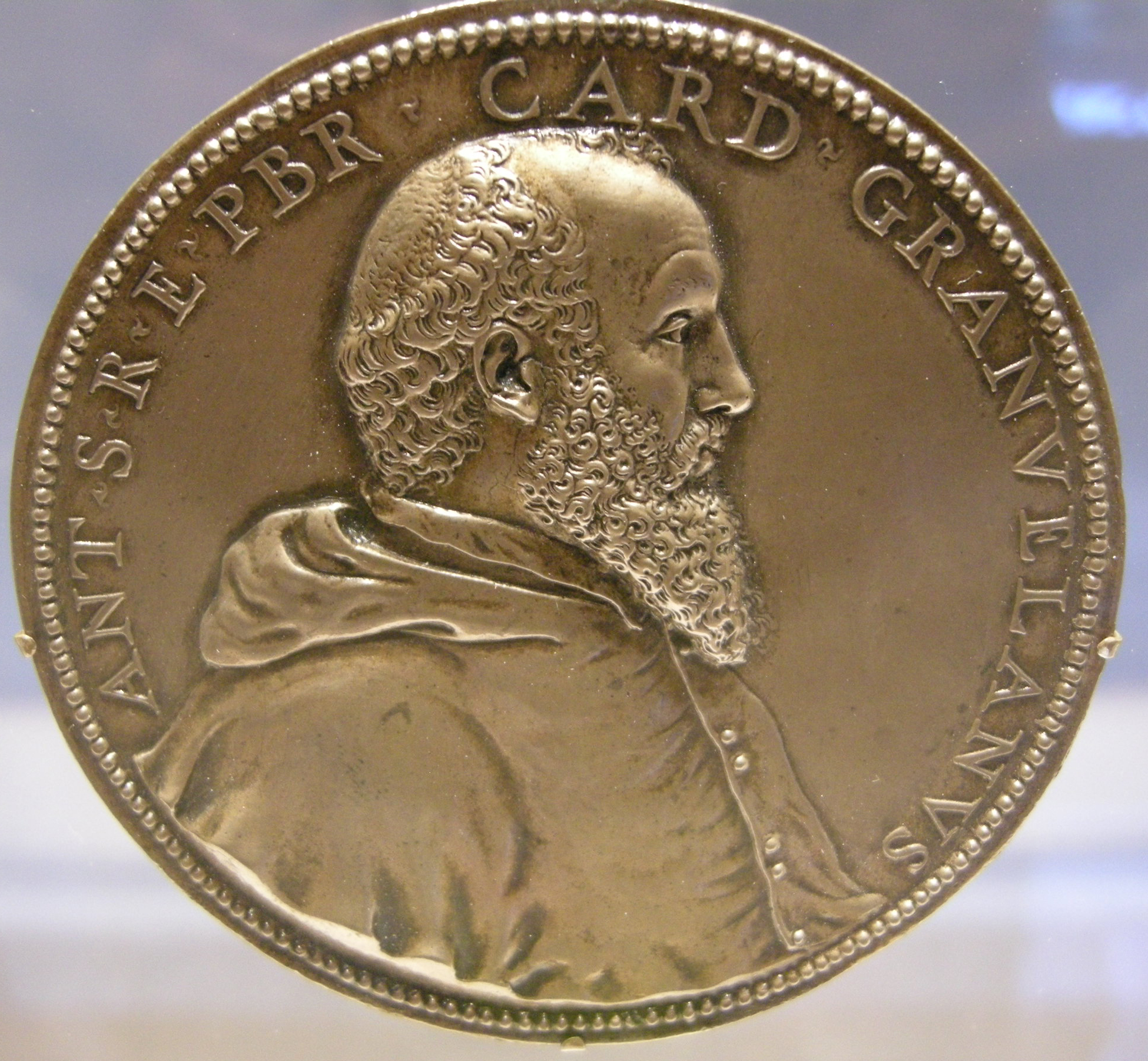
The medal of Antoine Perrenot de Granvelle, post 1561

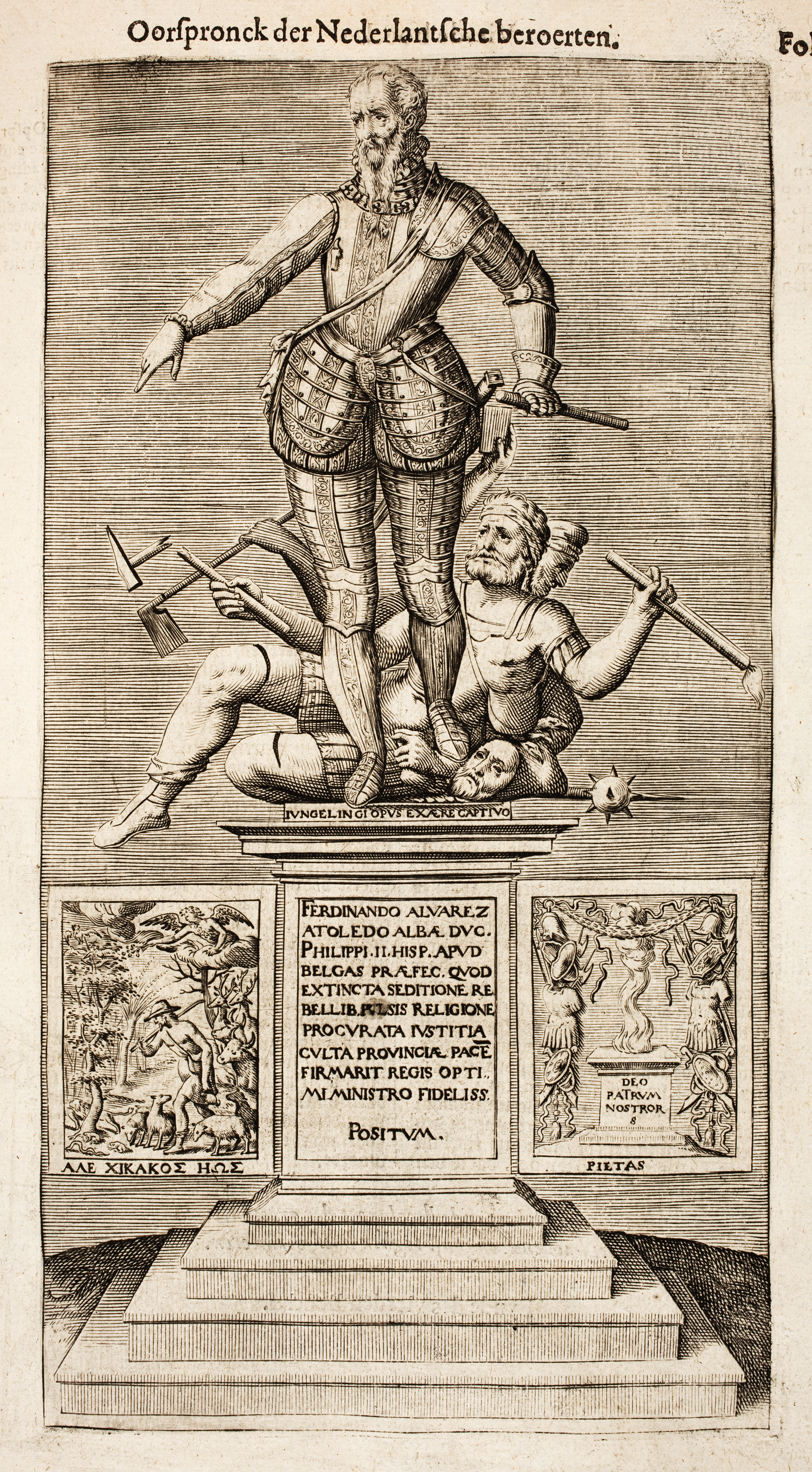
Engraving of the statue of Fernando Álvarez de Toledo in Antwerp by Jacques Jonghelinck. From Nederlantsche Oorloghen by Pieter Bor

Jacques Jonghelinck (Antwerp, 21 October 1530 - 1606) was a Flemish sculptor and medallist working in Brussels in the Mannerist style common to the Catholic courts of Western Europe.

== Career ==
He moved from Antwerp to set up a workshop in Brussels in 1562 and was appointed court sculptor the following year.

In Brussels, he specialized in funeral monuments for an aristocratic clientele and was also a successful merchant, and financier. He belonged to the immediate entourage of the diplomat Antoine Perrenot de Granvelle, President of the Council of State from 1556 to 1564.

He collaborated as sculptor and bronze-founder with the sculptor Joos Aerts in the gilt-bronze and black marble memorial of Charles the Bold (died 1477) in the Onze Lieve Vrouwekerk ("Church of Our Lady") (Bruges), completed in 1563.

Letters between de Granvelle, now in Madrid, and his secretary Morillon in Brussels show that Jonghelinck, now as medallist, made a mould for a small medal in the spring of 1566. Successively, he cast medals in lead, tin, copper, silver or gold of the type known as Geuzen medals.

One of his masterworks, a full-length, over-lifesize bronze of Fernando Alvarez de Toledo, Duke of Alba – made in 1569 from the gunmetal of the 16 cannon captured at Jemmingen and erected in the citadel of Antwerp – was destroyed after the death of Alba on orders of King Philip II. Even in Italy and Madrid, the statue was thought to be too pompous and to exhibit unnecessary cruelty. It is a coincidence that Jonghelinck at that moment had already returned to Antwerp, where he was "waardijn" (director) of the mint.

His bronze of Silenus astride a Cask, 1570, is the figure for a fountain in the gardens of the Aranjuez; it replaced Giambologna's Samson and a Philistine, which had been given to Charles, Prince of Wales in 1623, on the ill-fated diplomatic mission over the "Spanish Match".

His brother, Niclaes Jonghelinck, was a major patron of Pieter Brueghel who owned 16 pictures of his by 1565, including many of his best known.
