= Geuzen medals =

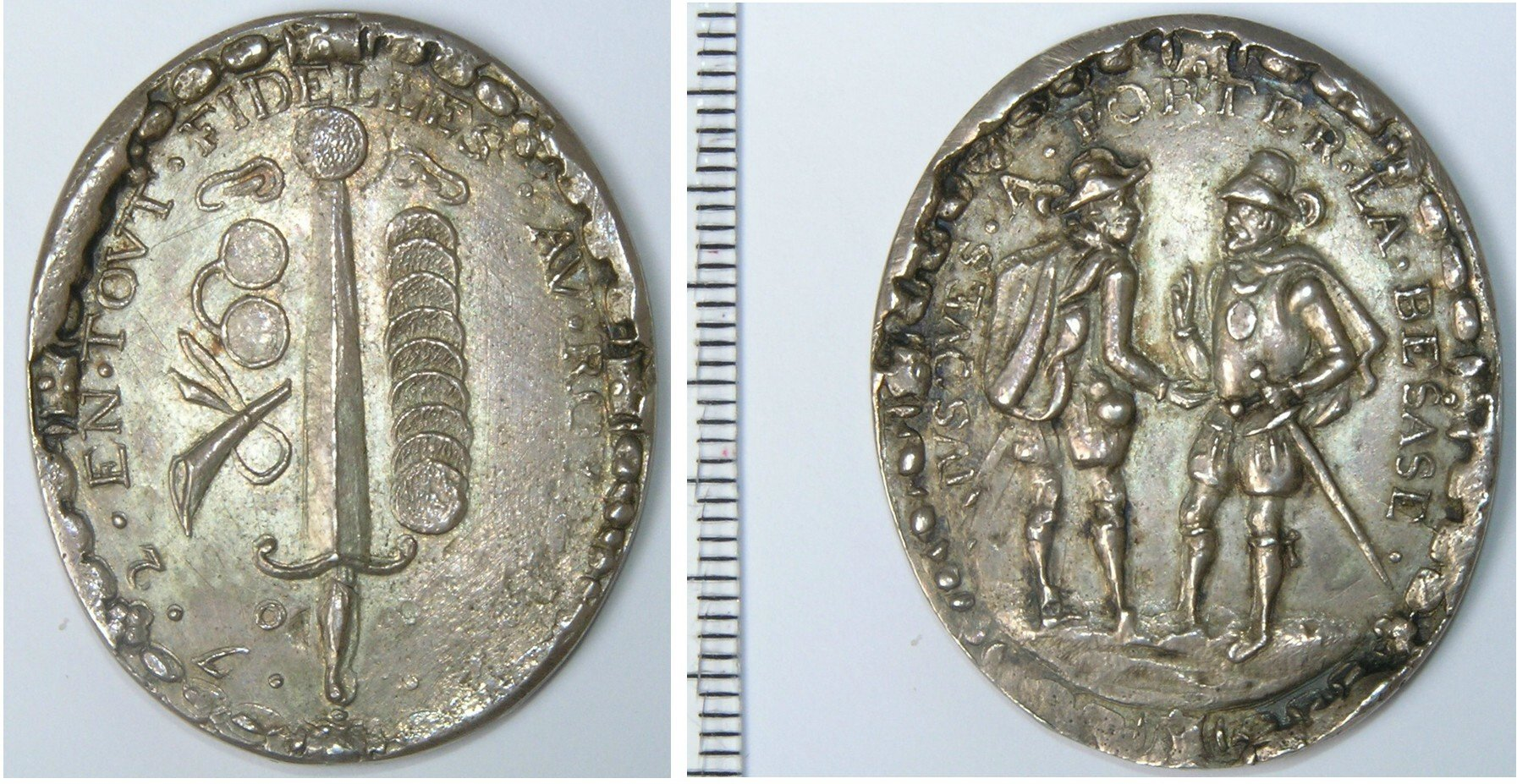
Silver medal commemorating the Capture of Brielle in 1572 by the Sea Beggars

Geuzen medals, Beggars' or Sea Beggars' medals were minted early in the Dutch Revolt and during the first half of the 16th-century Eighty Years' War. During that period, many medals, tokens and jetons with a political message were minted. The earliest Geuzen medals (or tokens) date from the mid-16th century to 1577.

In Dutch, geus (plural geuzen) is a familiar term for the people who revolted in the 16th century against the Spanish king Philip II. The revolt began with the nobility, spreading to the gentry and the common prole. Years later, when war broke out, the title geus (or watergeus) was given to the irregular force of rebels fighting and living in the estuaries of large rivers; the name bosgeus ("forest geus") was given to those living in the woods.

Geus is derived from the French word for beggar, hence the translation of watergeus as "sea beggar". The term "sea beggar" is also used for a land-bound geus.

== Background ==
The Holy Roman Empire was still at war with France when Philip II of Spain succeeded his father, Charles V, Holy Roman Emperor, in 1555. After peace was made, Philip II appointed his half-sister Margaret of Parma as viceroy of the Low Countries and left for Spain. The real power was invested in the three permanent members of the Council of State: Cardinal Granvelle, Viglius and Berlaymont. Nobility such as William of Orange (or William the Silent, stadtholder [steward] of Holland, Zealand and Utrecht) and Lamoral, Count of Egmont, (stadthouder of Flandres) were members of the council, but were unhappy with their loss of power to Granvelle and because Spanish troops remained in the Low Countries after the peace with France. Following a French example, they instituted a Ligue: a coalition of the high nobility. The Ligue's activity resulted in the departure of Spanish troops in 1564 and, shortly thereafter, Granvelle's retirement.

Members of the lower nobility, who had been impoverished in previous decades (like the common people in the southern parts of the Low Countries) united in the 1565 Compromis; their political program sought relief from the Counter-Reformation. In early April 1566, 400 members of the Compromis united in Brussels. On April 5, led by Hendrick van Brederode and Ludwig of Nassau, they presented a petition to Margaret (who was alarmed by the large gathering). Berlaymont is reputed to have whispered to her, "Ce ne sont que de gueux" ("They're just beggars").

Three days later, during a banquet at the palace of the earl of Culemborg, the pejorative geus was chosen as a badge of honour for their group. They decided to adopt a costume incorporating mendicant symbols, such as beggars' bowls and flagons. This was less an eccentricity of the low nobility than the popular tradition in reversing roles, as at carnival time. A dress code, with beggars' bowls and flagons and a silver (or gilt) token on a ribbon around the neck indicated their independence and dominance; mockery of the church may also have been a factor.

The lower 16th-century Flemish nobility could be described as successful criminals. When Charles V first visited Spain in 1517 and did not land at the pre-selected spot because of stormy weather, disappointed Flemish nobles marauded and murdered innocent people (according to Alonso de Santa Cruz) and officials withheld the news from Charles. In 1572 William de la Marck, Lord of Lumey (also lower Flemish nobility) took Den Briel for William the Silent; nineteen Catholic clerics were brought to him in Den Briel. After they were tortured, they were hanged; William of Orange had requested leniency toward Catholic clergy.

During the 16th century, beggars frequently required permission from a local municipality or lordship. Permission was sometimes granted only if they wore a small tin (or copper) token, the possible origin of the Geuzen medals.

== Probable first political medal ==
Letters between Granvelle (in Madrid) and his secretary, Morillon (in Brussels) indicate that Jacques Jonghelinck – a master medal maker with a workshop in a buildings in the palace complex in Brussels – made a mould for a small medal in the spring of 1566. Jonghelinck cast medals in lead, tin, copper, silver and gold; tin and copper specimens are now lost, and only a few questionable lead specimens exist). On June 15 Morillon sent a lead specimen to Granvelle, saying that more medals were cast in lead then in the other metals; a medal for poor people "affin peult-estre gue les Geutz demeurent en leur qualité" ("perhaps the quality [of the medals] is in line with the standing of the Geuzen").

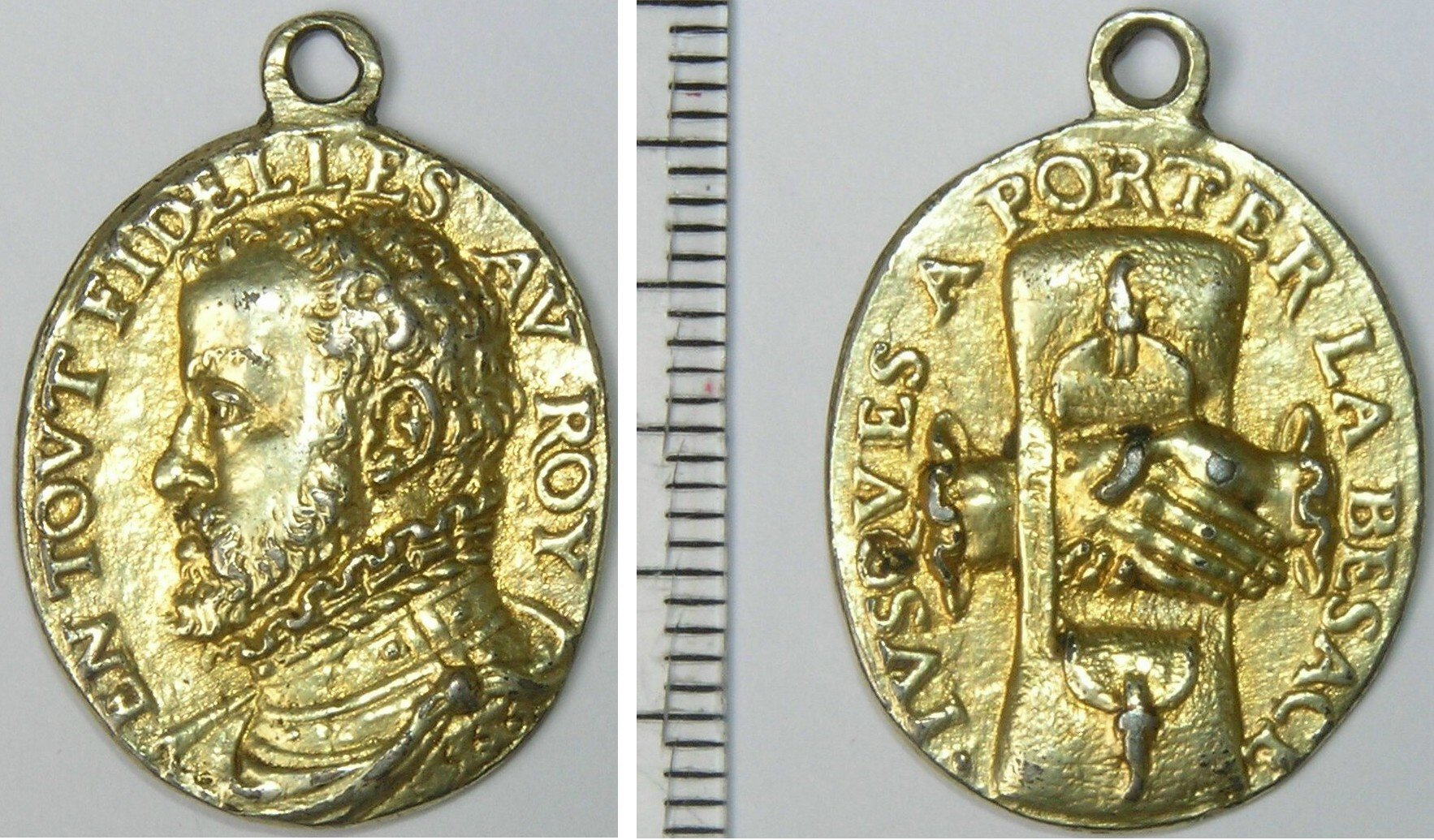
Geuzen medal by Jacques Jonghelinck, cast silver, original gilt, 1566; possibly the first Geuzen medal

The medal is described in part I of Gerard van Loon's book, Beschrijving der Nederlandse Historipenningen ... (1713–1731), and has the collectors reference vL.I 85/84.5. It is classified as rare to very rare. The medal is small, only 1 inch (25 mm) (not counting the eyelet). It shows the bust of Philip II, with "1566" on its cut and the text "EN TOVT FIDELLES AV ROY" ("In everything loyal to the king"); on the reverse side is a beggar's sack, hands and the text, "IVSQVES A PORTER LA BESACE" ("even condemned to a beggar's level"). The medal was worn on the breast with a ribbon around the neck. Morillon notes that Jonghelinck's neighbouring tourneur (a master furniture maker) turned small wooden bowls which women hung from their ears; original specimens are now unknown. Pictures sometimes show the nobility wearing model beggar's bowls and flasks, fastened to the same ribbon. On the reverse side of the medal, some wear is visible due to contact with breast armour.

Of this type of medal, about half the known specimens' eyelets are broken off. This is due to a late 17th- and 18th-century fashion in which a medal with an eyelet was considered less attractive in a collector's cabinet. Early in the 17th century, when it became clear that the Dutch would win the Eighty Years' War, there was a growing demand for Geuzen medals. Jonghelinck's medal was copied in silver, slightly larger and sometimes with attached beggar's bowls and flasks.

== Early political medal by unknown medallist ==
Morillon wrote to Granvelle on July 7, 1566, that he got angry at Jonghelinck "because he had broken his first Geuzen medal" (Jonghelinck had probably broken his mould), but he thought that Jonghelinck could reproduce his mould (although he made only a small profit on his first version). The maker of the cast silver, gilt Geuzen medal with collectors reference vL.I 85/84.4 and the qualification "very rare" is unknown.

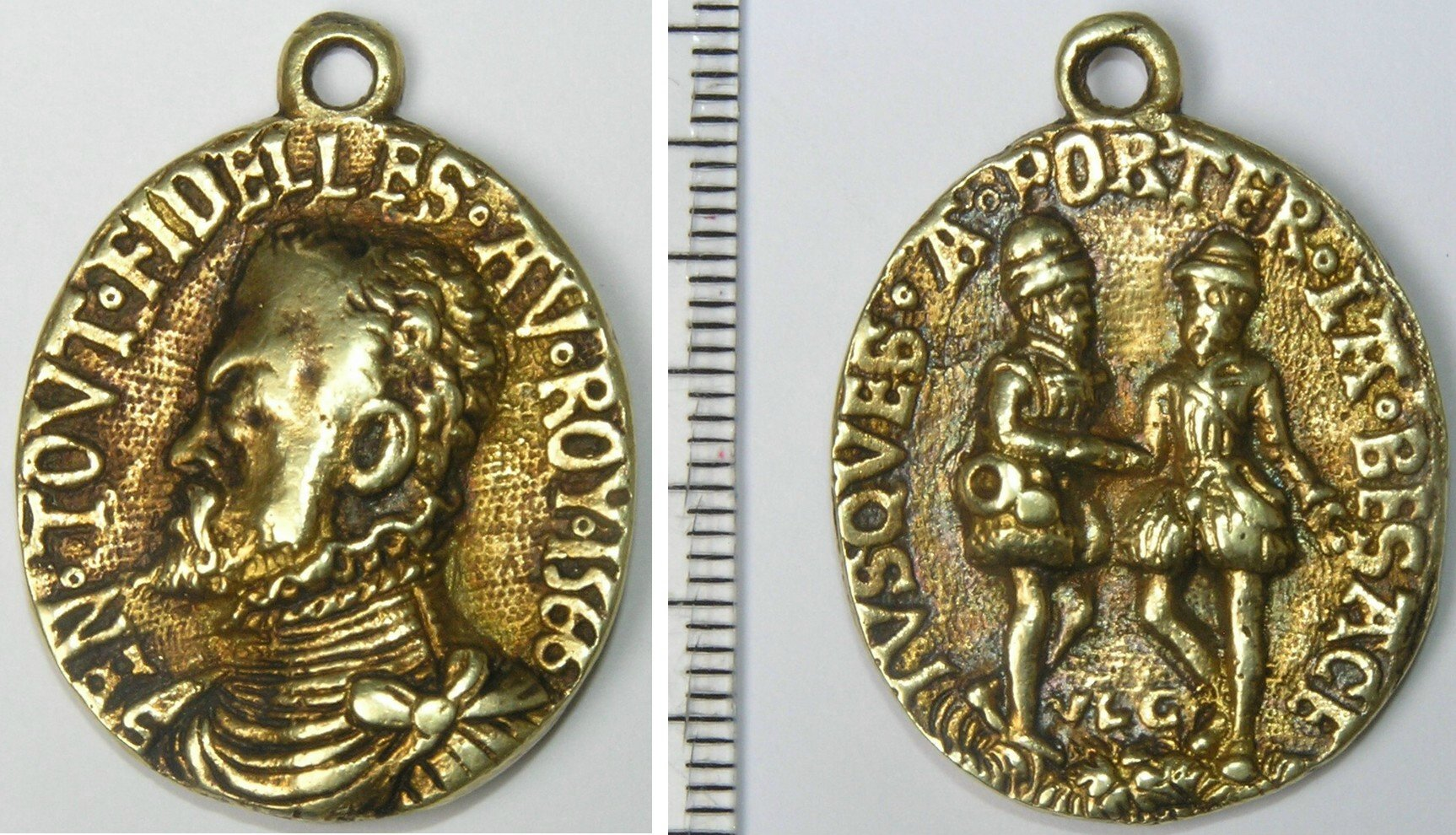
Geuzen medal, cast silver, original gilt, 1566, maker unknown

The text is nearly identical to the Jonghelinck medal, with the addition of "1566" and hollow points between the words. The medal is slightly larger than the first one. The reverse has no beggar's bag, but two nobles shaking hands. The left figure has a beggar's bowl and flask on his hip. Between the nobles' feet is a monogram, probably "VLG" ("Vive le Geux", or a reference to the medal-maker). The medal may have been shaped by Jonghelinck or a medal-maker; its style and production method are similar, but the medal date may not be 1566. The other noble does not yet wear a Geuzen medal on a ribbon, found on a 1572 medal. The Beeldenstorm began on August 16, 1566, in Steenvoorde, and this medal probably dates from the summer of 1566 (after July 7 and before the end of August).

A gold Geuzen medal reportedly belonged to Philip de Montmorency, Count of Horne, who was executed by the Duke of Alba in 1568. Nearly identical to Jonghelinck's medal, it has points inserted between the words of the text.

Hoorne's gold medal, illustrated in G. van der Meer's article on page 92 of the May-June 1980 issue of de Beeldenaar

== "Little lobster" medal ==
The half-moon Geuzen medal (c. 1570) is also called the "half-moon of Boisot" because the Sea Beggars, commanded by Boisot, wore the medal on their hats during the 1574 relief of Leiden. The "little lobster" emblem, between "...PIT" and "DEL...", is the privy mark (huismerk) of the medal-maker.

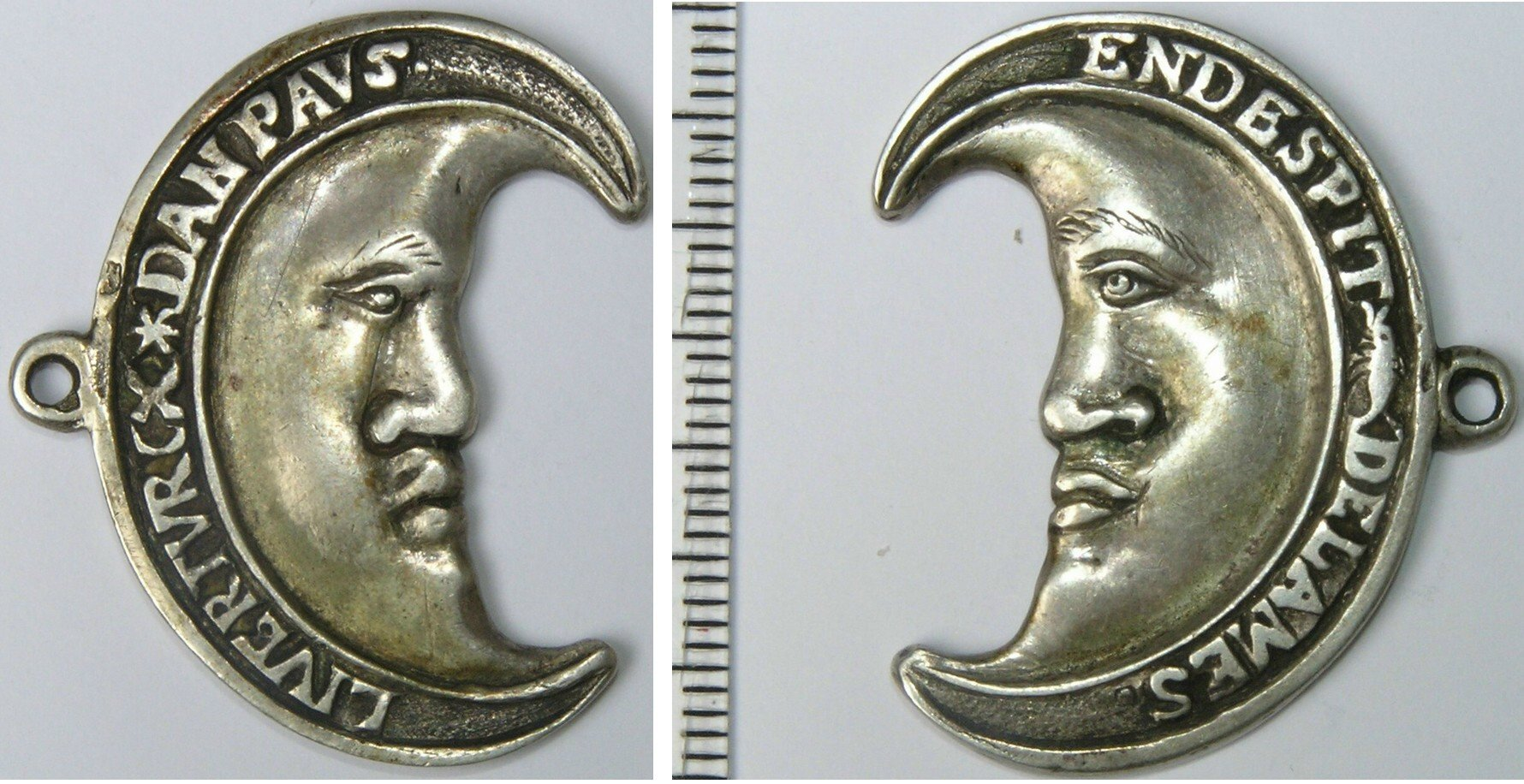
Geuzen medal, cast silver, tooled, c. 1570

The medal's text reads, "Liever Turks dan Paaps" ("Better Turkish than Papist") and "En DESPIT DE LA MES" ('In spite of the Mass'). Wearing half moons was already in practice in and around Antwerp by attendants of “hagepreken”, open-air sermons, by Herman Modet. Modet popularized the slogan “Liever Turks dan paaps” (“Rather Turkish than Papist”). The phrases are meant to express a solidarity with the Turks who were also fighting the Habsburgs at that time, as well as opposition to the Catholic pope.

These medals were also worn by the Sea Beggars at the capture of Den Briel in 1572. Some time later Modet became parson with the Watergeuzen and reintroduced wearing half moons, where in other places they had gone out of fashion.

In the Stedelijk Museum De Lakenhal in Leiden this medal is shown in a display on city history. There is a little silver ring attached to the eyelet, indicating that it was probably worn on a silver chain at some time. The Rijksmuseum of Amsterdam also possesses a "half moon". It is dated to 1574, cast in silver and roughly tooled.

== 1572 token ==
The Duke of Alba, in his effort to strengthen the power of King Phillip II in the Low Countries, wanted to eliminate the bede (regular pleas for money by the state; this could only be done with taxation. The duke wanted to introduce a one-time, one-percent tax on property in 1569, and a regular five-percent tax on property sales a few years later; he wanted a 10-percent sales tax as a VAT. The latter (known as the "tiende penning") was vigorously opposed, and the duke postponed it for two years. William of Orange (an opponent) was seen as a hero, and an unknown medal maker cast a silver token.

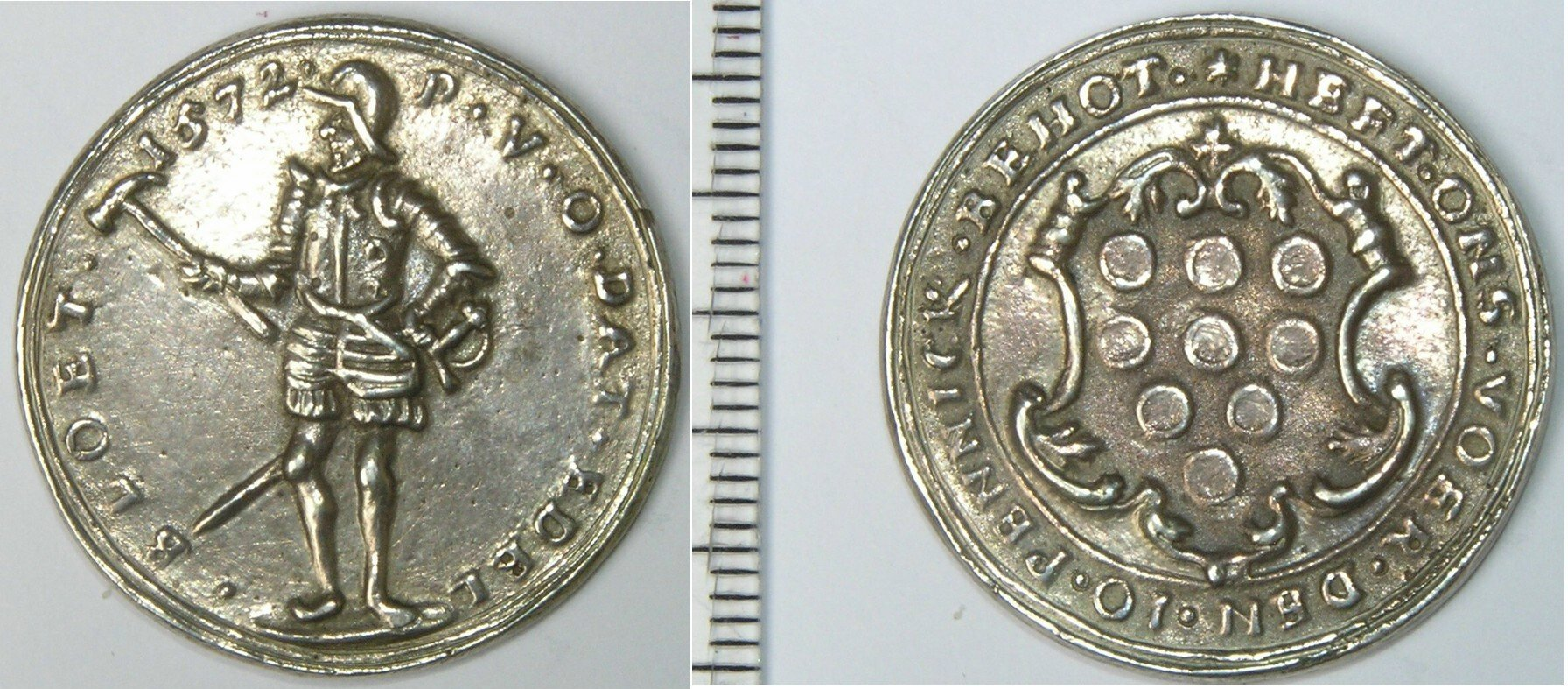
Tiende penning token, cast silver, 1572, maker unknown

The 28-millimetre (1.1 in) token depicts William of Orange in harness, with sword and battle hammer. The text reads, "P.V.O" or "Prince of Orange" and "Dat Edel Bloet" ("that noble blood"). On the reverse, nine penningen are shown on a coat of arms with the text "Heft Ons Voer Den 10 Penninck Behot" ("has guarded us against the 10th penny"). This cast-silver token has the collectors reference vL.I 157/155.1 and the qualification "very rare"; more frequently, it is found with a larger diameter and struck rather than cast. Rare by the 17th century, the token was reissued due to growing demand from collectors and struck because casting was obsolete.

== 1572 political medal ==
In 1572, taxation on the tiende penning was prohibited and the Sea Beggars seized Den Briel for the Prince of Orange. Vlissingen, Veere and Enkhuizen sided with the prince; a medal was struck on a cast-silver plate (originally without an eyelet), collectors reference vL.I 148/145 with the qualification "extremely rare".

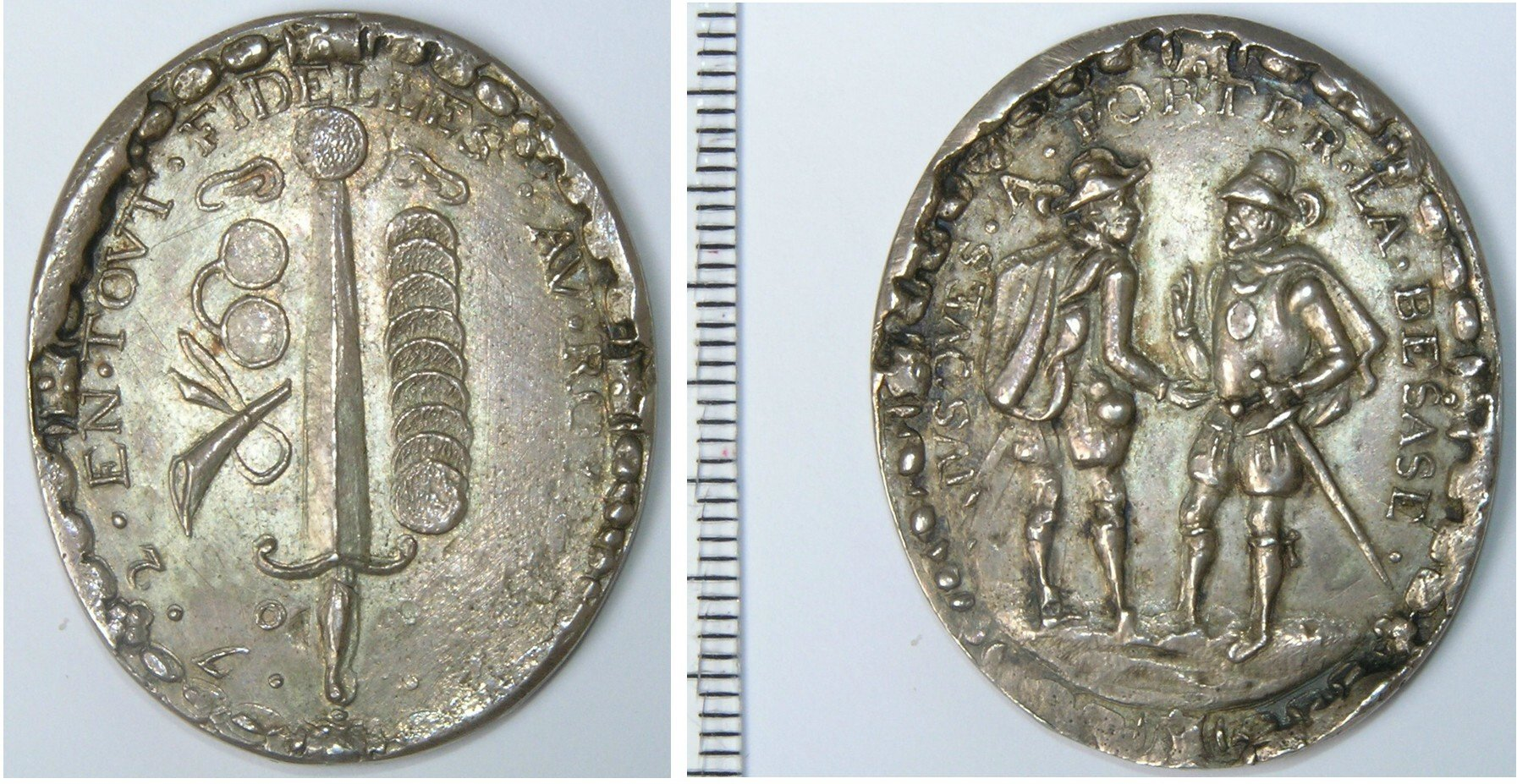
Geuzen medal struck on a small cast-silver plate, 1572, maker unknown

On the medal, 38.5 millimetres (1.52 in) high, a sword with a penning on top is between two ears; on the left are spectacles and a flute, and on the right are nine penningen. The text reads, "En Tovt Fidelles Av Roy 1572" (the date is difficult to read). The reverse shows two nobles, one with a beggar's bowl and flask and the other with a large Geuzen medal; the text reads, "Ivsqves a Porter La Besase"”. The medal was reissued in the 17th century, struck on rolled silver plate. The symbolic "ears" refer to the Duke of Alba, and the spectacles are associated with the seizure of Den Briel (Dutch bril, "spectacles"). The fierce fighting lasted for nine years before Philip II was no longer acknowledged as sovereign in 1581.

== 1577 edict ==
After the pacification of Ghent, accepted by John of Austria, Jacques Jonghelinck produced a silver commemorative medal for casting in large numbers; the reference code is vL.I 243/230.

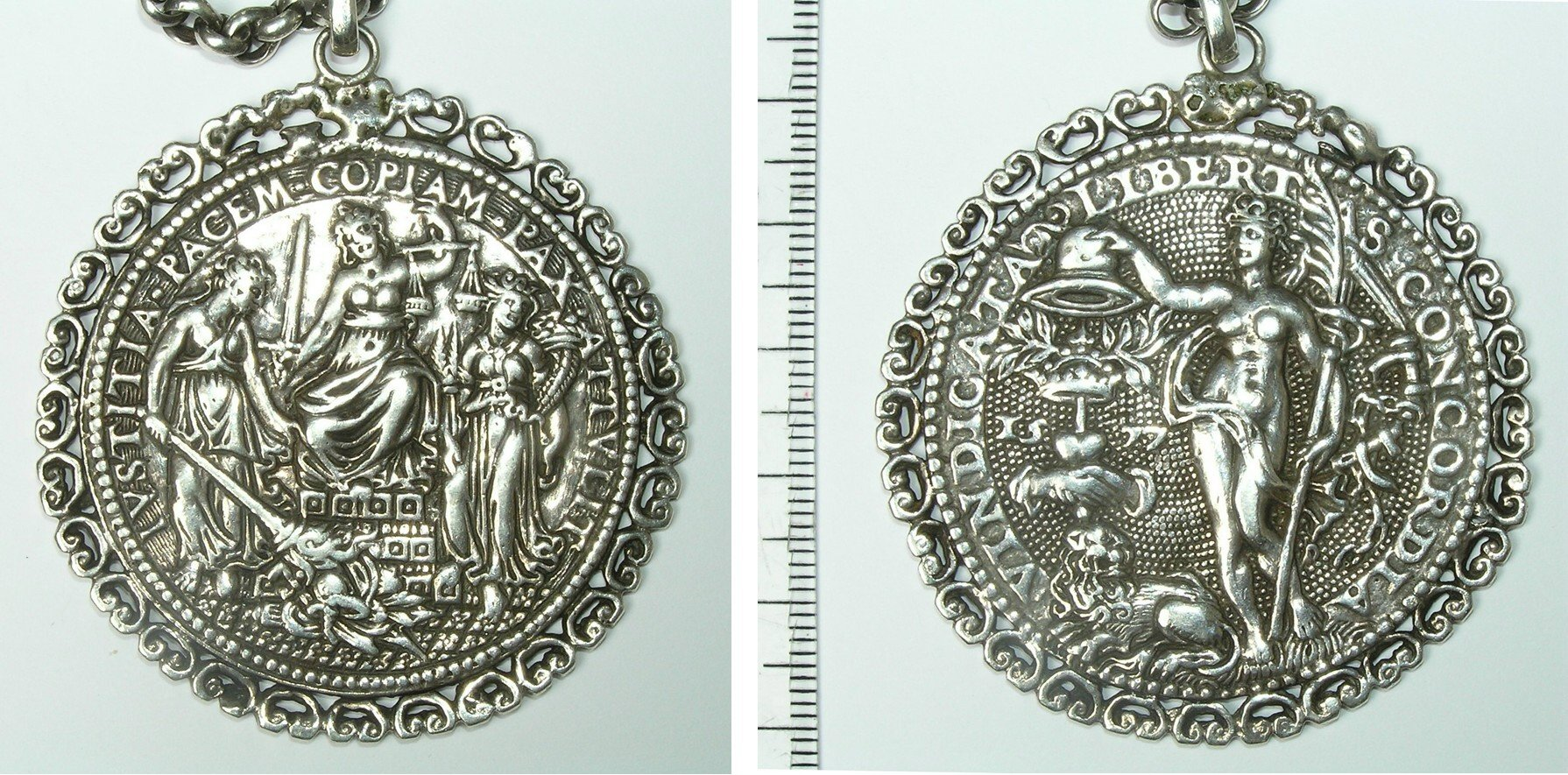
1577 medal, silver, cast by Jonghelinck

Almost all the medals have an ornate border of vuurslagen (flint strikers) and an eyelet, or a spot where the eyelet is broken off. Jonghelinck tried to maximise his profit by minimising silver in the casting process, and many medals have small holes due to thin casting.

== Bowl and flask attachments ==
It became clear around 1600 that the northern part of the Low Countries would win the war against Spain, and the number of Geuzen medals increased; with accompanying prosperity, there was increased demand for the medals. The issues from 1566 to 1572 were manifold-copied by striking (or engraving) on rolled silver plate, rather than by casting. Early in the 17th century, it became fashionable to attach small beggars' bowls and flasks to medals. Around 1700, Jonghelinck's Geuzen medal was the most frequently struck (with one beggars' bowl and two flasks).
