= Heinrich Bitter =

Bohemian diplomat

Heinrich Bitter (fl. 1620) was an ambassador of the Bohemian estates in the Holy Roman Empire to the Ottoman Empire during the Thirty Years' War. He visited the Ottomans in Constantinople in January 1620, seeking support for the Bohemian cause against the Holy Roman Emperor.
