= Phoenician settlement of North Africa =

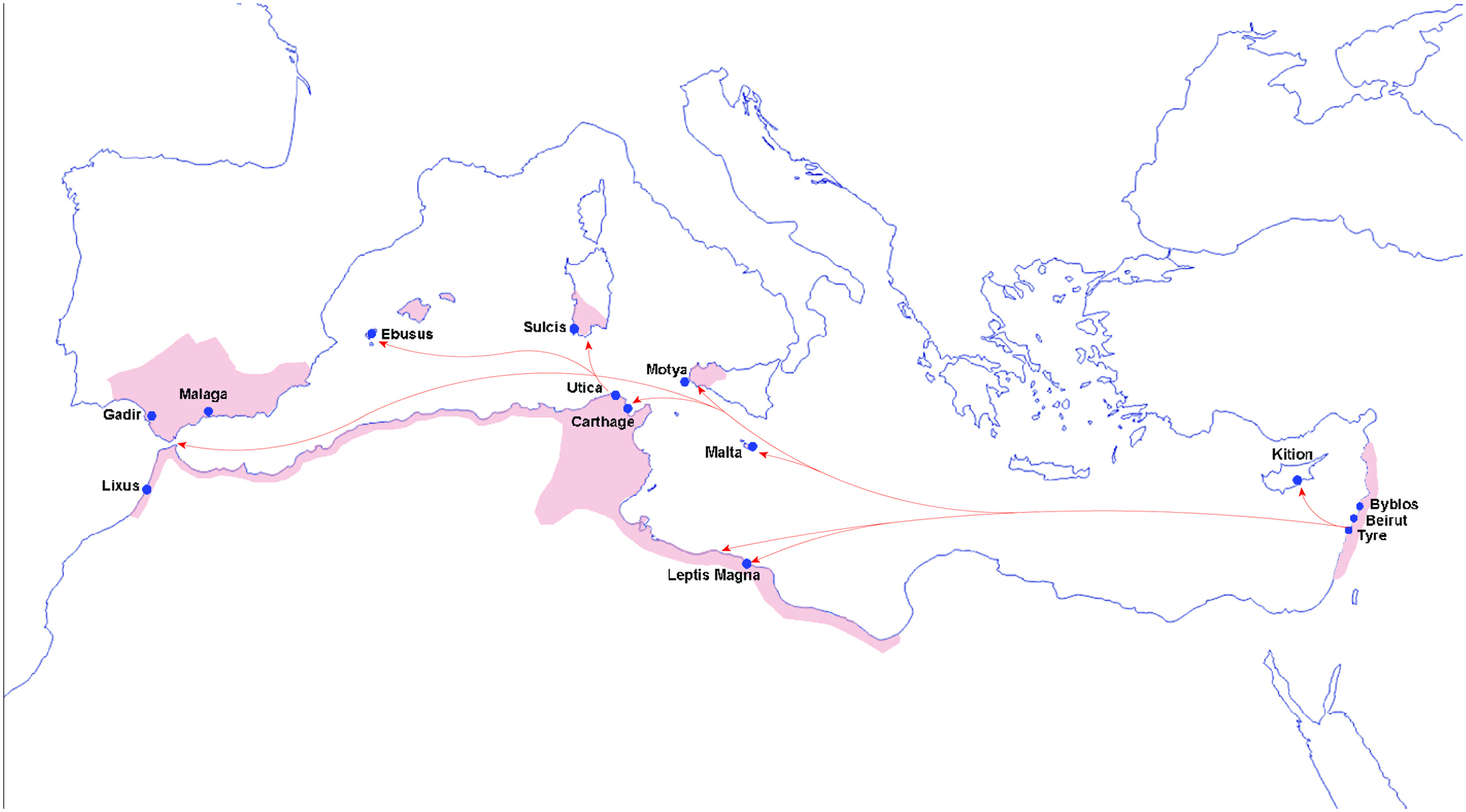
Phoenician settlements and trade routes across the Mediterranean starting from around 800 BC.

Phoenicians settled in the Maghreb region of North Africa, encompassing present-day Algeria, Libya, Morocco and Tunisia, from their homeland of Phoenicia in the Levant region, including present-day Lebanon, Northern Israel, and the Syrian Coast, in the 1st millennium BC.

== History ==
=== Causes ===
The Phoenicians originated in the Northern Levant sometime circa 1800 BC and emigrated to North Africa around 900 BC. The causes of Phoenician emigration to North Africa as far as the Atlantic coast are debated, but could include overpopulation in the Levant and economic opportunities and precious metals in North Africa. These precious metals in particular may have been given up to the Assyrian Empire as they expanded into the Phoenician homeland in the Levant, though whether this caused the Phoenicians to need to search for more through expansion into Northern Africa has been disputed.

=== Immigration ===
The first Phoenician settlers immigrated to North Africa around 900 BC as traders and merchants, mainly from Tyre and Sidon in modern-day Lebanon. They settled predominantly in what is now Tunisia, but they also established over 300 colonies and settlements in the lands currently part of modern Algeria and Morocco. These included the settlements of Thapsus, Leptis and Hadrumetum, Tunis, Carthage, Utica, Hippo, Igilgili (Jijel), Icosium (Algiers), Iol (Cherchell), Gunugu (Gouraya), Cartennae (Ténès), Tingi (Tangier), Lixus (Larache), Mogador (Essaouira) and Thymiateria (Mehdya). These settlements displaced the local peoples, and caused the importance of the Greek culture and language to diminish in importance west of Tripoli. The descendants of the Phoenician settlers in Ancient Carthage came to be known as the Punic people. From the 8th century BC, most inhabitants of present-day Tunisia were Punic.

== Continuity ==
In the late seventh and early sixth centuries BC, Phoenician settlements in Northern Africa grew politically distant from Phoenicia. In particular, the city of Carthage became an independent entity, known as the Punics and expanded control over the western Maghreb and Europe. Evidence from Sicily shows that some western Phoenicians themselves may have identified as under the term "Phoinix", or 𐤊𐤍𐤏𐤍𐤌 (knʿnm, "Canaanites").

=== Genetic impact ===
1 in 17 men in coastal North Africa and Southern Europe have a Phoenician paternal ancestor, according to a 2008 study. In 2025, a study demonstrated that the Carthaginians, who spoke a Phoenician language, did not predominantly have Phoenician genetics. Two scenarios are possible: Phoenician settlers may have mixed with Greek colonies in North Africa during the founding period of Magna Graecia (10th-9th century BCE), gaining cultural dominance; or an intermediate ethnogenesis may have occurred at the end of the 2nd millennium BCE in the Aegean sea – for example in Cyprus – between Phoenician and local merchants, which produced the founding population of Carthage.

== Primary sources ==
There is relatively little information about the Phoenician migration into North Africa when compared to Phoenician migration into other areas. The majority of primary sources detailing the settlements are Greece or Roman in origin and, as of the early 2020s, few archeological sites have been excavated.
