= Spanish relations with the Barbary Coast =

In Spanish history, the region known as the Barbary Coast held great importance as a host territory for the Moriscos after their expulsion of the Moriscos from Spain, and for a long time the Barbary Coast became a stronghold of piracy that particularly ravaged the Spanish Mediterranean coast.

== Background ==
During the Reconquista the Castile turned Seville (conquered in 1248) into a major port and an arsenal. With the assistance of foreign knights they seized Algeciras. The Muslims lost control of the strait. Castile began the conquest of the Emirate of Granada which in turn was supported by North African tribes that supplied weapons, horses, ammunition, and grain, while offering refuge to fugitives. In return, they received silk, fruits, ceramics, and slaves from Granada.

After Granada fell Ferdinand the Catholic Spain then devised an African policy, establishing a series of presidios (a type of fortification against attacks) in port cities along the African coast. Spain launched several expeditions to fight Barbary piracy and capture important strongholds in North Africa. In 1497, Melilla was taken—then a safe haven for Turkish and Algerian pirates who plundered the southern and eastern Spanish coasts, places where they enjoyed the support of the Moriscos. In 1506, the fortified town of Cazaza—near Melilla on the Tres Forcas peninsula—was captured. However, it was lost in 1536 due to the treason of some of the convicts stationed as its garrison. Also in 1497, and departing from Sicily, the Spaniards occupied the island of Gelves (Djerba). This occupation did not last long because, with the outbreak of the Second Italian War in 1500, the island was abandoned.

== Spanish Pressure ==
In 1505, departing from Málaga, the Spanish seized Mazalquivir, a town near Orán. An attempt to capture Orán in June 1507 failed. From 1508 to 1522, the Castilians occupied the Peñón de Vélez de la Gomera, despite this territory lying within the Portuguese zone; it was lost later and subsequently fell into the hands of Barbarossa, the Turkish Bey of Algiers. In 1509, a fleet and army sailing from Cartagena wrested the city of Orán from the Zayyanid dynasty. In 1510, Béjaïa and Tripoli were taken, while the cities of Tunis and Algiers offered vassalage (paying tribute) to the Catholic King. However, in 1510 the Spanish armies could not capture Djerba.

Emperor Charles V continued pressing the offensive on Barbary strongholds, from Melilla to Tripoli. In 1535, the expedition of Charles V seized La Goletta for Spain and took Tunis, which he ceded to his vassal King Muley Hacen. The pirate activities of Barbarossa, in the service of Ottoman Emperor Suleiman the Magnificent, multiplied across the Mediterranean with great success. Another attempt by Charles V to take Algiers, in 1541, failed, and the Mediterranean remained effectively an Ottoman sea until the Battle of Lepanto (1571). Tripoli held out until 1551, when it fell to Barbarossa and Dragut.

Spain lost Tunis to the Ottoman Empire in 1569 and finally in 1574.

== Expulsion of the Moriscos ==
After the Christian victory over the Ottomans at Lepanto (1571), Christians and Muslims continued to fight at sea. In the 17th century, Turkish-Barbary pirates, who included Moriscos expelled from Spain and a large number of Christian renegades, adopted European shipbuilding and armament methods. They expanded their corsair activities to the Atlantic, even reaching as far as Iceland during their raids.

During the reigns of Philip III and Philip IV, the Moriscos were especially active in piracy. The Republic of Salé, for example, was governed by Barbary pirates, who exploited the knowledge the recently arrived Moriscos had of the Spanish coasts to ravage the Spanish Levante for much of the 17th century.

In 1614, the Spanish captured La Mámora (now Mehdya). The decision to conquer it arose from the campaign against piracy along the Moroccan coast, which had already led to the capture of Larache (1610). This was in response to negotiations between the Dutch and the Saadi dynasty to occupy the port and more easily harass the Spanish treasure fleet, despite the ongoing Twelve Years' Truce. Renamed "San Miguel de Ultramar," the fortress remained under Spanish control for 67 years, until it was taken in 1681 by the Alaouite Sultan Isma’il of Morocco.

== Seventeenth Century ==
In 1617, Turkish-Barbary pirates began striking northwestern Spain (Galicia), attacking the Vigo Estuary and sacking and burning Cangas. Throughout the entire century, they threatened maritime trade and coastal villages, seizing inhabitants and damaging fishing operations. Around 1621, the Spanish formed a fleet to defend against Barbary corsairs and the Dutch, but it barely achieved its goal.

In 1631 there was an abortive attempt by the Republic of Salé to go under Spanish protection.
