= USS Barnegat (AVP-10) =

Tender of the United States Navy

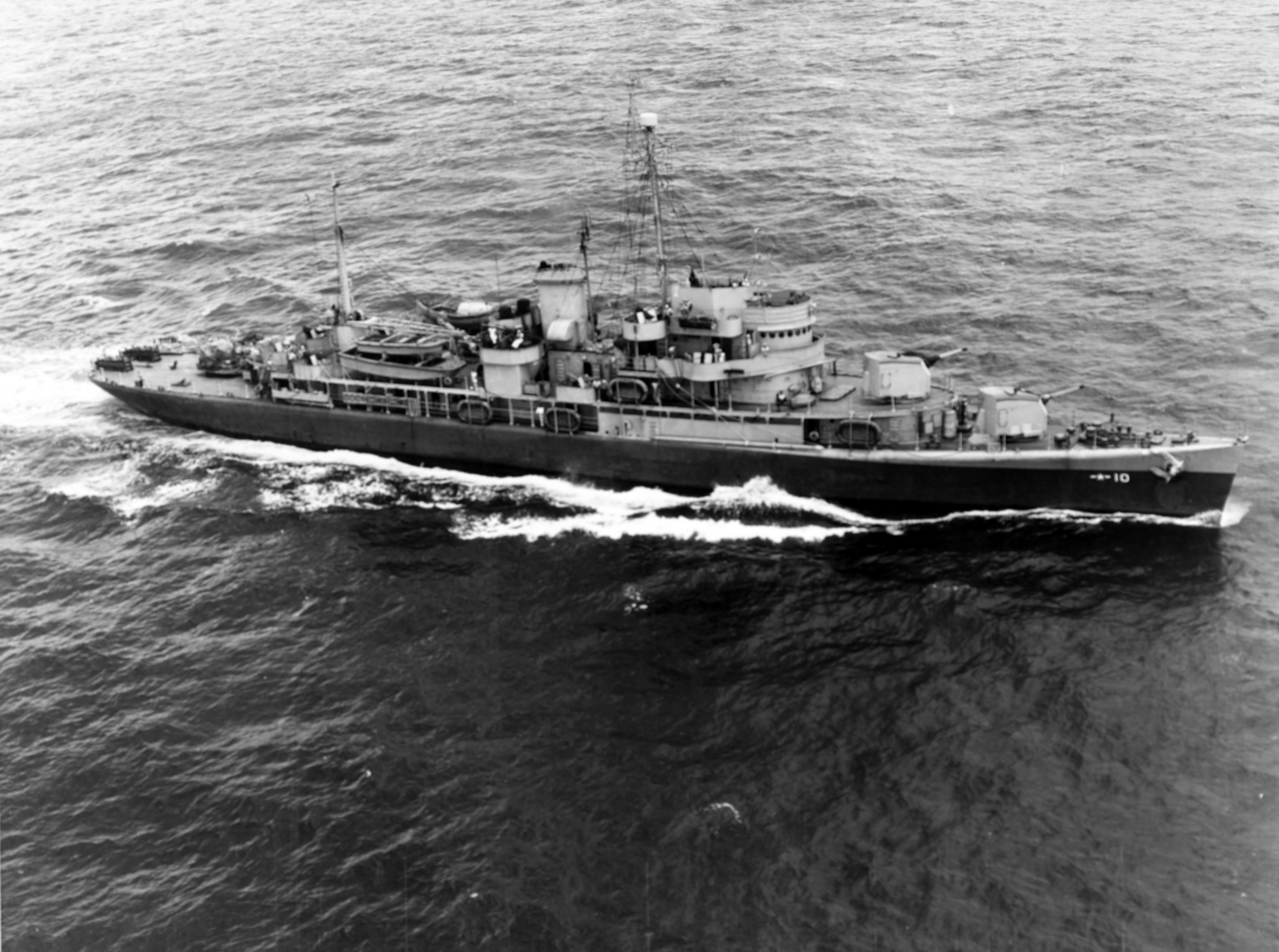
- USS Barnegat (AVP-10) on 4 April 1944

History

United States
- Name: USS Barnegat (AVP-10)
- Namesake: Barnegat Bay in Ocean County, New Jersey
- Builder: Puget Sound Navy Yard, Bremerton, Washington
- Laid down: 27 October 1939
- Launched: 23 May 1941
- Sponsored by: Mrs. Lucien F. Kimball
- Commissioned: 3 July 1941
- Decommissioned: 17 May 1946
- Stricken: 23 May 1958
- Honors and awards: One battle star for her World War II service
- Fate: Sold 1962; Served as Greek commercial cruise ship Kentavros; Scrapped 1986

General characteristics
- Class & type: Barnegat-class small seaplane tender
- Displacement: 1,766 tons (light); 2,750 tons (full load)
- Length: 311 ft 8 in (95.00 m)
- Beam: 41 ft 1 in (12.52 m)
- Draught: 13 ft 6 in (4.11 m)
- Installed power: 6,000 horsepower (4.48 megawatts)
- Propulsion: Diesel engines, two shafts
- Speed: 18.6 knots (34.4 km/h)
- Complement: 215 (ship's company); 367 (including aviation unit)
- Sensors & processing systems: Sonar
- Armament: As built: 2 x single 5 in (130 mm) 38-caliber dual-purpose gun mounts; 4 × .50-caliber (12.7 mm) machine guns; Later: 1 x single 5-inch (127 mm) 38-caliber dual-purpose gun mount; 1 × quad 40-mm antiaircraft gun mount; 2 × dual 40-mm antiaircraft gun mounts; 4 × dual 20-mm antiaircraft gun mounts; 2 × depth charge tracks
- Aviation facilities: Supplies, spare parts, repairs, and berthing for one seaplane squadron; 80,000 US gallons (300,000 L) aviation fuel

The second USS Barnegat (AVP-10), in commission from 1941 to 1946, was the lead ship of her class of small seaplane tenders built for the United States Navy just before and during World War II. She was the second U.S. Navy ship to bear that name.

After the end of her U.S. Navy career, the former Barnegat operated as the Greek cruise ship MV Kentavros from 1962, and finally was scrapped in 1986.

== Early career ==
Barnegat was laid down on 27 October 1939 at Bremerton, Washington, by the Puget Sound Navy Yard and launched on 23 May 1941, sponsored by Mrs. Lucien F. Kimball. Barnegat was commissioned on 3 July 1941.

For the next three months, Barnegat remained at Puget Sound, conducting sea trials and testing equipment, such as her large aircraft handling crane. The "years of operation of patrol planes in the Fleet and the increasingly important role played by these planes" had also shown that the Lapwing-class converted minesweepers fell "far short of the characteristics needed" for mobile tenders to operate patrol planes "where shore facilities were not available". This meant specifications that included a draft that would "permit entrance into the greater number of small harbors which might be suitable for seaplane anchorages", the ability to tend a 12-plane patrol squadron, high maneuverability, and the ability to contribute to her own defense.

Her trials completed by mid-October 1941, Barnegat stood out of Seattle, Washington, on 15 October 1941 and, later that afternoon, retrieved her assigned aircraft, a Curtiss SOC-1 Seagull floatplane, from Naval Air Station Seattle. On 16 October 1941, Barnegat proceeded south and reached the Mare Island Navy Yard in Vallejo, California, on 19 October 1941. There, she loaded ammunition before sailing for the United States East Coast on 22 October 1941. Barnegat called at Acapulco, Mexico, from 27 October 1941 to 29 October 1941 and then sailed for Panama, transiting the Panama Canal on 2 November 1941. After pausing briefly at Hampton Roads, Virginia, en route, she reached the Boston Navy Yard at Boston, Massachusetts, on 12 November 1941. More tests and trials kept Barnegat busy in the local operating area into the early spring of 1942. By then, the United States had entered World War II as a full partner in the Allied cause.

== World War II ==
=== North Atlantic operations May–November 1942 ===
Underway from the Boston Navy Yard on 1 May 1942, Barnegat transited the Cape Cod Canal later that day, anchoring for the evening in Buzzard's Bay on the Massachusetts coast. From there, she sailed to Newport, Rhode Island, and moored at the Naval Torpedo Station Newport at Newport on the morning of 2 May 1942 to take on a dozen Mark XIII aerial torpedoes before she headed on to Naval Air Station, Quonset Point, Rhode Island, where she loaded equipment and stores for Patrol Squadron 73 (VP-73). on 4 May 1942, Barnegat embarked the squadron's five officers and 117 enlisted men and put to sea that afternoon, bound for Iceland. Along the way, she escorted the steamer SS Cherokee to the Sambro Lightship and there turned over her charge to a Royal Canadian Navy escort. Barnegat stopped at Argentia, Newfoundland, from 7 May 1942 to 9 May 1942, and then resumed her voyage to Iceland. She arrived in Reykjavík, Iceland, late on 13 May 1942. On 14 May 1942, she moored alongside seaplane tender USS Belknap (AVD-8) and unloaded VP-73's gear. On 16 May 1942, Barnegat arrived at the Fleet Air Base at Skagafjörður, Iceland, her base of operations for most of the next three months.

There she provided not only tender services but salvage and logistic support as well. Between 20 June 1942 and 22 June 1942, she recovered gear from a Consolidated PBY-5A Catalina which had been shot down at Kossandr Beach by “friendly fire” from ships in Convoy UR 29. After an interruption to locate and salvage a barge and its valuable cargo of gasoline, she completed the task on 24 June 1942. While based at Skagafjörður, Barnegat also transferred aviation gasoline from tankers to a variety of ships, from Skagafjörður to Hvalfjordur, Iceland, supplying heavy cruisers USS Tuscaloosa (CA-37) and USS Wichita (CA-45), battleship USS Washington (BB-56), and British aircraft carrier HMS Victorious (R38) in that fashion. She also supplied diesel fuel to the destroyer tender USS Melville (AD-2). Later, on 14 August 1942, she got underway from Skagafjörður to salvage a German Focke-Wulf Fw 200 Condor reconnaissance plane that had been shot down by a United States Army fighter from Gaetta Light. At the scene, Barnegat recovered some flotsam before returning to her moorings. On 5 September 1942, Barnegat's tour in Icelandic waters took on a more Allied flavor as she sailed for three weeks of duty servicing Norwegian Northrop N3PB twin-float seaplane patrol bombers of the Royal Norwegian Naval Air Force's No. 330 Squadron based at Akureyri, Iceland, support evolutions aided by a Norwegian-speaking member of the Ship's company who served as interpreter.

On 24 October 1942, Barnegat received orders to transport VP-73 to Derry, Northern Ireland. During the passage, Barnegat encountered heavy seas and, at 15:41 on 26 October 1942, took a "rapid, heavy roll to starboard" while efforts were underway topside to secure depth charges that had come adrift on deck. A torrent of water cascaded across the fantail and swept Ensign George V. Grabosky and two sailors over the side. Barnegat herself had to try to recover her drifting men, since the stiff gale precluded the lowering of a boat. Men on board worked lifelines and tended knotted lines, grapnels, and lifebuoys, as she struggled against the elements to maintain proper position for a rescue. The two enlisted men finally were recovered, but Ensign Grabosky was not found. On 27 October 1942, Barnegat arrived at Lissahally, Ireland, where found another set of sailing orders waiting: She was to participate in Operation Torch, the Allied landings in French North Africa. She got underway again on 29 October 1942 and steamed with British Convoy WS 24 until rendezvousing with Task Force (TF) 34 and Convoy UGF 1.

=== North African operations November–December 1942 ===
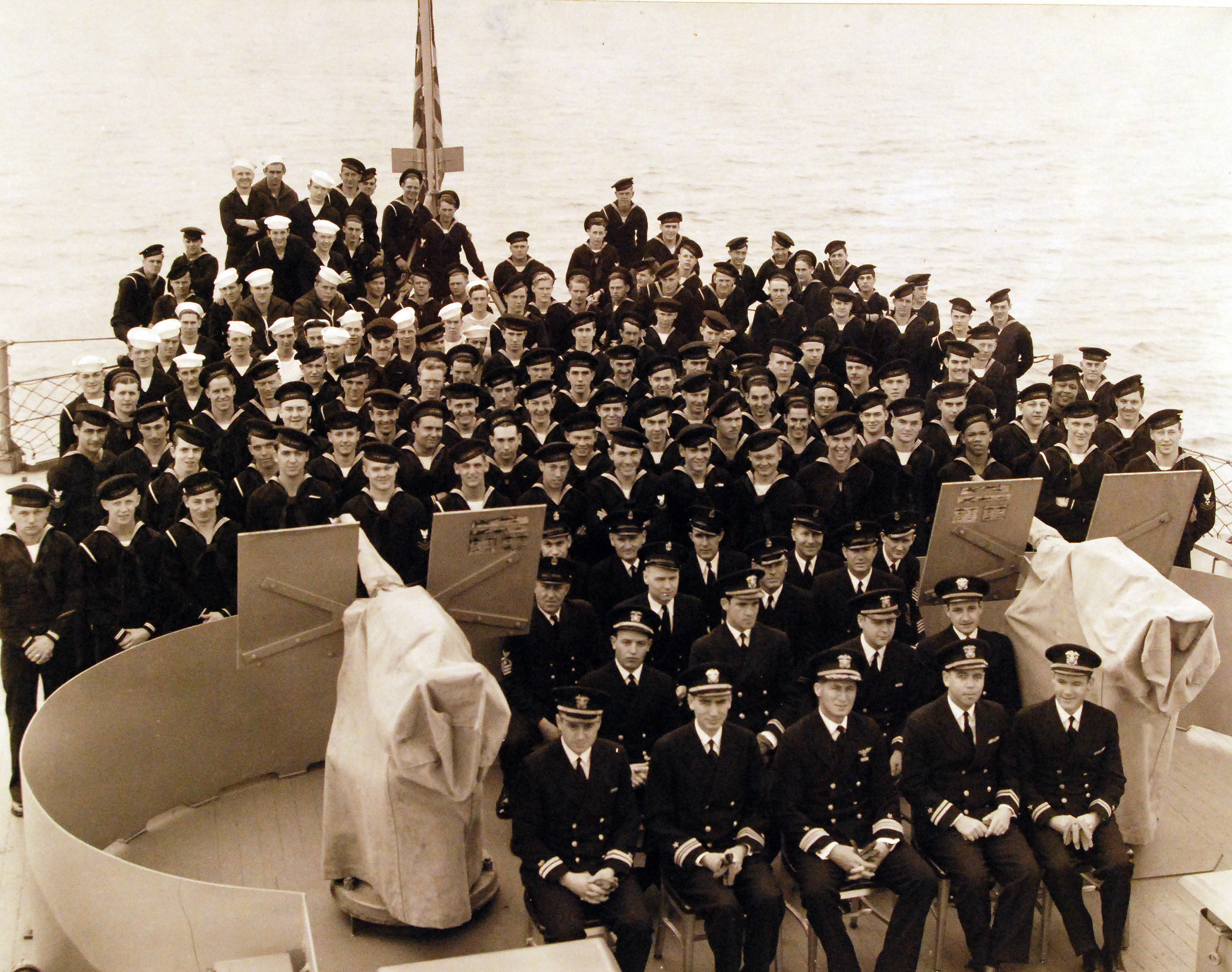
Officers and crew of Barnegat

Early on 7 November 1942, Barnegat joined the task force, took her assigned station in Task Group (TG) 34.8 (the Northern Attack Group), and arrived off Mehedia, French Morocco, that same evening. Assigned to antisubmarine patrol and escort, Barnegat took up station inshore of six transports and two cargo ships whose assault troops were already in the boats. At 06:00, nearby destroyers began bombarding their assigned targets to cover the passage of the troops to the beach. Vichy French batteries returned fire within 10 minutes but, later, shifted their aim to the transports, forcing them to move out to sea. At 07:40, soon after the French guns opened fire, Barnegat's guns silenced one of them with 11 rounds. That work done, Barnegat retired seaward to resume screening and antisubmarine duty.

On 9 November 1942, Barnegat received orders to ascend the Wadi Sebou to establish an air base at Port Lyautey, French Morocco. On 10 November 1942, destroyer USS Dallas (DD-199) led steamer SS Contessa up the Wadi Sebou to Port Lyautey, where U.S. Army troops landed and took the nearby airstrip. Barnegat followed on 11 November 1942 after she secured a French pilot and reached her destination by late afternoon. On 12 November 1942, she unloaded VP-73's equipment, setting up Port Lyautey Air Station on the southeastern corner of the airfield. She also established a port directorate and a shipping control office. Later that day, Barnegat radioed VP-73 that the field was ready, and the first plane arrived from Lyeness, England, at 08:00 on 13 November 1942. Within hours, most of VP-73 was in business there, flying their first patrols. Barnegat housed and fed VP-73 until the squadron managed to set up a mess ashore, but VP-73 was self-sufficient by 24 November 1942. On 10 December 1942, Barnegat got underway to transport a detachment of French native troops to Casablanca. She reached her destination early on 11 December 1942 and disembarked the troops.

=== North Atlantic operations December 1942–May 1943 ===
Barnegat received orders to proceed to the United States with Convoy GUF 2A, and she headed homeward on 12 December 1942.

Chronic bad weather plagued the convoy, and it fell to Barnegat to escort three stragglers from Bermuda to New York City. One of them dropped astern on 20 December 1942 and was not seen again, but Barnegat continued on with the steamers SS Examiner and SS Santa Maria. Setting course for the Nantucket Shoals lightship early on 21 December 1942, Barnegat pounded heavily in the head seas on the night of 21–22 December 1942, and sprung seams flooded the sound room and some 5-inch (127 mm) magazine spaces. Ignoring the flooded sound room, additional weight forward apparently giving some advantage in heavy seas, her damage control parties pumped out the magazine spaces.

Releasing Examiner and Santa Maria to a local escort at 23:00 on 23 December 1942, Barnegat then made for the Boston Navy Yard, arriving on 24 December 1942. She spent the rest of 1942 receiving voyage repairs at South Boston, Massachusetts.

After trials and antisubmarine exercises near Casco Bay, Maine, Barnegat sailed on 5 February 1943 for Iceland. Diverted briefly to Argentia on 8 February 1943, she resumed her voyage to Iceland the next morning. Despite cautious steaming through pack ice, she reached Reykjavík on 13 February 1943.

Late in February, Barnegat returned to Boston for repairs to her engines, degaussing gear, and radar. After a brief call at Quonset Point, she loaded aviation gasoline for Argentia at Boston on 8 March 1943. Upon completion of this cargo run, she returned to Boston and Quonset Point before she again underwent repairs for her temperamental engines. The operations of January and February continued well into the spring of 1943. The ship transported men and cargo between Boston, Argentia, and Quonset Point. She also served briefly as a target during exercises held off Block Island and escorted the tanker SS Sabine Sun from Argentia to Boston late in April 1943.

=== World War II South Atlantic operations June 1943–May 1944 ===
After installation of YG homing equipment, QC sonar, and other gear, Barnegat left Boston on 31 May 1943. She took part briefly in local exercises, then headed south on 6 June 1943. She reached Norfolk, Virginia, on the morning of 7 June 1943, but on 15 June 1943 cleared the Virginia Capes for Brazil. Steaming via Bermuda, Barnegat reached Natal, on Brazil's northeastern coast, on 26 June 1943. Reporting for duty with Fleet Air Wing (FAW) 16, Barnegat relieved seaplane tender USS Humboldt (AVP-21) in servicing Admiral Jonas Ingram's United States Fourth Fleet planes assigned to cover convoys from Brazil to Trinidad. Her arrival coincided with the opening shots of a local German submarine "blitz" against coastal shipping; the day before, the German submarine U-513 had torpedoed the steamer SS Venetia.

Underway again on 28 June 1943, Barnegat dropped down the Brazilian coast and moored at Recife, Brazil, on the morning of 29 June 1943 to start yet more repairs alongside destroyer tender USS Melville (AD-2), an old Iceland comrade. Those repairs done, Barnegat made a brief trip north, touching at Natal and Recife before returning south with the tanker SS Gulfport. Stopping at Bahia, Brazil, on 9 July 1943, the pair continued south and reached Rio de Janeiro, Brazil, on 13 July 1943. Her presence there having been dictated by the recent rash of sinkings by U-boats in the region, after taking a load of gasoline from Gulfport, Barnegat departed Rio de Janeiro on 17 July 1943 for Florianópolis, Brazil, less than 500 nautical miles (930 km) in a straight-line distance from Rio de Janeiro, as part of the temporary measures to meet the U-boat threat. Two Martin Martin PBM-3C Mariner flying-boat patrol bombers of Patrol Squadron 74 (VP-74) also were sent to Florianapolis. Anchoring on 18 July 1943, Barnegat was ready to receive the two planes when they arrived less than four hours later.

Operations commenced on the morning of 19 July 1943. At 07:02, PBM-3C "74-P-5", flown by Lieutenant, junior grade, Roy S. Whitcomb, took off from San Miguel, Florianópolis, on an antisubmarine sweep. The patrol proceeded uneventfully until the radar operator reported a contact at 13:55. As Whitcomb looked at the "sharp blip" on his own radar scope, the second pilot called his attention to something to starboard. Whitcomb recognized the object as a surfaced U-boat and sent his crew to battle stations. Soon, their quarry, U-513, saw the attacking plane and began to take evasive action. Whitcomb's PBM-3C dropped six depth charges and caught the U-boat in a starboard turn. The U-boat absorbed the full impact of at least two direct hits; two depth charges straddled the submarine and two others struck her deck. Within moments, observers in the Mariner saw "rising boils and [a] brown stain on [the] water...." U-513 was no more.

Seeing 15 to 20 men struggling in the oily water, Whitcomb circled the scene and dropped life belts and two life rafts to the U-513 survivors, while informing Barnegat of the kill. Barnegat proceeded swiftly to the scene, arrived there in less than four hours, and began a search. At 19:15, she sighted a life raft with seven men on board and closed to pick them up. The first man came on board at 19:30 and the last boarded 20 minutes later. Among them she counted the U-513's 28-year-old commanding officer, Kapitänleutnant Friedrich Guggenberger, the ace awarded the Knight's Cross of the Iron Cross for sinking the British aircraft carrier HMS Ark Royal (91) off Gibraltar in November 1941 as commander of the German submarine U-81.

The gathering darkness prevented Barnegat from locating more survivors, and she finally ceased her efforts shortly after midnight. Although she returned then to San Miguel Bay to resume operations, she had not heard the last of U-513. At 11:30 on 22 July 1943, her other plane, "74-P-7", reported sighting a life raft with survivors on board. Underway shortly after noon, Barnegat proceeded to the scene and at 16:45 reached two rafts which had been lashed together. These 18 men -- Chief Engineer Harold Van R. Forest of the recently sunk merchant ship Richard Caswell along with 11 men of her crew and six members of her Naval Armed Guard detachment—were clinging to the raft. Ironically, Richard Caswell—torpedoed on 16 July 1943—had been U-513's last victim. Barnegat returned to San Miguel Bay at 21:59 on 22 July 1943 but remained there only overnight, getting underway early on the morning of 23 July 1943 for Rio de Janeiro. Reaching that port at 11:00 on 24 July 1943, she was held incommunicado until her prisoners could be transferred to authorities ashore on the morning of 25 July 1943. Once that happened, Barnegat shifted to another berth and disembarked the 18 men from Richard Caswell.

Over the next few days, Barnegat remained at Rio de Janeiro. While she was there, Trinidad-bound Convoy JT 3 departed under mixed air cover of both the U.S. Navy and the Brazilian Air Force. Among the planes so tasked, the PBM-3C that had sunk U-513 carried out a routine antisubmarine sweep in advance of the convoy when its radar raised a contact. This proved to be U-199, a Type IXD U-boat on her maiden war patrol and U-513's collaborator in the recent campaign against Allied shipping. U-199 increased speed, and her quartermaster put her helm over to starboard. Confusion reigned below, however, as some of her forward tanks were flooded for an emergency crash dive.

The Mariner attacked at 07:18, and U-199 opened fire as soon as the seaplane came into range. The Mariner's machine guns swept the decks, while the plane straddled U-199 with a stick of six bombs that showered the submarine with tons of spray. After landing her two remaining bombs close aboard without sinking the submarine, the plane radioed for assistance. Though badly shaken, U-199 tried to repair her damage and clear the area, but she could not evade her pursuers. A Brazilian Lockheed Hudson bomber responded to the Mariner's call for help and attacked, followed shortly by a Brazilian PBY Catalina, which administered the coup de grace.

Informed at 09:58 that the U-boat had been sunk, Barnegat hurried to the scene led by another PBM Mariner. She spotted life rafts at 11:38 and, by shortly after noon, had picked up five officers and seven enlisted men, among them U-199's commanding officer. In the post mortem on the attack, VP-74's commanding officer, Commander Joseph P. Toth, singled out Barnegat, for her "usual good performance...in recovering the survivors" of the sunken U-boat. Once again, Barnegat anchored in the harbor at Rio de Janeiro with her prisoners-of-war held incommunicado until they could be taken ashore. Between 05:20 and 05:40, U-199's men disembarked under heavy guard, en route to the airport and a speedy trip to the United States for a thorough interrogation.

Barnegat remained in Brazilian waters into the spring of 1944, operating at Bahia, Recife, Natal, Fortaleza, Fernando de Noronha, São Luís, and Florianópolis. As before, she hauled freight, transported men and gear, and tended patrol planes of Fleet Air Wing 16 (FAW-16). Her only time out of Brazilian waters came when she briefly conducted tending operations at Montevideo, Uruguay, from 13 March 1944 to 16 March 1944. Another break in her routine came on 29 November 1943 and 30 November 1943, when she patrolled off the entrance to the harbor at Bahia to cover the arrival of a task group formed around battleship USS Iowa (BB-61) during Iowa's return at the conclusion of her part in transporting President Franklin D. Roosevelt to the Teheran Conference.

=== North Atlantic operations May 1944–January 1945 ===
Barnegat wrapped up her work in Brazilian waters, at São Luís, on 12 May 1944 and departed for the United States that afternoon. Steaming via Bermuda and Norfolk, she arrived at Boston on 24 May 1944. Following voyage repairs and alterations at the Boston Navy Yard, she sailed to Norfolk in early July 1944 and then made passenger and freight voyages to Bahia Praia and Horta, Azores, and to Casablanca, before returning to Norfolk on 16 August 1944. On 7 September 1944, Barnegat departed Norfolk and proceeded to Eastern Bay, in Maryland at the mouth of the Patuxent River, where she laid out a seaplane operating area, placing mooring buoys and seadrome lights to prepare for training operations with Patrol Wing 5 (VP-5). She worked with these aircraft over the next two weeks and returned to Norfolk on 23 September 1944.

Returning to transport duties soon thereafter, she again sailed for the Azores and Morocco on a voyage that also took her to Bristol, England, late in October 1944. She returned to Norfolk on the morning of 9 November 1944 and spent the remainder of that month and the first half of December 1944 at the Norfolk Navy Yard in Portsmouth, Virginia, undergoing repairs. Underway on 14 December 1944, Barnegat reached Bermuda on 16 December 1944 and occupied the next few days training with Patrol Bombing Squadron 107 (VPB-107) and Patrol Bombing Squadron 125 (VPB-215) of Fleet Air Wing 9 (FAW-9) in practice fuelings, rearmings, and general servicing. Then she got underway on 29 December 1944 in company with destroyer USS Ellis (DD-154) to return to Norfolk, and reached Norfolk on 31 December 1944. She then spent a month getting repairs to hull damage suffered at Bermuda.

=== Pacific operations February 1945–August 1945 ===
Barnegat departed for the Canal Zone on 5 February 1945. She arrived at Coco Solo, Panama, early on 11 February 1945 and relieved seaplane tender USS Rockaway (AVP-29). For the next few months, Barnegat served in constant "ready duty" status, prepared to get underway, often within an hour. Her Central American service comprised tending patrol planes and transport duty. She supported the advanced naval air base at Baltra Island in the Galapagos Islands, making several trips there from the Canal Zone and remaining at such picturesque spots as Aeolian Cove and Tagus Cove on Isabella Island, tending Patrol Bombing Squadron 74 (VPB-74) aircraft. She also visited Bahia Honda, Colombia, and Limon Bay, Panama.

Barnegat established an independent air base at Tagus Cove, enabling the patrol bombers to extend their coverage farther off the coast of South America than previously possible. There, she provided fuel for the planes, deployed lighted mooring buoys, billeted and fed the crews, provided bombs and bomb-loading crews, kept crash and fueling boats in the water at all times to fulfill all of the squadron's needs. Occasionally, Barnegat also carried out salvage and rescue operations out of Coco Solo, participating in a search for a lost Grumman F6F Hellcat fighter pilot in March 1945 and assisting some downed PBM Mariners in June 1945.

== Postwar career ==
The end of hostilities with Germany in early May 1945 and with Japan in mid-August 1945 altered neither the tempo nor the scope of Barnegat's operations, for she remained busy at Coco Solo into September 1945, making only one brief visit to the United States—at Miami, Florida—between 18 September 1945 and 22 September 1945.

After returning to Coco Solo on 26 September 1945, Barnegat operated there into October 1945, sinking discarded PBM Mariner hulls at sea with gunfire on 6 October 1945 and 15 October 1945. She then transited the Panama Canal on 19 October 1945, en route to Baltra Island, arriving there early on 22 October 1945. Barnegat carried out practice operations with Patrol Bombing Squadron 201 (VPB-201) at Tagus Cove until 31 October 1945, when Patrol Bombing Squadron 204 (VPB-204) arrived for training. Shifting to Aeolian Cove on 8 November 1945, Barnegat sailed for the Canal Zone the next day. She transited the Panama Canal on 14 November 1945, returning soon thereafter to Coco Solo to dispose of more junked PBM Mariner hulls by gunfire between 19 November 1945 and 26 November 1945.

Relieved by seaplane tender USS San Carlos (AVP-51), Barnegat set course for the United States on 11 December 1945 and reached the Naval Repair Base, Algiers, Louisiana, on 15 December 1945. Shifting on 17 December 1945 to a berth alongside destroyer escort USS Reuben James (DE-153), Barnegat spent the remainder of 1945 there. In January 1946, she moved on to Orange, Texas, arriving there on 14 January 1946.

== Decommissioning and disposal ==
Decommissioned on 17 May 1946, Barnegat saw no more active service. Her name was struck from the Navy List on 23 May 1958. She was transferred to the Maritime Administration for disposal.

== Commercial service ==
The Maritime Administration sold Barnegat in 1962 to the Greek cruise ship line Kavounides Shipping Co., Ltd. Renamed MV Kentavros she operated on cruises from Piraeus, Greece. Finally, she was scrapped at Eleusis, Greece, in 1986.

== Awards ==
Barnegat received one battle star for her World War II service.
