= Battle of Mamora (1696) =

Battle between the Portuguese and Moroccan fleets off the coast of Mamora

- Part of Moroccan–Portuguese conflicts
Date	Summer of 1696
Location	Mehdya, Morocco
Result	Portuguese victory

Belligerents
(Kingdom of Portugal) Portuguese Empire	Sultanate of Morocco

Commanders and leaders
(Kingdom of Portugal) Francisco Carvalho	Unknown

Strength
1 frigate	Many vessels

Casualties and losses
Unknown	Unknown

The Battle of Mamora (1696) took place in the summer of 1696 between the Portuguese and Moroccan fleets off the coast of Mamora. The Portuguese left the battle victorious after repelling several Muslim vessels.

== Background ==
The ports of Mamora and Salé were pirate havens that constantly threatened the Portuguese coast. To counter this, the Portuguese sent their navy to block those ports, most likely in the spring of 1694.

On August 12, the ship São Boaventura and the frigates Nossa Senhora do Pilar and Nossa Senhora Penha de França reached Salé under the command of Captain Francisco Carvalho.

While São Boaventura blocked Salé, the frigates were sent to block Mamora. At the end of August, Penha de França and Pilar engaged in combat with a ship from Algeria, which was trying to leave the port. São Boaventura quickly came to aid the Portuguese and after a few hours of intense fighting, the Algerian ship was captured.

== Battle ==
The blockade of the ports of Salé and Mamora probably continued in the following years and in the summer of 1696, Nossa Senhora Penha de França, which was patrolling Mamora, was attacked by many Moroccan vessels, but it managed to repel them.

== See also ==
- Moroccan-Portuguese conflicts
- Battle of Mamora (1515)
