= John Petit =

John Petit may refer to:

- John Petit (bishop) (1895–1973), Roman Catholic prelate; Bishop of Menevia, 1947–1972
- John Lewis Petit (1736–1780), English physician
- John Louis Petit (1801–1868), English clergyman and architectural artist
- Sir John Petit, High Sheriff of Cornwall, 1334–1336

== See also ==
- Jean Petit (disambiguation)
