= SS Contessa =

Refrigerated cargo and passenger ship

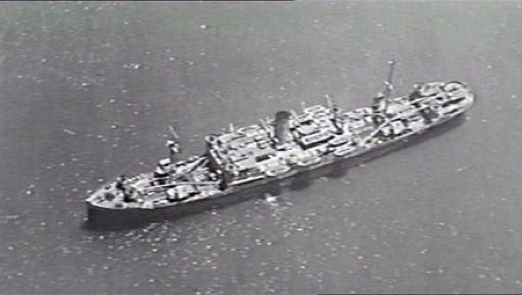
- Contessa as U.S. Army SWPA X-96 troop ship armed with 5 inch gun and 20 mm Oerlikon AA guns.

History
- Name: Contessa
- Namesake: Contessa Entellina, Sicily, birthplace of Vaccaro brothers
- Owner: Vaccaro Brothers & Company; Standard Fruit & Steamship Company
- Port of registry: La Ceiba, Honduras
- Builder: Barclay, Curle & Co, Glasgow
- Yard number: 638, Clydeholm Yard
- Launched: 18 February 1930

General characteristics
- Tonnage: 5,512 GRT
- Length: 381 ft 5 in (116.3 m)
- Beam: 53 ft 7 in (16.3 m)
- Draught: 30 ft 6 in (9.3 m)
- Propulsion: 1-screw; steam, Q4Cyl. (25, 37, 54 & 78 – 48) inch. 260 lb (120 kg). 895 hp (667 kW), nominally.
- Speed: 16 knots (18 mph; 30 km/h)
- Notes: Refrigeration by Haslam & Newton, Ltd., cooling 285,000 cubic feet (8,100 m^{3}) of cargo space delivering 6,840,000 cubic feet (194,000 m^{3}) of chilled air per hour.

Contessa was a refrigerated cargo and passenger ship of 5,512 GRT built by Barclay, Curle & Co., Glasgow for Vaccaro Brothers & Company launched 18 February 1930. The ship, along with sister ship Cefalu, served ports in the United States (New York and New Orleans), Cuba, and Central America specifically La Ceiba, Honduras which is still a port for the fruit trade. The ship became part of the Standard Fruit Company, a company established by Vaccaro Brothers, and operated as a cargo passenger vessel until taken over at New Orleans by the War Shipping Administration (WSA) on 29 May 1942 with Standard Fruit Company remaining as the WSA operating agent. The ship was later bareboat sub chartered to the United States War Department 14 July 1943 and operated in the Army's Southwest Pacific Area local fleet under the local fleet number X-96 from 18 September 1943 into 1945 as a troop ship. The ship was returned to WSA with Standard Fruit again its agent on 28 May 1946 in Brooklyn until returned to the company for commercial operation at New Orleans on 20 August 1947.

== Commercial service ==
Service began with sailings from New York at noon each Thursday by either Contessa or sister ship Cefalu for twelve day travel to the tropical waters and ports with advertisements emphasizing the fact all passenger accommodations were well ventilated "outside" staterooms. Features included hot and cold water in all rooms with either hot and cold salt water baths or freshwater showers and a saltwater swimming pool on the after deck. By 1934, the two ships were operating from the United States out of New Orleans rather than New York.

== Wartime service ==
On 29 May 1942 Contessa was taken over by the War Shipping Administration (WSA) in New York with the Standard Fruit Company remaining as the WSA operating agent and the ship retaining its Honduran registry. In October Contessa was chosen at the last minute to solve a problem facing Operation Torch planners in rapidly supplying the airfield to be captured at Port-Lyautey that lay up the Sebou River with aviation gasoline and munitions. The piers at the Port-Lyautey airfield lay in a "U" bend of the river approximately five miles from the landing beaches but nine miles up the shallow river with a maximum depth that even at the highest November tides limited access to ships drawing no more than 19 feet (5.8 m). Contessa arrived at Norfolk as the convoy was preparing to sail in a leaking condition with engine problems that required immediate dry docking expected to take several days. By extraordinary effort the ship was repaired early, but in the meantime much of the crew had left town in expectation of a longer stay. Three days late, with a crew filled out from seaman volunteers from a local Naval brig released from minor offenses, the ship got underway from the Hampton Roads Port of Embarkation in the early hours of 27 October (Note: Official Army histories differ with some giving the 26 October date. Bykofsky citing Maj. William Reginald Wheeler's The Road to Victory, A History of Hampton Roads Port of Embarkation in World War II notes sailing was "early morning hours of 27 October".) in an unescorted dash across the Atlantic to join the convoy. Contessa, loaded with only 738 tons of gasoline and bombs, overtook the convoy on 7 November. (Note: Contessa normally had a draft of 30 feet 6 inches (9.3 m). It is possible the light load was intended to lighten the ship in order to pass the Sebou River entrance bar.) At 1620 on 10 November the Contessa entered the Sebou River, led by USS Dallas with a U.S. Army Raider battalion embarked and followed by USS Barnegat, to deliver the aviation gasoline and munitions for the seventy-seven (Note: Howe in The Mediterranean Theater of Operations — Northwest Africa: Seizing The Initiative In The West (p. 150) specifies the number as 76 while other official histories, including The Army Air Forces In World War II—Europe: Torch To Pointblank (p. 77), specify 77.) Army P-40 aircraft launched in the morning by the auxiliary aircraft carrier USS Chenango but ran aground when passing the Kasba and had to await a higher tide the morning of 11 November.

On 14 July 1943 WSA placed Contessa under sub bareboat charter to the United States War Department for operation by the United States Army Transportation Corps. By 18 September 1943 Contessa had joined the Army's Southwest Pacific Area local fleet under the local fleet number X-96. Her sister ship, Cefalu, also joined that fleet on the same date as X-95 with both now being classed as 14.6 knot ships, converted in theater for troop transport and were serving as "leave ships" used to transport troops for rest in Australia from the New Guinea fronts. The Australian War Memorial photo of the ship in the Southwest Pacific notes armament with a five-inch gun and 20 mm antiaircraft guns at bow, on superstructure and aft.

In 1944, with planning for the Philippine campaign underway and a severe shortage of refrigerated transport available in theater, both Contessa and Cefalu were considered for reconversion to refrigerated transports. During the conversion to troop transports the refrigeration machinery had not been removed and on 2 November 1944 General MacArthur approved reconversion of the ships into refrigerated transports to provide 327,886 cubic feet vice the remnant 82,410 cubic feet of refrigerated space with the request the work be done at San Francisco rather than in Australian yards to reduce delay. The request was granted on 18 December 1944 with Contessa being the first ship to be followed by Cefalu when her conversion was complete. The conversion was not completed until June 1945 and work on Cefalu was not due until July. Even the conversion of Contessa was ineffective with the ship being returned to San Francisco on 20 September 1945 because its refrigeration could not maintain required low temperatures in the tropics.

On 28 May 1946 the ship was again placed under Standard Fruit Company operating at New York as the WSA agent until returned to the company in New Orleans for commercial service on 20 August 1947.

== Postwar service ==
Contessa returned to regular service after the war but was sold and registered in the Netherlands in 1959 as Leeuwarden and then Panama in 1965 as Tropicana II and Santa Anna spending much of the time idle before scrapping in 1970.

== Bibliography ==
- Bykofsky, Joseph; Larson, Harold (1990). The Technical Services—The Transportation Corps: Operations Overseas. United States Army In World War II. Washington, DC: Center Of Military History, United States Army. LCCN 56060000.
- Craven, Wesley Frank; Cate, James Lea (1983). Europe, Torch to Pointblank, August 1942 to December 1943. The Army Air Forces In World War II. Vol. 2. Washington, D.C.: Office of Air Force History. ISBN 0-912799-03-X. LCCN 83017288.
- Grover, David (1987). U.S. Army Ships and Watercraft of World War II. Naval Institute Press. ISBN 0-87021-766-6. LCCN 87015514.
- Howe, George F. (1993). The Mediterranean Theater of Operations — Northwest Africa: Seizing The Initiative In The West. United States Army In World War II. Washington, DC: Center Of Military History, United States Army. LCCN 57060021.
- Leighton, Richard M; Coakley, Robert W (1955–68). The War Department — Global Logistics And Strategy 1940–1943. United States Army In World War II. Vol. 1. Washington, DC: Center Of Military History, United States Army. LCCN 55060001.
- Masterson, Dr. James R. (1949). U. S. Army Transportation In The Southwest Pacific Area 1941-1947. Washington, D. C.: Transportation Unit, Historical Division, Special Staff, U. S. Army.
