= Barbary Coast =

Coastal region of North Africa inhabited by Berber people

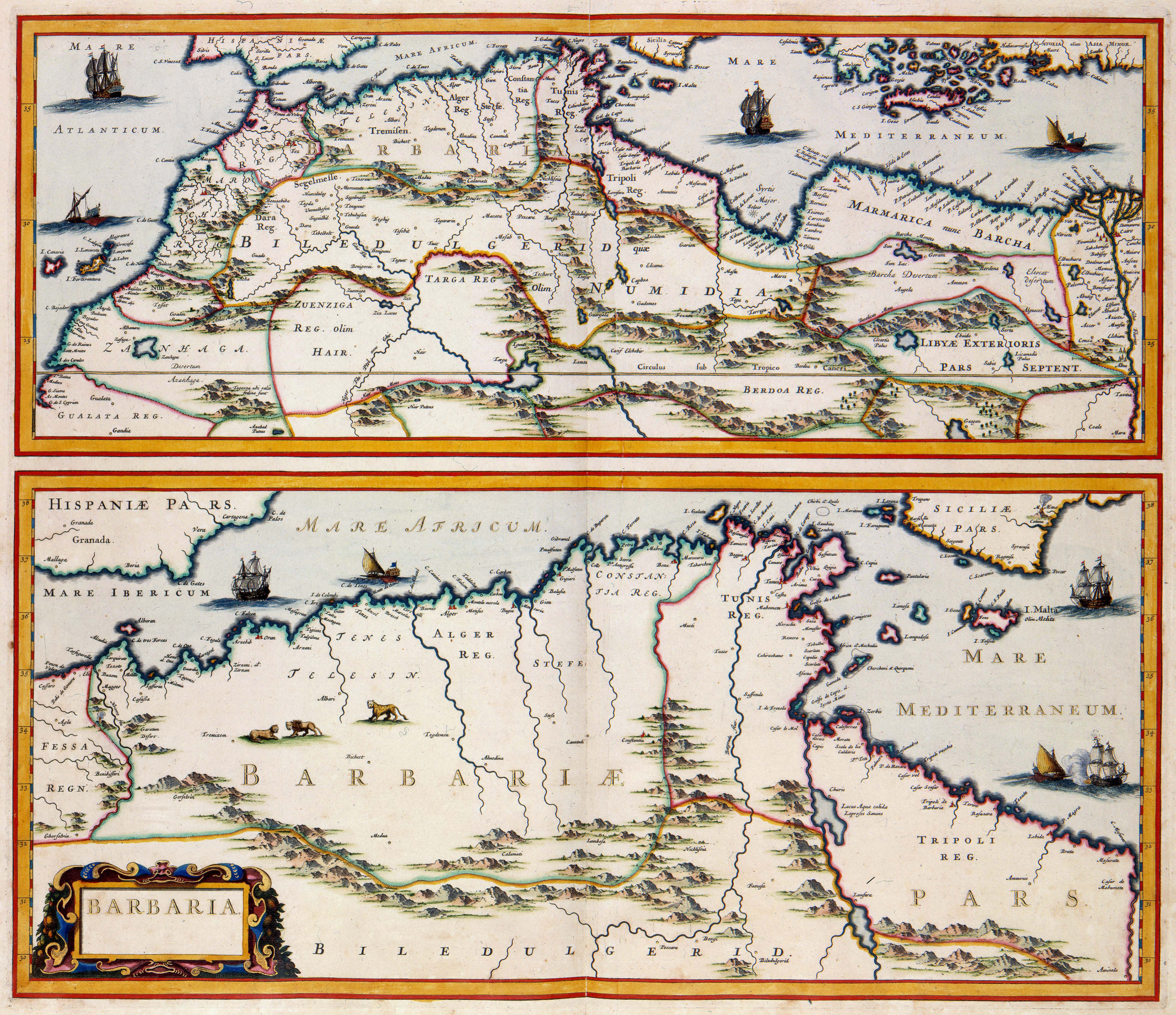
A 17th-century map by the Dutch cartographer Jan Janssonius showing the Barbary Coast, here "Barbaria"

The Barbary Coast (also Barbary, Berbery, or Berber Coast) were the coastal areas of central and western North Africa, more specifically, the Maghreb and the Ottoman borderlands consisting of the regencies in Algiers, Tunis, and Tripoli, as well as the Sultanate of Morocco from the 16th to 19th centuries. The term originates from an exonym for the Berbers (now called Amazigh).

== Political diversity ==
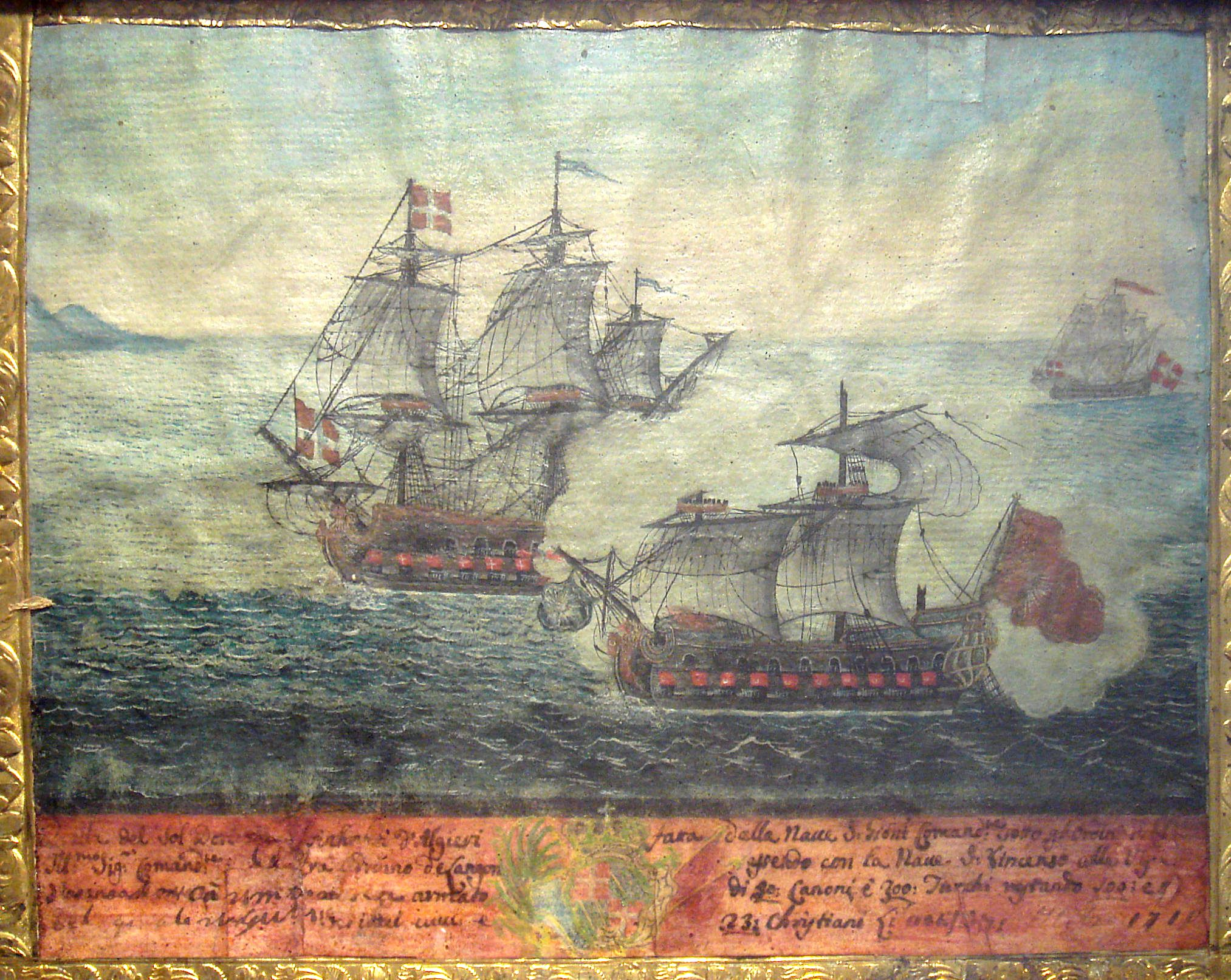
Ex-voto of a naval battle between a Turkish ship from Algiers (front) and a ship of the Order of Malta under Langon, 1719

Barbary was not always a unified political entity. From the 16th century onward, it was divided into four political entities—from west to east—the Alawi Sultanate, the Regency of Algiers, the Regency of Tunis, and the Regency of Tripoli. Major rulers and petty monarchs during the times of the Barbary states' plundering parties included the sultan of Morocco, the dey of Algiers, bey of Tunis, and pasha of Tripoli, respectively.

== The slave trade ==
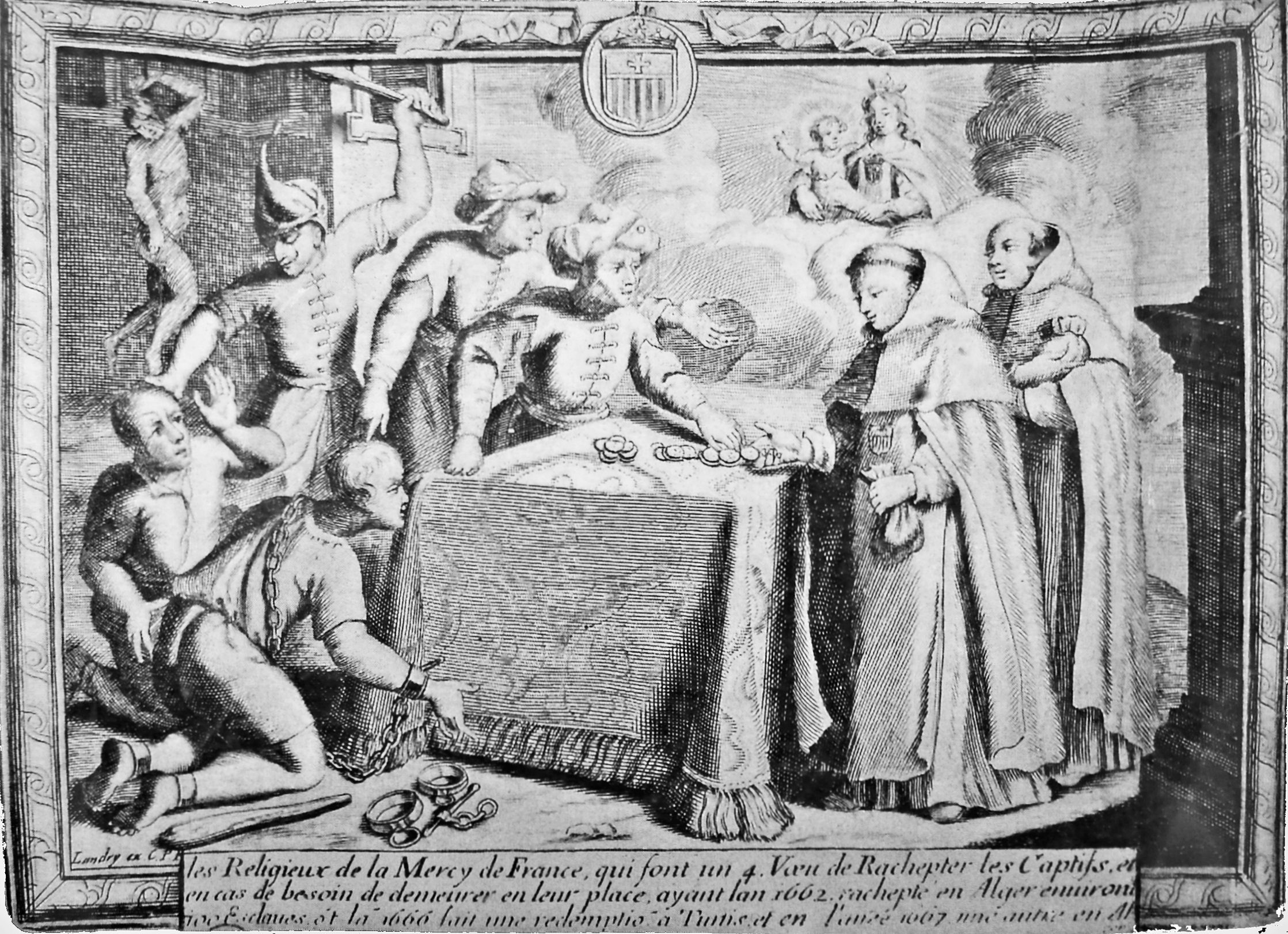
Purchase of Christian captives in the Barbary states

The slave trade was not just an economic lifeline to the Barbary States. Although mainly captives from sea piracy and coastal raiding around the Mediterranean, there were also Atlantic raids as far as Iceland.

The Ottoman Eastern Mediterranean was the scene of intense piracy. As late as the 18th century, piracy continued to be a "consistent threat to maritime traffic in the Aegean". Slaving came to an end in the early 1830s after the French conquest of Algeria.

== Naval capabilities ==
In 1625, the pirate fleet of Algiers, by far the largest, numbered 100 ships of various sizes, carrying 8,000 to 10,000 men. The corsair industry alone accounted for 25 percent of the workforce of the city, not counting other activities of the port. The fleet only averaged 25 ships in the 1680s, but these were larger vessels than had been used since the 1620s, so the fleet still employed some 7,000 men. In addition, 2,500 men manned the pirate fleet of Tripoli, 3,000 in Tunis, and several thousand more in the various minor pirate bases such as Bona, Susa, Bizerta, and Salé. The corsairs were not solely natives of the cities where they were based; while many were Arabs and Berbers, there were also Turks, Greeks, Albanians, Syrians, and renegade Italians, especially Corsicans, among their number.

== Conflict with Western powers ==
=== Spain ===
When the fall of Granada completed the Reconquista in Iberia, Ferdinand II launched campaigns to curb Barbary piracy, taking North African cities including Melilla, and Charles V installed his vassal Muley Hacen in Tunis, though much of the Mediterranean remained under Ottoman influence until the Battle of Lepanto in 1571. In the 17th century, Barbary pirates, now including expelled Moriscos adopted European naval tactics most notably in the Republic of Salé whose 'Moriscos' exploited their familiarity with Spanish shores to raid the Spanish Levante in the 17th century. From 1617 onward, pirate raids targeted the northwest of Spain (Galicia), prompting the formation of a Spanish fleet around 1621 to defend against Barbary corsairs and the Dutch, albeit with limited success.

=== United States ===
The United States fought the Barbary Wars from 1801 to 1805 with some of the Barbary states which led up to the Battle of Derna, the second overseas military land action of the United States and the inspiration for the opening line of the Marines' Hymn "From the halls of Montezuma to the shores of Tripoli...". The Second Barbary War ended with an agreement that American ships had free passage without the need to pay tribute.

=== Portugal ===
Between 1232 and 1245, various expeditions set out southward from the Balearic Islands, driven by the spirit of the Crusades. Conflicts among Arab tribes, Berbers, and Moorish kings led to the 1230 collapse of the Almohad Empire—founded in the 12th century—which was succeeded by three rival kingdoms: the Hafsids, who proclaimed themselves caliphs in Tunis; the Zayyanids in Tlemcen; and the Marinids of Fez. The conflict extended to Tlemcen, where a wall was built enclosing a palace and the mosque known as "The Victorious."

== See also ==
- Barbary corsairs
- Piracy in the Persian Gulf
  - Pirate Coast
