= Thymiaterium =

Carthaginian colony in Mauretania

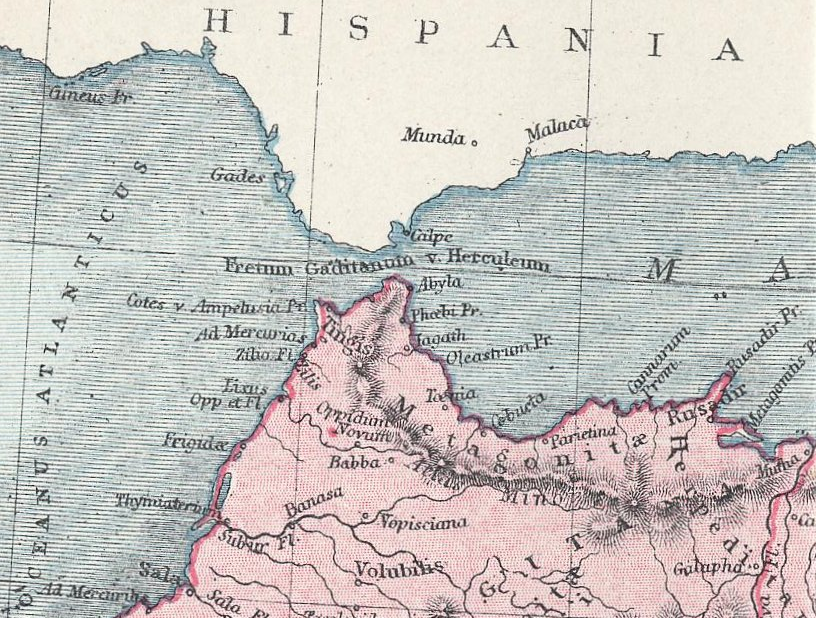
Thymiaterium is seen here at the lower left, on what is now the Atlantic coast of Morocco.

Thymiaterium or Thymiaterion (Ancient Greek: Θυμιατήριον), called Thymiaterias (Θυμιατηρίας) by Scylax, was an ancient Carthaginian colony in present-day Morocco. The Periplus (Περίπλους) of Hanno the Navigator claims that he founded it on his journey of exploration beyond the Pillars of Hercules.

According to Hanno, he founded the colony, the first of his journey, two days' sail past the Pillars of Hercules. Schoff, citing Karl Müller, identified it with the town of Mehedia, currently known as Mehdya. The location of Thymiaterium is also given at Mehedia in the Atlas of Ancient & Classical Geography. Hanno may have been deliberately vague about the location of colonies he founded to prevent enemies of Carthage from finding them.
