= Jean Petit =

Jean Petit may refer to:

- Jean Petit (footballer, born 1949), French footballer
- Jean Petit (footballer, born 1914) (1914–1944), Belgian footballer
- Jean Petit (theologian) (died 1411), French theologian
- Jean Louis Petit (1674–1750), French surgeon and inventor of a screw type tourniquet
- Jean Robert Petit, French paleoclimatologist
- Jean-Claude Petit (born 1943), French composer and arranger
- Jean Claude Petit (1819 – 1903), French sculptor
- Jean Petit (printer) or Jehan Petit, French printer in the 15th and 16th centuries

== See also ==
- John Petit (disambiguation)
