= Galleon =

Large and multi-decked sailing ships

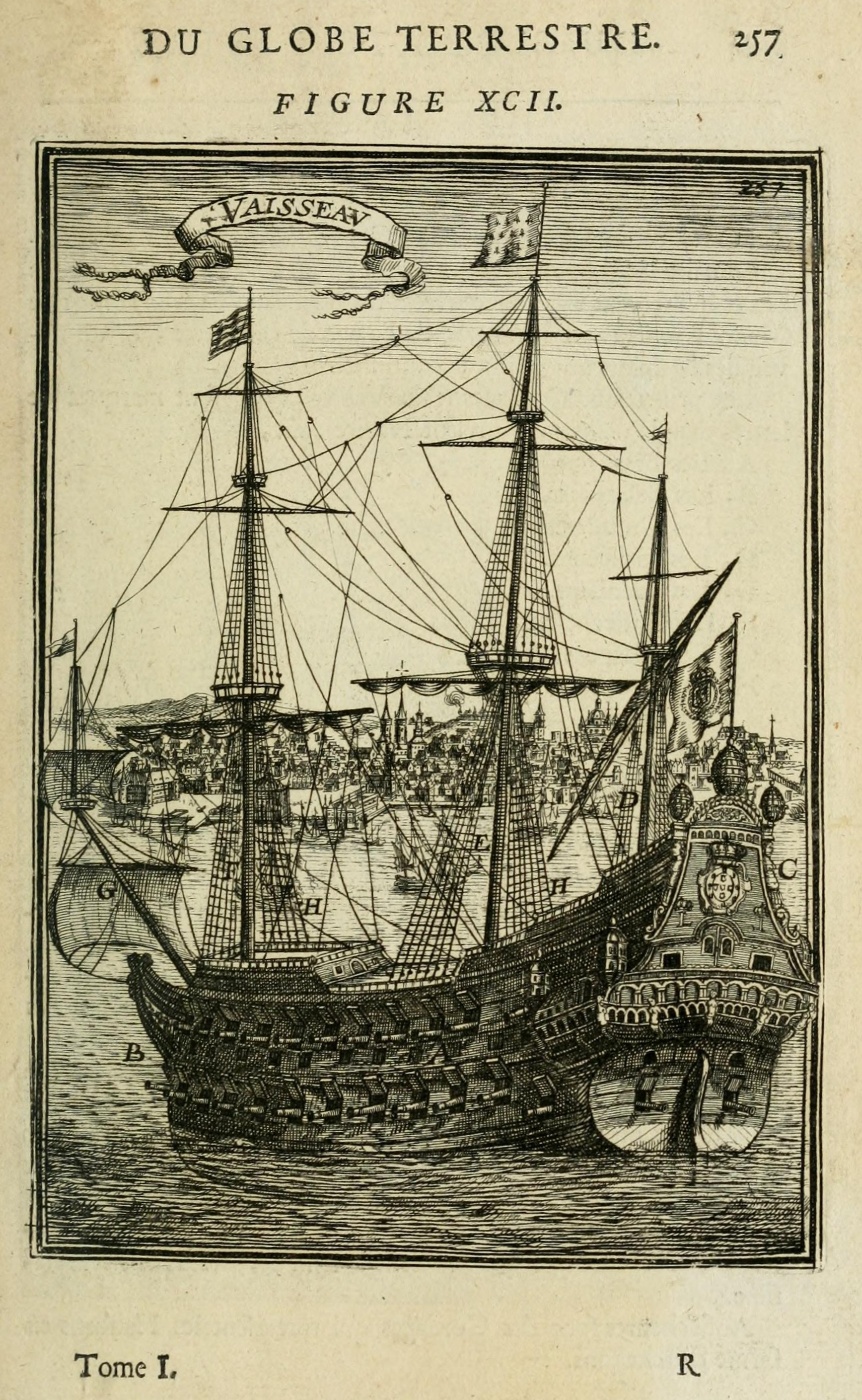
Depiction of a Portuguese galleon

Galleons were large, multi-decked sailing ships developed in the early 16th century from ships such as the caravel and the carrack, in Portugal and in Spain. They were first used by Europeans as armed cargo carriers from the 16th to 18th centuries during the Age of Sail, and they were the principal vessels drafted for use as warships until the Anglo-Dutch Wars of the mid-17th century.

Galleons generally carried three or more masts with a lateen fore-and-aft rig on the rear masts, were carvel built with a prominent squared off raised stern, and used square-rigged sail plans on their fore-mast and main-masts. Such ships played a major role in commerce in the sixteenth and seventeenth centuries and were often drafted into use as auxiliary naval war vessels—indeed, they were the mainstay of contending fleets through most of the 150 years of the Age of Exploration—before the Anglo-Dutch wars made purpose-built warships dominant at sea during the remainder of the Age of Sail.

== Etymology ==
The immediate etymology of the English word galleon is uncertain. It was probably borrowed from Italian galeone or galione, later reinforced by Spanish galeón, itself probably borrowed from Italian; these forms ultimately go back to galea (“galley”), with the augmentative suffix -one. Galea, in turn, is derived from Byzantine Greek γαλέα (galéa), glossed as a kind of shark; the ship-name is traditionally explained as a comparison between the swift and agile movement of the fish and that of a galley.

== Terminology ==
The word galleon has had differing meanings at different points in its history and in different regions. The term is thought to originate from gallioni (alternatively galeanni), Venetian oared vessels that were used in rivers in the fifteenth century. The galleons of the sixteenth and seventeenth centuries were fully developed sailing ships. This descriptive name was used notably in Spain, Portugal and Venice. However, inconsistency can be found, for example, in the use of "galleon" by the notaries who worked in the Basque shipbuilding region of northern Spain. Though most of the ships from this region were naos, some were galeones, but the two terms can be found being used as if they were interchangeable by some of the writers of the documents in the contemporary archives.

It is thought that the seamen of the Basque country of northern Spain were clear on the differences between a nao and a galeón, but what those distinguishing features were is not apparent to modern historians. A hypothesis has been put forward that the differences are more in the underwater hull shape – something which cannot be discerned in contemporary illustrations.

The terminological inconsistency of Basque-built ships continues into the present day. Archival research on the Red Bay wreck 24M has identified, with reasonable confidence, this ship to have been San Juan of Pasajes. She is described 26 times in six different contemporary documents with at least three different authors as a nao, and not once as a galeón. However, published archaeological work repeatedly refers to this ship as a galleon.

Outside the Iberian peninsula, the term "galleon" was not often used. For instance, though English shipwrights certainly built galleon-type vessels, they simply referred to them as "ships". In present-day usage, these types are referred to as galleons, with the term "race-built galleon" being applied to those with lower upper-works. In Holland, a "pinnas" was a galleon-type ship, and in the Baltic, "kravel" was used (a term connected with their carvel construction).

== History ==
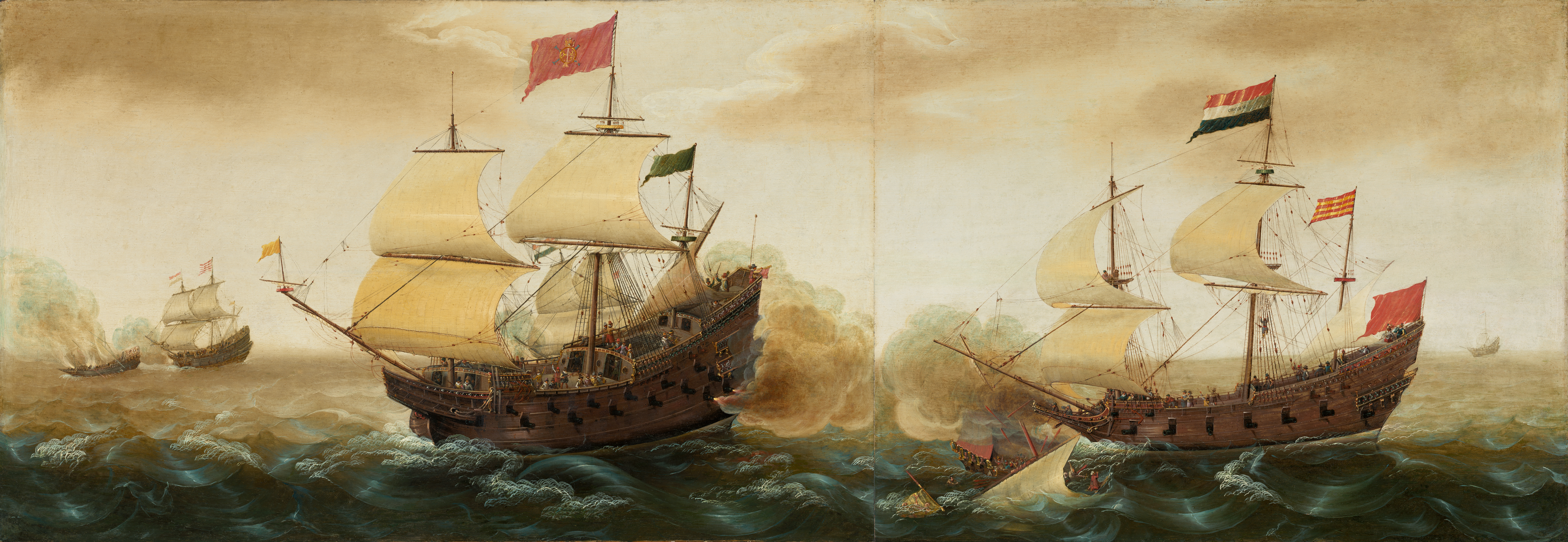
A Spanish galleon (left) firing its cannons at a Dutch warship (right). Cornelis Verbeeck, c. 1618–1620

During the 16th century, a lowering of the carrack's forecastle and elongation of the hull gave the ocean-going ships an unprecedented level of stability in the water, and reduced wind resistance at the front, leading to a faster, more maneuverable vessel. The galleon differed from the carrack and other older types primarily by being longer, lower and narrower, with a square tuck stern instead of a round tuck, and by having a snout or head projecting forward from the bows below the level of the forecastle. While carracks could be very large for the time, with some Portuguese carracks over 1,000 tons, galleons were generally smaller, usually under 500 tons although some Manila galleons were to reach a displacement of 2,000 tons. With the introduction of the galleon in Portuguese India Armadas during the first quarter of the 16th century, carracks' armament was reduced as they became almost exclusively cargo ships (which is why the Portuguese carracks were pushed to such large sizes), leaving any fighting to be done to the galleons. One of the largest and most famous of Portuguese galleons was the São João Baptista (nicknamed Botafogo, "Spitfire"), a 1,000-ton galleon built in 1534, said to have carried 366 guns. Friar Manuel Homem says that this galleon mounted 366 bronze pieces of artillery, including the ones that garrisoned the high castles of stern and bow.

Carracks were usually lightly armed and used for transporting cargo in all the fleets of other Western European states, while galleons were stronger, more heavily armed, and also cheaper to build for the same displacement (five galleons could cost around the same as three carracks) and were therefore a much better investment for use as heavily armed cargo ships or warships. Galleons' design changed and improved through the application of various innovations, and they were particularly linked with the military capabilities of the Atlantic sea powers. It was the captains of the Spanish navy, Pedro Menéndez de Avilés and Álvaro de Bazán, who designed the definitive long and relatively narrow hulled galleon in the 1550s.

The galleon was powered entirely by wind, using sails carried on three or four masts, with a lateen sail continuing to be used on the last (usually third and fourth) masts. They were used in both military and trade applications, most famously in the Spanish treasure fleet, and the Manila galleons. While carracks played the leading role in early global explorations, galleons also played a part in the 16th and 17th centuries. In fact, galleons were so versatile that a single vessel might be refitted for wartime and peacetime roles several times during its lifespan. Galleons also influenced galleasses, vessels created as a middle step between oared galleys and sailing galleons.

Galleons were also used militarily in the Mediterranean, where its calmer winds and waters usually made it more practical to employ rowed galleys. In 1478, the Knights Hospitaller started fielding galleons or carracks in their galley squads to capitalize on their artillery and cargo. Spain also started introducing galleons in the Mediterranean since at least the 1535 conquest of Tunis, which saw the fleet of Andrea Doria and Álvaro de Bazán the Elder using galleys to tow the galleons whenever necessary. The conquest saw the deployment of the Portuguese galleon São João Baptista. A Spanish galleon squad captained by Carlo d'Avalos was slated to participate in the Battle of Lepanto, but due to a lack of wind it arrived too late to fight. In the 16th century, corsairs Jack Ward and Zymen Danseker joined the Ottoman Barbary corsairs and taught them to use galleons and other western sailing ships. In response, Spanish admiral Luis Fajardo deployed his own fleet and destroyed the corsair ships in a raid in La Goulette, the first large scale operation undertaken without the support of rowing ships in the Mediterranean. These battles showed the galleon was started to displace the galley entirely. The trend peaked in 1616 with the battle of Cape Gelidonya, where a Spanish sailing fleet headed by galleons repulsed a huge Ottoman galley fleet.

== Construction ==
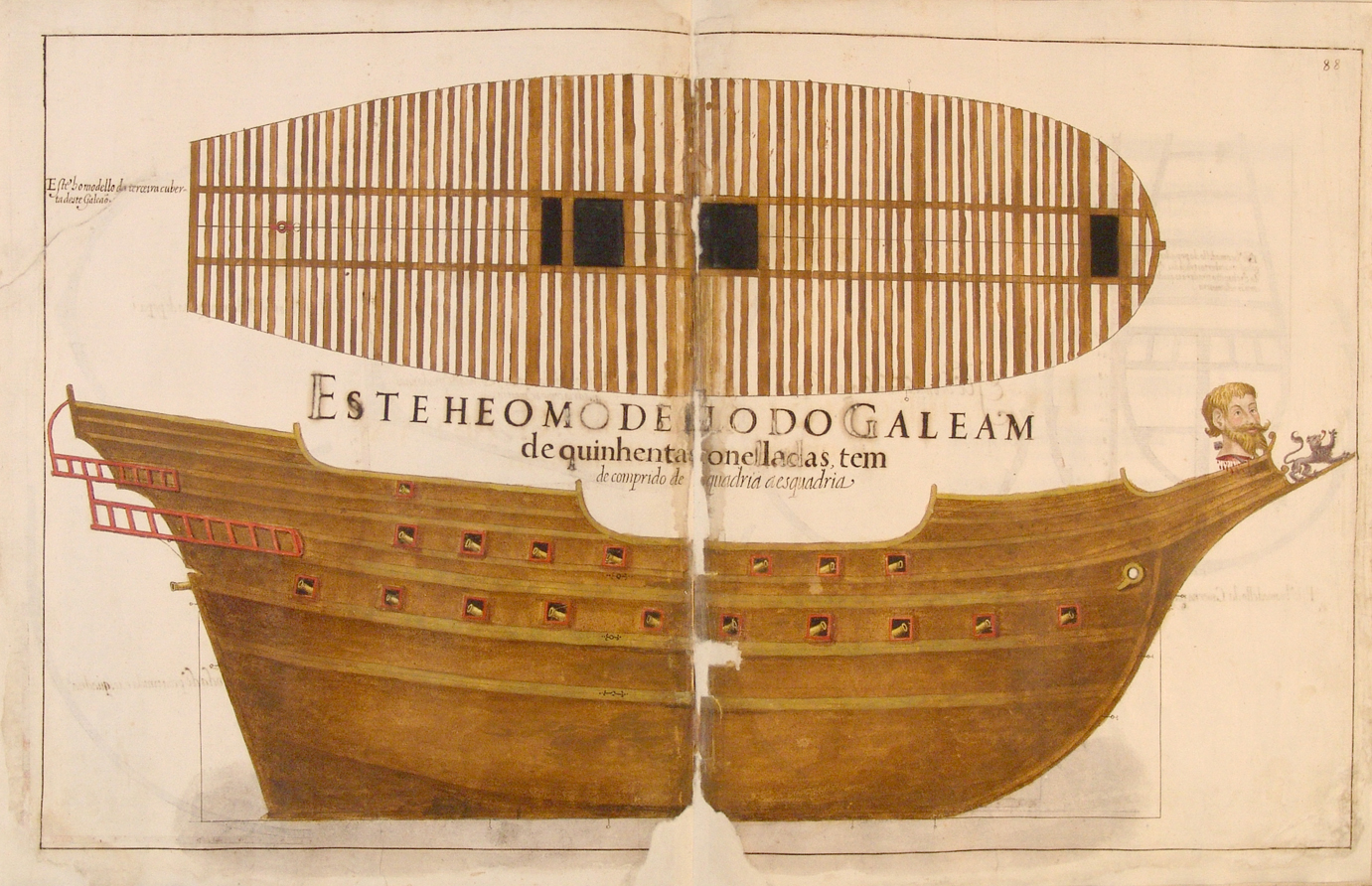
Technical drawing of a late 16th century or early 17th century Portuguese galleon, featured in the Livro de Traças de Carpintaria

The galleon's pintle and gudgeon rudder

Galleons were constructed from oak (for the keel), pine (for the masts) and various hardwoods for hull and decking. Hulls were usually carvel-built. The expenses involved in galleon construction were enormous. Hundreds of expert tradesmen (including carpenters, pitch-melters, blacksmiths, coopers, shipwrights, etc.) worked for months before a galleon was seaworthy. To cover the expense, galleons were often funded by groups of wealthy businessmen who pooled resources for a new ship. Therefore, most galleons were originally consigned for trade, although those captured by rival states were usually put into military service.

The most common gun used aboard a galleon was the demi-culverin, although gun sizes up to demi-cannon were possible.

Because of the long periods often spent at sea and poor conditions on board, many of the crew often perished during the voyage; therefore advanced rigging systems were developed so that the vessel could be sailed home by an active sailing crew a fraction of the size aboard at departure.

== Distinguishing features ==
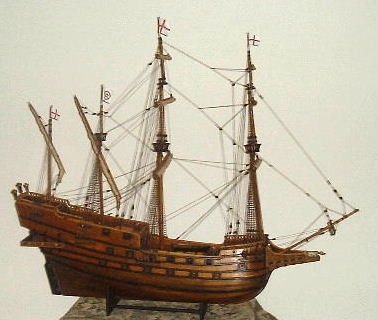
Model of an English galleon sporting four mast types: (left to right) • Bonaventure mizzenmast, typically lateen-rigged and shorter than the main mizzen. • Mizzenmast, typically shorter than the foremast and lateen-rigged. • Mainmast, the tallest mast and, on vessels with more than three masts, the most centrally located. • Foremast, the second-tallest mast.

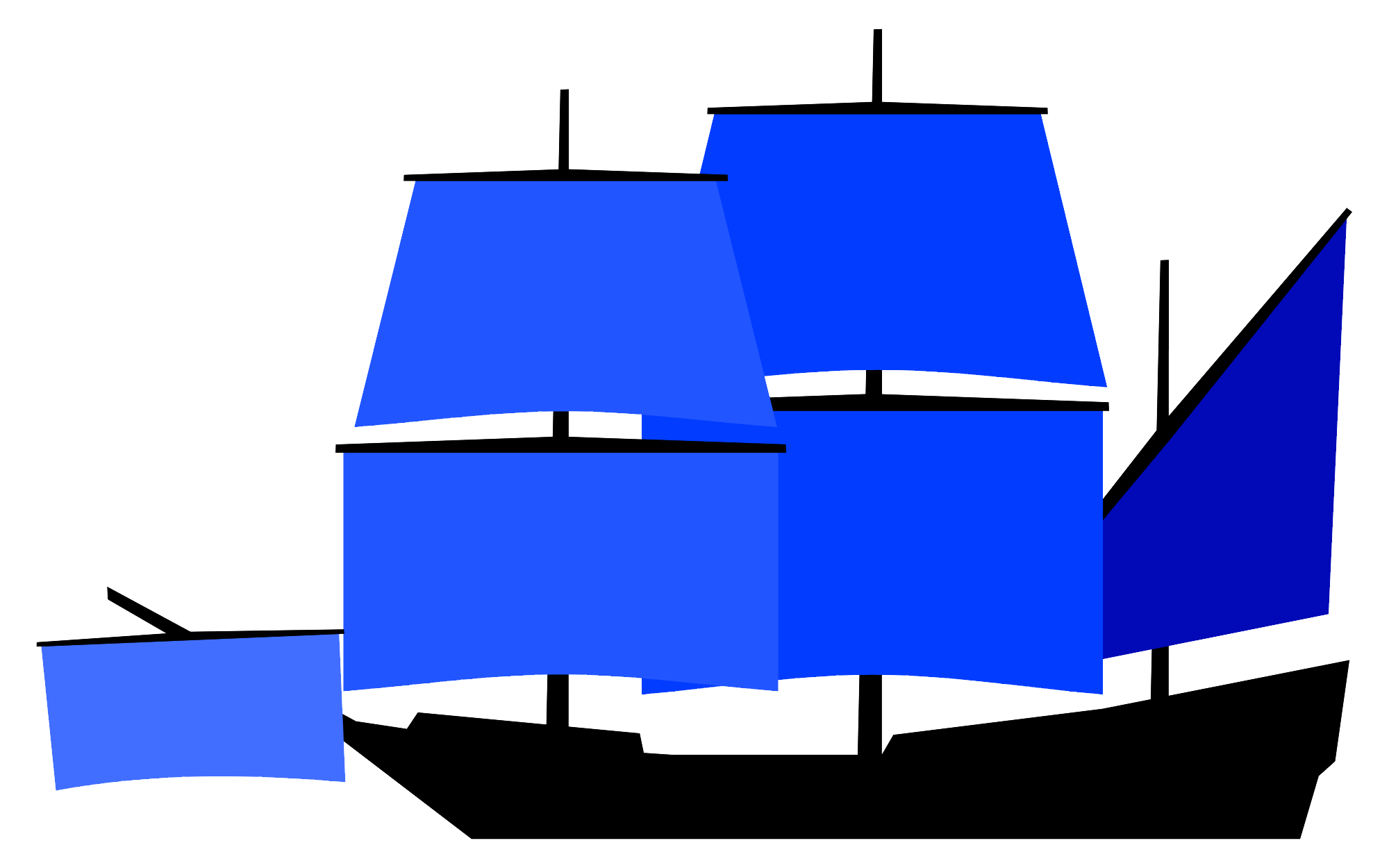
A three-masted vessel, square-rigged on the foremast and mainmast and lateen-rigged on the mizzenmast.

The most distinguishing features of the galleon include the long, prominent beak or beakhead followed by a foremast and mainmast, both noticeably taller than the single or double lateen-rigged mizzenmasts with their sloped lateen-rig yards, and below the square quarter gallery at the stern. On average with three masts, in larger galleons, a fourth mast was added, usually another lateen-rigged mizzen, called the bonaventure mizzen.

== The oldest English drawings ==
The oldest known scale drawings in England are in a manuscript called "Fragments of Ancient Shipwrightry" made in about 1586 by Mathew Baker, a master shipwright. This manuscript, held at the Pepysian Library, Magdalene College, Cambridge, provides an authentic reference for the size and shape of typical English galleons built during this period. Based on these plans, the Science Museum, London has built a 1:48 scale model ship that is an exemplar of galleons of this era.

== Notable galleons ==
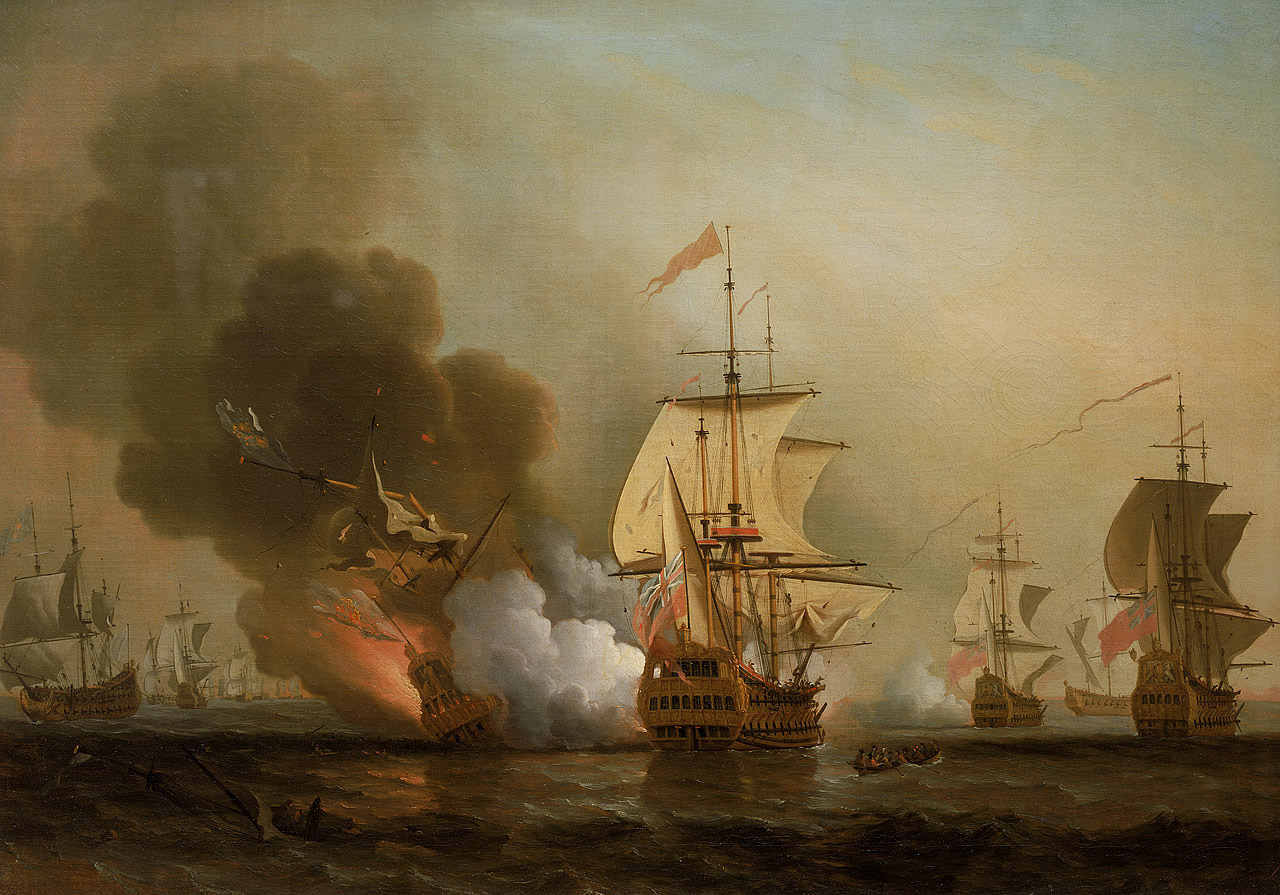
Wager's Action off Cartagena by Samuel Scott shows the 1708 sinking of the Spanish galleon San José

- Adler von Lübeck, the largest ship of its day when launched in 1566.
- Dainty, ship with which Sir Richard Hawkins sought to emulate the circumnavigation voyage of his cousin Francis Drake. She was captured by the Spanish in the action of Atacames Bay in 1594 and served in the Spanish Navy in the South American Pacific for several years.
- Revenge, a galleon built in 1577, the flagship of Sir Francis Drake in the Battle of the Spanish Armada in 1588, was captured by a Spanish fleet off Flores in the Azores in 1591 and sank while being sailed back to Spain.
- Triumph, the largest Elizabethan galleon; flagship of Sir Martin Frobisher in the Battle of the Spanish Armada.
- Galeon Andalucia, a replica galleon built in Spain in 2014.
- Gouden Leeuw, Dutch ship inline of the Third Anglo-Dutch War
- Golden Hind, the ship in which Sir Francis Drake circumnavigated the globe 1577–1580.
- "La Galga", the Assateague Spanish galleon that was shipwrecked in 1794; according to legend, the ancestors of the now famous Chincoteague ponies swam ashore from its hold.
- Nuestra Señora de la Concepción, a Spanish galleon, known to her crew as Cacafuego for her strong cannon. She was captured by Sir Francis Drake in 1578 and all her treasures were brought to England. She was holding treasures mined in one year by the Spanish in the Americas.
- Padre Eterno, a Portuguese galleon launched in 1663. She was considered to be the biggest ship of her time, carrying 144 pieces of artillery with a displacement up to 2,000 tons.
- San Juan Bautista (originally called Date Maru, 伊達丸 in Japanese). She crossed the Pacific Ocean from Japan to New Spain in 1614. She was of the Spanish galleon type, known in Japan as Nanban-Sen (南蛮船).
- San Salvador, flagship vessel in Juan Rodríguez Cabrillo's 1542 exploration of present-day California in the United States.
- Santa Luzia, a Portuguese galleon known for defeating a Dutch squadron single-handedly twice in 1650.
- Santa Teresa, a Portuguese galleon, the flagship of Admiral Lope de Hoces at the Battle of the Downs, in 1639.
- São João Baptista, nicknamed Botafogo, the most powerful warship in the world at the time when launched (1534) by the Portuguese; became famous during the Conquest of Tunis (1535), where it was commanded by Luís of Portugal, Duke of Beja.
- São Martinho, a Portuguese galleon, the flagship of Duke of Medina Sidonia, commander-in-chief of the Spanish Armada.
- Vasa, the only original galleon to be preserved. She sank in 1628 and was raised in 1961 for preservation as a museum ship.
- Ark Raleigh was designed and built by Sir Walter Raleigh. She was later chosen by Lord Howard, admiral of the fleet to be the flagship of the English fleet in the fight against the Spanish Armada in 1588 and was summarily renamed Ark Royal.
- San Pelayo, the large 906-ton galleon, which served as the flagship of Pedro Menéndez de Avilés during his expedition to establish St. Augustine, Florida in 1565. The vessel was so large it could not enter St. Augustine's harbor, so Menendez ordered it offloaded and sent it back to Hispaniola. At a later date her crew mutinied and sailed to Europe where the ship wrecked off the coast of Denmark.
- The Manila galleons, Spanish trading ships that sailed once or twice per year across the Pacific Ocean between Manila in the Philippines and Acapulco in New Spain (now Mexico); (1565–1815).

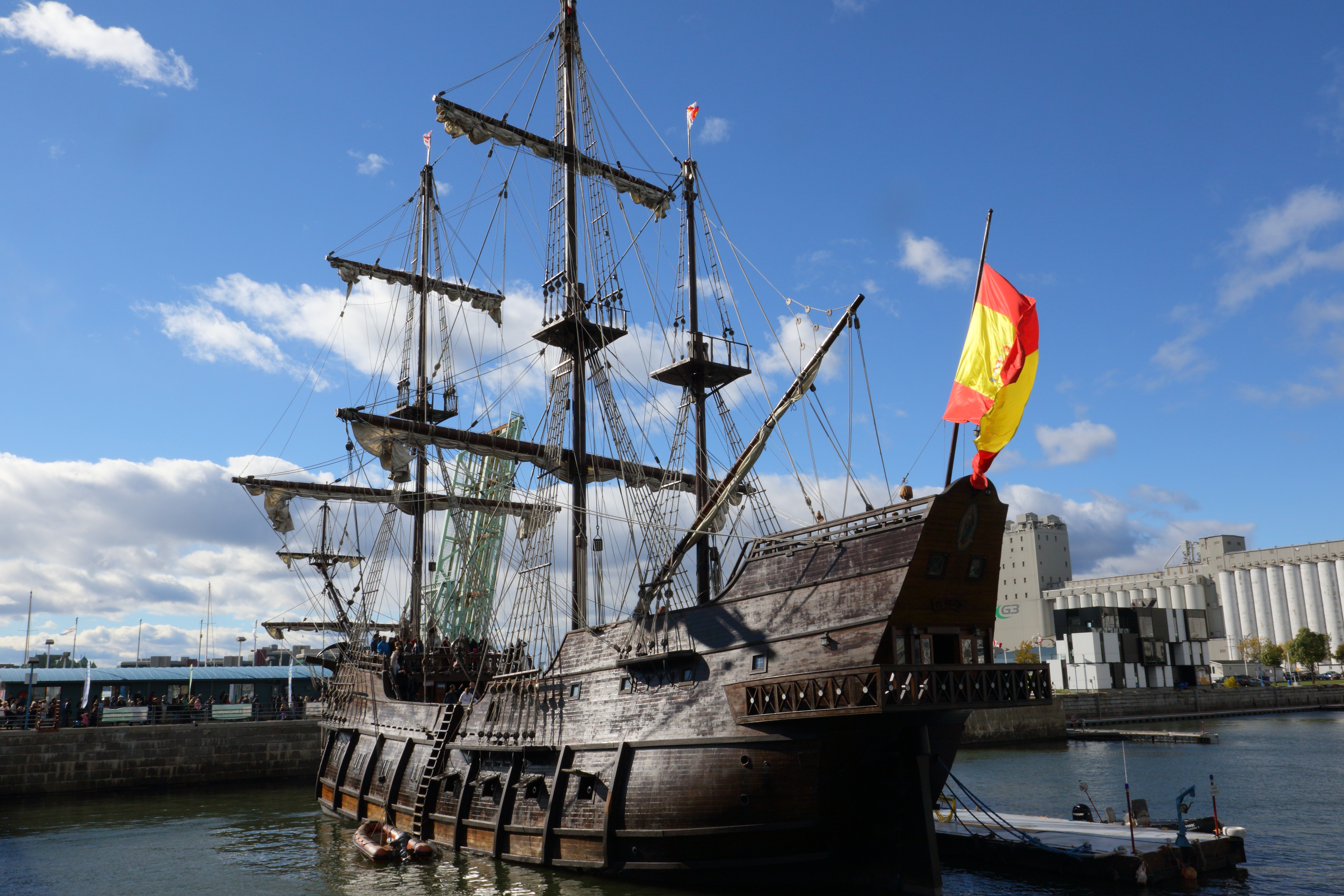
El Galeón, a 17th-century Spanish galleon replica in Quebec City in 2016.

== Bibliography ==
- Alertz, U. (1991) Vom Schiffbauhandwerk zur Schiffbautechnik : die Entwicklung neuer Entwurfs- und Konstruktionsmethoden im italienischen Galeerenbau (1400–1700), Hamburg : Kovač, ISBN 3-925630-56-2
- Anderson, Roger Charles (1952). Naval wars in the Levant, 1559-1853. Princeton University Press.
- Corbett, Julian (2007). England in the Mediterranean: A Study of the Rise and Influence of British Power Within the Straits, 1603-1713. Cosimo. ISBN 9781602062672.
- Humble, R. and Bergin, M. (1993) A 16th century galleon, Inside story series, Hemel Hempstead : Simon & Schuster, ISBN 0-7500-1339-7
- Kirsch, P. (1990) The Galleon: the great ships of the Armada era, London : Conway Maritime, ISBN 0-85177-546-2
- Rutland, J. (1988) A galleon, 2nd rev. ed., Connaty, M. (ed.), London : Kingfisher, ISBN 0-86272-327-2
- Serrano Mangas, F. (1992) Función y evolución del galeón en la carrera de Indias, Colección Mar y América 9, Madrid : Editorial MAPFRE, ISBN 84-7100-285-X
- Rodríguez González, Agustín Ramón (2021). Lepanto, la batalla decisiva (in Spanish). Spain: Sekotia Ediciones. ISBN 978-84-1675-090-0.
