= Wager's Action off Cartagena =

Painting by Samuel Scott

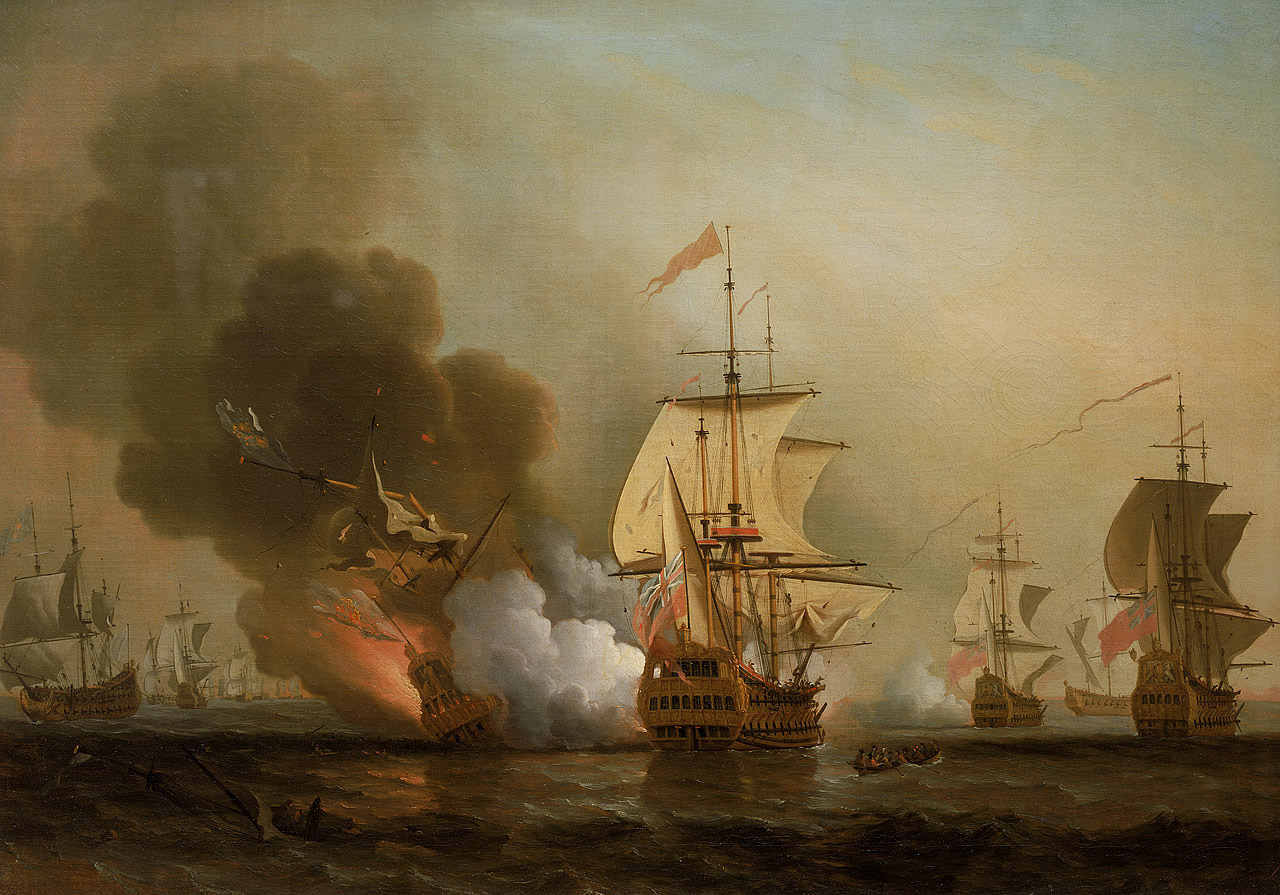
- Artist: Samuel Scott
- Year: c. 1747
- Type: Oil on canvas, history painting
- Dimensions: 86.3 cm × 124.4 cm (34.0 in × 49.0 in)
- Location: National Maritime Museum, Greenwich

Wager's Action off Cartagena is an oil on canvas seascape history painting by the English artist Samuel Scott in c. 1747. It depicts Wager's Action in 1708, a naval a battle during the War of the Spanish Succession when the Royal Navy under Admiral Charles Wager attacked and sank ships of the Spanish treasure fleet.

It was painted between 1743 and 1747, at a time when Britain and Spain were again in conflict during the War of the Austrian Succession. Centuries later the sunken galleon San José became a contentious issue as several countries staked a claim to the wreck as a treasure trove. The painting is in the National Maritime Museum in Greenwich.

== Bibliography ==
- Black, Jeremy. Britain As A Military Power, 1688-1815. Routledge, 2002.
- Sanderson, Michael, W.B. Sea Battles: A Reference Guide. David and Charles, 1975.
