= Convention on the Protection of the Underwater Cultural Heritage =

Treaty adopted on 2 November 2001

- Drafted: 2 November 2001
- Location: Paris, France
- Effective: 2 January 2009
- Parties: 80
- Depositary: Director-General of the United Nations Educational, Scientific and Cultural Organization
- Languages: Arabic, English, Chinese, French, Spanish and Russian

The Convention on the Protection of the Underwater Cultural Heritage is a treaty that was adopted on 2 November 2001 by the General Conference of the United Nations Educational, Scientific and Cultural Organization (UNESCO). The convention is intended to protect "all traces of human existence having a cultural, historical or archaeological character" which have been under water for over 100 years. This extends to the protection of shipwrecks, sunken cities, prehistoric art work, treasures that may be looted, sacrificial and burial sites, and old ports that cover the oceans' floors. The preservation of underwater cultural heritage is significant as it allows for the retelling of numerous historical events. As part of its duty to conduct scientific research and provide continuous education on the importance of underwater cultural heritage, UNESCO strives to maintain these sites for the enjoyment of current and future generations. The convention may provide a customary framework to help raise awareness and seek to combat the illegal looting and pirating occurring in waters worldwide. As an international body, member states of the convention agree to work towards the preservation of sunken cultural property within their jurisdiction and the high seas.

== Cultural heritage ==
As an international body, UNESCO continues to work towards the preservation of cultural goods worldwide. Similar to cultural property, only physical goods that are bestowed to future generations may fall into the protection of cultural heritage. It is thus a form of inheritance that allows current and future generations to learn about significant historical events. Particular to the concept of heritage, international agreements exist under the Council of Europe such as the 1885 Convention on the Protection of Archaeological Heritage of Europe and the European Convention on the Protection of Archaeological Heritage. These bodies create broad legal protections around cultural heritage antiquities and sites that are specific to communities worldwide. The 1954 Hague Convention was truly the first international convention that attempted to discuss the protection of cultural heritage. In defining property that is considered 'important' and 'valuable' for the good of the people, the issue of protecting cultural property became noticeable to international parties. It was only in the 1972 UNESCO Convention concerning the Protection of the World Cultural and Natural Heritage, that the term 'cultural heritage' was employed to define the cultural objects to be protected at an international level. However, due to its expansive definition, the concept of cultural heritage was further revised in the 1992 European Convention on the Protection of Archaeological Heritage. They serve to assert the universal value of protecting cultural objects that make up the history and identity of nations.

Along with the 100-year limitation period, the 2001 UNESCO Convention included the phrase 'cultural, historical or archaeological character' as the qualifying concepts that define underwater cultural heritage. Because many objects of cultural heritage lose their significance when taken out of water, this convention seeks to ensure the preservation of sunken sites.

== Content ==
Official text

The official text of the convention sets out the obligations of the states parties in regards to the protection of underwater cultural heritage, defined in Article 1 as:

"all traces of human existence having a cultural, historical or archaeological character which have been partially or totally under water, periodically or continuously, for at least 100 years"

Articles 1–4 define the Convention and its objectives, as well as its relation to the United Nations Convention on the Law of the Sea (UNCLOS) and the law of salvage.

Articles 5–12 define varying levels of obligations and procedures within the four maritime zones (Territorial Sea, Contiguous Zone, Exclusive Economic Zone, The Area) defined by UNCLOS.

Articles 13–21 define further obligations, such as seizing illicitly recovered underwater cultural heritage, cooperating with other state parties, and providing training in underwater archaeology.

Articles 22–35 clarify a number of points relevant to the functional aspects of the Convention, such as the creation of statutory bodies, the settlement of disputes between states parties, and modes of ratification.

Annex

In addition to the official text of the convention, an annex of 36 rules governs the practical aspects of activities directed at underwater cultural heritage. State parties are required to ensure that these rules are applied within their territorial sea and contiguous zone, and also that they are adhered to by all nationals and flag vessels.

Rules 1–8 define general principles. Key among these are the complete prohibition of the commercial exploitation of underwater cultural heritage and the principle that in situ preservation should always be considered as a first option. The rules also cover aspects such as project design, conservation, documentation, and reporting.

== International law ==
Situated between admiralty/private maritime law, the law of the sea, and cultural heritage law, the legal framework of underwater cultural heritage law is robust. Admiralty law is a branch entrenched within private international law relating to the control of maritime practices between private entities. Activities that fall under the protection of admiralty law include marine operations, marine salvaging, shipping and receiving. Subject to the common law jurisdiction and handled within domestic court systems, the body of admiralty law seeks to protect the rights and interests of private parties, with respect to practices at sea. On a broader level, this law seeks to fulfil public policy objectives including the safety of life and property, while ensuring the protection of the global marine environments.

The public international law body of the law of the sea was established to manage inter-state relations regarding practices in international waters. This complex body of law has grown to develop its own principles, particular methods of enforcement and Tribunals. Its primary objective is to create a supportive legal framework to determine the rights and duties of states with respect to their use of the ocean.

In 1982, the United Nations Convention on the Law of the Sea (UNCLOS) was developed to govern the deep-sea beds vis-à-vis increasing commercial exploitation of sunken objects. In light of the emergence of newly independent states, a need was created for an international legal body that would help protect underwater cultural goods, in waters used by many parties worldwide. Resulting from the third United Nations Conference on the Law of the Sea (UNCLOS III) between 1973 and 1982, the Convention has created many new regulations applicable to nation states. Once signed, the Convention had established two maritime zones with governing international regulations, affixed the maximum depth-level at sea at twelve miles, created specific regimes for international and archipelagic states, and introduced three new international institutions.

The 2001 UNESCO Convention on the Protection of Underwater Cultural Heritage is a product of international agreement on the adequate conduct of member states at sea. Its legal framework stems from two distinct sections of UNCLOS, including article 149 and 303.

Article 149 of UNCLOS provides that: " All objects of an archaeological and historical nature found in the Area shall be preserved or disposed of for the benefit of mankind as a whole, particular regard being paid to the preferential rights of the State or country of origin, or the State of cultural origin, or the State of historical and archaeological origin."

Article 303 of UNCLOS states that: "1. States have the duty to protect objects of an archaeological and historical nature found at sea and shall cooperate for this purpose.

2. In order to control traffic on such objects, the coastal State may, in applying article 33, presume that their removal from the seabed in the zone referred to in that article without its approval would result in an infringement within its territory or territorial sea of the laws and regulations referred to in that article.

3. Nothing in this article affects the rights of identifiable owners, the law of salvage or other rules of admiralty, or laws or practices with respect to cultural heritage.

4. This article is without prejudice to other international agreements and rules of international law regarding the protection of objects of an archaeological and historical nature."

To ensure that member states abide by the regulations stipulated within the Convention, they are to further adopt the following;

1 Each Party is to adopt domestic legislation that prohibits nationals and vessels from engaging in activities that would purposely interfere with the protection of underwater cultural heritage

2 Each Party is to require that all nationals and vessels report any new discoveries to UNESCO and fellow member states that are considered to be a part of underwater cultural heritage located in the Exclusive Economic Zone (EEZ), the Continental shelf and Area

3 Each Party is to take appropriate measures to prevent the dealing of objects considered to be underwater cultural heritage. This includes the illicit sale or exportation, as well as trade or seizing of the object found in their territory.

== Significant cases ==
A recorded 22 earthquakes between 320 and 1303 AD on the coast of Pharos in Egypt shook the city of Alexandria, which was home to Pharos Lighthouse. The effects of these earthquakes, and several more in the centuries that followed suggest that the large monument may have fallen into the sea, leaving massive blocks of stone awaiting the exploration mission led by archaeologist Jean-Yves Empereur in 1994. While many components of the old lighthouse are on display at the Kom el-Dikka museum in Alexandria, archaeologists suggest that around 500 pieces remain on the sea floor. Today, the Alexandria Lighthouse is one of the seven wonders of the ancient world.

On 19 July 1545, the British ship known as the Mary Rose sunk to the bottom of the Portsmouth Harbour, in the United Kingdom. While its failures still remain a mystery, is estimated that at least 500 men were trapped in the ship, and only 35 of these escaped to safety In 1982, sixty million people watched as the vessel was lifted out of its resting place, with its 19,000 discovered objects still intact. Due to the preservation of this monument of underwater cultural heritage in the Mary Rose museum, the public can continue to enjoy the vessel and all of her artifacts.

Off the coast of Sweden in 1628, the pride of the Swedish Navy, the Vasa sunk deep beneath the frigid waters of the Baltic Sea. Under the orders of King Gustavus II Adolphus, the immense vessel was built to support Swedish military campaigns during the Thirty Years' War, yet was toppled by swift winds at sea. The Vasa remained peacefully underwater until a team of archaeologists raised the wreck in 1961. Fortunately, the wreck and all of its belongings were salvaged, despite its lengthily time spent on the ocean floor. Today, the Swedish Vasa museum in Stockholm is an emblem of cultural heritage, dedicated to educating public citizens worldwide.

In 1985, a team of scientists discovered the RMS Titanic in the northern waters of the Atlantic Ocean off the coast of Newfoundland, Canada 1,800 artifacts were found in the wreck site, deeming the discovery a very important contribution to the field of Underwater Cultural Heritage The Titanic has raised significant questions surrounding the remaining passengers, the value of the wreck and the items lost therein, as well as the impact of the accident The discovery of the ship, and other sunken wrecks, may have also raised questions about the legal framework of the UNESCO Convention on the Protection of Underwater Cultural Heritage.

== Pirating and looting ==
As early as the sixth century BC, as Rome gained control over the Greek colonies of Italy and aligned itself with the western states, it developed a fleet that would allow the state to become the most powerful naval entity. Due to the lawless waters along the eastern coasts of Italy, this area was prevalent in pirating. Modern scholars refer to this area as being "inhabited by wild, uncivilized tribes, who were active marauders of the land and sea, and were constantly reinforced from the interior". While many dispute the accounts of these events, the marauding nature of pirates may continue to remain true today. Although naval warfare has decreased in popularity, modern pirates are now turning to alternatives to attain their desired treasures.

Today, it is estimated that three million undiscovered shipwrecks and ruins continue to lie at the bottom of the oceans. With the introduction and growing popularity of scuba-diving since the 1940s, the accessibility of such underwater cultural heritage sites are becoming easier to modern pirates in search of new treasure. Studies have already shown that as of 1974, all known shipwrecks off the coasts of Turkey have been exploited by underwater pirates. Additionally, Israeli archaeologists estimate that at least 60 per cent of cultural objects that once lay in wrecks and sites have now disappeared without any trace. Due to the sheer mass of the world's oceans and the inability to monitor all activity that takes place therein, pirates and underwater thieves continue to pose a significant threat to the preservation of cultural heritage and cultural property.

In 2006, the UNESCO Convention was ratified by an additional state, Portugal, needing international protection for the looting of its underwater cultural heritage sites. At least six international treasure hunting organizations had established themselves off the coasts of Portugal to reap the benefits of the nation's coastline after new legislation had allowed for the sale of artifacts collected underwater during archaeological excavations in 1993. Due to this, physical goods may have been looted without proper care, damaging the cultural property that was left behind. Not only did Portugal face a loss of cultural goods, but also possible facts about its historical events. Today, Portugal is one of the nations that is protected by the body of the UNESCO Convention, wherein the commercial exploitation and dispersion are legally banned, and underwater archeological sites and wrecks are preserved for the future.

== Criticisms ==
Abstaining from signing the 2001 UN Convention, the United States has stipulated that the term "all traces of human existence" is too broad, legally and as a mechanism tool for the protection of underwater cultural heritage for the preservation of future generations. The United Kingdom also holds this concern. The UNESCO Convention has also been criticised by some States for seemingly eroding the sovereign immunity principle and for being incompatible with UNCLOS provisions, despite evidence to the contrary.

A criticism of the UNCLOS articles is that they are considered ambiguous and obscure in nature. Article 149 fails to specify the manner in which objects of an archaeological nature are to be preserved of and disposed, as well as which mechanisms should be instituted in their conservation so as to benefit all current and future generations

With the discovery of the Spanish galleon San José by the Colombian Government, and in an effort to claim the galleon with all its cargo, the Spanish Government tried to use the convention as a measure to stop Colombia from salvaging the ship. Article 13 recognises sovereign immunity over sunken warships, but Colombia is not a participating member of the Convention. Separately, Colombia has called the galleon part of its submerged patrimony so it is constitutionally bound to protect and preserve the warship.

== Parties ==
Parties to the UNESCO 2001 Convention on the Protection of the Underwater Cultural Heritage, as of February 2015

As of August 2025, the treaty has 80 states parties.

== See also ==
- Underwater archaeology
- Maritime archaeology
