= Santa Luzia (galleon) =

Portuguese galleon

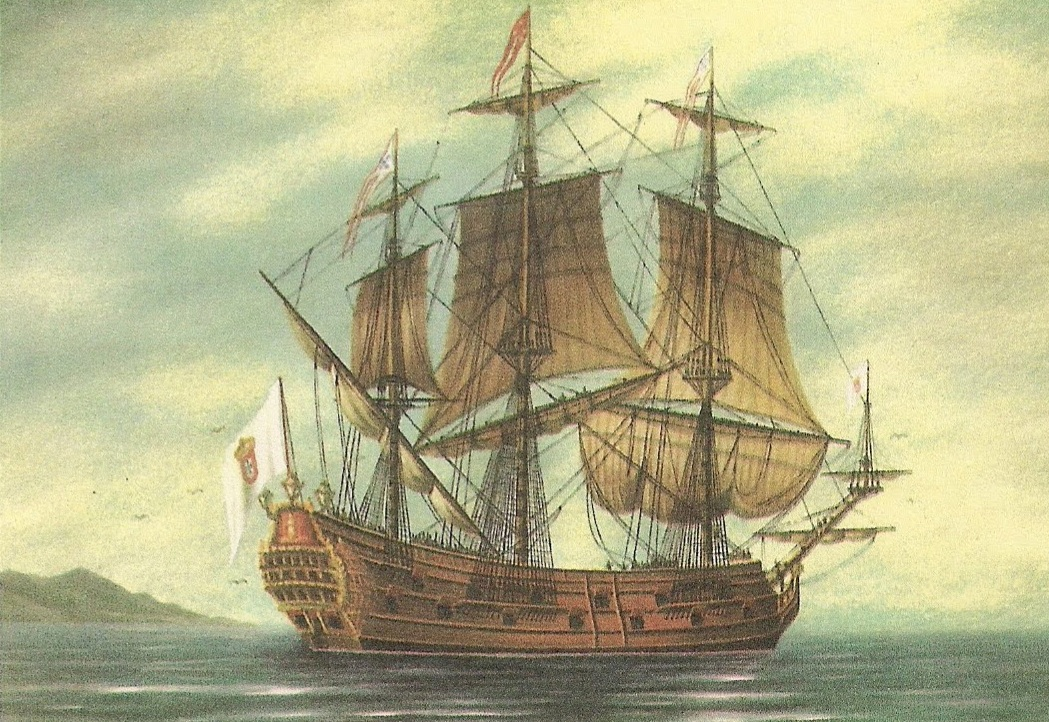
- The galleon Santa Luzia by Alberto Cutileiro

History

Portugal
- Name: Santa Luzia
- Namesake: Saint Lucy

General characteristics
- Type: Galleon
- Tons burthen: 360 tonnes
- Sail plan: Full-rigged ship
- Armament: 30 guns

Santa Luzia was a 30-gun and 360-tonne Portuguese galleon, known for defeating a Dutch squadron single-handedly twice in 1650.

== Service history ==
Santa Luzia was probably built for the General Company of Brazil.

On 21 February 1650, off Cabo de Santo Agostinho, Santa Luzia, under the command of Bernardo Ramires Esquível, was attacked by a squadron of nine Dutch ships, commanded by Caspar Govertsz Cop. Santa Luzia defended himself with a violent artillery duel, that lasted until the night. After the combat, Santa Luzia anchored near the coast, in order to take care of the wounded and repair the damage suffered.

On 22 February, in the morning, the combat returned. Maneuvering ably, Esquível did not cease fire on the Dutch ships that approached the Santa Luzia, causing a lot of damage and casualties. Possibly because they did not have enough soldiers, the Dutch ships did not attempt to board the Santa Luzia. By the mid-afternoon, having come to the conclusion that they could not defeat the Santa Luzia, Cop put an end to the fight by retreating to the north.

Santa Luzia's fate after this is unknown.
