= Spanish galleon San José =

Galleon of the Spanish Navy

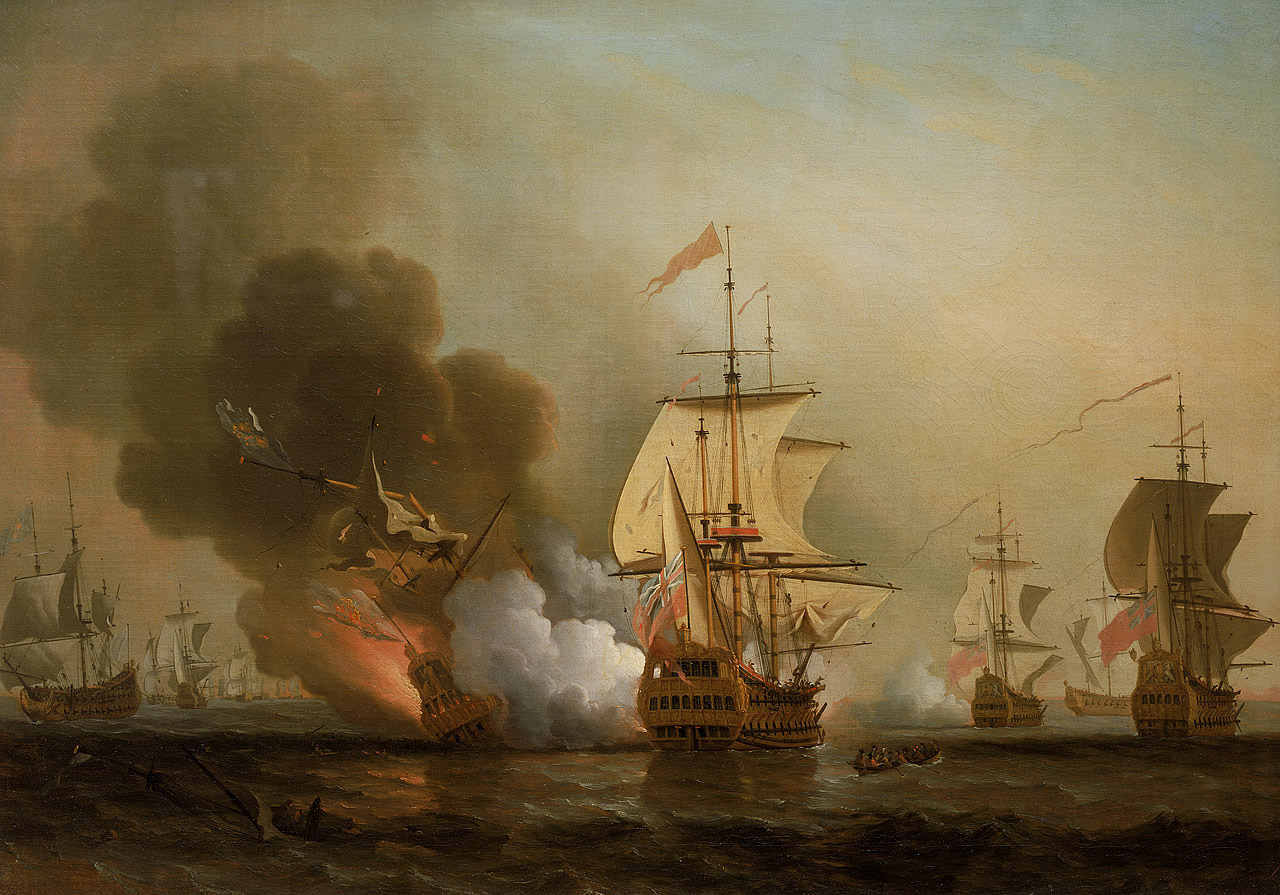
- San José (centre-left) exploding during Wager's Action

History

Spain
- Name: San José
- Builder: Pedro Arostegui (contractor), Mapil (Usurbil)
- Laid down: 1697
- Launched: 1698
- Fate: Sunk during the Battle of Barú (Wager's Action), 8 June 1708. 9.5833°N 76.2569°W

General characteristics
- Type: Galleon
- Tons burthen: 1,051 tons
- Length: 71.00 codos (of 418 mm) lower deck length; 60.18 codos (of 418 mm) keel length (Note: A 'codo común' (=418 mm) was similar to a cubit in Castile.)
- Beam: 21.91 codos
- Draught: 11.75 codos estimated
- Depth of hold: 10 codos
- Propulsion: Sails
- Armament: 64 guns: Lower gundeck: 26 × 18-pounders; Middle gundeck: 26 × 10-pounders; Quarterdeck and Forecastle: 12 × 6-pounders

San José was a 64-gun galleon of the Spanish Navy, commissioned by the Spanish Crown and built in the Basque Country of Spain. Launched in 1698, she served as a flagship of the Spanish treasure fleet during the War of the Spanish Succession and sank in battle off Barú Island, near Cartagena, Colombia, on 8 June 1708. The sinking killed nearly all of the approximately 600 Spanish sailors and officers serving aboard under orders of the Spanish Crown, making the wreck both a significant underwater cultural heritage site and a war grave of the Spanish state. The ship's cargo of gold, silver and emeralds is estimated to be worth about US$17 billion as of 2023.

The sunken Spanish warship was located at a depth of 600 metres in November 2015. Its discovery triggered an international ownership dispute, with Spain asserting sovereign rights over the vessel as a commissioned warship of the Spanish Navy, and Colombia claiming it as submerged national patrimony under domestic legislation. Colombia has not ratified the United Nations Convention on the Law of the Sea (UNCLOS) or the UNESCO Convention on the Protection of the Underwater Cultural Heritage, both of which support the principle that sunken state vessels retain the sovereign immunity of their flag state. Additional claims include salvage company Sea Search Armada and indigenous groups from Bolivia.

Since July 2017, a joint scientific operation led by the Ministry of Culture of Colombia, the Colombian Institute of Anthropology and History, the Colombian Navy, and the General Maritime Directorate of Colombia is being conducted to explore and study the site of the shipwreck and retrieve its contents for a future museum to be established in the city of Cartagena, Colombia.

== Career ==
San José was designed by Francisco Antonio Garrote and built by Pedro de Aróstegui at the shipyard in Mapil, Usurbil, Gipuzkoa, in the Basque Country of Spain. Construction started in 1697 and ended in 1698. The shipyard built twin ships simultaneously for the Spanish Crown, naming them San José and San Joaquín.

San José and San Joaquín were part of the Spanish treasure fleet during the War of the Spanish Succession, under General José Fernández de Santillán, the Count of Casa Alegre. The fleet was tasked with transporting precious metals and gemstones from Spain's American territories to the Iberian Peninsula to finance the Spanish Crown's war effort.

On its final voyage, San José sailed as the flagship of a treasure fleet composed of three Spanish warships and 14 merchant vessels sailing from Portobelo, Panama, to Cartagena, Colombia. The Spanish vessels carried gold, silver, emeralds and jewelry collected from the Viceroyalty of Peru, including silver and gold mined at Potosí in present-day Bolivia. On 8 June 1708, the fleet encountered a British squadron near Barú, leading to a battle known as Wager's Action. During the battle, the powder magazines of San José detonated, destroying and sinking the Spanish warship along with the gold, silver, emeralds and jewelry intended for the Spanish king's treasury. Of the approximately 600 Spanish sailors and officers serving aboard under orders of the Spanish Crown, only 11 survived. The remaining crew perished in the service of Spain, and their remains are believed to lie with the wreck.

== Search and discovery ==
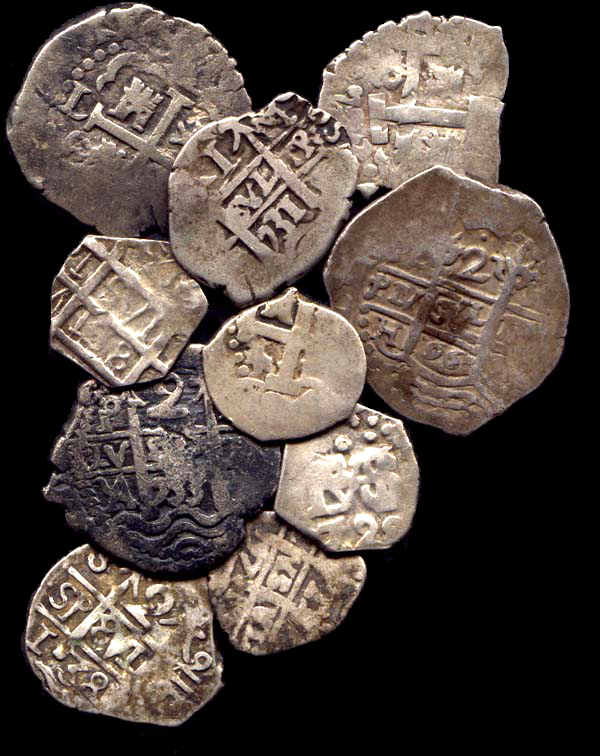
Macuquinas, manually minted silver coins from the 16th to 18th century

The wreck of the Spanish galleon San José is estimated to be worth billions of dollars. This is based on the speculation that, similar to its surviving Spanish sister ship, San Joaquín, it had 11 million pesos in coins on board at the time of its sinking, worth up to $17 billion as of 2023. The silver and gold are from the mines of Potosí, Bolivia. The enormous value of the cargo destined for the Spanish Crown has led to San José being called the "Holy Grail of Shipwrecks".

Glocca Mora Co., a group of investors from the United States, claimed to have found the Spanish shipwreck off the coast of Colombia in 1981. Operating under the name Sea Search Armada (SSA), the group was spearheaded by noted historian Dr. Eugene Lyon, best known for having located and positively identified La Nuestra Senora de la Atocha, among others.

Colombia says the ship was not at the claimed coordinates, refused to sign a 65%/35% share offer, and refused SSA permission to conduct full salvage operations at the wreck site. The Colombian parliament then passed a law giving the state the right to all of the treasure, leaving SSA with a 5% finder's fee, which was to be taxed at 45%. SSA sued Colombia in Colombian courts in 1989. In July 2007, the Supreme Court of Colombia concluded that any treasure recovered would be split equally between the Colombian government and the explorers. Sea Search Armada subsequently sued in United States courts, but the case was dismissed twice, in 2011 and 2015 on technical grounds, and a Colombian court declared the galleon the property of the Colombian state.

On 27 November 2015, the Spanish galleon San José was found in a different place by the Colombian Navy, announced by then President of Colombia Juan Manuel Santos on 5 December. The discovery was made using a REMUS 6000 autonomous underwater vehicle. From the dive photographs, marine archaeologists identified the Spanish vessel by her bronze guns, cast in Spain with distinctive dolphin motifs. Colombia claimed the Spanish galleon as part of its submerged patrimony, a position Spain immediately disputed, asserting its sovereign rights over the warship. The government of Colombia classified the location of the Spanish galleon as a state secret, effectively preventing Spain and other claimants from independently verifying the site or participating in its examination.

In 2022, Sea Search Armada filed suit at the Permanent Court of Arbitration reasserting its rights to the treasure, claiming that the supposed later Colombian discovery in a new, secret location, was actually in the same location discovered by SSA, and was merely a ruse to invalidate previous claims.

In June 2025, a study published in the journal Antiquity confirmed the identity of the wreck through analysis of 300-year-old coins minted at the Lima Mint in 1707, consistent with a Spanish vessel navigating the Tierra Firme route in the early 18th century.

== Conservation and recovery ==
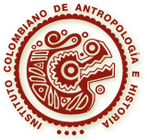
Logo of the Colombian Institute of Anthropology and History (ICANH)

The conservation and recovery of the Spanish galleon San José and its contents has been a subject of international concern, particularly given Spain's position that as the flag state of a sovereign warship, it should be consulted and its consent obtained before any intervention on the wreck. The UNESCO Convention on the Protection of the Underwater Cultural Heritage (2001) provides that the flag state of a sunken warship must be notified and consulted regarding any activities directed at the vessel, and that the flag state's rights — including sovereign immunity — must be respected.

The Colombian Institute of Anthropology and History (ICANH), a government agency under the Ministry of Culture, has overseen archaeological activities at the site of the Spanish shipwreck. The director of the ICANH, Ernesto Montenegro, stated that soil and sea depth studies were being carried out to examine extraction methods for the Spanish ship's contents. Then Colombian president Juan Manuel Santos announced plans to construct a museum in Cartagena to host contents recovered from the Spanish galleon, without publicly addressing Spain's claim as the vessel's flag state or seeking bilateral agreement.

On 16 December 2015, the Office of the Inspector General of Colombia requested that the State keep thorough archives of the exploration, to be given to the Ministry of Culture. The Inspector General also requested that a representative sample of the coins, ingots, and gemstones, not classified as cultural patrimony due to repetition, be given to the Banco de la República for preservation.

=== First phase ===
In February 2024, Colombia announced plans to begin recovering artefacts from the wreck of the shipwreck. In May 2024, the first stage of an underwater research project began using robotic vehicles to survey the site of the shipwreck.

=== Second phase ===
In November 2025, Colombian authorities announced the first physical recovery of artefacts from the Spanish warship. Colombian President Gustavo Petro was present for the inspection of the items recovered from the Spanish vessel.

The recovered items from the exploratory phase included:

3 macuquina coins of gold and copper
2 whole porcelain cups from the Qing dynasty era
2 porcelain fragments
1 bronze cannon
1 fragment of rope associated with the cannon
Sediment fragments of metal and wood from the bronze cannon

The recovered items are currently being preserved and studied at the Underwater Cultural Heritage Laboratory of the Caribbean Oceanographic and Hydrographic Research Center, located in Cartagena, and at the National Museum of Colombia in Bogotá.

== Ownership dispute ==
The Government of Colombia considers the dispute to be settled with the National Agency for the Legal Defense of the State claiming that the legal security of the San José Galleon is complete as the shipwreck is part of Colombia's national heritage. Nevertheless, other parties, including the Kingdom of Spain, have previously publicized claims with the later having proposed joint management of the shipwreck site.

=== Colombia ===
Per Colombian constitutional law, more specifically under articles 63 and 72, archaeological patrimony is inalienable, imprescriptible and unseizable, and that the nation's cultural heritage is under the protection and ownership of the State. Based on the aforementioned constitutional articles, article 2 of law 1675 (2013), established that underwater cultural heritage is part of the archaeological heritage and is therefore property of the Nation.

In 2019, under the Iván Duque administration, the Galleon San José was declared as a cultural asset of the Nation which prevented any salvaging efforts to be paid for with part of its cargo. Furthermore, in 2024 under the Gustavo Petro administration, the site of San José shipwreck was declared a protected archaeological area that counts with an underwater archaeological management plan.

=== Indigenous communities ===
The indigenous Qhara Qhara people of Bolivia have also asserted a claim to the treasure aboard the Spanish galleon, arguing that the gold and silver were extracted through the forced labour of their ancestors at the Cerro Rico mines of Potosí. They have called upon Spain and UNESCO to declare the galleon's cargo as shared heritage.

=== Sea Search Armada ===
Sea Search Armada (SSA), a United States-based salvage company, claims to have first located the wreck of the Spanish galleon in 1981 and has pursued legal action against Colombia for decades (see above). In 2022, SSA filed a case at the Permanent Court of Arbitration in The Hague, seeking approximately US$10 billion in compensation.

=== Spain ===
Spain maintains that San José was a commissioned warship of the Spanish Navy, crewed by Spanish sailors serving under orders of the Spanish Crown, carrying cargo belonging to the Spanish state, and that it therefore remains sovereign property of Spain regardless of its current location. Spain's position is grounded in the principle, widely recognised in international law, that sunken state vessels retain their sovereign immunity. This principle is supported by the United Nations Convention on the Law of the Sea (UNCLOS), which provides that warships and other government vessels operated for non-commercial purposes enjoy sovereign immunity. Colombia is not a party to UNCLOS.

Spain has previously invoked the UNESCO Convention on the Protection of the Underwater Cultural Heritage (2001), which establishes that state vessels sunk while in service should not be commercially exploited and that the flag state retains preferential rights, including the right to be consulted before any activities are directed at the vessel. Spain has requested UNESCO involvement in the matter. Colombia has not ratified this convention either. The Spanish government has additionally emphasised the significance of the wreck as a site where nearly 600 Spanish sailors lost their lives in the service of the Spanish Crown, giving the vessel both cultural and memorial importance to Spain as a war grave.

In May 2019, the Spanish Ministry of Foreign Affairs issued a statement in which it welcomed Colombia's commitment to the preservation of underwater cultural heritage for the benefit of humanity and its renunciation of any form of commercial exploitation of the San José.

In February 2024, the Spanish ambassador to Colombia publicly expressed Spain's willingness to pursue a bilateral agreement and conduct joint investigations on the wreck.

== In popular culture ==
The discovery of the galleon San José inspired Colombian writer Marco T. Robayo to create a historical graphic novel, A la caza del Galeón San José: el naufragio, published by Planeta Colombia in 2022. The sinking is mentioned in Gabriel García Márquez's 1985 novel Love in the Time of Cholera.

== See also ==
- Mesuno Treasure, a treasure from a shipwreck also discovered in Colombia
