= Wager's Action =

1708 battle of the War of the Spanish Succession

- Part of the War of the Spanish Succession
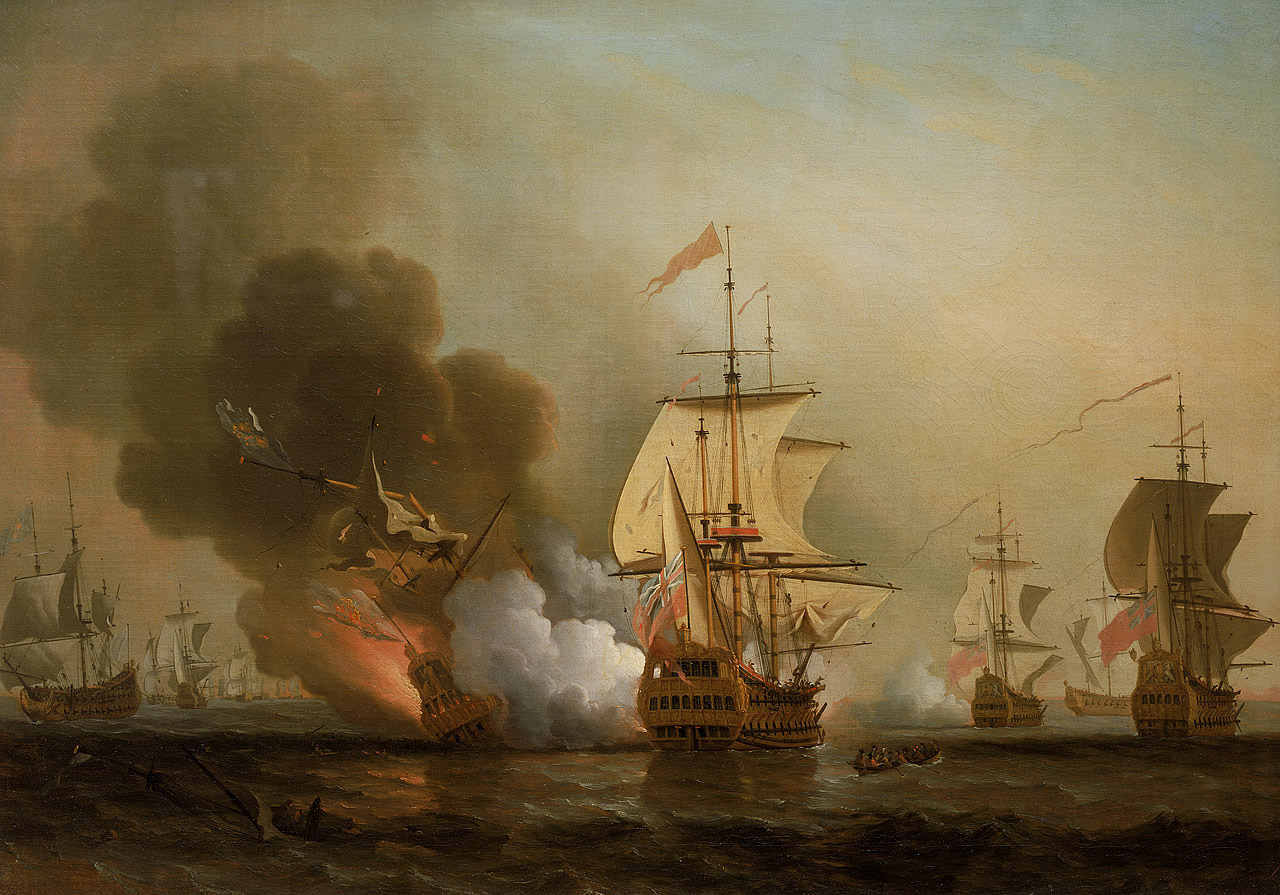
- Wager's Action off Cartagena; Samuel Scott, c. 1747
Date	8 June 1708
Location	Off Cartagena, Caribbean Sea 10.171°N 75.661°W
Result	British victory

Belligerents
Great Britain	Spain; France

Commanders and leaders
Charles Wager	José de Santillán †; Jean-Baptiste du Casse

Strength
3 ships of the line 1 fireship	3 galleons 1 hulk 14 merchant ships

Casualties and losses
14 killed	1,247 killed or wounded 1 galleon captured 1 galleon destroyed 1 hulk scuttled

Wager's Action was fought on 8 June 1708 between a Royal Navy squadron under Charles Wager and a Franco-Spanish convoy under José de Santillán and Jean-Baptiste du Casse as part of the War of the Spanish Succession. It ended in a British victory, with the Spanish losing two treasure galleons and suffering heavy casualties.

== Background ==
In the spring of 1708 Charles Wager was on an expedition in the Caribbean with a squadron of four ships:

- Expedition (70 guns), Captain Henry Long
- Kingston (60 guns), Captain Simon (Timothy) Bridges
- Portland (50 guns), Captain Edward Windsor
- Vulture (28 guns), fire ship under Commander Caesar Brooks

In April the squadron took in supplies on the small island of Pequeña Barú, part of the Rosario Islands, just 30 miles away from Cartagena. Here the Spanish were aware of their presence, and the governor of Cartagena sent warnings to the Franco-Spanish fleet, which was anchored in Portobelo, Colón.

Nevertheless, the commander of the treasure fleet, José Fernández de Santillán, decided to sail from Portobelo to Cartagena on 28 May. He could not wait much longer as the hurricane season was approaching and the rest of the fleet, plus their escort under Jean-Baptiste du Casse were waiting in Havana and threatened to leave without him.

The Spanish fleet was composed of fourteen merchant ships, a lightly armed hulk, and three escorting galleons:

- San José (64 guns), Captain José Fernández de Santillán
- San Joaquín (64 guns), Captain Villanueva
- Santa Cruz (44 guns), Captain de la Rosa

The gold and silver were concentrated on the 3 largest vessels. The San José had 7 to 11 million pesos on board, and the San Joaquín 5 million. The Santa Cruz had the rest, only a fraction of the other two ships.

== Battle ==
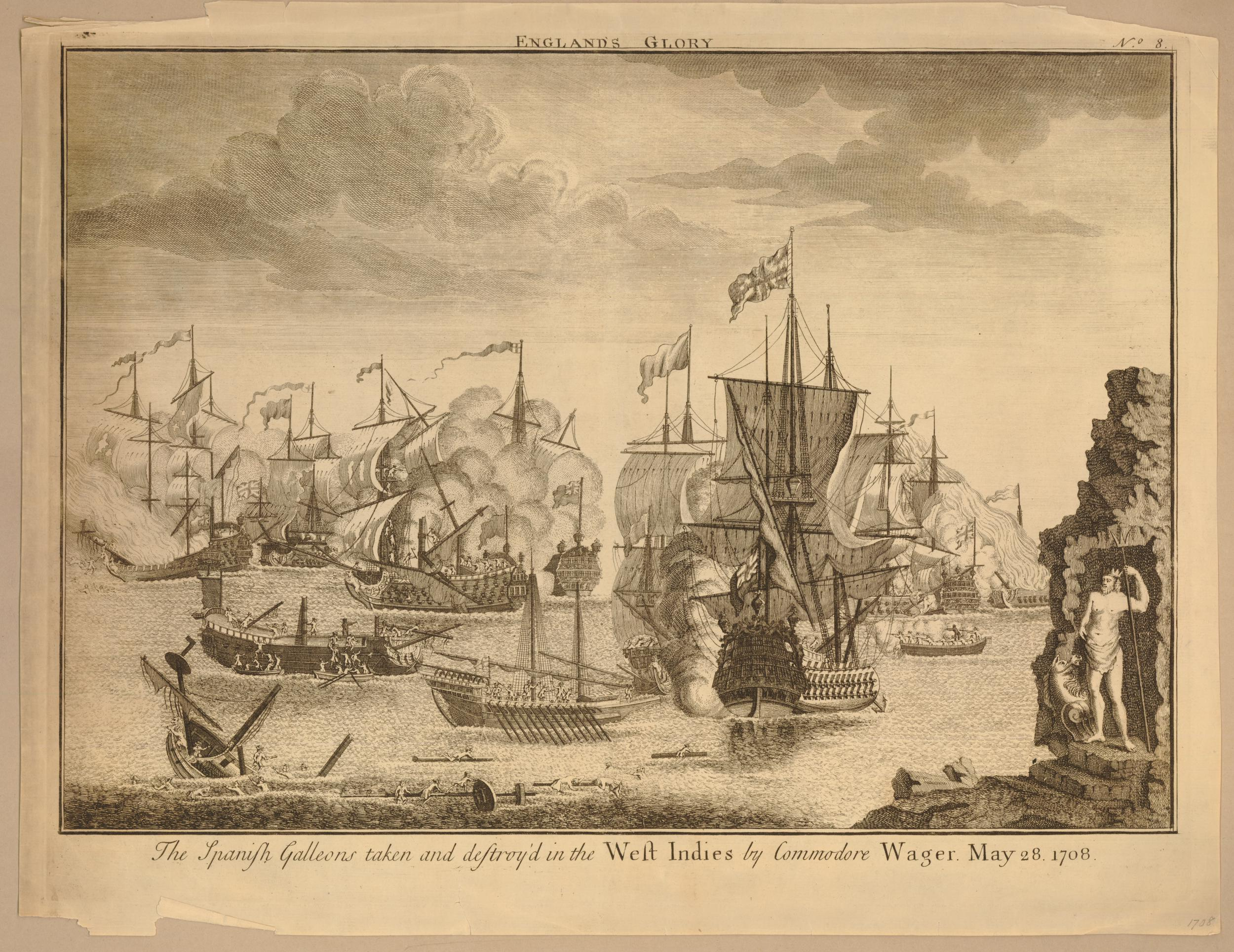
1738–1739 engraving of the battle

The Spanish fleet reached Isla Barú on the evening of 7 June and anchored there. On the next day there was very little wind, and around 3 p.m. they noticed Wager's squadron approaching. The Spanish took up defensive positions, but the British knew they had to attack the largest ships, because they had the most money on board. The Kingston attacked the San Joaquín around 5 p.m. which, after two hours of battle, escaped into the night with the help of the Concepción. The Expedition attacked the San José and approached the vessel with the clear intention of boarding the ship. Around 7 p.m., after an hour and a half of fierce fighting and with only 60 meters between the two ships, the San José suddenly blew up. The ship sank immediately, taking its precious cargo and almost the entire crew to the bottom of the sea. There were only 11 survivors out of the 600 crew and passengers on board; José Fernández de Santillán went down with his ship.

By now it was dark, but there was a full moon and Wager succeeded in finding the Santa Cruz at 2 a.m. After a brief fight, which left 14 British and 90 Spanish dead, the Santa Cruz was taken; however, she had no government treasure in her - only 13 chests of pieces of eight and 14 pigs of silver which seem to have been private property. At dawn, the British discovered the San Joaquín, and Wager ordered the Kingston and Portland to capture the ship. After a few salvos, however, the San Joaquín successfully made way towards Cartagena harbour, and the British decided against following them. The rest of the Spanish fleet also reached Cartagena safely, except the hulk Concepción which, cornered by the British, beached itself on Baru Island where the crew set the ship alight.

== Aftermath ==
The Royal Navy squadron had bested the three treasure galleons and prevented the Spanish fleet from transporting the gold and silver to Europe where it would have helped fund the Bourbon war effort in the War of the Spanish Succession. Although Charles Wager became a rich man, he was disappointed with the treasure captured because it could have been many times larger if they had captured the San Joaquín. Captains Bridges and Windsor were court-martialled for this failure.

=== Legacy ===
The estimated $1bn (£662m) treasure of the San José, which is still on the bottom of the ocean but located in 2015, is estimated to be worth about 4 billion US dollars based on the speculation that it likely had 7 million Spanish pesos in registered gold on board at the time of its sinking, similar to its surviving sister ship, the San Joaquín. The San José is called the "Holy Grail of Shipwrecks."

A group of investors from the United States called Glocca Mora Co. operating under the name "Sea Search Armada" (SSA) claim to have found the ship off the coast of Colombia in 1981, but Colombia refused to sign a 65%/35% share offer and refused SSA permission to conduct full salvage operations at the shipwreck site. The Colombian parliament then passed a law giving the state the right to all of the treasure, leaving SSA with a 5% finder's fee, which was to be taxed at 45%. SSA sued Colombia in its courts in 1989. The legal dispute over the rights to the treasure took a turn in July 2007 when the Supreme Court of Colombia concluded that any treasure recovered would be split equally between the Colombian government and the explorers. Sea Search Armada subsequently sued in US courts, but that case was dismissed twice, in 2011 and 2015 on technical grounds, and the US court declared the galleon property of the Colombian state. The Colombian government has not verified its existence at the stated coordinates.

On 27 November 2015, the galleon San José was found by the Colombian Navy, although the discovery was not announced by the President of Colombia, Juan Manuel Santos, until 5 December. The discovery was made using a REMUS 6000 autonomous underwater vehicle. The identity of the shipwreck is not in doubt. From the dive photographs, Colombian marine archaeologists have identified San José by her unique bronze cannons engraved with dolphins. Colombia has claimed the galleon as part of its submerged patrimony and has classified the information regarding the location of the galleon as a state secret.

In November 2023 the Colombian government are looking to recover the treasure. The following year in May Colombia began exploring the wreck in the first stage of a research project by the Colombian Institute of Anthropology and History using underwater robots to gather an inventory of the wreck site.
