= Portuguese galleon Padre Eterno =

Galleon of the Portuguese Navy

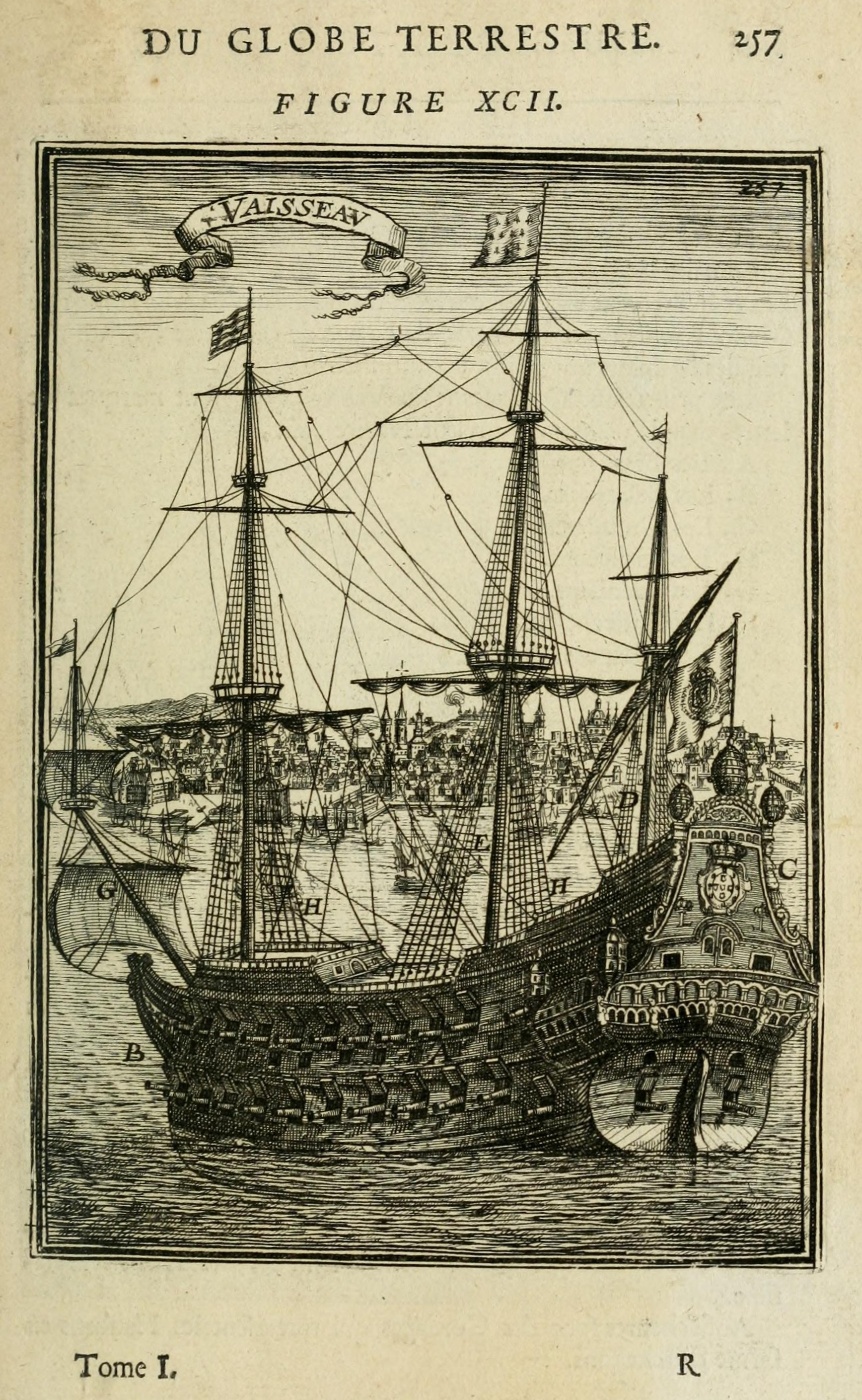
- Engraving of Padre Eterno in the Tagus River, in the book Description de l'Univers by Alain Manesson Mallet, 1683

History

Portugal
- Name: Padre Eterno
- Owner: Kingdom of Portugal
- Builder: Estaleiro do Galeão (Rio de Janeiro)
- Laid down: 1659
- Launched: December 1663
- Maiden voyage: 1665
- Status: Shipwrecked in the Indian Ocean

General characteristics
- Class & type: Galleon
- Displacement: 2,000 t
- Length: 73 m (239 ft 6 in)
- Armament: 144 pieces of artillery

Padre Eterno (meaning "Eternal Father" in English) was a galleon of the Portuguese Navy, built in Rio de Janeiro, State of Brazil in the 17th century, at the order of Salvador Corrêa de Sá e Benevides for transportation of sugar and goods for the Companhia Geral do Comércio. She was later sold to the Portuguese Crown.

According to the periodical Mercurio portuguez published in Lisbon between 1663 and 1667 by the State Secretary of the Kingdom António de Sousa de Macedo, she was considered the biggest ship of her time. She was indeed bigger than the English Sovereign of the Seas and the French Saint Philippe, but was of equal size of the Spanish La Salvadora, and smaller than the Swedish Kronan, and the French Soleil Royal. She arrived in Lisbon from her maiden voyage on 20 October 1665. She sank in the Indian Ocean a few years later.

The name of the international airport serving Rio de Janeiro, namely Rio de Janeiro/Galeão–Antonio Carlos Jobim International Airport has a reference to Galeão beach, located in the close vicinity of the original passenger terminal of the airport. The beach in turn got its name from the galleon, entirely built at this location.
