= Marco T. Robayo =

Colombian writer

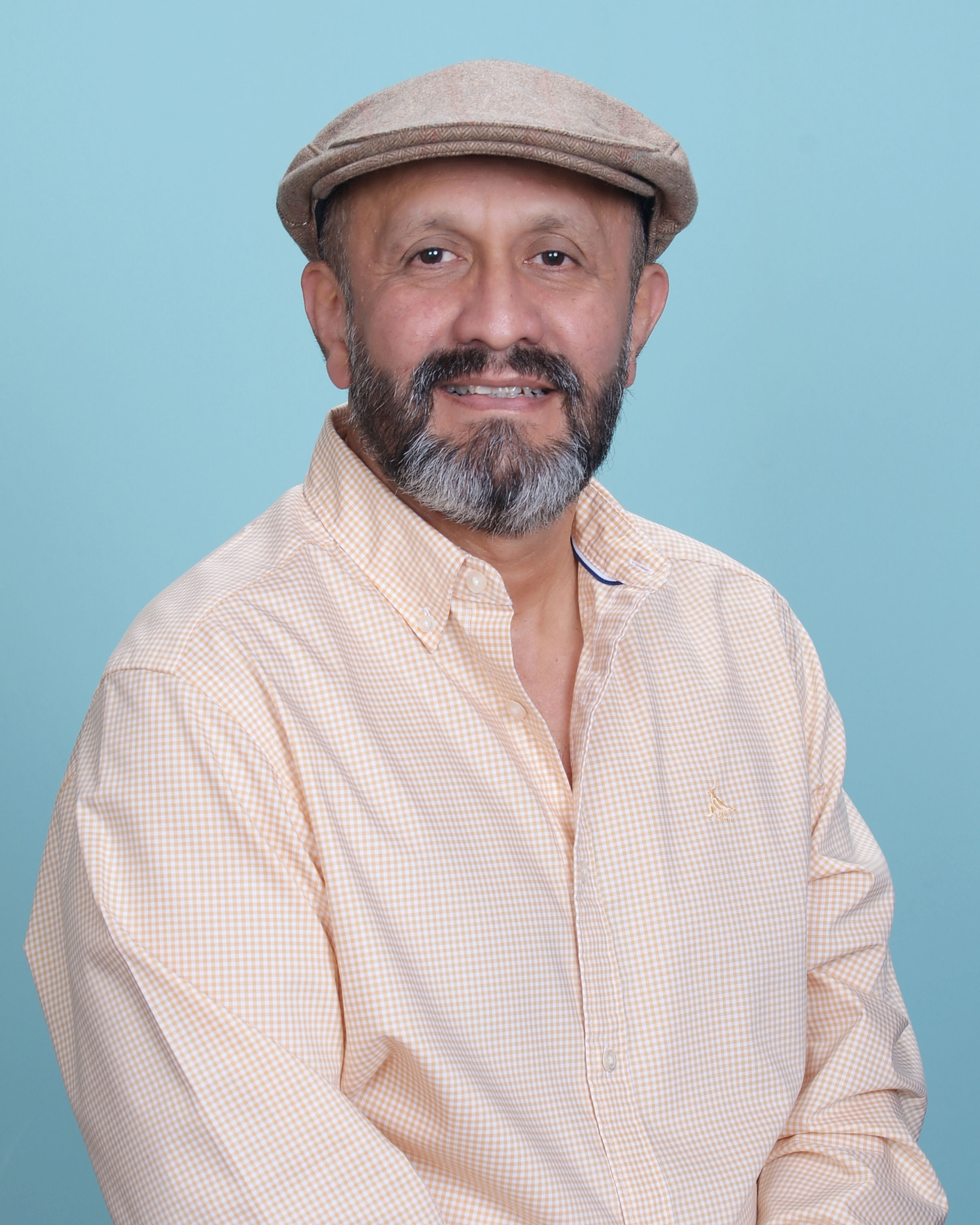
- Born: October 22, 1961 (age 64); Bogotá
- Education: Mechanical Engineering
- Occupations: Mechanical Engineer, Writer
- Spouse: Luz Mery
- Children: Carlos, Gisela, Viviana Alexandra y Angie Carolina
- Writing career
- Language: Spanish
- Notable work: Piel de ébano
- Website: marcorobayo.com

Marco T. Robayo (born October 22, 1961, Bogotá) is a Colombian writer based in Dallas, Texas. He is the author of Piel de ébano (Ebony skin, 2020) and other published historical and contemporary novels.

== Biography ==
The Colombian author, with an early vocation as a writer, studied mechanical engineering at the University of America in his hometown, with the idea of having a trade and financial stability that would allow him his passion for literature. Soon after, his family moved to Barranquilla, where he began his literary career with his first novel, El laberinto blanco (The white labyrinth, 2014), which recreates the phenomenon of drug trafficking and prostitution. It was followed in 2015 by Scarlett... La esencia divina del deseo (Scarlett... The divine essence of desire), which deals with the erotic excesses.

In 2000, while working in a concrete company in Barranquilla, he emigrated to the United States, after a failed kidnapping by the guerrillas. He has spent most of his literary and professional career in the United States.

== Literary development ==
Having ventured into contemporary themes linked to current affairs, he threw himself fully into the historical novel, with the creation and publication of El gran genocidio. ¿Descubrimiento o exterminio? (The great genocide. Discovery or extermination? 2018). After the discovery of the sunken treasure of the San José galleon in Colombian waters, the author takes advantage of this circumstance to take a journey into the past, shifting between contemporary and historical times, and between fictional characters and others who existed historically. This is accomplished through the novel's main character, the lawyer Samuel Piracún, a descendant of the Muiscas, who decides to sue the Spanish crown and take the matter to the International Criminal Court. The novel, published by Planeta, has been linked to Colombia's Plan Lector and raises questions about the different versions that exist about the conquest of America.

The author, with ease in recreating the environments and the multiple details of the past, continued with other themes of the colonial era. Through the novel Piel de ébano (2020), he shows the times of slavery in Cartagena de Indias and the role of women. Through the mulatta Manuela, who finds her liberation through sewing, the stories of women are woven together to complete a picture that shows that misogyny, discrimination and feminicide have been part of humanity; social crimes that have been justified and that are recounted throughout the novel.

The 500-page novel took six months of research, eight months of writing and eight months of revision and corrections. The research covered the study of the eighteenth century Cartagena, and among the different historiographical materials, the 1777 Census. Also the documents and testimonies of the illustrious travelers Antonio de Ulloa and Jorge Juan y Santacilia in 1735; documents from the General Archive of the Indies in Seville, and the General Archive of the Nation in Bogota; in addition to the advice of several Colombian historians. As for the advice on slavery, the author recognizes the importance of the novel Roots, by the North American writer Alex Haley, to know the whole socio-economic framework of slavery between the XVI and XIX centuries.

Although the novel describes the 18th century Colombian Caribbean, the narration and dialogues flow in the present, with the idea of maintaining proximity to the reader. According to Grethel Delgado, the novel is written in an "enveloping and sensual manner, with delicate erotic scenes to reflect the carnal encounters through numerous plots that help color the colonial era with an almost palpable definition".

In Man in the Mirror (2021), he returns to the present time and the debacle of a couple after the Houston Tornado as they face death and devastation. With Transmigration (2015) and A Life for Steven (2019) the author exposes ethical and scientific debates.

Robayo develops his novels by constructing a story line based on real events, knowing the ending beforehand, and incorporating the twists and turns and new plots that emerge from his imagination.

The author has been present at various cultural events in Mexico, and has been invited to the Guadalajara Book Fair, the Bogotá International Book Fair, and fairs in the United States and Ecuador. He has also participated in literary and historical events at several universities: U. de Cartagena, U. Surcolombiana de Neiva, and Universidad Autónoma de Puebla, among others.

In 2021 he won the 2nd Prize for best historical fiction novel at the 2021 International Latino Book Awards in Los Angeles.

At the Bogotá International Book Fair (FILBO 2023), he presented the works recently published by Planeta Colombia: Aleluya, and A la caza del Galeón San José: el naufragio, a graphic historical novel aimed at young readers that is the first in a series.

Aleluya recounts the life of Paula de Eguiluz in Cartagena de Indias, who was tried three times by the Inquisition, accused of witchcraft. A la caza del Galeón San José, Naufragio, is about men who feel the call of the waters and who cannot live in peace until they embark and give their lives to the adventure.

In 2024, Robayo published El misterio de La Clarisa (The Mystery of La Clarisa), which deals with the vicissitudes surrounding the custody of the convent of Santa Clara la Real in Tunja, following the decision of the Poor Clares to put it up for sale. The jewel was created by Nicolás de Burgos in 1734 with gold, emeralds, and pearls. The author develops a historical novel based on the legends surrounding it and the intrigues caused by its sale in the 20th century.

With La niña, the author uses an intimate and direct narrative to address the issue of domestic violence, recounting a true story of abuse spanning several generations of a family.

== Publications ==
- El laberinto blanco (The white labyrinth) Editorial Oveja Negra, 2014.
- Transmigración, (Transmigration) Editorial Oveja Negra, 2015; Taller Editorial Roca, 2021
- Scarlett, Editorial Oveja Negra 2015; Taller Editorial Roca 2022
- El gran genocidio (The great genocide) Planeta, 2018; Editorial Sb 2022
- Una vida para Steven, Planeta 2019.
- Piel de ébano, Planeta 2020.
- El hombre en el espejo (The man in the mirror), Planeta 2021.
- Aleluya, Planeta 2022.
- A la caza del Galeón San José, Naufragio, Planeta, 2022.
- El misterio de La Clarisa, Planeta 2024.
- La niña, Periscopio 2025.
