= Colombian Institute of Anthropology and History =

Colombian scientific and technical government agency

- Instituto Colombiano de Antropología e Historia
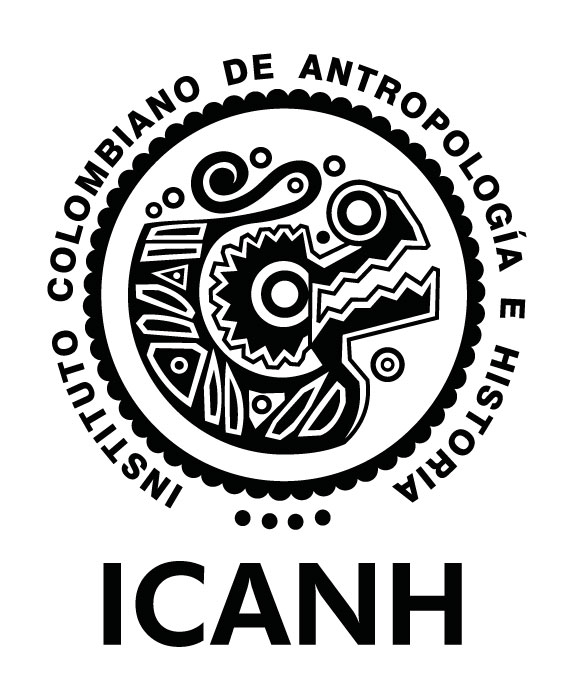

Agency overview
- Formed: 24 December 1999; 26 years ago
- Preceding agencies: National Archeological Service; National Ethnographic Institute; Colombian Institute of Hispanic Culture
- Headquarters: Calle 12 № 2-41 Bogotá, D.C., Colombia
- Annual budget: COP$8,379,225,798 (2011); COP$9,602,340,786 (2012); COP$10,426,541,605 (2013)
- Agency executive: Director
- Parent agency: Ministry of Culture
- Website: www.icanh.gov.co

The Colombian Institute of Anthropology and History (Spanish: Instituto Colombiano de Antropología e Historia), ICANH, is a scientific and technical government agency ascribed to the Ministry of Culture in charge of researching, producing and disseminating knowledge in the fields of anthropology, archeology and colonial history to protect the archaeological and ethnographic patrimony of Colombia.

== History ==
The National Archaeological Service was founded in 1938 in Colombia. In 1941, the National Ethnological Institute was founded by Paul Rivet. President Eduardo Santos Montejo invited Rivet to come from France to establish an academic teaching institute, which would formalize anthropological studies in the country. The institute was to be founded on scientific principals to investigate and analyze the diverse ethnic groups of Colombia. In 1952, the two organizations were merged, to form the Colombian Institute of Anthropology under the Ministry of Education. One year previously, the Colombian Institute of Hispanic Culture had been formed to preserve the Spanish culture of Colombia. In 1999, this organization was merged with the Colombian Institute of Anthropology to form the present entity.

== See also ==
- List of Muisca research institutes
